= WDDC =

Radio station in Portage, Wisconsin

- Portage, Wisconsin; United States
- Broadcast area: Portage, Wisconsin Dells
- Frequency: 100.1 MHz
- Branding: Thunder 100.1

Programming
- Format: Country

Ownership
- Owner: Magnum Broadcasting
- Sister stations: WBKY, WNNO-FM, WDLS, WAUN, WNFM, WBOO, WRDB, WBOG, WLXR, WTMB

History
- First air date: November 8, 1966
- Former call signs: WPDR-FM (1966–1977)

Technical information
- Licensing authority: FCC
- Facility ID: 35515
- Class: A
- ERP: 3,100 watts
- HAAT: 114 meters (374 ft)
- Transmitter coordinates: 43°31′42.00″N 89°26′1.00″W

Links
- Public license information: Public file; LMS
- Webcast: Listen live
- Website: thunder100fm.com

WDDC (100.1 FM, "Thunder 100.1") is a radio station broadcasting a country music format. Prior to country music, WDDC featured an adult contemporary format for many years as "FM 100, WDDC". Licensed to Portage, Wisconsin, United States, the station serves Portage as well as greater Wisconsin Dells and northern portion of the Madison region. The station is currently owned by Magnum Broadcasting.

== Magnum Broadcasting station purchase ==
On March 1, 2011, Magnum Broadcasting announced that they had taken responsibility for WDDC and WPDR, which were located in Portage, Wisconsin. Prior to this date, the stations were controlled by Zoe Communications Inc., based in Shell Lake, WI. The purchase price was reported as $750,000.
