= WBKY =

Radio station in Portage, Wisconsin

- Stoughton, Wisconsin; United States
- Broadcast area: Janesville, Wisconsin; Madison, Wisconsin
- Frequency: 95.9 MHz
- Branding: Bucky Country 95.9 & 99.5

Programming
- Format: Country
- Affiliations: AP Radio, Jones Radio Network

Ownership
- Owner: Magnum Communications, Inc.
- Sister stations: WNFM; WRDB; WNNO-FM; WDLS; WBOO; WDDC; WAUN

History
- First air date: 1999
- Former call signs: WVZO (1992–1992); WZST (1992–1994); WUSX (1994–1996)
- Call sign meaning: W BucKY Country

Technical information
- Licensing authority: FCC
- Facility ID: 39625
- Class: A
- ERP: 2,000 watts
- HAAT: 176 meters
- Transmitter coordinates: 42°48′02.00″N 89°03′16.00″W
- Repeater: (107.3-4) WSJY-HD4 (Fort Atkinson)

Links
- Public license information: Public file; LMS
- Webcast: Listen Live

WBKY (95.9 FM) is a radio station broadcasting a country music format. Licensed to Stoughton, Wisconsin, United States, the station serves the Janesville and Madison areas. The station is currently owned by Magnum Communications, Inc. and features programming from AP Radio and Jones Radio Network.

== History ==
The station was assigned the call sign WVZO on September 2, 1992. On October 12, 1992, the station changed its call sign to WZST, on July 1, 1994 to WUSX, and on March 29, 1996 to the current WBKY.

In April 2024, WBKY completed its move from Portage to Stoughton, with its new signal serving Madison and Janesville.
