= WLXR =

WLXR may refer to:

- WLXR (FM), a radio station (96.1 FM) licensed to serve Tomah, Wisconsin, United States
- WLCX (AM), a radio station (1490 AM) licensed to serve La Crosse, Wisconsin, which held the call sign WLXR from 1983 to 1988 and 2020 to 2023
- WEQL, a radio station (104.9 FM) licensed to serve La Crosse, Wisconsin, which held the call sign WLXR-FM from 1973 to 2020
