= WFAW =

WFAW may refer to:

- WFAW (AM) (940 AM), a Fort Atkinson, Wisconsin radio station
- WSJY (107.3 FM), a Fort Atkinson, Wisconsin radio station which held the WFAW call sign from 1959 to 1981
- WFAW (Miami) (833 AM), a former radio station which held the WFAW call sign from 1922 to 1923
