= WQCC =

Radio station in La Crosse, Wisconsin

- La Crosse, Wisconsin; United States
- Broadcast area: La Crosse, Wisconsin
- Frequency: 106.3 MHz
- Branding: Kicks 106.3

Programming
- Format: Country
- Affiliations: Premiere Networks; Westwood One

Ownership
- Owner: Magnum Media; (Magnum Communications, Inc.)
- Sister stations: WKBH-FM, WLXR, WBOG, WTMB

History
- First air date: February 10, 1993
- Former call signs: WLJO (1993–1994)
- Call sign meaning: "Coulee Country"

Technical information
- Licensing authority: FCC
- Facility ID: 43209
- Class: C3
- ERP: 18,000 watts
- HAAT: 118 m (387 ft)
- Transmitter coordinates: 43°51′2.00″N 91°12′8.00″W

Links
- Public license information: Public file; LMS
- Webcast: Listen live
- Website: kicks1063.com

WQCC (106.3 FM, “Kicks 106.3”) is a commercial radio station broadcasting a country music format. Licensed to La Crosse, Wisconsin, United States, the station serves the La Crosse area. The station is currently owned by Magnum Communications.

All the stations of the "La Crosse Radio Group" are housed at 1407 2nd Avenue North in Onalaska, Wisconsin.

== History ==
The station went on the air as WLJO on February 10, 1993. On January 31, 1994, the station changed its call sign to the current WQCC.
