= WRBJ =

WRBJ can refer to:

- WRBJ-TV, a television station (channel 34) licensed to Magee, Mississippi, United States
- WRBJ-FM, a radio station (97.7 FM) licensed to Brandon, Mississippi, United States
