= W43BR =

Television station in Baraboo, Wisconsin

- Baraboo, Wisconsin; United States
- Channels: Digital: 16 (UHF); Virtual: 43
- Branding: TV-43

Programming
- Affiliations: 43.1: YTA TV

Ownership
- Owner: Baraboo Broadcasting Corporation

History
- First air date: September 28, 1998
- Former channel numbers: Analog: 43 (UHF, until 2020)
- Call sign meaning: sequentially assigned

Technical information
- Licensing authority: FCC
- Facility ID: 703676
- ERP: 15 kW
- HAAT: 293.2 m (962 ft)
- Transmitter coordinates: 43°25′50″N 89°39′13″W

Links
- Public license information: Public file; LMS
- Website: W43BR

W43BR (channel 43) is a low-power television station licensed to Baraboo, Wisconsin, United States, serving the Wisconsin Dells area as an affiliate of YTA TV. Owned by Baraboo Broadcasting, it was formerly a sister to radio station WRPQ (740 AM and translator 99.7 FM) until the latter's sale to Civic Media. The two outlets continue to share studios on 8th Avenue in downtown Baraboo. W43BR's transmitter is situated on the Baraboo Range near Devil's Lake State Park, co-located with WOLX, W271DQ, W259BC, W290AL, NOAA Weather Radio station KHA-47 and several other telecommunication services.

The station began broadcasting on September 28, 1998. It called itself "WRPQ-TV" in connection with its sister radio station. The station aired local programming and filled its broadcast day with content from the American Independent Network and America One. In 2000, the station affiliated with Pax.

W43BR's signal was originally beamed to the north and west so as not to interfere with Mayville-licensed TBN station WWRS-TV (channel 52), which broadcast on digital channel 43. W43BR still broadcasts with a highly directional signal to protect Rockford, Illinois–based WTVO.

W43BR has limited Spectrum cable coverage in the Baraboo/Wisconsin Dells area, along with surrounding portions of Columbia, Sauk, Adams and Juneau counties, and western portions of Dane County on channel 10. W43BR is also carried on TDS Telecom in parts of the Madison market. It is not available on cable in the city of Madison.
