= WPDR =

WPDR may refer to:

- WPDR-LD, a television station (channel 35, virtual 8) licensed to serve Tomah, Wisconsin, United States
- WAUN (AM), a radio station in Portage, Wisconsin, which used the call sign WPDR from 1952 to 2021
- Washington State Parkinson Disease Registry
