= WRBU =

Television station in East St. Louis, Illinois

- East St. Louis, Illinois; St. Louis, Missouri; United States
- City: East St. Louis, Illinois
- Channels: Digital: 28 (UHF); Virtual: 46

Programming
- Affiliations: 46.1: Ion Television; for others, see § Subchannels

Ownership
- Owner: Ion Media; (Ion Media License Company, LLC)

History
- Founded: August 13, 1987
- First air date: September 11, 1989
- Former call signs: WHSL (1989–2003)
- Former channel numbers: Analog: 46 (UHF, 1989–2009); Digital: 47 (UHF, until 2020)
- Former affiliations: HSN (1989–2003); UPN (secondary 2002–2003, primary 2003–2006); MyNetworkTV (2006–2014); NBC (alternate, 2006–2014)
- Call sign meaning: Roberts Broadcasting (former owner); UHF (channel position) or UPN (former affiliation)

Technical information
- Licensing authority: FCC
- Facility ID: 57221
- ERP: 1,000 kW
- HAAT: 334 m (1,096 ft)
- Transmitter coordinates: 38°23′18″N 90°29′16″W

Links
- Public license information: Public file; LMS
- Website: iontelevision.com

WRBU (channel 46) is a television station licensed to East St. Louis, Illinois, United States, broadcasting the Ion Television network to the St. Louis, Missouri, area. Owned by the Ion Media subsidiary of the E. W. Scripps Company, the station broadcasts from a transmitter located near Missouri Route 21 and East Four Ridge Road in House Springs.

== History ==
=== Early history ===
The station first signed on the air on September 11, 1989, as WHSL, originally operating as a full simulcast of the Home Shopping Network (HSN). Unlike most full-time HSN affiliates of the period, it was not founded by the network's broadcasting arm, Silver King Communications; instead, it was originally owned by St. Louis-based Roberts Broadcasting, a family-owned firm owned by African American businessmen Steven, Mike and Mark Roberts. WHSL was the first full-power television station to sign on in the St. Louis market since KNLC (channel 24) debuted in September 1982.

What was a placid relationship between HSN and Roberts for the station's first seven years on air soured in 1996, when HSN sued the station for breach of contract; Roberts sought to air more infomercials and fewer hours of home shopping. The move came after HSN reduced the number of local commercial minutes per hour from 5 to 2 and after Roberts considered leasing the station's airtime to River City Broadcasting (owners of KDNL-TV) or Koplar Communications, which owned KPLR-TV. A judge found in favor of HSN in the dispute. With few exceptions, Roberts was thus locked into airing HSN's programs in an arrangement that did not expire until 2003.

=== From HSN to UPN ===
In June 2001, Roberts announced that it had signed an agreement to become an affiliate of UPN, a move that would give the network its first primary affiliate in St. Louis and end the market's status as the largest U.S. city by market size that did not have a full-time affiliate of the network. The deal would begin in 2003, when the HSN contract expired. Despite the fact that St. Louis was large enough to support exclusive affiliations with all six major broadcast networks that were in operation after January 1995, WHSL's commitment to HSN prevented UPN from having a stable exclusive affiliate in the market. When the network launched, it had no affiliate in St. Louis. It finally found one in KDNL-TV, by then an ABC affiliate, which aired its programming in late night time slots from August 1995 until January 1998. When KDNL-TV opted to focus on ABC programming, it was another 16 months until UPN reached an agreement with religious independent station KNLC—which ended after just a year and with KNLC refusing to clear three-fourths of UPN's shows as inconsistent with its programming philosophy. KPLR-TV took on a part-time affiliation with UPN—although delaying its prime time shows until after the station's 9 p.m. newscast—in September 2000.

In July 2002, KPLR decided to disaffiliate from UPN and exclusively align with The WB, a move which would have affected fans of two of the network's most popular series of the period, Buffy the Vampire Slayer and Star Trek: Enterprise, forcing them to watch both shows either through UPN-affiliated superstations offered by Dish Network or by way of tape trading. Roberts management sought to remedy this by obtaining permission from HSN to allow WHSL to preempt two hours a week of programming during prime time to carry both shows starting in September 2002.

On January 17, 2003, the station changed its call sign to WRBU (a partial reference to its corporate parent). The remainder of the UPN programming lineup moved to channel 46 three months later on April 1. On that date, WRBU replaced the HSN programming with a lineup of syndicated programs to fill out the schedule, consisting of a mix of sitcoms, drama series and first-run syndicated talk, court and reality shows.

In February 2003, Roberts Broadcasting sold a 50% interest in WRBU to the TeleFutura subsidiary of Univision Communications, under the joint venture licensee St. Louis/Denver LLC; under the terms of the deal, Roberts continued to operate the station through a time brokerage agreement and was given right of first refusal on appointees for the directors of WRBU's licensee. Through its involvement in the venture, Roberts in turn transferred operational responsibilities for its station in Denver, KTVJ (now KTFD-TV), to Univision, which converted that station into a TeleFutura affiliate. Roberts Broadcasting would eventually acquire other television stations in the Midwestern and Southeastern U.S., signing on two UPN-affiliated stations (WZRB in Columbia, South Carolina, in 2005 and WRBJ-TV in Jackson, Mississippi, in 2006) and acquiring WB affiliate WAZE-TV in Evansville, Indiana, from South Central Communications in 2006.

=== As a MyNetworkTV affiliate ===
On January 24, 2006, the respective parent companies of UPN and The WB, CBS Corporation and the Warner Bros. Entertainment division of Time Warner, announced that they would dissolve the two networks to create The CW Television Network, a joint venture between the two media companies that initially featured programs from its two predecessor networks as well as new series specifically produced for The CW. On that date, The CW also signed a ten-year affiliation agreement with Tribune Broadcasting, under which sixteen of the group's eighteen WB-affiliated stations would serve as the network's charter stations. One of the stations included in the agreement was KPLR-TV, which was announced as the network's St. Louis affiliate over WRBU; although, since the network chose its affiliates based on which television station among The WB and UPN's respective affiliate bodies was the highest-rated in each market, it is likely that KPLR would have been chosen over WRBU in any event, as channel 11 had been the higher-rated of the two stations even before it became a network affiliate upon joining The WB in January 1995 and had been one of The WB's strongest affiliates for the near entirety of that network's eleven-year existence.

Subsequently, on February 22, 2006, News Corporation announced the launch of MyNetworkTV, a network operated by Fox Television Stations and its syndication division Twentieth Television that was created to primarily to provide network programming to UPN and WB stations with which The CW decided against affiliating based on their local viewership standing in comparison to the outlet that the network ultimately chose, allowing these stations another option besides converting to independent stations. On March 9, in a joint announcement by the network and Roberts Broadcasting, WRBU was confirmed as the charter MyNetworkTV affiliate for St. Louis.

Channel 46 became a MyNetworkTV affiliate when that network launched on September 5, and concurrently rebranded as "My 46"; like other UPN-affiliated stations that were committed to join MyNetworkTV, WRBU ceased carrying UPN's prime time programming, resulting in the network's final two weeks of programming—which largely consisted of repeats of network shows aired during the 2005–06 television season—not being carried in St. Louis. KPLR, meanwhile, remained a WB affiliate until September 17, and officially affiliated with The CW when that network debuted the following day on September 18. As a MyNetworkTV affiliate, the station began serving as a backup NBC affiliate during occasions when KSDK (channel 5) was forced to preempt programs from that network due to commitments to air St. Louis Cardinals baseball games, the Jerry Lewis MDA Labor Day Telethon or locally produced specials, or because of preemptions necessitated to provide breaking news or severe weather coverage. In March 2010, Roberts Broadcasting and Univision Communications filed to formally dissolve the St. Louis/Denver LLC venture, under which Roberts acquired full ownership of WRBU in exchange for selling its interest in KTFD to Univision as compensation for buying out the latter's share in WRBU.

=== Bankruptcy and sale ===
By 2010, the Roberts brothers had begun facing serious financial trouble with their various businesses. The Roberts' broadcasting unit, in particular, had become the subject of lawsuits by Warner Bros. Television, 20th Television and CBS Television Distribution over its failure to make fee payments for syndicated programs that it acquired for its CW- and MyNetworkTV-affiliated stations (Warner Bros. and CBS would win their court disputes against Roberts, which also later reached a settlement with 20th Television); the company also was unable to fund the construction of Evansville CW affiliate WAZE-TV's digital transmitter facilities, an issue that led the Federal Communications Commission (FCC) to cancel that station's full-power license in March 2011 (WAZE continued to operate through its three analog-only low-power translators until their shutdown in January 2013). This culminated in Roberts Broadcasting filing for Chapter 11 bankruptcy protection on October 7, 2011. The group cited the cause of its financial downturn on the loss of the UPN affiliations on WRBU, WZRB and WRBJ-TV, on the basis that much of UPN's programming slate at the time of its shutdown consisted of shows aimed at African Americans and other minority audiences that Roberts felt were compatible with the core viewership of the stations.

On February 20, 2012, Roberts announced that the company was exploring the sale of one or all four of its television stations in order to raise sufficient funding to pay off its creditors; the company would eventually sell WRBJ to the Trinity Broadcasting Network in October 2012 and WZRB to Tri-State Christian Television subsidiary Radiant Light Ministries on December 2, 2013, leaving WRBU as the last station that Roberts had yet to cut a divestiture deal.

On December 4, 2013, Roberts filed to sell WRBU to Tri-State Christian Television directly for $5.5 million; however, on December 11, a U.S. Bankruptcy Court hearing gave initial approval for a plan by Roberts' creditors to instead transfer WRBU and its sister stations, WZRB and former WAZE-TV translator WAZE-LP, to a trust overseen by Gary Chapman with Ion Media Networks—a creditor in Roberts' bankruptcy proceedings—as its beneficiary. The attorney representing Roberts subsequently stated that Ion Media would purchase the three stations outright. The FCC approved the deal on February 2, 2014.

=== As an Ion affiliate-turned-O&O ===
WRBU became an Ion Television affiliate on February 10, 2014, marking the network's resumption of an over-the-air presence in the St. Louis market. Mount Vernon, Illinois–based WPXS (channel 13, now a Daystar owned-and-operated station) operated as an affiliate of Ion predecessors Pax TV and i: Independent Television during two separate tenures from 1998 to 2004 and 2005 to 2008 (Paxson Communications—which evolved into Ion Media following its 2005 reorganization—owned WPXS during the first tenure; Equity Media Holdings owned the station during its tenure as an i/Ion affiliate following a one-year affiliation deferral to Daystar preceding Paxson's sale of WPXS). The network had also been available in St. Louis proper through low-power repeater KUMO-LP (channel 51), which covered portions of the St. Louis metropolitan area that had inadequate reception of the WPXS signal but had sparse cable coverage in most of the market. After WPXS dropped Ion to become a Retro Television Network affiliate in 2008, most St. Louis viewers could only receive Ion programming via cable and satellite from the network's national feed.

The sale to the Ion trust resulted in the company voiding WRBU's agreements with syndication distributors and with Fox Entertainment Group for the MyNetworkTV affiliation, with the network switch causing St. Louis to become the largest American television market at that time without a MyNetworkTV affiliate. The syndication service would eventually return to the market when CBS affiliate KMOV (channel 4) relaunched its DT3 subchannel on November 17, 2014, acquiring both the MyNetworkTV affiliation and many syndicated shows formerly carried by WRBU that had lost local distribution in St. Louis because of the switch (through St. Louis' status as a top-25 market, KMOV-DT3 became the largest subchannel-only MyNetworkTV affiliate).

On January 29, 2015, Cedar Creek Broadcasting (a company controlled by Brian Brady, who also owns several other broadcasting companies operating as de facto arms of his flagship group, Northwest Broadcasting) agreed to purchase WRBU and WZRB from the trust for $6 million; Ion would have provided services to the stations, which would remain Ion affiliates. On May 9, 2017, the Broadcast Trust informed the FCC that the sale to Cedar Creek Broadcasting had been terminated. One month after the Cedar Creek purchase's termination (and with the FCC restoring the UHF discount), on June 20, 2017, Ion Media announced that it would purchase WRBU from the Chapman-owned/Ion-managed trust, in a two-station deal with Columbia sister station WZRB, for an undisclosed amount. The sale was completed on October 19, 2017.

== Technical information ==
=== Subchannels ===
The station's signal is multiplexed:

Subchannels of WRBU
| Subchannel | Res. | Short name | Programming |
|---|---|---|---|
| 46.1 | 720p | ION | Ion Television |
| 46.2 | 720p | Bounce | Bounce TV |
| 46.3 | 480i | Laff | Laff |
| 46.4 | 480i | IONPlus | Ion Plus |
| 46.5 | 480i | BUSTED | Busted |
| 46.6 | 480i | GameSho | Game Show Central |
| 46.7 | 480i | QVC | QVC |
| 46.8 | 480i | HSN | HSN |

Until May 2014, WRBU transmitted its primary digital channel in 480i standard definition, making it one of the few network-affiliated stations in the United States that did not transmit an HD feed through its digital signal (internal promotions for the station's website and Facebook page that were produced during its MyNetworkTV affiliation were downconverted from 16:9 to a letterboxed 4:3 format when aired on the station). On March 10, 2014, exactly one month after the Chapman/Ion trust took ownership of the station, WRBU began carrying all five subchannel services carried by Ion Media on its Ion Television owned-and-operated stations; it also resulted in WRBU reuniting with HSN's over-the-air service, which Ion has carried on the DT5 feed of its stations since November 2013. On May 1, 2014, WRBU began transmitting its main feed in high definition in the network's standard 720p format.

=== Analog-to-digital conversion ===
WRBU shut down its analog signal, over UHF channel 46, on January 21, 2009. The station's digital signal continued to broadcasts on its pre-transition UHF channel 47, using virtual channel 46.
