= WAZE-TV =

Television station in Madisonville, Kentucky (1983–2011)

- Madisonville, Kentucky; Evansville, Indiana; United States
- City: Madisonville, Kentucky
- Channels: Digital: 20 (UHF); Virtual: 19

Programming
- Affiliations: WAZE-TV/WIKY-LP/WJPS-LP: Independent (1983–1997); The WB (1997–2006); UPN (secondary, 1997–2003); The CW (2006–2013); WAZE-LP/WEOA-LP: Independent (1991–1995); UPN (primary 1995–1997, secondary 1997–2003); The WB (secondary 1995–1997, primary 1997–2006); The CW (2006–2013); Dark (2013–2014); Ion Television (2014–2017)

Ownership
- Owner: WAZE-TV/WEOA-LP/WJPS-LP/WIKY-LP: Roberts Broadcasting; WAZE-LP: Ion Media Networks; (WAZE-LP: Ion Media License Company, LLC)

History
- Founded: WAZE-TV: June 7, 1982; WJPS-LP: July 23, 1985; WIKY-LP: October 7, 1985; WEOA-LP: February 28, 1989; WAZE-LP: July 28, 1989
- First air date: WAZE-TV: October 15, 1983; WIKY-LP: February 27, 1987; WJPS-LP: June 15, 1987; WAZE-LP: February 4, 1991; WEOA-LP: August 18, 1995
- Last air date: WEOA-LP: August 14, 2007; WAZE-TV: March 24, 2011; WIKY-LP/WJPS-LP: January 3, 2013; WAZE-LP: December 15, 2017
- Former call signs: WAZE-TV: WLCN (1983–1997), WWAZ-TV (1997–2000); WIKY-LP: W05BC (1987–1994); WJPS-LP: W04BV (1987–1994); WAZE-LP: W52AZ (1991–1997); WWAZ-LP (1997–2000); WEOA-LP: W67CB (1995–1996)
- Former channel numbers: Analog: WAZE-TV: 19 (UHF, 1983–2009); WIKY-LP: 5 (VHF, 1987–2013); WJPS-LP: 4 (VHF, 1987–2013); WAZE-LP: 52 (UHF, 1991–1998), 17 (UHF, 1998–2017); WEOA-LP: 67 (UHF, 1995–1998), 50 (UHF, 1998–2007); Digital: WAZE-TV: 20 (UHF, STA until 2013); Virtual: WAZE-TV: 19 (until 2013)

Technical information
- Facility ID: 74592
- ERP: 1.1 kW
- HAAT: 216 m (709 ft)
- Transmitter coordinates: 37°24′56.6″N 87°31′29″W
- Translator(s): WAZE-LP 17 (UHF) Evansville, IN; WEOA-LP 50 (UHF) Evansville, IN; WIKY-LP 5 (VHF) Evansville, IN; WJPS-LP 4 (VHF) Evansville, IN

WAZE-TV (channel 19) was a television station licensed to Madisonville, Kentucky, United States. It served the Evansville, Indiana, television market from 1983 to 2013, and was most recently affiliated with The CW. The station's transmitter was located in Hanson, Kentucky. On March 24, 2011, the Federal Communications Commission (FCC) canceled WAZE's license for failure to construct its full-power digital facility.

The station continued to broadcast via low-power translators WAZE-LP (channel 17), WJPS-LP (channel 4) and WIKY-LP (channel 5), all licensed to Evansville, until January 2013, when all three were shut down. They served as in-town relays of the main signal. WAZE-TV's transmitter was located farther south than the other major Evansville stations because of FCC regulations requiring a station's transmitter to be no more than 15 miles (24 km) from the city of license—in this case, Madisonville, which is 50 miles (80 km) south of Evansville. As a result, despite its 2.7 million watt ERP, the channel 19 signal provided only grade B ("rimshot") coverage of Evansville itself, and was practically unviewable north and east of the city. The station relied on carriage by cable and satellite providers to reach most of its viewing area. However, many cable systems in the market (particularly on the Indiana and Illinois sides) did not carry it.

== History ==
=== Original allocation of channel 19 ===
The Channel 19 frequency was originally allocated to Owensboro, where then-owner of WVJS radio, Owensboro on the Air (presided by the Steele family), originally held a construction permit to build WVJS-TV in the early 1970s. Those plans were scrapped when the Steele family, who also owned the area's cable television system, elected to operated a local access channel on cable channel 2.

=== As a religious independent station ===
After the frequency was reallocated to Madisonville in the few years prior, channel 19 signed on the air with its inaugural broadcast on October 15, 1983, as WLCN, the first independent television station to sign on in the northwestern Kentucky coalfields region. It originally ran mostly Christian programming along with segments of Home Shopping Spree. After WEVV-TV (channel 44), which signed on a month later, became a charter Fox affiliate in 1987, WLCN was the only over-the-air source of non-network programming in the Illinois–Indiana–Kentucky tri-state area for 11 years. However, cable systems piped in either WTTV in Indianapolis or KPLR-TV in St. Louis, depending on the location.

At the time of its inception, the station was owned by locally based non-profit Life Anew Ministries, who began their television venture by airing locally produced Christian programming on the Madisonville area's public access station on cable. Before WLCN came on the air, the ministry leased a channel from the local cable company to air its Christian programming. Once the station went on the air, the religious independent format was available free of charge for all viewers. The studios were originally located at the Life Anew Ministries headquarters alongside its church and its Christian academy. However, the operation of the station did not go without financial difficulty as the station relied mostly on church resources and the station's supporters as it was a nonprofit venture.

On May 20, 1986, the station attempted to erect a new transmission tower at a site near Earlington in order to expand signal reach, but it collapsed during construction due to unknown causes. Even with a technical upgrade with a finally-completed new tower and increase in signal power to 1.2 million watts in 1992, the station still had difficulty paying its debts, thus leading the station to extend its telethons for several nights.

Life Anew defaulted on its debts in 1991. However, an unknown "Good Samaritan" who heard of the station's financial troubles bought the church building after the 1992 telethons, thus bringing the ministry the financial help needed to keep the station on the air. Nightly church services, along with family programming and fare from the Inspirational Network, became part of the station's broadcast schedule by 1993.

=== Affiliation with The WB ===
South Central Communications, based in Evansville, acquired the station on September 18, 1997, for $5 million to convert it into a commercial general entertainment outlet. A few weeks later on November 1 of that year, it became affiliated with The WB Television Network, and changed its call letters to WWAZ-TV. South Central also converted three Evansville-licensed, low-powered stations into a network of repeaters to better cover the Evansville market. From the time the station affiliated with The WB until 2003, the station was also affiliated with UPN to air that network's programming following The WB's prime time schedule. The UPN affiliation was previously held by W52AZ (channel 52), which was one of the low-power stations that became part of WWAZ's translator network; that station also carried WB programming as a secondary affiliation. In 1999, it began branding as WAZE-TV, and changed its call letters to match the following year. The original location of the studio at that time was in the South Central Communications building. Later, they occupied a facility just down a hill in a remodeled nursery/plant store that was later expanded to include a studio.

=== Affiliation with The CW ===
On January 24, 2006, the Warner Bros. unit of Time Warner and CBS Corporation announced that the two companies would shut down The WB and UPN and combine the networks' respective programming to create a new "fifth" network called The CW. WAZE-TV was announced to become a charter CW affiliate when the network launched on September 18.

South Central sold WAZE to Roberts Broadcasting in 2006. In mid-2007, Roberts moved the station's master control to company flagship WRBU in St. Louis, leaving only a sales staff in Evansville. In January 2009, the Evansville office was closed altogether.

=== Spurned sale and legal issues with syndicated programming ===
According to documents filed by the Federal Communications Commission (FCC) in March 2009, Roberts Broadcasting had agreed to sell WAZE and the station's three Evansville translators to BGT Communications, LLC for $50,000—a mere fraction of what it paid to buy the station three years earlier. However, no approval has been given. The station's most recent biennial FCC ownership report, in 2010, listed only Roberts Broadcasting as the owner with no mention of the BGT transaction.

Additionally, CBS Television Distribution, 20th Television and Warner Bros. Television sued Roberts Broadcasting on three separate occasions for failure to pay for programming aired on WAZE and its sister stations—WRBU in St. Louis, WZRB in Columbia, South Carolina, and WRBJ in Jackson, Mississippi. The company reached an agreement with 20th Television in the summer of 2010; however, in March 2011, CBS won its lawsuit against Roberts and was awarded a $1 million judgment. CBS later filed an injunction against Roberts seeking payment. The result was a deeply wounded syndicated programming schedule after those distributors pulled their programming from the Roberts stations, leaving WAZE to air less attractive series that were sold under much less expensive barter arrangements such as the long-canceled Judge Hatchett and Cash Cab. Warner Bros. won its case as well in October 2011; on October 7, Roberts Broadcasting filed for Chapter 11 bankruptcy.

=== DTV transition issues and closure ===
As part of the digital TV transition, on June 12, 2009, WAZE turned off its full-power analog signal on channel 19. The station's digital signal on channel 20 operated under special temporary authority (STA) at only 1,110 watts (equivalent to a low-power analog station). The signal was so weak that it was barely viewable more than 15 miles (24 km) from the transmitter near Hanson. As a result, it did not even reach Evansville itself, and was barely watchable in the market's second-largest city, Owensboro. In March 2010, Evansville Courier & Press media columnist and Owensboro resident Jacob Newkirk reported that the station's digital signal had deteriorated to the point of unacceptability; the video often froze, skipped and shook. The picture from the translators was only marginally better; it was rather snowy.

The station had been issued a construction permit on at least two occasions to increase its power to a full million watts, which is equivalent to five million watts in analog. However, the station never began construction on its full-power digital facility due to a number of issues, including difficulty acquiring land. When the station failed to build out its full-power digital facility by an FCC-imposed deadline, the FCC revoked the license on March 24, 2011. On July 15, 2011, Newkirk reported that WAZE's digital signal was still on the air (or at the very least had resumed operations at some point following the FCC's cancellation of its license) without any official approval from the FCC; according to FCC rules, unauthorized broadcasting of a television station can result in a minimum fine of $10,000. However, by spring 2012, the station's digital signal had gone off the air for good.

Despite the loss of its full-power signal, WAZE remained on several area cable systems, as well as the Evansville DirecTV and Dish Network feeds, for over a year. Cable and satellite companies were not legally obligated to carry low-power stations. However, on January 3, 2013, the station's analog repeaters went off the air with no advance warning, leaving the Tri-State without a CW affiliate. Roberts had filed for bankruptcy protection in 2012, but did not file to renew the repeaters' licenses at the time the Evansville stations filed for renewal, meaning their licenses would have expired on August 1, 2013. In a filing with the FCC, Roberts filed a temporary request to halt operations due to the bankruptcy proceedings. However, Newkirk reported that the receiving equipment had been removed from the transmitter site, making it very unlikely that WAZE would return to the air in the foreseeable future. In any event, a prospective buyer would not only have to be approved by the bankruptcy court, but such approval would have had to have been granted before April 1 in order to give the new owner time to file for a license renewal. The repeaters would have been forced off the air in any event if they had not been converted to digital by 2015; as of late 2012, no conversion applications had been filed with the FCC.

On January 28, 2013, The CW announced WTVW as its new Evansville affiliate. In the interim, NewWave Communications imported another Roberts-owned CW affiliate, Columbia's WZRB, on its systems in southeastern Illinois and southwestern Indiana (other NewWave systems relied on existing carriage of WTTV for CW programming), while DirecTV imported WDCW in Washington, D.C. Other cable and satellite companies—including Insight Communications, the largest cable provider in the region—lost The CW altogether until WTVW officially joined the network on January 31.

=== Sale to Ion Media Networks ===
On December 11, 2013, the United States bankruptcy court gave initial approval for a plan by Roberts' creditors to transfer WAZE-LP/WJPS-LP/WIKY-LP, along with WRBU and WZRB, to a trust with Ion Media Networks (a creditor in Roberts' chapter 11 bankruptcy proceedings) as its beneficiary. Roberts' attorney subsequently stated that Ion would purchase the stations and return the WAZE stations to the air. Roberts had earlier proposed an alternate plan that would have transferred only the WAZE stations to the trust, with WRBU and WZRB being sold to Tri-State Christian Television. The FCC approved the deal on February 2, 2014, and WAZE-LP became an Ion Television owned-and-operated station, while WZRB and WRBU became Ion affiliates.

By April 2015, WJPS-LP and WIKY-LP's licenses have since been deleted. WAZE-LP continued to operate as an Ion O&O station. WAZE-LP broadcast in analog only; there were no plans to convert the station to digital. Because of this and Ion's inability to trigger must-carry on local providers due to said low-power status, Ion eventually decided to pursue other methods for full distribution across the Evansville market. The first was a sub-lease of the fourth digital subchannel of WTVW (channel 7), from station owner Mission Broadcasting and operations partner Nexstar Media Group. The second was the carriage of Ion's national feed on Spectrum channels 37 and 270 in Evansville, along with the major satellite providers (Wide Open West did not carry the network at all on its local systems). The license for WAZE-LP was canceled and its call sign deleted, at Ion Media's request, on December 15, 2017.

== Programming ==
During the early 1990s, WWAZ, branded as "WAZ TV 52", broadcast local Evansville high school varsity sports and NCAA games such as basketball, baseball, football, and soccer live and on delay. Darrin Smith (play-by-play), Doug Emig and Warren Distler were the local sports broadcasters for all games. Darrin Smith, who was also co-host of SportsTalk Live, called over 1,000 televised games for "WAZ TV 52" and WLCN/WWAZ/WAZE-TV from 1990 to 2001.

WAZE simulcast KSDK's coverage of the St. Louis Cardinals; this ended after the 2010 season, as Cardinals games not telecast nationally were moved exclusively to Fox Sports Midwest.

=== Newscasts ===
At one point, WEHT produced a 9 p.m. newscast for WAZE.

== Sister, repeater, and translator stations ==
=== WEOA-LP ===
WEOA-LP signed on the air on August 18, 1995, as W67CB; this callsign was held until 1996, when it switched to UHF channel 50. It was a translator of W52AZ until that station became a WAZE-TV translator, which WEOA-LP served as such until it was shut down on August 14, 2007.

=== WIKY-LP ===
WIKY-LP signed on the air as W05BC on February 28, 1987. Before becoming a WAZE translator in 1997, the station was broadcasting as an independent station.

=== WJPS-LP ===
WJPS-LP (channel 4) in Evansville was a low-powered (100-watt) translator of WAZE-LP, extending that station's signal into parts of Evansville that could not receive either the WAZE-LP signal or its parent station, WAZE-TV, before the latter's analog signal shutdown on June 12, 2009. This translator signed on the air on June 15, 1987, as W04BV. WJPS-LP was broadcast from the same tower as sister-station WIKY-LP. On January 3, 2013, all of WAZE-TV's translators, including WJPS-LP, were shut down.

As of April 2015, the FCC deleted WJPS-LP's license.
