= Pacific Northwest Udall Center =

The Pacific Udall Center (formerly PANUC) was established in 2009 as a new Morris K. Udall Center of Excellence for Parkinson's Disease Research. It is one of nine Udall Centers across the U.S. that honor former Utah Congressman Morris Udall with a "multidisciplinary research approach to elucidate the fundamental causes of PD [Parkinson's Disease] as well as to improve the diagnosis and treatment of patients with Parkinson's and related neurodegenerative disorders." The Pacific Udall Center is a collaboration among Stanford University, the University of Washington, the VA Puget Sound Health Care System, Oregon Health & Science University, and the Portland VA Medical Center. It is funded by a grant from the National Institute of Neurological Disorders and Stroke.

== Mission ==
The mission of the Pacific Udall Center is to better understand the cognitive impairment observed in PD. While PD is typically known for its motor symptoms (tremor, slowness of movement), it is increasingly recognized that cognitive impairment, including dementia, is also a common feature of PD. This “non-motor” aspect of PD is associated with reduced quality of life, more stress to caregivers than typical motor symptoms, and shortened lifespan. While there are effective treatments for the motor symptoms of PD, unfortunately, there are few treatment options for cognitive impairment, in large part due to a limited understanding of its causes in patients with PD. The Center will address this limitation through studies involving patient volunteers and through the development of models to better understand what brain changes lead to cognitive impairment in PD. Better understanding could lead to new treatments for this significant problem for patients with PD. In addition to generating new discoveries, the Pacific Udall Center will develop novel resources for other clinical, translational, and basic science researchers studying cognitive impairment in PD.

== Participation ==
The Pacific Udall Center will provide education and clinical care to patients with PD in the Pacific Northwest, as well as offer them new opportunities to participate in clinical research studying cognitive impairment. Interested patients will be recruited from existing area resources such as the Parkinson's Genetic Research (PaGeR) Group, the Washington State Parkinson Disease Registry (WDPR), the Northwest Parkinson's Disease Research, Education & Clinical Center (PADRECC), the Parkinson Center of Oregon, and the OHSU and UW Alzheimer's Disease Centers.
