= WRLM =

WRLM may refer to:

- WRLM (TV), a television station (channel 47) licensed to Canton, Ohio, United States
- WMMA (AM), a radio station (1480 AM) licensed to Irondale, Alabama, United States, which used the call sign WRLM from November 2006 to June 2008
- WKCH, a radio station (106.5 FM) licensed to Whitewater, Wisconsin, United States, which used the call sign WRLM from May to September 1993
- WSNE-FM, a radio station (93.3 FM) licensed to Taunton, Massachusetts, United States, which used the call signs WRLM and WRLM-FM from 1966 until 1980
