= WRJH =

WRJH may refer to:

- WRJH-LP, a low-power radio station (105.3 FM) licensed to serve Greeneville, Tennessee, United States
- WRBJ-FM, a radio station (97.7 FM) licensed to serve Brandon, Mississippi, United States, which held the call sign WRJH until 2007
