= KQEG =

KQEG may refer to:

- KQEG-CD, a Digital Class A television station (channel 23.1) licensed to serve La Crescent, Minnesota, United States
- WKBH-FM, a radio station (102.7 FM) licensed to serve La Crescent, Minnesota, which held the call sign KQEG from 1989 to 2020
