= WMYW =

WMYW may refer to:

- WMYW-LP, a low-power radio station (102.7 FM) licensed to serve Paulding, Ohio, United States
- W47CK, a defunct low-power television station (channel 47) licensed to serve Shallotte, North Carolina, United States, which branded itself as WMYW-TV
