= WNFM (FM) =

- Reedsburg, Wisconsin; United States
- Broadcast area: Wisconsin Dells, Wisconsin
- Frequency: 104.9 MHz
- Branding: Country 104.9

Programming
- Format: Country
- Affiliations: Performance Racing Network

Ownership
- Owner: Magnum Communications, Inc.
- Sister stations: WBOO, WRDB, WNNO-FM, WDLS, WBKY, WDDC, WAUN

History
- First air date: 1967
- Former call signs: WRDB-FM (1979–1984)

Technical information
- Licensing authority: FCC
- Facility ID: 59234
- Class: A
- ERP: 3,200 watts
- HAAT: 137 meters
- Transmitter coordinates: 43°35′32.00″N 90°0′42.00″W

Links
- Public license information: Public file; LMS
- Webcast: Listen Live
- Website: www.wnfmcountry.com

WNFM (104.9 FM) is a radio station broadcasting a country music format. Licensed to Reedsburg, Wisconsin, United States. The station is currently owned by Magnum Communications, Inc.

== History ==
The station went on air as WRDB-FM on November 30, 1967. On June 4, 1984 the station changed its call sign to the current WNFM.
