= WKBH-FM =

Radio station in La Crescent, Minnesota

- Onalaska, Wisconsin; United States
- Broadcast area: La Crosse, Wisconsin
- Frequency: 102.7 MHz (HD Radio)
- Branding: 102.7 WKBH

Programming
- Language: English
- Format: Classic rock; Classic hits
- Subchannels: HD2: WLXR simulcast (Adult contemporary); HD3: Alt 107.1 (Alternative rock); HD4: WTMB simulcast (Classic rock)

Ownership
- Owner: Dave Magnum; (Magnum Communications, Inc.)
- Sister stations: WBOG, WLXR, WQCC, WTMB

History
- First air date: April 5, 1989; 36 years ago (as KQEG)
- Former call signs: KQEG (1989–2020)

Technical information
- Licensing authority: FCC
- Facility ID: 72206
- Class: C3
- ERP: 4,000 watts
- HAAT: 214 m (702 ft)
- Transmitter coordinates: 43°43′17.00″N 91°17′24.00″W
- Translators: HD2: 97.9 K250AZ (La Crosse); HD3: 107.1 W296EH (La Crosse); HD4: 92.7 W223DN (La Crosse)

Links
- Public license information: Public file; LMS
- Webcast: Listen Live; Listen Live (HD3)
- Website: 1027wkbh.com; lacrossealt.com (HD3)

WKBH-FM (102.7 MHz, "102.7 WKBH") is a radio station broadcasting a classic rock and classic hits hybrid format. Licensed to Onalaska, Wisconsin, United States, the station serves the La Crosse area. The station is owned by Magnum Communications, Inc. as of July 31, 2020.

On July 1, 2019, the then-KQEG’s format changed from oldies to soft oldies, branded as "102.7 MeTV FM". WKBH-FM serves as the flagship station for a network dozens of stations and translators.

On August 1, 2020, KQEG’s format changed from soft oldies to classic rock, which moved from WKBH-FM 100.1 (which switched to EMF's K-Love contemporary Christian format). The station began identifying itself as WKBH-FM on August 1, 2020, although the call sign was not officially changed by the Federal Communications Commission until August 11.
