= WLXR (FM) =

- Tomah, Wisconsin; United States
- Broadcast area: La Crosse, Wisconsin
- Frequency: 96.1 MHz
- Branding: Mix 96.1 & 97.9

Programming
- Language: English
- Format: Adult contemporary
- Affiliations: AP Radio; Compass Media Networks; Premiere Networks

Ownership
- Owner: Magnum Broadcasting, Inc
- Sister stations: WTMB, WBOG, WKBH-FM, WQCC

History
- First air date: March 11, 1992 (as WTRL-FM)
- Former call signs: WTRL-FM (1990–1992); WBOG (1992–1997); WUSK (1997–2000); WXYM (2000–2023); WLXR-FM (2023)

Technical information
- Licensing authority: FCC
- Facility ID: 39627
- Class: C2
- ERP: 44,000 watts
- HAAT: 160 m (525 ft)
- Transmitter coordinates: 44°1′32.00″N 90°48′58.00″W

Links
- Public license information: Public file; LMS
- Webcast: Listen Live
- Website: wlxrradio.com

WLXR (96.1 FM, "Mix 96.1 & 97.9") is a radio station broadcasting an adult contemporary music radio format. Licensed to Tomah, Wisconsin, United States, the station serves the greater La Crosse area. The station is owned by Magnum Broadcasting and features programming from AP Radio, Compass Media Networks and Premiere Networks. The station no longer broadcasts in HD radio.

== History ==
The station was assigned call sign WTRL-FM on August 8, 1990. On February 7, 1992, the station changed its call sign to WBOG, again on February 3, 1997, to WUSK, and on October 20, 2000, to WXYM. From 2019 to 2020, the station re-broadcast on 107.1 from WKBH-FM HD3 until it became "Alt 107.1." On September 7, 2021, WXYM added Elvis Duran for mornings.

On May 14, 2023, Magnum Communications changed the call sign from WXYM to WLXR-FM, which was the former call sign for WEQL. On May 29, the call sign changed again, to WLXR.

On May 19, 2025, WLXR shifted its format to adult contemporary, branded as "Mix 96.1 & 97.9", simulcasting on translator W250AZ 97.9 FM La Crosse.
