= WDLS =

Radio station in Wisconsin Dells, Wisconsin

Coordinates: 43°38′23″N 89°43′14″W

Simulcasting WBOO Reedsburg
- Wisconsin Dells, Wisconsin; United States
- Broadcast area: Baraboo-Dells area
- Frequency: 900 kHz
- Branding: B102.9 & 98.5

Programming
- Format: Adult contemporary
- Affiliations: Packers Radio Network

Ownership
- Owner: Magnum Communications
- Sister stations: WNNO-FM, WNFM, WRDB, WBOO, WBKY, WDDC, WAUN

History
- First air date: 1969
- Former call signs: WWDA (1969–1973); WNNO (1973–1999); WDLS (1999–2001); WIBU (2001–2004)
- Call sign meaning: Wisconsin DeLlS

Technical information
- Licensing authority: FCC
- Facility ID: 2807
- Class: D
- Power: 1,000 watts day 220 watts night
- Translator: 98.5 W253DH (Baraboo)

Links
- Public license information: Public file; LMS
- Webcast: Listen Live
- Website: wbooradio.com

WDLS (900 AM) is an adult contemporary radio station in the resort community of Wisconsin Dells, Wisconsin simulcasting sister station WBOO 102.9 FM Reedsburg. WDLS is also relayed on an FM translator broadcasting on 98.5. In February 2024 WDLS and it's FM translator left the air due to a transmitter failure, the stations owner Mangum Communications also at that time took down the stations website and any mention of it on their companies website leaving the future of the station uncertain.

As of April 2024 WDLS returned to the air with a simulcast of WBOO identifying on air jointly as "B102.9 & 98.5".

== History ==
The station was founded in 1969 by Obed S. Borgen and originally went on the air as WWDA on 990 kHz (the call sign stood for "Wonderful Wisconsin Dells Area"). An FM sister station, at 107.1 FM, was added four years later, with John Taylor as the general manager. Taylor Electric Company acquired WWDA and the FM station, WQRH) and relaunched the station as WNNO-AM-FM, call letters the AM station would use from the 1970s (during which time it was a Mutual Broadcasting System affiliate) into the 1990s.

The station was sold to Voss Radio, Inc. in 1978, and it continued to simulcast Top 40 music. WNNO-AM-FM split its simulcast and programmed Country Hits in 1982, and broadcast Chicago Cubs baseball from 1983-1985. It was during this time period that the frequency moved from the original AM 990 to the current AM 900 dial position.

Voss sold the station in 1985 to Armada Broadcasting. At this time, WNNO AM returned to simulcasting Top 40 hits with WNNO-FM. One of the principal owners of Armada Broadcasting is the nephew of radio legend Gary Owens, and Gary's liners for WNNO could be heard on the station during this time period.

During the early-mid 90s its format alternated between sports and a simulcast of sister Top-40 station WNNO-FM (106.9), or was otherwise off the air, usually after sunset. WNNO and WNNO-FM had studios together on Superior Street in Wisconsin Dells and would usually be on the air from 6 a.m. to midnight.

In the late 1990s WNNO-AM-FM were purchased by Magnum Radio Group; the studios were moved to Church Street, Wisconsin Dells. By that time, WNNO-AM had become WDLS, and simulcast WIBU-AM (1240) Poynette, which aired Jones Radio Networks' Classic Hit Country format at the time. WNNO-FM became Jones Hot AC under the name "Mix 106".

By 2000, WIBU and WDLS had become adult standards simulcasting Jones' Music of Your Life format. WIBU was later sold off and WDLS became WIBU while continuing to air the adult standards format.

In September 2007, the station returned to Classic Country, initially running programming from Westwood One before dropping Westwood One programming by 2015.

Former WDLS logo as a classic country station

In September 2023 WDLS signed on an FM translator at 98.5 FM broadcasting from a transmitter on the Baraboo Bluffs.

=== Tourist Format ===
The station was the first in the industry to introduce a "visitor information" format since the format signed on during the Memorial Day weekend of 2004. Its approach emphasized tips and suggestions to help visitors make the best of their vacation time in the popular resort region, even to the point of actually encouraging visitors to come into the studios on Broadway in Downtown Wisconsin Dells and relate their experiences. The station's musical playlist was broad, extending to oldies, 1970s and 1980s hits, country standards and soft hits. Since its audio stream went online in Spring 2005, it became the #1 online radio station in the world of its type. In September 2007, the station returned to its original format of classic country.

In March 2005, the online audio stream of WDLS-AM, as powered by Warp Radio, went live on its website to further increase its potential audience across the Internet.

Within weeks of its launch, its audio stream became the #1 online streaming radio station for its genre, attracting listeners (and subsequent e-mail inquiries about the Wisconsin Dells area) from around the world.

In December 2006, hosting for the online stream was moved to Surfer Network.

On February 10, 2024, WDLS went silent due to a failed isocoupler. WDLS returned to the air in April 2024.

== See also ==
- WNNO-FM, WDLS's sister station
