= WKTC =

Television station in Sumter, South Carolina

- Sumter–Columbia, South Carolina; United States
- City: Sumter, South Carolina
- Channels: Digital: 31 (UHF); Virtual: 63
- Branding: WKTC 63

Programming
- Affiliations: 63.1: Independent with MyNetworkTV; for others, see § Subchannels

Ownership
- Owner: WBHQ Columbia, LLC

History
- Founded: April 19, 1990
- First air date: November 8, 1997
- Former call signs: WQHB (1997–2003); WBHQ (2003–2006)
- Former channel numbers: Analog: 63 (UHF, 1997–2009); Digital: 39 (UHF, until 2019); Translator: W67DP (1998–2007)
- Former affiliations: UPN (primary 1997–2001, secondary 2001–2004); The WB (secondary 1997–2001, primary 2001–2006); Pax TV (per program, 1998–2001); MyNetworkTV (primary 2006–2014, secondary 2014–2019); Telemundo (63.2, 2010–2025); The CW (2014–2019)
- Call sign meaning: WK Television of Columbia

Technical information
- Licensing authority: FCC
- Facility ID: 40902
- ERP: 426 kW
- HAAT: 391 m (1,283 ft)
- Transmitter coordinates: 34°6′58.4″N 80°45′49.9″W

Links
- Public license information: Public file; LMS

WKTC (channel 63) is a television station licensed to Sumter, South Carolina, United States, serving the Columbia area. It is programmed primarily as an independent station, but maintains a secondary affiliation with MyNetworkTV. Locally owned by WBHQ Columbia, LLC, WKTC maintains studios in the Pontiac Business Center complex in Elgin and a transmitter on Rush Road (southeast of I-20) in rural southwestern Kershaw County.

== History ==
The station first signed on the air on November 8, 1997, as WQHB; it originally operated as a primary UPN and secondary WB affiliate, with The WB's prime time programming airing on a one-day delay from 6 to 8 p.m. It also aired select programming from Pax TV (now Ion Television) following that network's 1998 launch. The station's original main transmitter in Sumter was not nearly strong enough to provide a decent over-the-air signal to Columbia; as a result, WQHB began operating a fill-in translator in Columbia, W67DP (channel 67).

In 2001, the station became a primary WB affiliate, shifting UPN prime time programming to the late evening hours from 10 p.m. to midnight, after The WB's prime time schedule. Pax TV programming was dropped altogether at this time. In 2003, the station changed its call letters to WBHQ (reversing the last three letters of its original calls) and moved its transmitter to space on the tower of ABC affiliate WOLO-TV (channel 25) near Camden. This gave the station an over-the-air coverage area comparable to Columbia's other full-power stations, enabling it to shut down the channel 67 translator. It also changed its on-air branding from "WB63" to "Midlands' WB4" (a reference to its cable channel placement in the market on Time Warner Cable). During this period, it moved to its current studio facilities in Elgin. WBHQ dropped UPN programming on August 27, 2004, leaving the market without a UPN affiliate until Roberts Broadcasting signed on WZRB (channel 47) on January 1, 2005.

On January 24, 2006, the Warner Bros. unit of Time Warner and CBS Corporation announced that the two companies would shut down The WB and UPN and combine the networks' respective programming to create a new "fifth" network called The CW. On February 22, 2006, News Corporation announced the launch of a new "sixth" network called MyNetworkTV, which would be operated by Fox Television Stations and its syndication division Twentieth Television, which was created to give UPN and WB stations that would not become CW affiliates another option besides converting to independent stations. On March 25, it was announced that WBHQ would become MyNetworkTV's Columbia affiliate.

On June 26, 2006, the station changed its call letters to WKTC (standing for "Television of Columbia", according to the station's co-owner). On June 28, the station began running advertisements in the Columbia Free Times newspaper featuring the cast of one of MyNetworkTV's original telenovelas Desire, with the text "September 5 / It's a whole new ballgame," alongside a stylized "My 63" logo and the new call letters. In August 2007, WBHQ Columbia, LLC converted W67DP into the market's Telemundo affiliate, using the calls "WNXG". Later that month, WKTC began operating its full-power digital signal on channel 39. WBHQ Columbia, LLC also signed on a low-power MyNetworkTV-affiliated station in Wilmington, North Carolina, W47CK (branded as "WMYW"), and a low-power Telemundo-affiliated station in Savannah, Georgia, WHDS-LD.

WKTC became digital-only, effective June 12, 2009.

W67DP went dark in June 2010; on June 3, 2011, its license was canceled by the Federal Communications Commission due to inactivity. Telemundo programming continued on the second subchannel of WKTC until 2025, when it was moved to low-power station WTES-LD.

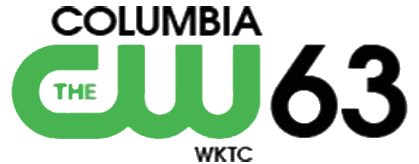
WKTC's former CW era logo.

On December 11, 2013, Roberts Broadcasting received United States bankruptcy court approval to sell WZRB to Ion Media Networks, which converted the station into an Ion Television owned-and-operated station on February 10, 2014. WZRB continued to carry The CW as a secondary affiliation in the interim until March 17, 2014, when the network's programming moved to WKTC as a primary affiliation; the station then changed its on-air branding to "Columbia CW 63". As a result of the change, WKTC pushed MyNetworkTV two hours later, running from 10 p.m. to midnight after CW prime time programming. WKTC regained the title of the only television station in the United States to carry both The CW and MyNetworkTV on its primary channel. Since then, WPWR-TV in Chicago (a Fox-owned MyNetworkTV station that affiliated with The CW from 2016 until 2019), WUAB in Cleveland (the MyNetworkTV affiliation in that market has since moved to a digital subchannel of its sister station WOIO) and KFMB-DT2 in San Diego have joined WKTC in carrying both networks.

On May 29, 2019, The CW announced that it would move its Columbia affiliation from WKTC to the second subchannel of WIS (channel 10), effective September 30. WKTC replaced CW prime time programming with The Doctors and Judge Jerry (with the latter also airing in place of The CW's Jerry Springer repeat) while otherwise keeping their schedule unchanged outside of acquired E/I programming on Saturday mornings. The station also acquired the Grit affiliation abandoned by WIS-DT3 in the move for their seventh subchannel (WIS-DT3 now carries Bounce TV, which moved from WIS-DT2 as a result).

== Sports programming ==
In January 2012, WKTC began broadcasting Southeastern Conference college basketball games from ESPN Plus–operated SEC Network (later SEC TV), sharing with WOLO-TV. This ended after the 2013–2014 season because of the launch of the cable-exclusive SEC Network in August 2014.

== Subchannels ==
The station's signal is multiplexed:

Subchannels of WKTC
Subchannel	Res.	Short name	Programming
63.1	1080i	WKTC-HD	Main WKTC programming
63.2	480i	AmCrime	NBC True CRMZ
63.3	480i	CoziTV	Cozi TV
63.4	480i	LaffTV	Laff
63.5	480i	GritTV	Grit
63.6	480i	GetTV	Great

Prior to November 2009, WKTC carried the Retro Television Network on digital subchannel 63.2. In November 2009, WKTC began carrying a simulcast of low-power station W67DP/WNXG on 63.2, shifting RTV to digital channel 63.3. In November 2011, WKTC began carrying Antenna TV on its 63.3 subchannel, thus shifting RTV once again, this time to digital subchannel 63.4. W67DP would go dark by June 2010. Retro TV would be removed on October 1, 2017, when a contract with Katz Broadcasting to carry Laff and Escape went into effect, which was notable as WKTC was the final Retro TV affiliate nationwide which held a major broadcast network affiliation on their main subchannel.
