= WZRB =

Television station in Columbia, South Carolina

- Columbia, South Carolina; United States
- Channels: Digital: 25 (UHF); Virtual: 47

Programming
- Affiliations: 47.1: Ion Television; for others, see § Subchannels

Ownership
- Owner: Ion Media; (Ion Media License Company, LLC)

History
- First air date: January 1, 2005
- Former channel numbers: Analog: 47 (UHF, 2005–2009); Digital: 47 (UHF, 2009–2019)
- Former affiliations: UPN (2005–2006); The CW (primary 2006–February 2014, secondary February–March 2014)
- Call sign meaning: Roberts Broadcasting (former owner)

Technical information
- Licensing authority: FCC
- Facility ID: 136750
- ERP: 155 kW
- HAAT: 192 m (630 ft)
- Transmitter coordinates: 34°2′39″N 80°59′50″W

Links
- Public license information: Public file; LMS
- Website: iontelevision.com

WZRB (channel 47) is a television station in Columbia, South Carolina, United States, airing programming from the Ion Television network. Owned by the Ion Media subsidiary of the E. W. Scripps Company, the station maintains transmitter facilities on Cushman Drive (near US 1) on the northeast side of Columbia.

== History ==
=== Early history ===
The station first signed on the air on January 1, 2005, as the sixth commercial television station to sign on the air in the Columbia television market. Founded by St. Louis–based Roberts Broadcasting, it originally operated as a UPN affiliate. Prior to WZRB's sign-on, Sumter-licensed WB affiliate WBHQ (channel 63, now WKTC) carried UPN programming on a secondary basis, airing its prime time schedule on a two-hour delay. UPN programming was not available at all in the Columbia market for a few months after WBHQ dropped its secondary affiliation with UPN in August 2004.

On January 24, 2006, the Warner Bros. unit of Time Warner and CBS Corporation announced that the two companies would shut down The WB and UPN and combine the networks' respective programming to create a new "fifth" network called The CW. WZRB became Columbia's CW affiliate when the network launched on September 18, 2006; WKTC took the MyNetworkTV affiliation, and joined that network when it launched two weeks earlier on September 5.

=== Sale to Gary Chapman and switch to Ion ===
On December 2, 2013, Roberts filed an application with the Federal Communications Commission (FCC) to sell WZRB to Radiant Light Ministries, a subsidiary of religious broadcaster Tri-State Christian Television; however, on December 11, the United States bankruptcy court gave initial approval for a plan by Roberts' creditors to instead transfer WZRB and its sister stations, WRBU in St. Louis and WAZE-LP in Evansville, Indiana, to a trust overseen by former LIN Media CEO Gary Chapman with Ion Media Networks (a creditor in Roberts' Chapter 11 bankruptcy proceedings) as its beneficiary, with Roberts' attorney subsequently stating that Ion would purchase the three stations.

On February 10, 2014, WZRB became an Ion affiliate, carry the network's programming for the majority of its broadcast day, resulting in the removal of WZRB's syndicated programming inventory in the process. For the first month of its tenure as an Ion O&O, CW programming—including prime time shows—continued to air on the station as a secondary affiliation, preempting one hour of Ion's daytime lineup and the first two hours of its prime time schedule (although the Vortexx children's block on Saturday mornings, was aired one hour earlier than the network's recommended timeslot nationwide, at 6 a.m. in order to accommodate Ion programming that started at 11 a.m.). This was a departure from the standard Ion programming structure (in which stations carry only Ion programming with limited to no local content and no acquired programming outside of that offered by the network); as a result, it marked the first time since 2009, the end of a three-year period in which Ion Media Networks ran MyNetworkTV programming on select i/Ion owned-and-operated stations, that the company had carried another network's programming on its stations. This arrangement proved to be only temporary, as existing MyNetworkTV affiliate WKTC took the CW affiliation on March 17, 2014, allowing WZRB to carry the entire Ion Television schedule.

=== Eventual sale to Ion Media ===
On January 29, 2015, Cedar Creek Broadcasting (a company controlled by Brian Brady, who also owns several other broadcasting companies such as Northwest Broadcasting) agreed to purchase WZRB and WRBU from the trust for $6 million; following the deal's completion, Ion would have continued to provide services to the stations, and they would continue to be Ion affiliates. The deal was paused during the 2016 election season, likely to see if the regulatory climate would change. On May 9, 2017, the Broadcast Trust informed the FCC that the sale to Cedar Creek Broadcasting had been terminated. One month later on June 20, 2017, Ion Media Networks announced that it would purchase WZRB and WRBU from the Chapman-owned/Ion-managed trust for an undisclosed amount, after regulations previously disallowing the purchase were repealed. The sale was completed on October 19, 2017.

== Technical information ==
=== Subchannels ===
The station's signal is multiplexed:

Subchannels of WZRB
Subchannel	Res.	Short name	Programming
47.1	720p	ION	Ion Television
47.2	480i	CourtTV	Court TV
47.3	480i	Mystery	Ion Mystery
47.4	480i	IONPlus	Ion Plus
47.5	480i	Catchy	Catchy Comedy
47.6	480i	BUSTED	Busted
47.7	480i	GameSho	Game Show Central
47.8	480i	QVC2	QVC2
47.9	480i	HSN2	HSN2

Because it was granted an original construction permit after the FCC finalized the DTV allotment plan on April 21, 1997, the station did not receive a companion channel for a digital television station. Instead, during the week of January 19, 2009, before February 17, 2009, which was the end of the digital television conversion period for most full-service stations, WZRB turned off its analog signal and turned on its digital signal (called a "flash-cut").

On March 29, 2011, WZRB's license was initially canceled by the FCC for failure to file for either a license to cover or an extension of its digital construction permit (the license for sister station WRBJ-TV in Jackson, Mississippi, was initially canceled for the same reasons two days later). However, Roberts Broadcasting filed an appeal, stating that the licenses to cover were improperly filed upon the digital transition. The FCC agreed, and reinstated the licenses of the two stations on April 19. Roberts had to file for new licenses to cover.
