= Roberts Broadcasting =

United States media company

Roberts Broadcasting Company is a media company based in St. Louis, Missouri. It is a subsidiary of the parent company, the Roberts Companies, one of the largest African American-owned conglomerates. It is co-owned by brothers Steven and Michael Roberts.

== History ==
=== Problems ===
Roberts Broadcasting filed for Chapter 11 bankruptcy protection on October 7, 2011; the company cited the loss of the UPN affiliations for WRBU, WZRB, and WRBJ when that network shut down in favor of The CW in 2006, as much of UPN's programming consisted of minority-targeted programs that Roberts felt were compatible with their stations' target audiences (though the stations have since recovered from this setback; additionally, WAZE had instead affiliated with The WB prior to 2006, as it was owned by South Central Communications until February 2007). The company has also been hit with lawsuits from Warner Bros. Television, Twentieth Television, and CBS Television Distribution over fees for syndicated programming; Roberts eventually settled with Twentieth but lost the Warner Bros. and CBS cases.

On March 24, 2011, the Federal Communications Commission (FCC) canceled WAZE's license for failure to construct its digital facilities. However, the station continued to broadcast via their analog translator station network of three stations.

On February 20, 2012, Roberts Broadcasting announced it was exploring the possibility of selling one or all four of its television stations in order to raise enough cash to pay off its creditors. On October 22, 2012, Roberts announced that it had sold WRBJ to Trinity Broadcasting Network; the deal was approved by a bankruptcy court on January 17, 2013, and TBN officially took over operational control of WRBJ five months later, on May 24, 2013. The CW would return to the Jackson area on WJTV-DT2 in September 2013.

On January 3, 2013, the repeater network of WAZE ceased operations, with WTVW hurriedly joining the CW at the end of the month to maintain the network in the Evansville area. In April 2013, WRBU dropped MeTV as a sub-channel; that network now airs in St. Louis on a KMOV sub-channel.

On December 2, 2013, Roberts filed to sell WZRB to Radiant Light Ministries, a subsidiary of Tri-State Christian Television, for $2 million. On December 4, Roberts also filed to sell WRBU to TCT for $5.5 million. However, on December 11, the United States bankruptcy court gave initial approval for a plan by Roberts' creditors to instead transfer WRBU, WZRB, and the WAZE repeaters to a trust with Ion Media Networks (a creditor in Roberts' Chapter 11 bankruptcy proceedings) as its beneficiary, with Roberts' attorney subsequently stating that Ion would purchase the stations for $7.75 million. Roberts had earlier proposed an alternate plan that would have had only the WAZE repeaters be transferred to the trust, which would have allowed the sale of WRBU and WZRB to TCT. The FCC approved the deal on February 2, 2014, and both WZRB and WRBU became Ion Television O&O afterwards. WZRB would keep carrying CW as second affiliate, but WKTC announced that they would become a CW affiliate on March 17.

== Stations ==
=== Radio stations ===
Market	Station	Owned Since	Current Format	Station Branding
Jackson, Mississippi	WRBJ-FM/97.7	2007	Urban Contemporary	97.7 WRBJ

=== Former television stations ===
City of license / Market	Station	Channel TV (RF)	Years owned	Current ownership status
East St. Louis, Illinois/St. Louis, Missouri	WRBU	46 (47)	1989–2014	Ion Television owned-and-operated (O&O)
Cookville/Nashville, Tennessee	WNPX-TV	28 (36)	1997–1998	Ion Television owned-and-operated (O&O)
Magee - Jackson, Mississippi	WRBJ	34 (34)	2006–2013	TBN owned-and-operated (O&O)
Columbia, South Carolina	WZRB	47 (47)	2005–2014	Ion Television owned-and-operated (O&O)
Madisonville, Kentucky - Evansville, Indiana	WAZE-TV	19 (20)	2006–2011	defunct, went dark in 2011
Madisonville, Kentucky - Evansville, Indiana	WAZE-LP (former satellite of WAZE)	17 (analog only)	2006–2013	defunct
Madisonville, Kentucky - Evansville, Indiana	WJPS-LP (former satellite of WAZE)	4 (analog only)	2006–2013	Defunct
Madisonville, Kentucky - Evansville, Indiana	WIKY-LP (former satellite of WAZE)	5 (analog only)	2006–2013	Defunct
