= WBOO =

- Reedsburg, Wisconsin; United States
- Frequency: 102.9 MHz
- Branding: B102.9 & 98.5

Programming
- Format: Adult contemporary
- Affiliations: Packers Radio Network

Ownership
- Owner: Magnum Communications
- Sister stations: WNFM, WRDB, WNNO-FM, WDLS, WBKY, WDDC, WAUN

History
- First air date: 1997 (as WBDL)
- Former call signs: WBDL (1996–2021)
- Call sign meaning: Baraboo

Technical information
- Licensing authority: FCC
- Facility ID: 59232
- Class: A
- ERP: 3,600 watts
- HAAT: 129 meters (423 ft)
- Transmitter coordinates: 43°35′32.00″N 90°0′42.00″W
- Repeater: 900 WDLS (Wisconsin Dells)

Links
- Public license information: Public file; LMS
- Webcast: Listen Live
- Website: wbooradio.com

WBOO (102.9 FM) is a radio station broadcasting an adult contemporary format. Licensed to Reedsburg, Wisconsin, United States, the station is owned by Magnum Communications.

Logo under previous WBDL calls

== Programming ==
WBOO features adult contemporary music from Westwood One, News from Fox News Radio in addition to local sporting events. It previously carried adult contemporary music from ABC Radio.

The call letters were changed from WBDL to WBOO on August 24, 2021, in a swap with the former WBOO-LP, a television station at Elk Mound that Magnum Radio then sold to Morgan Murphy Media.

As of April 2024 WBOO began simulcasting on AM sister station WDLS as well as its FM translator, identifying jointly as B102 and 98.5. This pairing gives WBOO some extended coverage into the Madison area as the WDLS 98.5 FM transmitter is situated on the Baraboo Range and affords a signal to the area that is not disrupted by Madison LPFM WMUU which is a co-channel neighbor on 102.9.
