= WEQL =

Radio station in La Crosse, Wisconsin

La Crosse, Wisconsin; United States
- Broadcast area: La Crosse area
- Frequency: 104.9 MHz (HD Radio)
- Branding: Prayz Network

Programming
- Format: Contemporary Christian
- Network: Prayz Network

Ownership
- Owner: The Salvation Poem Foundation

History
- First air date: 1975 (as WLXR-FM)
- Former call signs: WLXR-FM (1973–2020); WGSL (2020–2023)

Technical information
- Licensing authority: FCC
- Facility ID: 7057
- Class: A
- ERP: 800 watts
- HAAT: 201 m (659 ft)
- Transmitter coordinates: 43°43′16.9″N 91°17′24.5″W

Links
- Public license information: Public file; LMS
- Website: prayznetwork.com

WEQL (104.9 FM) is a radio station broadcasting a contemporary Christian format. Licensed to La Crosse, Wisconsin, United States, the station serves the La Crosse area. The station is currently owned by The Salvation Poem Foundation.

Originally WLXR-FM, the station changed its call sign to WGSL on July 31, 2020, coinciding with the sale of the station by Mississippi Valley Broadcasters to The Salvation Poem Foundation. On August 1, 2020, the station's hot adult contemporary format moved from 104.9 to translator 97.9 K250AZ (which relays WKBH-HD2). Simultaneously, the 104.9 frequency switched to the "Prayz Network" contemporary Christian format. Prior to its former hot AC format, the station was La Crosse's dominant CHR station in the 1980s.

On November 20, 2023, the station changed its call sign to WEQL.
