= Ion Television =

American television network

- Type: Broadcast television network; FAST television channel
- Country: United States
- Broadcast area: Nationwide
- Affiliates: List of Ion affiliates; List of Ion O&Os
- Headquarters: West Palm Beach, Florida

Programming
- Language: English
- Picture format: 720p (HDTV); 480i (SDTV) 16:9 widescreen or 4:3

Ownership
- Owner: E. W. Scripps Company
- Parent: Ion Media; (Scripps Networks, LLC)
- Sister channels: Bounce TV; Court TV; Grit; Ion Mystery; Ion Plus; Laff; Scripps News

History
- Founded: January 1995; 31 years ago (as inTV)
- Launched: August 31, 1998; 28 years ago
- Founder: Bud Paxson
- Former names: Pax TV (1998–2005); i: Independent Television (2005–2007)

Links
- Website: iontelevision.com

Availability

Streaming media
- Services: DirecTV Stream; Frndly TV; FuboTV; Google TV; Peacock; PLEX; Pluto TV; Prime Video Live TV; The Roku Channel; Samsung TV Plus; Sling Freestream; The CW app; Tubi; Vizio WatchFree+; YouTube TV

Ion Television (referred to on-air as simply Ion) is an American broadcast television network and group of FAST television channels owned by the Ion Media division of the Scripps Networks subsidiary of the E. W. Scripps Company. The network first began broadcasting on August 31, 1998, as Pax TV, focusing primarily on family-oriented entertainment programming. It rebranded as i: Independent Television (commonly referred to as "i") on July 1, 2005, converting into a general entertainment network featuring recent and older acquired programs. The network adopted its identity as Ion Television on January 29, 2007.

For many years, Ion has focused primarily on off-network reruns of existing series, with most of its current schedule devoted to marathon blocks of procedural dramas, along with occasional broadcasts of films (including television films during the Christmas season). In the past, Ion had acquired first-run airings of Canadian series not picked up by other American networks and had also been infamous for devoting much of its schedule to infomercials. Under Scripps ownership, Ion has increasingly added national sports programming from the newly established Scripps Sports division, beginning with packages of Women's National Basketball Association basketball and National Women's Soccer League soccer.

Ion is available throughout most of the United States through its group of 44 owned-and-operated stations and 20 network affiliates, as well as through distribution on pay-TV providers and AVOD streaming services; since 2014, the network has also increased affiliate distribution in several markets through the digital subchannels of local television stations owned by companies such as Gray Television and Nexstar Media Group where the network is unable to maintain a main channel affiliation with or own a standalone station, for the same purpose as the distribution of Ion's main network feed via pay-TV providers and streaming services.

The network's stations cover all of the top 20 U.S. markets and 37 of the top 50 markets. Ion's owned-and-operated stations cover 64.8% of the United States population, by far the most of any American station ownership group; it is able to circumvent the legal limit of covering 39% of the population because all of its stations operate on the UHF television band, which is subject to a discount in regard to that limit. In the digital age, the restoration of the UHF discount has proven controversial with other broadcast groups and FCC rulings between presidential administrations, though as the network's parent company mainly acquired low-performing stations and stations on the fringes of markets which targeted lower-profile cities in the analog age, it has not been an issue with Ion Media itself.

== History ==
=== PAX (1998–2005) ===
The network's original logo as Pax TV (a.k.a. Pax, stylized as "PAX"), used from August 31, 1998, to June 30, 2005. An initial version (as well as a prototype logo used prior to launch) featured a dove above the "X."

The network was launched by Bud Paxson, co-founder of the Home Shopping Network and chairman of parent company Paxson Communications (the forerunner to Ion Media). It was originally to be called Pax Net, but was renamed Pax TV (often referred to as simply "Pax"; stylized as "PAX") – a dual reference to its founder and corporate parent, and the Latin word for "peace" – shortly before its launch. Paxson, who felt that television programs aired by other broadcast networks were too raunchy and not family-friendly enough, had decided to create a network that he perceived as an alternative. Since the new network would focus on programming tailored to family audiences, PAX maintained a considerably more conservative programming content policy than the major commercial television networks (NBC, CBS, ABC, & Fox), restricting profanity, violence and sexual content; accordingly, many of the network's acquired programs were edited to remove sexual and overt violent content, while profane language was muted.

Most of the network's initial affiliates were Paxson Communications-owned affiliate stations of the Infomall TV Network (inTV), a network launched by Paxson in 1995 that relied mainly on infomercials and other brokered programming. During the late spring and summer of 1998, a half-hour preview special hosted by former Waltons star Richard Thomas, featuring interviews with Lowell Paxson about PAX's development and initial programming, aired on inTV stations slated to become charter outlets of the new network.

PAX launched on August 31, 1998, with the network's initial schedule being much larger in scope than it would be in later years. At launch, Pax aired general entertainment programming on weekdays from 11:00 a.m. to 11:00 p.m. and weekends from 3:00 p.m. to 10:00 p.m. Central Time. Through an agreement with then-Disney owned animation studio DIC Productions L.P., its schedule also included a children's program block called "Cloud Nine" on Saturdays from 5:00 a.m. to 10:00 a.m. and Sundays from 6:00 a.m. to 8:00 a.m. Central. In addition, the network aired religious programming through time-lease agreements with The Worship Network (which aired its overnight programming on PAX seven nights a week) and Praise TV (featuring Contemporary Christian music and other faith-based programs aimed at teenagers and young adults, which aired on Friday and Saturday late-nights from 11:00 p.m. to 2:00 am. Central until 2000). The remainder of the schedule was filled by paid programming.

Initial programming on PAX consisted of first-run shows (such as the true story profile series It's a Miracle, game show The Reel to Reel Picture Show, and talk shows Woman's Day and Great Day America), along with reruns of older programming (including Highway to Heaven, Here's Lucy, The Hogan Family, Dave's World, Touched by an Angel, and new episodes and older reruns of Candid Camera, the latter of which moved to the network following the revival series' cancellation by CBS earlier in 1998). The network also produced some original drama series such as Sue Thomas: F.B.Eye, Doc, Mysterious Ways (which originated on NBC), Hope Island and Twice in a Lifetime through its programming division, Paxson Entertainment. PAX also aired many game shows including first-run revivals of established games that originated on cable networks such as Supermarket Sweep and Shop 'til You Drop, along with some original game shows such as On the Cover, Balderdash, Dirty Rotten Cheater, a 2002 revival of Beat the Clock, Hollywood Showdown (in conjunction with Game Show Network, which also aired the show) and reruns of Born Lucky. The network would later carry reruns of the syndicated revival of Family Feud (consisting of episodes from Louie Anderson, Richard Karn and John O'Hurley's tenures as host, airing on a one-year delay from their original syndication broadcast) and, due to its alliance with NBC, The Weakest Link (both from the Anne Robinson-hosted network run and the George Gray-hosted syndicated version) as well as the 2000 revival of Twenty-One.

In September 1999, National Broadcasting Company, Inc. purchased a 32% share of Paxson Communications for $415 million in convertible stock, with an option to expand its interest to 49% by February 2002, pending changes in ownership regulations set by the Federal Communications Commission (FCC) that would allow it to acquire additional television stations. NBC later sold its share in the network back to Paxson in November 2003.

In lieu of a national news program, in 2000, Paxson Communications signed an agreement with Jackson, Mississippi-based WeatherVision – which mainly produces weather forecast inserts for television stations in certain markets that do not operate an in-house news department or maintain a news share agreement with another local station – to produce Tomorrow's Weather Tonight, a five-minute national forecast segment that aired Monday through Friday nights at the conclusion of PAX's entertainment schedule. Starting in 2000, many PAX stations also entered into news share agreements with a local major network affiliate (mostly involving NBC-affiliated stations, though some involved an affiliate of ABC, CBS, or Fox) to air tape-delayed broadcasts of evening, and in some markets, morning newscasts from the partner station; in a few cases, the agreement partner produced live newscasts for the PAX station (as examples of the latter, NBC affiliate WTHR in Indianapolis produced a prime time newscast for PAX O&O WIPX-TV from February to June 2005, after CBS affiliate WISH-TV (now a CW affiliate) took over production of the newscast that WTHR had been producing for UPN affiliate WNDY-TV (now a MyNetworkTV affiliate) since 1996; Cleveland NBC affiliate WKYC-TV produced evening newscasts for WVPX-TV that focused primarily on that O&O's city of license, nearby Akron). In some cities, a major network affiliate also provided some engineering and other back office services for the PAX station.

In an effort to increase revenue due to low viewership and other financial issues, PAX gradually increased the amount of paid programming content on its schedule throughout the early 2000s, at the expense of its general entertainment programming. Infomercials and other types of brokered programs ultimately became the dominant form of programming during the network's broadcast day; by January 2005, the time that PAX had allocated to entertainment programs had been reduced to six hours on weekdays (from 5:00 p.m. to 11:00 p.m.) and five hours on weekends (from 5:00 p.m. to 10:00 p.m. Central Time). Original programming was also affected by the network's programming changes; PAX was originally offering five or six new series each season. However, in 2003, the number of new series that aired on PAX dwindled to just two: Sue Thomas: F.B.Eye, which was cancelled in 2005, and Doc, which was cancelled in 2004 after PAX's international backer, Canadian broadcast network CTV, pulled out of producing the shows. The network seemingly recovered a year later when seven series made it to PAX's 2004–05 schedule.

=== i (2005–2007) ===
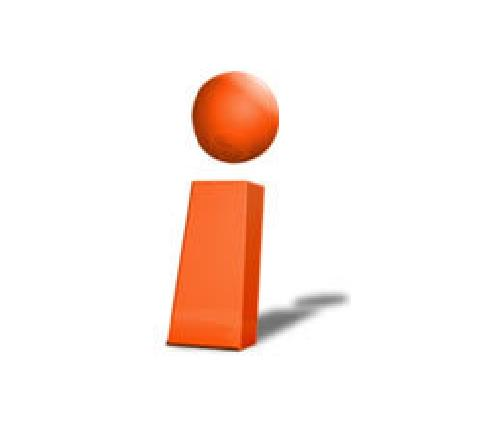
Logo for i: Independent Television

On June 28, 2005, Paxson Communications announced that it would rebrand PAX as i: Independent Television, to reflect a new strategy of "providing an independent broadcast platform for producers and syndicators who desire to reach a national audience." The network used a lowercase letter "i" for its branding and other items such as its electronic program guide listings.

The rebranding also resulted in several changes to its programming lineup: paid programming replaced overnight programming from The Worship Network, which began to carry its full 24-hour schedule on a fourth digital subchannel of local i owned-and-operated stations and affiliates until the network was dropped in January 2010; in addition, Tomorrow's Weather Tonight and rebroadcasts of network affiliate newscasts were discontinued the day prior to the rebrand on June 30, 2005 (though a few stations not owned by the network's parent company retained news share agreements with major network stations after that date, such as WBNA in Louisville, Kentucky, which continued to air newscasts from NBC affiliate WAVE). The network shifted its format almost entirely to reruns of television series from the 1960s to the 1990s (such as Green Acres, Amen, and Pax holdover Diagnosis: Murder) and feature films, reruns of former Pax TV series (such as Doc) and first-run episodes (and later reruns) of Pax holdover series America's Most Talented Kids were also included as part of the schedule. In turn, the network adapted its programming content standards to those similar to other broadcast networks. During the 2005–06 season, the network launched only one new series that met the network's new mission of being an "independent broadcast platform", the teen drama Palmetto Pointe, which only lasted five episodes and was criticized as a poor imitation of Dawson's Creek and One Tree Hill; the network went entirely to a lineup of reruns with limited original programming for the 2006–07 season (except for Health Report and specials branded under the name iHealth).

At one point in this era, the network programmed eighteen hours of paid programming per day, ¾ of the network's broadcast day, with the network only programming the early fringe and prime time periods with traditional programming.

In November 2005, NBCUniversal was granted a transferable option to purchase a controlling stake in Paxson Communications. Had this option been exercised, NBC would have acquired approximately 63 i owned-and-operated stations (though this could have resulted in a forced divestiture of either i or Spanish network Telemundo, which NBC had acquired in April 2002 (prior to its merger with Vivendi Universal), along with the divested network's O&Os due to FCC rules that prohibit broadcasters from owning more than two television stations in the same market unless there are either a minimum of 20 full-power stations in the market or one of the stations is a satellite). As part of the agreement, Lowell Paxson stepped down from his position as chairman of Paxson Communications. In April 2006, published reports surfaced that i owed more than US$250 million to creditors. Standard & Poor's reported a much higher debt in March 2008, owing $867 million to creditors and having a bond rating of CCC+/Outlook Negative.

According to a statement on its website, DirecTV (which ironically had, and still has, multiple networks made up of full-time paid programming) planned to terminate its carriage agreement with i on February 28, 2006. The satellite provider cited that "most of [i Network's] programming consists of infomercials and other promotional shows", despite an earlier promise by network executives that it "would consist of general, family-oriented entertainment". At its peak, infomercial time stretched across eighteen hours of the network's broadcast day, or 126 hours of a 168-hour broadcast week. To appease DirecTV management, the network launched a secondary feed of the network for providers adverse to its over-the-air programming direction, replacing paid programming time with older public domain programs and cancelled Pax TV original series. DirecTV and Paxson then reached a new carriage agreement in May 2006.

On September 15, 2006, i launched Qubo, a children's programming block formed through a partnership with NBCUniversal, Corus Entertainment, Scholastic Entertainment, and Classic Media. The Qubo endeavor also included additional blocks on both NBC and Telemundo that both launched one week earlier on September 9, before expanding into a full 24-hour digital multicast network (alternatively known as Qubo Channel) on i's DT2 subchannel on January 8, 2007.

=== Ion Television (2007–present) ===
Ion Television logo from 2016 to 2021. This logo is still used, just without "TELEVISION" underneath.

Three weeks after Qubo Channel's launch, on January 29, 2007, i changed its name again to Ion Television (as a result of its parent company's renaming to Ion Media Networks). Days after the rebrand, California-based entertainment group Positive Ions, Inc. filed a trademark infringement lawsuit against Ion Media Networks, claiming that the network stole the "Ion" branding. Positive Ions had registered trademarks on the word "Ion" and had used the mark commercially since 1999. On May 14, 2007, Positive Ions filed for an injunction that, if granted, would have required Ion Media Networks to change its name once again. On May 4, 2007, Ion, Citadel Investment Group, and NBC Universal announced a deal to transfer NBC Universal's rights to purchase a controlling stake in Ion to Citadel, in exchange for Citadel investing $100 million into Ion's growth and digital plans.

Ion Television's programming, for the most part, remained unchanged upon the rebrand; the network continued to feature programming from the content deals it signed while under the i brand (such as Who's the Boss?, Mama's Family, Growing Pains, and The Wonder Years). The network also aired a late afternoon sitcom block called "Laugh Attack", which featured reruns of comedy series targeted at African American audiences (originally consisting of Hangin' with Mr. Cooper and The Wayans Bros., the latter of which was later replaced by The Steve Harvey Show).

By November of 2007, Ion Media Networks & Positive Ions reached a settlement in their case. According to reports, the terms of the settlement have been deemed "confidential", but Ion Television will not be forced to change its name.

In January 2008, Ion Media and Comcast reached a carriage agreement to continue carrying Ion Television, while also adding Qubo Channel and Ion Life to the cable provider's channel lineups.

==== 2008 relaunch ====
On May 1, 2008, Ion Television held an upfront presentation announcing its programming for the 2008–09 season at the New York Public Library in Manhattan. In addition to the announcement of its programming acquisitions, the network unveiled a new logo (a wordmark that incorporated a positive ion symbol as a pseudo-period next to the "ion" typeface) and slogan for the network, "Positively Entertaining" (a form of wordplay, as ions are atoms or molecules that have a positive or negative electrical charge).

With the September 8, 2008, rebrand, the network also retooled its focus, emphasizing the key demographic of adults between ages of 18 and 49, and airing more recent acquired programming aimed at young adults (such as Boston Legal, NCIS, and Criminal Minds).

By this point, the network shifted its programming to feature extended blocks of its acquired series (which consist mostly of drama series, with sitcoms becoming an increasingly less integral part of the schedule); it also began a gradual expansion of the number of hours devoted to entertainment shows, starting with the addition of a two-hour block of programming in the late afternoon (from 3:00 p.m. to 5:00 p.m. Central) in January 2008, and expanding further into the daytime and late fringe/early graveyard periods over a five-year span (however, this resulted in the network increasing its reliance on regularly scheduled marathon-style blocks of a relatively small inventory of programs in lieu of acquiring a much larger lineup of series to fill out the schedule). More recent theatrically released feature films were also added to the lineup, alongside older movie releases from the 1980s and 1990s.

In April 2009, it was announced that Ion Media Networks was once again facing balance sheet problems. The company disclosed that it was in discussions with lenders on "a comprehensive recapitalization" of its balance sheet, translating to an effort to restructure its considerable debt, which, according to The Wall Street Journal, stood at $2.7 billion as of April 2009.

The network launched high definition operations in the 720p format, announcing they would do so on January 28, 2009, with an original launch date of February 16, 2009, but delayed to March 16, 2009, after the passage of the DTV Delay Act, which pushed the national digital television transition to June 12, 2009. Most Ion stations began to switch their main signals from 480i standard definition to 720p HD in late February; an early decision to pillarbox 4:3 programming with blue rather than black pillarboxing was eventually abandoned as black coloring became the industry norm. Some Ion-owned and affiliate stations which carry the network as a multicast offering continue to carry the network in 480i widescreen over-the-air.

On May 19, 2009, Ion Media Networks filed for Chapter 11 bankruptcy protection, putting the Ion network under bankruptcy for the second time in its history; it had reached an agreement with holders of 60% of its first lien secured debt that would extinguish the entirety of its $2.7 billion legacy debt and preferred stock, and recapitalize the company with a $150 million new funding commitment. On July 15, 2009, RHI Entertainment entered into a settlement agreement to resolve a dispute with Ion Media Networks, which resulted in the termination of a programming distribution agreement between RHI and Ion.

In November 2010, Ion Television began airing its first made-for-TV movies, in the form of Christmas-themed films that air between the weekend after Thanksgiving (airing the weekend before that holiday in 2013) and Christmas Day, with up to five films premiering each year on the network, although they are advertised as "original movies" in on-air promotions (the 2012 film Anything But Christmas is the only movie aired to date in which Ion Television had actually held a production interest), most of the films are produced by independent film and television studios such as Reel One Entertainment, Hybrid, LLC, The Cartel, and Vancouver-based MarVista Entertainment without the network's financial involvement (Ion does not maintain exclusivity to most of the films, which are also distributed via syndicated film packages or carried by other networks); the network extended these themed made-for-TV movies to other holidays in 2015, with the premieres of the romance films Meet My Valentine (which aired as part of the network's Valentine's Day programming slate) and You Cast a Spell on Me (which aired as part of its "Wicked Week" Halloween block).

=== Purchase by Scripps ===
On September 24, 2020, E. W. Scripps Company agreed to buy Ion Media for $2.65 billion. The transaction, which closed on January 7, 2021, saw Ion Television and its sister networks absorbed into Scripps' Katz Broadcasting subsidiary, which already operates five specialty networks, most notably Bounce TV and Court TV. In regards to Ion Television's programming, Scripps indicated it would maintain the status quo, with no plans at the time to invest in original content or deviate from the channel's off-network programming approach. To get FCC approval for the transaction, 23 Ion Television stations were sold by Scripps to Inyo Broadcast Holdings.

On April 8, 2024, Scripps announced that they would reposition Ion into a general entertainment channel, turning live sports broadcasting as a tentpole of the network with Women's National Basketball Association (WNBA) and National Women's Soccer League (NWSL) games occupying weekly slots in the programming lineup and to launch a refresh of their brand identity and new year-long brand campaign based on the new tagline from the new branding being "Ion. It's On", replacing "Positively Entertaining" after 16 years. Sister channels Ion Mystery and Ion Plus would also be rebranded with similar graphics based on Ion's branding.

== Programming ==
As of July 2026, Ion provides general entertainment programming to owned-and-operated and affiliated stations every day from 6:00 a.m. to 3:00 a.m. Eastern Time (except Fridays outside of the Holiday season which start at 7:00 a.m. ET; awhile the entertainment programming schedule starts at 8:00 a.m. and ends at 1:00 a.m. from Christmas to New Year's Day), with paid programming filling the remaining vacated hours. A children's programming block of Xploration Station from Steve Rotfeld Productions – which features programs compliant with FCC educational programming requirements – airs for three hours each Friday at 7:00 am. Eastern Time. Three hours (Four hours on Fridays) overnight are programmed with compensated religious or commercial paid programming, a comparably small fraction of the paid programming schedule it aired in the past.

The network's format is predominantly devoted to marathon blocks of procedural drama series, such as Blue Bloods, Chicago Fire, Chicago P.D., FBI, Law & Order: Special Victims Unit, NCIS and S.W.A.T.. Consecutive episodes of a given series airing between two and 16 hours a day depending on the day's schedule, with fewer hours in the morning and late fringe. During the Christmas and holiday season, the network also airs holiday-themed made-for-TV films under the banner "Ion Television at the Movies". In addition, the network airs women's sports games, including the Professional Women's Hockey League, National Women's Soccer League and Women's National Basketball Association.

Previously, Ion broadcasts aired feature films released between the 1980s and the 2000s on Sunday afternoon and evenings. Occasionally it also aired short, hosted segments during its prime-time lineup – particularly during film presentations – known as the "Ion Lounge", a lifestyle segment used mainly to advertise a company's product within the featured program's commercial breaks. The network had film distribution deals with Universal Pictures, Paramount Pictures, 20th Century Studios and Warner Bros. Pictures.

Ion previously aired a limited number of comedy or comedy-drama series that were cycled on-and-off the schedule such as Monk, Psych and Married... with Children, with half-hour sitcoms used on certain occasions to fill scheduling gaps prior to the telecast of its late-morning film presentations (usually in the 10:00 a.m. Central Time half-hour, if the succeeding film ran for at least 2 1/2 hours) because of their erratic scheduling. The network later shifted to a more exclusive focus on dramas as part of its series content in January 2015, although the network continued to carry comedic programming in the form of select feature films aired within the "Ion Television at the Movies" block.

Ion owned-and-operated stations and affiliates formerly also provided limited local programming on weekday mornings to fulfill public affairs guidelines, which ranged from entirely local productions to Ion Life-sourced programs within which commercial slots are instead devoted to local physicians or experts giving locality-specific health advice or advertising their services. This programming has ended as the Main Studio Rule repeal by the FCC in 2019 freed Ion stations from this requirement.

Ion also served as the over-the-air broadcast distribution point for TiVo's Teleworld Paid Program, a weekly 30-minute compilation program – usually carried during the overnight on Wednesdays or Thursdays within the network's designated paid programming time – it was specifically coded to distribute program previews and device tutorials for TiVo's digital video recorders; in 2011, the time was used in early September to preview the pilot of Fox's new sitcom New Girl, before its actual Fox premiere on September 20. TiVo discontinued the program in 2016 as broadband had become commonplace enough to end it.

Ion's method of running predominantly syndicated programming is very similar to the international model of broadcasting used in Europe, Canada, Latin America, Asia and Australia, which mixes imported and syndicated shows with original programming – a model used only in United States broadcast television by digital multicast services (particularly those that specialize in acquired programs such as MeTV and Antenna TV), smaller English language entertainment-based networks (such as America One), PBS member stations, and networks broadcasting in languages other than English (such as Univision, UniMás, and Telemundo). The major commercial broadcast networks in the U.S. – ABC, NBC, CBS, Fox, and The CW – carry first-run programs produced for the network, while leaving the responsibility of acquiring shows from the syndication market to their owned-and-operated stations and affiliates to fill time not allotted to network and, where applicable, locally produced programs (The CW Plus and MyNetworkTV, which are somewhat similar to Ion Television in their formats, mixes elements of both models as acquired programs are supplied both during prime time by the services and by their stations at all other times). A limited number of non-Ion-owned stations that are merely affiliated with the network (such as former Louisville outlet WBNA) do carry additional local or syndicated programming that, in some instances, pre-empts certain programs within the Ion master schedule.

=== Programming deals ===
In 2006, Ion Media Networks reached several programming deals, two with major programming suppliers that were announced within a week of each other, and another that among other things would bring original programming to Ion Television's lineup. On June 27, 2006, Ion Media announced a comprehensive programming deal with Warner Bros. Television Distribution, which gave it the broadcast rights to movies and television series owned by the company. One week later on July 5, 2006, Ion announced a similar deal that resulted in the acquisition of broadcast rights to films and series distributed by Sony Pictures Television (now Sony Pictures Television Studios). Starting in September of that year, series and feature films from both libraries were incorporated onto the network's prime time schedule (including Who's the Boss?, Designing Women, Mama's Family, Growing Pains, Green Acres, and The Wonder Years). However, these older series were later dropped when the network shifted towards more recent series. Ion also struck a library content deal with NBCUniversal, which gave it access to shows such as Law & Order.

In September 2008, Ion Television reached a multi-year film rights agreement with Warner Bros. Television Distribution to broadcast more recent movies from Warner Bros. and its related studios. Meanwhile, three series from CBS Television Distribution (now CBS Media Ventures) were added to the schedule: NCIS joined the lineup in September 2008, while Criminal Minds and Ghost Whisperer were added to the Ion Television lineup in 2009. In January 2009, the network announced that it had acquired the broadcast rights to the Canadian television drama series Durham County; that show aired on the network for less than a year.

On January 21, 2011, Ion Television acquired the U.S. television rights to the Canadian drama series Flashpoint, which gave it first-run rights to the fourth season's final 11 episodes, after CBS aired that season's first eight episodes, as well as rights to air reruns of all episodes produced to date and thereafter; Ion (along with the show's originating Canadian broadcaster, CTV) also renewed the series for a fifth and final season that aired during the fall of 2012.

In July 2011, Ion Television acquired the broadcast television rights to six films produced by Starz Media (now Lionsgate) as part of its weekend film block (then branded as the "Big Movie Weekend"); the films started airing on the network in November of that year. Ion also acquired the syndication rights to the USA Network series Psych and Monk from NBCUniversal; the two series respectively began airing in late 2011 and early 2012. House, also from NBCUniversal, joined the network in September 2012. In September 2011, Ion Television acquired the syndication rights to George Lopez and Leverage. George Lopez began airing on September 29, while Leverage debuted in July 2012, the former has since been dropped from the network, while the latter has been cycled on-and-off the schedule.

On October 4, 2011, Ion Television acquired the rights to the first two seasons of the Canadian drama The Listener for broadcast in 2012, with an option for future seasons through an agreement with Shaw Media (parent of the show's originating broadcaster, Global); the series would not join Ion's schedule until March 2014, by which time Ion Television had entered into a co-production arrangement for the program. A similar deal reached in September 2014 with Entertainment One gave Ion the American rights to the medical drama Saving Hope (which made its American debut on NBC in the summer of 2012); Ion began airing first-run episodes and repeats of the series in October 2015.

In December 2011, Ion Television acquired the syndication rights to Cold Case, which debuted in 2012. On June 25, 2012, Ion Television entered into a deal with WWE to air a new hour-long series titled WWE Main Event on Wednesday nights; the series debuted on October 3, 2012 and ran until April 2, 2014.

=== Other programming ===
==== Children's programming ====
Prior to Ion Television's original launch as Pax TV in 1998, the network had reached an agreement with DIC Entertainment to produce a five-hour children's programming block called Freddy's Firehouse, to air on Saturday and Sunday mornings. The block of animated series was instead launched on September 5, 1998, as "Cloud Nine", featuring a trio of winged teenage angels that hosted the wraparound segments that bridged breaks during the block's shows, which were mostly sourced from the DIC library. "Cloud Nine" was discontinued in the spring of 1999, and was replaced by a new block under the title "Pax Kids." The DIC programs were replaced in 2000 with reruns of Jack Hanna's Animal Adventures, which was replaced by Just Deal and California Dreams the following year. Pax TV became the first major commercial broadcast network in the U.S. to not supply children's programming in January 2002, and later one of only two until it restored a children's block in 2006 (UPN eventually joined it in this distinction after it dropped its Disney's One Too block in August 2003, following the termination of a programming agreement with Buena Vista Television). Between 2002 and 2006, Pax and i used original reality series such as Miracle Pets, Animal Tails, and America's Most Talented Kids to fulfill its stations' E/I requirements.

On September 15, 2006, Ion Television debuted a weekly children's program block called "Qubo on Ion Television", through a partnership between Ion Media Networks, NBC Universal, the Nelvana unit of Corus Entertainment, Scholastic Media, Classic Media, and its subsidiary Big Idea Productions. The Qubo block originally debuted on NBC and Telemundo on September 9, 2006, with NBC's Qubo block initially being rebroadcast on Ion Television on Friday afternoons (making it the last weekday afternoon children's block to be carried by a major commercial broadcast network until 2010). On January 4, 2015, the Qubo block on Ion was relaunched as the "Qubo Kids Corner", concurrent with the block's move to Sunday mornings. As mentioned above, Scripps now purchases syndicated programming to meet Ion Television's E/I requirements with its wind-down of Qubo.

==== Sports ====
The network has previously broadcast certain sporting events, including Conference USA college football games (produced by College Sports Television), soccer matches from the Women's United Soccer Association, Real Pro Wrestling (which more resembles the amateur form than the theatrically-based ring sport), the Champions Tour of golf, the Paralympic Games and a weekly mixed martial arts program from BodogFight. In its home state of Florida, the network's stations had served as a statewide chain to carry play-by-play coverage of a number of games for Major League Baseball's Tampa Bay Rays and Florida Marlins (demarcated by each team's territories) until the late 2000s, when cable's Fox Sports Florida and Sun (now Bally Sports Florida and Sun) acquired the exclusive rights to both teams.

Ion Television aired NFL Films' weekly highlight program, the NFL Films Game of the Week on Saturday evenings from September 16, 2007, to January 5, 2008, with its initial broadcast focusing on the September 9, 2007 game between the New York Giants and the Dallas Cowboys. The series was not renewed for the fall 2008 season. Ion also obtained rights to televise games from the American Indoor Football Association, which were slated to begin airing in March 2008. However, the game's producers did not provide a live broadcast and the agreement was terminated.

On December 28, 2010, Ion Television signed a deal with the Ultimate Fighting Championship to air the preliminary fights to the January 1 pay-per-view event UFC 125. Ion also aired the preliminary fights for UFC 127 and UFC 140 later in 2011, before the organization signed an exclusive programming agreement with Fox.

On April 20, 2023, Ion Television, through Scripps Sports, signed a multi-year deal with the Women's National Basketball Association (WNBA) to air a 15-week slate of doubleheader games on Friday nights (branded as WNBA Friday Night Spotlight on ION), beginning with that year's regular season. It will be the first national sports broadcast carried by Ion since 2011, and marks the first ever television contract for Scripps Sports, which was founded by the E. W. Scripps Company in December 2022 to acquire sports events for Ion and the group's local television stations. The agreement also grants local rights to selected Ion O&Os for games involving regional WNBA teams, which stations may carry in early- or late-evening broadcast windows depending on tip-off time.

On November 9, 2023, the National Women's Soccer League announced Scripps Sports as a rightsholder beginning in the 2024 season, with Ion to air Saturday night doubleheaders. Ion will also air the 2024 NWSL Draft.

Following the ratings success of the 2026 Olympic women's hockey final won by Team USA, Ion announced a test broadcast partnership with the Professional Women's Hockey League on March 12, 2026. It started with a regular season game later that month, and continued with the full 2026 Walter Cup Finals series.

== Affiliates ==
As of October 2020, Ion has 64 owned-and-operated stations, and current and pending affiliation agreements with nine additional television stations encompassing 36 states and the District of Columbia. The network has an estimated national reach of 60.63% of all households in the United States (or 189,453,097 Americans with at least one television set). Ion Television has the most owned-and-operated stations of any commercial broadcast network in the United States, reaching 65.1% of the United States (well above the Federal Communications Commission's coverage-based national ownership limit of 39%); it is also the only American commercial broadcast network whose stations almost exclusively consist of network-owned stations, similar to the ownership model of many commercial broadcast networks in Europe, Canada, Latin America, Asia and Australia, and to a somewhat more expansive extent, many U.S.-based religious broadcast networks.

Ion's programming is available by default via a national feed that is distributed directly to pay television providers in markets without a local Ion station (this contrasts with the major networks, which under FCC regulations, allow providers to import an owned-and-operated or affiliate station from a nearby market if no local over-the-air affiliate exists). In some markets, DirecTV carries a "placeholder" simulcast of the national modified feed of the network (for example, Los Angeles area viewers can watch Ion on both channels 30, via local O&O KPXN-TV, and 306; New York City on channel 31 WPXN besides 305).

In most markets with a Scripps or Inyo-owned Ion station outside early mornings, the only sign of the network being carried on a broadcast television station is a small automatically generated station identification on the bottom of the screen at the top of each hour containing the call letters, city of license and state abbreviation, which is repeated across its subchannels.

=== Major market absences and station oddities ===
Ion does not have any over-the-air stations in several major markets.

Two major factors that have limited the network's national broadcast coverage are that unlike the major commercial broadcast networks (ABC, NBC, CBS, and Fox), Ion did not actively seek over-the-air distribution on the digital subchannels of other network-affiliated stations in the five years following the digital television transition (with limited exceptions in Las Vegas, Nevada, Tucson, Arizona and Fresno, California through agreements with Telemundo owned-and- operated stations in those markets), until it reached a multi-station agreement with Media General in November 2015; prior to that deal, it long had very few stations that contractually carry the network's programming (with limited exceptions in markets such as Louisville, Kentucky and Anchorage, Alaska). As a result, Ion Media Networks owns the vast majority of the stations within Ion Television's affiliate body, as well as those of co-owned multicast services Qubo Channel and Ion Life.

In Pittsburgh, a deal by Paxson to buy WPCB-TV and trade it for secondary PBS member station WQEX was approved by the Federal Communications Commission, but rejected by WPCB-TV owner Cornerstone Television in a 2000 controversy; it would not be until November 2010 that Paxson's successor, Ion Media Networks, would successfully buy WQEX, which has since been converted into a commercially licensed outlet as Ion O&O WINP-TV. In Charlotte, independent station WAXN-TV carried some programming aired by the network during its original iteration as Pax TV from 1998 to 2000, but never maintained a formal affiliation. Under an agreement with Fox Television Stations, Ion was added to the fourth digital subcarrier of then owned-and-operated station WJZY on September 29, 2016. Ion in Charlotte later moved to the DT6 feed of WJZY-TV.

St. Louis, at one time, received the network by way of a low-power repeater of O&O WPXS in nearby Mount Vernon, Illinois; in December 2013, the United States bankruptcy court approved a plan by creditors of Roberts Broadcasting to transfer East St. Louis-based MyNetworkTV affiliate WRBU and its sister stations, CW affiliate WZRB in Columbia, South Carolina and former CW affiliate WAZE-LP in Evansville, Indiana, to a trust with Ion Media Networks – a creditor in Roberts' Chapter 11 bankruptcy proceedings, for which it filed in 2011 – that would serve as its beneficiary. Roberts' attorney subsequently stated that Ion would purchase the three stations. WZRB and WRBU switched to Ion in February 2014 (although WZRB retained a secondary affiliation with The CW until MyNetworkTV affiliate WKTC joined the programming service in March); WRBU dropped MyNetworkTV upon becoming an Ion O&O (MyNetworkTV would not return to St. Louis until November 2014, when CBS affiliate KMOV launched a third digital subchannel to serve as an affiliate). WAZE-LP was silent at the time of acquisition, having gone dark the previous year after failing to construct its digital transmitter facilities, and Ion eventually decided on an affiliation deal with Nexstar Media Group's cluster in the area instead, using a subchannel of CW affiliate WTVW.

Buffalo and Rochester, New York, normally treated as separate markets, share Ion affiliate WPXJ-TV, which is centrally located between the two cities and is licensed to Batavia. An equivalent case exists involving Battle Creek, Michigan-licensed WZPX-TV, which serves both the Grand Rapids and Lansing markets (it also unusually served as a secondary WB affiliate due to a lack of stations in both markets until the digital age); additionally, Ann Arbor-licensed WPXD-TV also once provided an equivalent over-the-air signal for Lansing before moving their signal to a new transmitter in the Detroit suburb of Southfield in 2012.

In addition, in several other markets, Ion's predecessor was sold to another television station group to affiliate with a different English or Spanish language network, and through either a lack of channel space or interest in the network, Ion would not reappear in most of those markets until reaching deals to air on digital subchannels of other stations. These include:

- Albuquerque, New Mexico: KAPX (now UniMás owned-and-operated station KTFQ, Ion now on KWBQ 19.4)
- Baraboo, Wisconsin: W43BR (now a Family Channel affiliate, Ion now in Madison on WIFS 57.9)
- Baton Rouge, Louisiana: WLFT-CD (now a religious independent station, Ion now on WVLA 33.3)
- Champaign–Springfield, Illinois: WPXU (now CW affiliate WBUI, Ion now on WAND 17.3)
- Charlottesville, Virginia: WADA-LP (now WVIR-CD (translator of NBC affiliate WVIR-TV), Ion now on WCAV 19.4)
- Fresno–Visalia, California: KPXF (now UniMás owned-and-operated station KTFF, and was formerly on KNSO 51.3)
- Little Rock, Arkansas: KYPX (now MeTV affiliate KMYA; Ion now on KARZ 42.3)
- Montgomery, Alabama: WBMM (first switched to Daystar, now a CW affiliate, Ion now on WAKA 8.3)
- Reno, Nevada: KREN (now an Univision affiliate, Ion now on KTVN 2.3)
- Shreveport, Louisiana: KPXJ (now a CW affiliate, Ion now on KSHV 45.3)
- Sioux Falls, South Dakota: KAUN-LP (now a Retro TV affiliate, Ion now on KELO 11.3)
- Tucson, Arizona: KUVE-DT (now an Univision owned-and-operated station, then on KOLD 13.4. Now on KGUN-TV 9.5)
- Las Vegas/Pahrump, Nevada: KPVM-LD (Now independent; formerly on KLAS-TV subchannel, now on KMCC)
- San Juan, Puerto Rico/Saint Croix, U.S. Virgin Islands: WJPX (now an América TeVé affiliate, Ion now on WSVI 8)

In November 2015, Media General and Ion came to terms on an affiliation deal to add Ion's main feed as a standard definition digital subchannel in non-Ion O&O markets with Media General stations to replace the programming of the long-defunct Live Well Network, the first of its kind for Ion. Ion subchannels were added in markets such as Austin, Texas; Colorado Springs, Colorado; Green Bay, Wisconsin; Lafayette, Indiana; Davenport, Iowa; Lafayette, Louisiana; Lansing, Michigan; Richmond, Virginia; Springfield, Massachusetts; and Wichita, Kansas. These deals would carry over after the Media General stations were integrated into the Nexstar Media Group in January 2017, with WBAY-TV continuing to carry Ion under Gray Television ownership. Morgan Murphy Media's two Wisconsin stations (WISC-TV in Madison and WKBT-DT in La Crosse–Eau Claire) began to carry the network as a third subchannel at the beginning of February 2017. The network further expanded its affiliate reach into small and lower-ranked mid-sized markets during late 2016 and 2017, with Ion Media striking additional deals with companies such as Gray Television, Hubbard Broadcasting, Block Communications, Forum Communications, Heartland Media and the Meredith Corporation to carry Ion Television on digital subchannels of stations owned and/or operated by those groups.

In the fall of 2021, with the purchase of Ion Media by Scripps, it began to end outside contracts in markets with a Scripps station where Ion Television was on a subchannel rather than an Ion station, with the network being activated on Scripps-owned stations as a subchannel on WGBA-TV in Green Bay, Wisconsin (ending the subchannel deal with WBAY), KGUN-TV in Tucson, Arizona (from KOLD-TV), Richmond, Virginia's WTVR-TV (taking over from WRIC-TV), KRIS-TV in Corpus Christi, Texas (from KIII), and WFTX-TV in the Fort Myers, Florida market (rectifying the network's longest absence, as the market previously had no Ion station at all).

In several markets, the station's city of license is considered outside the main portion of a market's metropolitan area. Such cases include Minneapolis–Saint Paul, where that area's Ion O&O, KPXM-TV, is licensed to St. Cloud (60 miles (97 km) northwest of the Twin Cities); Detroit, where affiliate WPXD-TV is licensed to Ann Arbor, Michigan (40 miles (64 km) west of Detroit), though its digital transmitter is located in Southfield, where the bulk of Detroit's television stations base their studios and transmitter facilities; Hartford, where affiliate WHPX-TV is licensed to New London, Connecticut (located 40 miles (64 km) to the southeast), which moved its transmitter to the Farmington Rattlesnake Mountain site in the digital age; and Milwaukee, where O&O WPXE-TV is licensed to Kenosha, with its digital transmitter located at a tower farm on Milwaukee's north side (its former analog transmitter was located south of the city in Racine County). In the Cleveland market, Ion airs on Akron-based WVPX-TV, which had formerly targeted Akron, Canton and nearby areas as an ABC affiliate (then competing with the market's existing ABC station WEWS) prior to 1998.

=== National feeds ===
Separate national feeds (formerly known as "i Plus" or "Ion Plus") have been made available to pay television providers, including Dish Network, DirecTV, Comcast and Charter Communications. On August 16, 2022, Ion Television launched a free ad-supported streaming television feed on The Roku Channel and other advertising-supported video-on-demand streaming providers, including Samsung TV Plus, Vizio WatchFree+, Xumo, Tubi, Pluto TV, PLEX, and TCL Channel. The FAST and AVOD feeds air programming sourced from Ion Plus in place of paid programming that airs on the main network. Prior to the launch of Ion Life, the Ion Plus feeds carried reruns of cancelled Pax original programs (such as Miracle Pets and Beat the Clock), as well as public domain movies and sitcom episodes (such as I Married Joan and The Beverly Hillbillies). The feeds used the Pax name and bug after the network's rebrand as i, until about September 2005. As Ion has refocused towards its current schedule however, along with a de-emphasis on local advertising, the national feed effectively repeats Ion's main feed outside a lack of station identification.

== Related services ==
=== Multiplexing ===
Ion Television's stations have made notable use of "multiplexing" or splitting a digital broadcast television signal into separate subchannels. The network's stations usually carry up to six of these digital subchannels (in contrast with most other full-power stations, which usually carry a maximum of four channels over the same signal), each of which broadcast separate networks. Due to the bandwidth limitations caused by its carriage of multiple subchannels over a single broadcast signal, only the primary Ion network feed is transmitted in high definition, a mode of operation that remains under Scripps ownership. A small number of Ion stations have channel sharing agreements with other broadcasters after the FCC's 2016 spectrum re-allocation auction, while others such as Atlanta-area station WPXA-TV contract with other lower-power stations in a market to provide a full-power signal, such as Telemundo affiliate WKTB-CD.

==== Subchannels ====
===== Qubo =====
Qubo was a children's television network that launched on January 8, 2007, and was carried on the second digital subchannel of Ion Television's stations. Its launch was announced on May 8, 2006, when Ion Media Networks, NBCUniversal, Nelvana, Scholastic Media, Classic Media (now DreamWorks Classics which would later be owned by NBCUniversal) and its Big Idea Productions unit announced plans to create Qubo as a multi-platform children's entertainment endeavor that would extend to a weekly programming block on Ion Television as well as NBC and Telemundo, and a video-on-demand service for digital cable providers. Qubo featured content from the programming libraries of each of the partners, though there was an early promise of each company producing a new series for the network each year; most of its programs were targeted at children ages 2 to 11, though its late night programming block "Qubo Night Owl" (which originally featured animated series from Qubo's partners and the Filmation library, but after August 2013 features a mix of animated and live-action series sourced solely from the distribution partners) was aimed at both older teenagers and Gen X adults.

The network debuted on January 8, 2007 (three weeks prior to its parent network's renaming from i to Ion Television). Its initial format was composed of a four-hour block of shows that repeated six times a day, all featuring programming exclusive to the new channel; by 2010, the channel adopted a more traditional schedule featuring a larger array of programs. As a consequence to the pending launch of Qubo, the i secondary feed was replaced on i O&Os with a repeating promo loop in late September 2006. NBCUniversal dropped out of the venture in 2012, with NBC and sister network Telemundo replacing their Qubo blocks with their own E/I-compliant children's lineups programmed by PBS Kids Sprout (now Universal Kids, which is part-owned by NBCUniversal's corporate parent Comcast) that July, relegating Qubo's companion programming block exclusively to Ion Television. Ion Media Networks acquired the stakes of the remaining partners in the channel, which all retained distribution partnerships with Qubo, in 2013. An additional Qubo block would later launch on Ion Plus on September 8, 2020.

Programming on both Qubo Channel and its companion Qubo blocks on NBC, Telemundo, Ion Television, and Ion Plus accounted for all educational and informative (E/I) programming, relieving Ion Media (both its O&O stations and certain Ion affiliates that carry the 24-hour channel) from the responsibility of carrying programs compliant with guidelines dictated by the Children's Television Act on its other subchannel services.

Qubo ceased broadcasting on February 28, 2021 after Ion Media's acquisition by the E. W. Scripps Company and merger with Katz Broadcasting.

===== Ion Plus =====
Ion Plus (originally named "iHealth" prior to its launch and "Ion Life" until July 1, 2019) launched on February 19, 2007, and was originally carried on the third digital subchannel of Ion Television's stations. Under its former format, the network mainly featured health and lifestyle programs, as well as feature films on Sunday mornings and select weeknights (which consist mainly of those its parent network is scheduled to air during the given month as part of the "Ion Television at the Movies" block); some extreme sports programming previously aired on weekend evenings until July 2014. Much of Ion Life's programming consists of Canadian-imported programs, with some limited U.S.-produced programming. The network originally maintained a 24-hour entertainment schedule until 2013, when Ion Life added a limited number of infomercials in mid-morning and midday timeslots. As of July 1, 2019, it was rebranded to Ion Plus, acting as a de facto extension of the main Ion service, featuring all-day marathon scheduling of one series, along with the same scheduling of paid programming.

Ion Plus originally ceased broadcasting over-the-air after Ion Media's acquisition by the E. W. Scripps Company and merger with Katz Broadcasting on February 28, 2021, though the network continued to air as a FAST network through several AVOD streaming services, including Samsung TV Plus, and Vizio WatchFree.

On June 17, 2024, Scripps quietly posted a promotional video to the social media presences of Ion Plus and Defy TV that the latter would be wound down at the end of June (with its A&E Networks library reality programming moving to another unrelated network provisionally known as Dare, launching that day, but which was sold the Defy branding by Scripps shortly before its debut and returned to the air with the same brand and imaging), with Ion Plus returning to over-the-air availability on July 1; MacGyver and Scorpion were added to Ion Plus to augment its schedule as the mainline Ion network adds further sports programming to its schedule.

===== Ion Shop =====
In April 2012, Ion Media Networks launched a new service known as Ion Shop (originally "iShop" prior to November 2012, and "ShopTV" thereafter, both are names used only by the PSIP identifiers on digital television tuners and converter boxes; there was never explicit on-air branding used by the channel itself); some Ion owned-and-operated stations, however, did not begin carrying the network until as late as that November. Carried as a fourth digital subchannel on Ion Television's owned-and-operated stations, it primarily carried informercials; until June 2013, Ion Shop also aired blocks of programming from Ion Life in some morning and late night timeslots.

Ion Shop ceased operations on February 28, 2021.

===== Ion Mystery =====
On February 24, 2022, the Court TV Mystery network was rebranded as Ion Mystery, with the "Ion" brand now more established regarding procedural dramas in general, including Ion Mystery's overall programming, whereas Court TV is more associated with its news division.

===== QVC Over the Air =====
On August 5, 2013, as part of a partnership between QVC and Ion Media Networks to expand the channel's broadcast television coverage, Ion Television began carrying the cable and satellite home shopping network via a fifth digital subchannel on most of its owned-and-operated stations. Although the network maintains a high-definition simulcast feed, QVC is transmitted in standard definition to preserve channel bandwidth to allow the primary Ion network feed to transmit in HD, with the normally letterboxed SD feed squeezed to full-screen to fit 4:3 television sets (preventing windowboxing of the subchannel on 16:9 sets). QVC is also broadcast on digital subchannels of low-powered television stations (mainly those not owned by Ion Media Networks) in selected areas, including in some areas where an Ion station also carries it. The channel's broadcast service is branded as "QVC Over the Air", with an accompanying on-screen bug appearing on the lower right corner of the screen during the network's programming; the service can be differentiated from the cable network due to the use of a different toll-free number and QR code on-screen to account for any sales made from shoppers through the over the air version of the network. Some Ion-affiliated and owned stations have declined to carry QVC's programming because of other partnerships between QVC and other broadcasters, along with other spectrum agreements to carry other stations and networks; this is also the case with HSN in the next section. The partnership remains in effect in many markets under Scripps ownership and Inyo affiliations, though some stations ended distribution of the network after February 2021 in favor of the Katz networks.

===== Home Shopping Network =====
On November 18, 2013, Ion Television began carrying the Home Shopping Network via a sixth digital subchannel on most of its owned-and-operated stations, as part of a partnership with Ion Media Networks (both once controlled by Lowell "Bud" Paxson) to expand the channel's broadcast coverage. Although it has a high definition simulcast feed, HSN is transmitted by Ion stations in standard definition, due to the same digital multiplexing limitations that prevent QVC from being carried in 16:9 SD or HD. HSN has been widely available over-the-air throughout the United States since its inception – through stations that the network had owned prior to the 1998 reorganization of its Silver King Broadcasting group into USA Broadcasting (some of which were converted into general entertainment independent outlets, and were later sold to Univision Communications to form the charter stations of the present-day UniMás network), and had been mainly available on low-power television stations immediately prior to its subchannel-leasing agreement with Ion; HSN is carried on low-power stations in some markets where an Ion station also carries the network, though HSN's programming is exclusive to an existing affiliate in a few areas where both networks are present (such as Atlanta, where WPXA-TV formerly simulcast Telemundo affiliate WKTB-CD on its DT6 subchannel under a time-leasing arrangement until the sale of that station to Gray Television and its move to WANF's spectrum, and W13DQ-D carries HSN). Some Ion-affiliated stations decline to carry HSN's programming, and some Ion Media-owned stations are unable to carry that network due to affiliation agreements between HSN and other broadcasters that existed prior to the Ion deal. The partnership remains in effect in many markets under Scripps ownership and Inyo affiliations, though some stations ended distribution of the network after February 2021 in favor of the Katz networks.

== See also ==
- PBS
- CBS
- NBC
- American Broadcasting Company
- Fox Broadcasting Company
- The CW
