= WFAW (AM) =

Radio station in Fort Atkinson, Wisconsin

- Fort Atkinson, Wisconsin; United States
- Broadcast area: Jefferson County; Janesville; Beloit
- Frequency: 940 kHz
- Branding: Rock 96.1/101.1

Programming
- Format: Classic rock
- Affiliations: Westwood One

Ownership
- Owner: Magnum Media; (Magnum Communications, Inc.)
- Sister stations: WSJY, WKCH

History
- First air date: January 24, 1963
- Call sign meaning: Fort Atkinson, Wisconsin

Technical information
- Licensing authority: FCC
- Facility ID: 24446
- Class: B
- Power: 500 watts (day); 550 watts (night)
- Transmitter coordinates: 42°54′24.00″N 88°45′6.00″W
- Translators: WSJY-HD2: 96.1 W241BQ (Watertown); 101.1 W266DX (Janesville)
- Repeater: (107.3-2) WSJY-HD2 (Fort Atkinson)

Links
- Public license information: Public file; LMS
- Webcast: Listen live
- Website: rockwfaw.com

WFAW (940 AM) is a commercial radio station licensed to Fort Atkinson, Wisconsin, United States, serving the Jefferson County, Janesville and Beloit areas. The station is owned by Magnum Media, through licensee Magnum Communications, Inc., and features programming from Westwood One. WFAW has a classic rock format.

WFAW's transmitter is sited off of Finlay Road at Jacobson Lane in Hebron. Programming is also heard on two FM translators at 96.1 MHz in Watertown and at 101.1 in Janesville.

== History ==
WFAW signed on the air on November 24, 1963. For several decades, it was a daytimer, required to go off the air at night. In its early years, WFAW was a middle of the road (MOR) station, playing popular adult music with news and sports. In the 1970s, it aired a Top 40 format and was an affiliate of the ABC Contemporary Network.

In the early 1980s, WFAW played country music and later adult contemporary. As music listening moved from AM stations to the FM dial, the station added more talk shows and by the early 2000s had shifted to a talk radio format.

On October 5, 2020, WFAW changed from talk to oldies. It played hits of the 1960s, 1970s and 1980s, branded as "Oldies 940". In December 2021, WFAW added an FM translator licensed to Janesville on 101.1 FM broadcasting from a tower near Edgerton which also provides rimshot coverage to the Madison area.

On August 22, 2022, WFAW changed its format to classic rock, dropping the remainder of local sports and the majority of local news programing. The new format was branded as "Rock 96.1/101.1". The Janesville translator at 101.1 FM was supplemented by a second translator, W241BQ 96.1 FM in Watertown, giving WFAW FM coverage in most of the southern and eastern portions of the Madison market as well as the Janesville-Beloit area.

WFAW now competes with fellow rock outlet WWHG in the Janesville/Beloit area as well as Madison and Milwaukee based rock outlets. WFAW also compliments identically branded Portage based rock station WAUN which similarly is paired with two FM translators. WAUN with its AM and two FM frequencies cover the northern side of the Madison market as well as the Wisconsin Dells sub-market effectively giving Magnum's rock format coverage of the entire Madison area.
