= W47CK =

Television station in Shallotte, North Carolina (1999–2020)

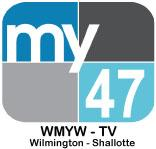
- Shallotte–Wilmington, North Carolina; United States
- City: Shallotte, North Carolina
- Channels: Analog: 47 (UHF)
- Branding: WMYW My 47

Programming
- Affiliations: Independent (via WGGS-TV, 1999–2003); Dark (2003–2006); MyNetworkTV (2006–2020)

Ownership
- Owner: Carolina Christian Broadcasting, Inc. (1999–2006); Paradigm Broadcasting Group (2006–2011); WBHQ Columbia, LLC (2011–2020)
- Sister stations: WKTC

History
- Founded: April 15, 1994
- First air date: October 7, 1999
- Last air date: December 11, 2020 (license canceled)
- Former call signs: W45BK (October–December 1999)
- Former channel numbers: 45 (UHF, October–December 1999)
- Call sign meaning: Fictional call sign standing for MyNetworkTV Wilmington; W47CK was randomly assigned

Technical information
- Licensing authority: FCC
- Facility ID: 9069
- Class: TX
- ERP: 13 kW
- HAAT: 150 m (492 ft)
- Transmitter coordinates: 34°02′36″N 78°19′55″W

Links
- Public license information: Public file; LMS

W47CK (channel 47) was a low-power television station licensed to Shallotte, North Carolina, United States, which served the Wilmington area as an affiliate of MyNetworkTV. Owned by Timothy McIver, the station maintained a transmitter on Royal Oak Road in Lockwoods Folly Township, northwest of Supply, North Carolina.

== Background ==
W47CK used the fictional call sign "WMYW" in its branding, which was unrecognized by the Federal Communications Commission (FCC). It was one of two television stations in Wilmington which continued to operate analog signals after the market's voluntary digital switchover on September 8, 2008, and continued to broadcast in the same format since the June 12, 2009, national transition date.

W47CK did not apply for digital facilities nor to perform a "flash-cut" to digital with the FCC. Low-power television stations like W47CK were not initially required to switch to digital in the United States though two other low-power outlets (then-CBS affiliate and now independent station WILM-LD and former Trinity Broadcasting Network station W51CW) did make an early switch in Wilmington on the voluntary date. Low-power television stations had to convert to digital on or before July 13, 2021.

For a period of time, WITN-DT2 from Washington, North Carolina, could be seen on Time Warner Cable digital channel 931 in the greater Wilmington area since W47CK was technically ineligible for mandatory carriage on cable providers due to its low-power status. As a result, the clearance allowed WITN-DT2 to unofficially serve as Wilmington's MyNetworkTV outlet since, at that time, the network had no affiliate in the area. Eventually, Time Warner Cable (now Spectrum) would pick up W47CK on its digital tier and subsequently dropped WITN-DT2 from the lineup.

On December 11, 2020, the FCC canceled W47CK's license for failing to submit a license renewal application.
