= WRBJ-FM =

- Brandon, Mississippi; United States
- Broadcast area: Jackson, Mississippi
- Frequency: 97.7 MHz
- Branding: 97-7

Programming
- Language: English
- Format: Urban contemporary

Ownership
- Owner: Roberts Broadcasting; (Roberts Radio Broadcasting, LLC)

History
- First air date: 1975
- Former call signs: WRJH (1974–2007)
- Call sign meaning: "Roberts Broadcasting of Jackson"

Technical information
- Licensing authority: FCC
- Facility ID: 73959
- Class: A
- ERP: 6,000 watts
- HAAT: 100 meters (330 ft)
- Transmitter coordinates: 32°10′31.5″N 89°56′10.3″W

Links
- Public license information: Public file; LMS
- Webcast: Listen live
- Website: thebeatofthecapital.com

WRBJ-FM (97.7 MHz) is an urban contemporary radio station licensed to Brandon, Mississippi, United States, serving the Jackson area. It is the only remaining broadcast property whose license continues to be owned and operated by Roberts Broadcasting, a moribund company that sold all of its remaining television station assets to the Trinity Broadcasting Network and Ion Television in 2013 and 2014 after filing for Chapter 11 bankruptcy in 2011.

The station's studio facilities are located at The Roberts Building along State Street in Jackson, just two blocks north of the Mississippi State Capitol building, and its transmitter tower is south of Brandon.

== History ==
=== 20th century ===
The station was first licensed January 28, 1975, as WRJH. It was originally paired with WRKN (970 AM) in Brandon, Mississippi; the WRJH call sign initially stood for "Roy and June Harris", the original owners. Both stations were promoted as "Gospel 97" for many decades. The call sign also came to mean other things as well ("We're Raising Jesus Higher"). After Harris died, June led the radio station for over 10 years as president/CEO. She then sold the station to On Top Communications, which purchased it for $1.6 million. The WRJH call sign took on a different meaning ("We are Jackson's Hot 97.7").

On Top went bankrupt in 2005; most of its stations either switched formats or went silent. WRJH was sold at a bankruptcy auction. At that time, Roberts Broadcasting acquired WRJH for $1.95 million, moved its studios to the facilities of its television station WRBJ (channel 34), and changed the call sign to WRBJ-FM.

WRBJ's playlist mainly consists of hip hop and R&B. Unlike most stations, this one plays smoother music during the workday time frame while it plays newer music later afternoons into the early evening.

=== 21st century ===
In response to the Don Imus controversy, WRBJ's owner, Roberts Broadcasting, took a stand on excessively violent and derogatory hip hop lyrical content. Jesse Jackson and Al Sharpton have long taken a stand against, and hip-hop mogul Russell Simmons began to stand up against it, calling on people to accept social responsibility.

In April 2007, inspired by the move, Roberts Broadcasting, after reviewing playlists for content, decided to create a policy to ban the station from playing music that glorifies violence and degrades women. The purpose was to take a stand against racism, self-racism with Blacks using the N-word against each other, and promote pride in the African American community by fighting against the oppressive media. While the revamping of the playlist may not be noticeable to listeners, the owner said that any songs on WRBJ-FM containing content considered offensive (other than censored language) will be removed. And it may go on to drop syndication rights to the Russ Parr Morning Show as well, claiming that the morning jock is a borderline shock jock. This was the first time a radio station owner had done this since Clear Channel banned certain songs from airplay in response to September 11 terrorist attacks.

On March 17, 2008, WRBJ-FM rebranded the station as "97-7 (WRBJ)", and began playing fewer hip-hop songs and more R&B music.
