= WKCH =

- Whitewater, Wisconsin; United States
- Broadcast area: Whitewater, Wisconsin; Fort Atkinson, Wisconsin; Jefferson County, Wisconsin
- Frequency: 106.5 MHz
- Branding: Klassic Country 106.5/94.7

Programming
- Format: Classic country
- Affiliations: Westwood One

Ownership
- Owner: Magnum Media; (Magnum Communications, Inc.)
- Sister stations: WFAW, WSJY

History
- First air date: 1997
- Former call signs: WRLM (5/1993-9/1993); WISQ (1993–1996)
- Call sign meaning: Wisconsin's Koolest Classic Hits (former format)

Technical information
- Licensing authority: FCC
- Facility ID: 59406
- Class: A
- ERP: 6,000 watts
- HAAT: 61 meters (200 ft)
- Transmitter coordinates: 42°54′20.00″N 88°45′5.00″W
- Repeater: 107.3-3 WSJY-HD3 (Fort Atkinson)

Links
- Public license information: Public file; LMS
- Webcast: Listen Live
- Website: wkchradio.com

WKCH (106.5 FM, "Klassic Country 106.5/94.7") is a radio station broadcasting a classic country music format. Licensed to Whitewater, Wisconsin, United States, the station serves Whitewater, Fort Atkinson and surrounding communities. In addition to country, WKCH also broadcasts local area high school sports and NASCAR. WKCH had previously broadcast UW-Whitewater Warhawks athletics, but ended that agreement following the 2021-2022 academic year. WKCH's studios are located in Fort Atkinson, alongside sister stations WFAW and WSJY.

The station is currently owned by Magnum Media, through licensee Magnum Communications, Inc.

As of 2024, WKCH is available on the HD-3 signal of sister station WSJY; this affords the station coverage across the Madison area.

== History ==
The station was assigned the call letters WRLM on May 28, 1993. On September 1, 1993, the station changed its call sign to WISQ. Then, on June 14, 1996, its call letters were changed to WKCH.

In the 1990s, the station simulcasted sister station WFAW until 1999 when it began running oldies music without imaging. It finally became "Kool FM K-106" by the end of 1999 then later reimaged to its current moniker "KOOL 106.5". On March 3, 2016, WKCH shifted its format from oldies to classic hits.

On November 9, 2020, WKCH changed their format from classic hits to country, branded as Kicks 106.5".

On September 9, 2024, WKCH changed their format from country to classic country, branded as "Klassic Country 106.5/94.7".
