= WRDB =

- Reedsburg, Wisconsin; United States
- Broadcast area: Sauk County, Wisconsin
- Frequency: 1400 kHz
- Branding: 97.3 WRDB

Programming
- Language: English
- Format: Oldies; Sports radio
- Affiliations: ESPN Radio

Ownership
- Owner: Magnum Communications, Inc.
- Sister stations: WBKY, WBOO, WDLS, WNFM, WNNO-FM

History
- First air date: 1953
- Call sign meaning: Reedsburg

Technical information
- Licensing authority: FCC
- Facility ID: 59233
- Class: C
- Power: 1,000 watts (day); 640 watts (night)
- Transmitter coordinates: 43°32′30″N 90°2′5″W
- Translator: 97.3 W247CY (Baraboo)

Links
- Public license information: Public file; LMS
- Webcast: Listen live
- Website: www.973wrdb.com

WRDB (1400 AM) is a radio station in Reedsburg, Wisconsin, the station transmits 1,000 watts during the daytime and 640 watts during the nighttime from a tower located just west of Reedsburg. WRDB currently airs a mixture of oldies and sports radio– including Reedsburg Beavers high school football, boys and girls basketball, and baseball, as well as Milwaukee Brewers baseball, ESPN Sunday Night Baseball and Wisconsin Badgers football, basketball and hockey. WRDB is the primary sports station in the Reedsburg and Wisconsin Dells area.

== History ==
WRDB first signed on the air in 1953. Initially operating with 250 watts of power, WRDB functioned as a "full-service" station, providing a mix of local news, agricultural reports, and popular music. In 1967, the station expanded its local presence by launching an FM sister station, WRDB-FM (104.9), which later became WNFM.

In late 2007, the station was acquired by Magnum Communications (Magnum Media), a family-owned broadcaster led by Dave Magnum. Longtime local broadcaster Thomas "Tommy Lee" Bychinski, who joined the station in 1973, became a defining voice of the station for over five decades before his passing in late 2025.

== Previous logo ==
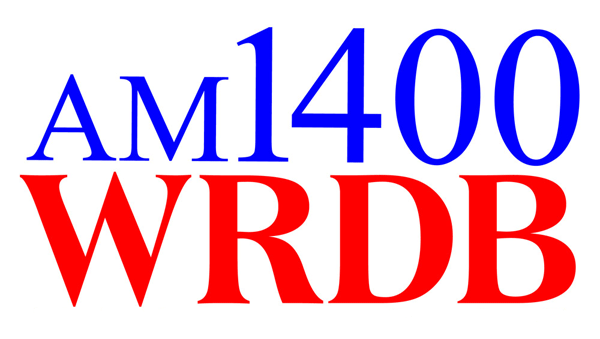
