= WAUN (AM) =

Radio station in Portage, Wisconsin

- Portage, Wisconsin; United States
- Broadcast area: Wisconsin Dells; Madison
- Frequency: 1350 kHz
- Branding: WAUNa Rock

Programming
- Format: Classic rock
- Affiliations: Premiere Networks

Ownership
- Owner: Magnum Broadcasting; (Magnum Communications, Inc.)
- Sister stations: WDDC, WNFM, WRDB, WNNO-FM, WDLS, WBOO

History
- First air date: July 31, 1952 (as WPDR)
- Former call signs: WPDR (1952–2021); WEZY (2021–2022)
- Call sign meaning: Sounds like "Wau-nah", as in "Wanna Rock?"

Technical information
- Licensing authority: FCC
- Facility ID: 35516
- Class: D
- Power: 1,000 watts day; 41 watts night
- Transmitter coordinates: 43°31′42.00″N 89°26′1.00″W
- Translators: 96.9 W245DQ (Waunakee); 102.1 W271DQ (Baraboo)

Links
- Public license information: Public file; LMS
- Webcast: Listen live
- Website: rockwaun.com

WAUN (1350 kHz) is an AM radio station broadcasting a classic rock format. Known as WPDR for nearly 70 years, the station previously held a news/talk format. Before that, WPDR played oldies and also played country music for many years. Licensed to Portage, Wisconsin, United States, the station is currently owned by Magnum Broadcasting. Co-owned WDDC, formerly WPDR-FM, is located at 100.1 MHz. WAUN is simulcast on FM via two translator stations, 102.1 in Baraboo which covers the majority of the Dells/Baraboo and Portage areas from a transmitter on the Baraboo Range as well as 96.9 in DeForest which covers the northern Madison area.

== History ==
On March 8, 1951, the Portage Broadcasting Company, associated with the Portage Daily Register, applied for a new radio station in Portage, to broadcast during daylight hours with 1,000 watts on 1350 kHz. After merging with a competing applicant, the Federal Communications Commission (FCC) granted the application on February 13, 1952, and the new station took the call letters WPDR, for the newspaper. Ground was broken on the station's facilities south of town that May, and the first broadcast went out on the morning of July 31, 1952.

Comstock Publishing—which sold off the Register in 1957—owned WPDR for the first 22 years of its existence and also grew it during that time. In 1962, the FCC approved an increase in power to 5,000 watts. An FM companion station, WPDR-FM 100.1, was authorized in 1966. Comstock ownership ended with the sale of WPDR/WPDR-FM in 1974 to Edward Kramer of Waupaca. Several programming changes followed, including the addition of a local tradio show, an hour-long farm program, and ABC Entertainment news. In 1977, the FM station became WDDC and adopted a separate format.

Kramer ownership of WPDR and WDDC lasted nearly 29 years; when he opted to retire in 2004 after nearly 50 years in radio, he sold the pair to Zoe Communications of Shell Lake in 2003. Zoe then sold both properties to Magnum in 2010.

On October 10, 2022, WEZY replaced its oldies programming with a mainstream rock format, branded "WAUNa Rock" (pronounced "Wau-nah", as in "Wanna Rock"). The station announced its intention to take on the WAUN call sign, with WEZY being transferred to Chippewa Falls station WCFW; the call changes took place on November 9. This new format pairs with Fort Atkinson licensed WFAW, an identically programmed and branded AM station that also has two FM translators that target the southern portion of the Madison market as well as the Janesville-Beloit submarket effectively giving Magnum full Madison market coverage with its new rock format. This is an arrangement similar to Magnum's country strategy in the neighboring Milwaukee market with its WMBZ and WVTY pairing.
