= WSJY =

- Fort Atkinson, Wisconsin; United States
- Broadcast area: Janesville; Beloit; Madison
- Frequency: 107.3 MHz (HD Radio)
- Branding: 107.3 WSJY

Programming
- Format: Adult contemporary
- Subchannels: HD2: WFAW simulcast (Classic rock); HD3: WKCH simulcast (Classic country); HD4: WBKY simulcast (Country music)

Ownership
- Owner: Magnum Media; (Magnum Communications, Inc.)
- Sister stations: WFAW; WKCH

History
- First air date: 1959; 67 years ago (as WFAW-FM)
- Former call signs: WFAW-FM (1959–1981)
- Call sign meaning: "Joy" (from a previous format)

Technical information
- Licensing authority: FCC
- Facility ID: 24442
- Class: B
- ERP: 26,000 watts
- HAAT: 206 meters (676 ft)
- Transmitter coordinates: 42°48′2.00″N 89°3′16.00″W
- Translators: HD3: 94.7 W234DR (Beloit); HD2: 96.1 W241BQ (Watertown); HD4: 99.5 W258CM (Madison)

Links
- Public license information: Public file; LMS
- Webcast: Listen Live
- Website: 1073wsjy.com

WSJY (107.3 FM) is a commercial radio station licensed to Fort Atkinson, Wisconsin, and serving a section of southern Wisconsin, including Janesville, Beloit and Madison, along with part of Northern Illinois. WSJY airs an adult contemporary radio format, switching to Christmas music for much of November and December. It is owned by the Magnum Media Group, through licensee Magnum Communications, Inc.

WSJY is a Class B FM station, with an effective radiated power of 26,000 watts. The transmitter is on Korean War Veterans Highway in Fulton. It also operates an FM translator relaying the station's main signal, 94.7 W234DR in Beloit. WSJY broadcasts using HD Radio technology. Its HD2 digital subchannel simulcasts the classic rock format carried by sister station WFAW (940 AM) and feeds the Watertown translator of that station.

== History ==
Logo as "Lite 107.3"

The station signed on the air in 1959 as WFAW-FM, sister station to WFAW (940 AM). In the 1950s and 1960s, the two stations mostly simulcast their programming. WFAW-FM was limited in its power, not quite at 3,000 watts. It only covered Fort Atkinson and some adjacent communities.

In the 1970s, WFAW-FM switched to automated beautiful music, playing quarter hour sweeps of soft instrumental cover versions of popular adult hits, with some Broadway and Hollywood show tunes.

On July 6, 1981, WFAW-FM changed its call sign to the current WSJY. WSJY had an easy listening format, with the "JY" in the call sign referring to the station's moniker, "Joy 107".

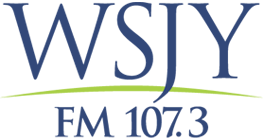
Previous logo for WSJY

In the 1990s, as the easy listening audience was aging, WSJY added more vocals to its playlist. It eventually transitioned to a soft adult contemporary sound, largely eliminating the instrumentals. In the 2000s, the tempo picked up and the station made the segue to mainstream adult contemporary music.

By the late 2000s, WSJY's rotation had come to encompass a variety of mainstream adult contemporary and soft rock popular music, including artists such as Mariah Carey, The Eagles, Phil Collins, Fleetwood Mac, Whitney Houston, Billy Joel, Martina McBride, Elton John, Madonna, and Rob Thomas.

== WSJY-HD4 ==
In April 2024, WSJY's HD4 subchannel switched from a simulcast of WSJY's adult contemporary format to a simulcast of country-formatted WBKY 95.9 FM Stoughton. WSJY-HD4 now feeds FM translator W258CM 99.5 FM Madison (which switched from WSJY's adult contemporary format).
