= WTMB =

- Tomah, Wisconsin; United States
- Broadcast area: La Crosse, Wisconsin
- Frequency: 94.5 MHz
- Branding: 94.5 Classic Rock

Programming
- Format: Classic rock
- Affiliations: ABC Radio; Jones Radio Network; Premiere Radio Networks

Ownership
- Owner: Magnum Radio, Inc.
- Sister stations: WBOG, WLXR

History
- First air date: March 23, 1989 (as WZFR)
- Former call signs: WZFR (1989–1994); WUSK (1994–1997); WBOG (1997–2003)

Technical information
- Licensing authority: FCC
- Facility ID: 30305
- Class: C3
- ERP: 8,300 watts
- HAAT: 172 m (564 ft)
- Transmitter coordinates: 43°53′56.00″N 90°29′23.00″W

Links
- Public license information: Public file; LMS
- Webcast: Listen Live
- Website: classicrockwtmb.com

WTMB (94.5 FM) is a radio station broadcasting a Classic rock format. Previous formats for the station included new age as WZFR, country as WUSK, and oldies as WBOG. Licensed to Tomah, Wisconsin, United States, the station serves the La Crosse area. The station is currently owned by Magnum Radio, Inc. and features programming from ABC Radio, Jones Radio Network and Premiere Radio Networks.

== History ==
The station went on the air as WZFR on March 23, 1989. On December 20, 1994, the station changed its call sign to WUSK, then on February 3, 1997, to WBOG, and finally on November 19, 2003, to the current WTMB.
