= Washington State Parkinson Disease Registry =

Disease registry in Washington, US

The Washington State Parkinson Disease Registry (WPDR) was created in May 2007 to facilitate Parkinson disease research by maintaining a list of people in Washington state, who have Parkinson disease, and are interested in Parkinson disease research. Parkinson disease researchers request the WPDR notify its members of potential research opportunities. The WPDR executive board then evaluates the requesting researcher's study protocol and notifies suitable registry members of the research opportunity.

The intent of the registry is to increase membership in high quality Parkinson disease research studies, while reducing the time and money necessary to recruit interested subjects.

== Sponsorship ==
The Washington State Parkinson Disease Registry is sponsored by the Washington State Department of Health, a group of Washington state physicians at the University of Washington Department of Neurology and the American Parkinson Disease Association Northwest Chapter.
