= WRBJ-TV =

Television station in Magee, Mississippi

- Magee–Jackson–Hattiesburg–; Meridian, Mississippi; United States
- City: Magee, Mississippi
- Channels: Digital: 34 (UHF); Virtual: 34

Programming
- Affiliations: 34.1: TBN; for others, see § Subchannels

Ownership
- Owner: Trinity Broadcasting Network; (Trinity Broadcasting of Texas, Inc.)

History
- Founded: January 2006
- First air date: January 5, 2006 (on Time Warner Cable); February 8, 2006 (over the air)
- Former channel numbers: Analog: 34 (UHF, 2006–2009)
- Former affiliations: UPN (January–September 2006); The CW (2006–2013)
- Call sign meaning: Roberts Broadcasting of Jackson (reference to former owner)

Technical information
- Licensing authority: FCC
- Facility ID: 136749
- ERP: 968 kW
- HAAT: 374.6 m (1,229 ft)
- Transmitter coordinates: 32°7′19″N 89°32′52″W

Links
- Public license information: Public file; LMS
- Website: www.tbn.org

WRBJ-TV (channel 34) is a religious television station licensed to Magee, Mississippi, United States, serving the Jackson, Hattiesburg and Meridian television markets. The station is owned by the Trinity Broadcasting Network. WRBJ-TV's transmitter is located near Raleigh, Mississippi, in the Bienville National Forest.

== History ==
WRBJ began broadcasting as a UPN affiliate via Time Warner Cable on January 5, 2006, and over-the-air broadcasting began on February 8. On March 21, 2006, it was announced that WRBJ would join the new CW Television Network, and on September 18, WRBJ became a CW affiliate. The station was founded by St. Louis–based Roberts Broadcasting.

The call letters WRBJ were assigned briefly to WDBT radio (now WFOR) in Hattiesburg, the first radio station in Mississippi. In September 2006, the WRBJ call sign returned to radio when Roberts Broadcasting bought out Jackson-market urban radio station WRJH (97.7 FM) and renamed it WRBJ-FM.

On March 31, 2011, WRBJ's license was initially canceled by the Federal Communications Commission (FCC) for failure to file for either a license to cover or an extension of its digital construction permit (the license for sister station WZRB in Columbia, South Carolina, was initially cancelled for the same reasons two days earlier). However, Roberts Broadcasting filed an appeal, stating that the licenses to cover were improperly filed upon the digital transition. The FCC agreed, and reinstated the licenses of the two stations on April 19. Roberts had to file for new licenses to cover.

On October 22, 2012, Roberts announced that it had sold WRBJ to the Trinity Broadcasting Network (TBN). The Christian broadcaster was previously available in the Jackson area on low-powered WJKO-LP, which was later sold to the Daystar Television Network. The sale was approved by a bankruptcy court on January 17, 2013; the FCC approved the sale six days later, and TBN officially took over operational control of WRBJ five months later, on May 24, 2013. CW network programming would not be seen in the Jackson area until WJTV picked up The CW on its second digital subchannel in October 2013. On July 17, 2013, the station's call sign was modified with the addition of a "-TV" suffix.

== Subchannels ==
The station's signal is multiplexed:

Subchannels of WRBJ-TV
Subchannel	Res.	Short name	Programming
34.1	720p	TBN HD	TBN
34.2	720p	TVDEALS	Infomercials
34.3	480i	Inspire	TBN Inspire
34.4	480i	ONTV4U	OnTV4U (infomercials) (4:3)
34.5	480i	POSITIV	Positiv

TBN-owned full-power stations permanently ceased analog transmissions on April 16, 2009.
