= WBOG =

Radio station in Tomah, Wisconsin

- Tomah, Wisconsin; United States
- Broadcast area: Sparta, Wisconsin
- Frequency: 1460 kHz
- Branding: BOG Country

Programming
- Format: Classic country
- Affiliations: Westwood One

Ownership
- Owner: Magnum Radio

History
- First air date: April 19, 1959 (as WTMB)
- Former call signs: WTMB (1959–2003)

Technical information
- Licensing authority: FCC
- Facility ID: 52533
- Class: D
- Power: 1,000 watts (day); 42 watts (night)
- Transmitter coordinates: 43°58′7″N 90°30′50″W
- Translator: 101.3 W267CO (Sparta)

Links
- Public license information: Public file; LMS
- Webcast: Listen Live
- Website: bogcountry.com

WBOG (1460 AM) is a radio station broadcasting a classic-based country music format. It is licensed to Tomah, Wisconsin, United States, and is owned by Magnum Radio. The station features programming from Westwood One.

== 2011 name change ==
Logo under previous format

In May 2011, WBOG's slogan was changed to "Kool Gold 1460", using the branding of the Kool Gold satellite service heard on WBOG. On January 7, 2020, the station flipped formats to classic country.
