= WNNO-FM =

Radio station in Wisconsin Dells, Wisconsin

Coordinates: 43.640°N 89.721°W

- Wisconsin Dells, Wisconsin; United States
- Broadcast area: Baraboo, Wisconsin
- Frequency: 106.9 MHz
- Branding: Mix 106.9

Programming
- Format: Top 40 (CHR)
- Affiliations: Compass Media Networks; Premiere Networks

Ownership
- Owner: Magnum Communications, Inc.

History
- First air date: 1974 (at 107.1)
- Former call signs: WQRH (1973)
- Former frequencies: 107.1 MHz (1974–1993)
- Call sign meaning: Former simulcast of WNNO-AM, whose original frequency was 990 AM, or Nine Nine Oh

Technical information
- Licensing authority: FCC
- Facility ID: 2806
- Class: A
- ERP: 6,000 watts
- HAAT: 98 meters

Links
- Public license information: Public file; LMS
- Webcast: Listen Live
- Website: mix106wnno.com

WNNO-FM (106.9 MHz, "Mix 106.9") is a Top 40 music formatted radio station. WNNO is a sister station to WDLS AM 900. Its station is located in Wisconsin Dells and Lake Delton, and its signal can be reached out to Portage, Poynette, Baraboo, Lyndon Station, and Adams-Friendship, as well as the northern tier of the Madison Metro area.

== History ==
The construction permit for this station was obtained as WQRH in February 1973. Owned by Obed S. Borgen, it and its sister station WWDA AM 990 were sold to the Taylor Electric Company late in the year; the call letters were changed to WNNO-AM-FM before the FM signed on. After having been established in a trailer located at the transmitter site along Highway 23, about three miles outside of Wisconsin Dells—where listeners passing by would occasionally honk their horns, to which the on-air jocks would acknowledge the "neighbors driving by"—new studios were built at 721 Superior Street in downtown Wisconsin Dells, where they would stay for the next 28 years. John Taylor was the station GM, and the WNNO-FM format was Top 40 hits. The station simulcast with WNNO AM. The station was sold to Voss Radio, Inc. in 1977 and continued to simulcast Top 40 hits with WNNO-AM, which had now changed frequency to AM 900. The format changed to “Memory Music” between late 1983 and 1985; Chicago Cubs games were also broadcast during this period.

Voss sold the station to Armada Broadcasting in 1985, and the format was changed back to simulcasting Top 40 hits. Mutual news was dropped and the emphasis was on more local events. One of the principal owners of Armada is the nephew of radio legend Gary Owens, and Gary's liners for WNNO could be heard on-air at this time.

During the early- to mid-1990s, WNNO-FM was a Top-40 station, while WNNO AM simulcast WNNO-FM or was off the air. WNNO and WNNO-FM had studios together on Superior Street in Wisconsin Dells and would usually be on the air from 6AM-midnight.

In the late 1990s WNNO-AM-FM were purchased by Magnum Radio Group and studios were moved to Church Street in Wisconsin Dells. By this time, WNNO AM had become a simulcast of WIBU/1240 Poynette/Portage, which aired Jones Radio Networks' Classic Hit Country format at the time. The calls of WNNO AM were changed to WDLS, which is now a classic country station; concurrently, WNNO-FM became CHR under the name "Mix 106", also using programming from Jones Radio Networks (Now Dial Global).

== See also ==
- WDLS (AM 900)
