= WKBH =

WKBH may refer to:

- WKBH (AM), a radio station (1570 AM) licensed to Holmen, Wisconsin, United States
- WKBH-FM, a radio station (102.7 FM) licensed to La Crescent, Minnesota, United States
- WLCW, a radio station (100.1 FM) licensed to West Salem, Wisconsin, which held the call sign WKBH-FM from 1997 to 2020
- WFBZ, a radio station (105.5 FM) licensed to Trempealeau, Wisconsin, which held the call sign WKBH-FM from 1986 to 1997
- WIZM (AM) a radio station (1410 AM) licensed to La Crosse, Wisconsin, which held the call sign WKBH from 1926 to 1971
