= MCU (disambiguation) =

MCU most often refers to the Marvel Cinematic Universe, a shared universe of superhero films and TV series developed by Marvel Studios.

MCU may also refer to:

== Arts and entertainment ==
- MCU, Japanese hip-hop/rap artist, formerly of Kick the Can Crew
- Medium close-up, camera direction used in British television scripts
- Major Crimes Unit, in various works of fiction:
  - A part of the Gotham City Police Department in the Batman comics
  - An agency of the Chicago Police Department in the TV series Crime Story
  - An agency of the Baltimore Police Department in the TV series The Wire

== Science and technology ==
=== Computing ===
- Microcontroller unit, a single computer chip designed for embedded applications
- Memory controller unit, the part of a microprocessor responsible for interfacing it with main memory
- Minimum coded unit, the pixel block size of a JPEG computer image
- Modular concept unit, the basic avionics packaging compliant with ARINC Specification 600
- Monte Carlo Universal, a computer software project to simulate particle transport using the Monte Carlo method
- Multi-chip unit, a system that contains the processing units of the VAX 9000 minicomputer
- Multipoint control unit, a device used to bridge videoconferencing connections
- Motor control unit, a motor controller device or group of devices that can coordinate in a predetermined manner the performance of an electric motor.

=== Other uses in science and technology ===
- Milk clotting units, a measure of enzyme activity
- Mitochondrial calcium uniporter, a calcium channel in a human cell's mitochondria
- Moisture cure polyurethane coatings, corrosion-resistant marine and protective coatings

== Organizations ==
=== Universities ===
- Marine Corps University, U.S. Marine Corps military graduate school
- Ming Chuan University, Taipei, Taiwan
- Manila Central University, Caloocan, Philippines
- Marymount California University, Palos Verdes, California, United States
- Mahachulalongkornrajavidyalaya University, a Buddhist university in Thailand with many monastics involved
- Mississippi Christian University, the future name of Mississippi College
- Moscow City University, a public research university located in Moscow, Russia

=== Other organizations ===
- Movement of Unitarian Communists (Movimento dei Comunisti Unitari), an Italian communist party
- Modern Churchpeople's Union, an Anglican liberal theological organisation
- Municipal Credit Union, in New York City
- Marine Credit Union, in La Crosse, Wisconsin

== Other uses ==
- Montluçon – Guéret Airport, France (IATA airport code MCU)
