= La Crosse, Wisconsin =

City and county seat of La Crosse County, Wisconsin

- City
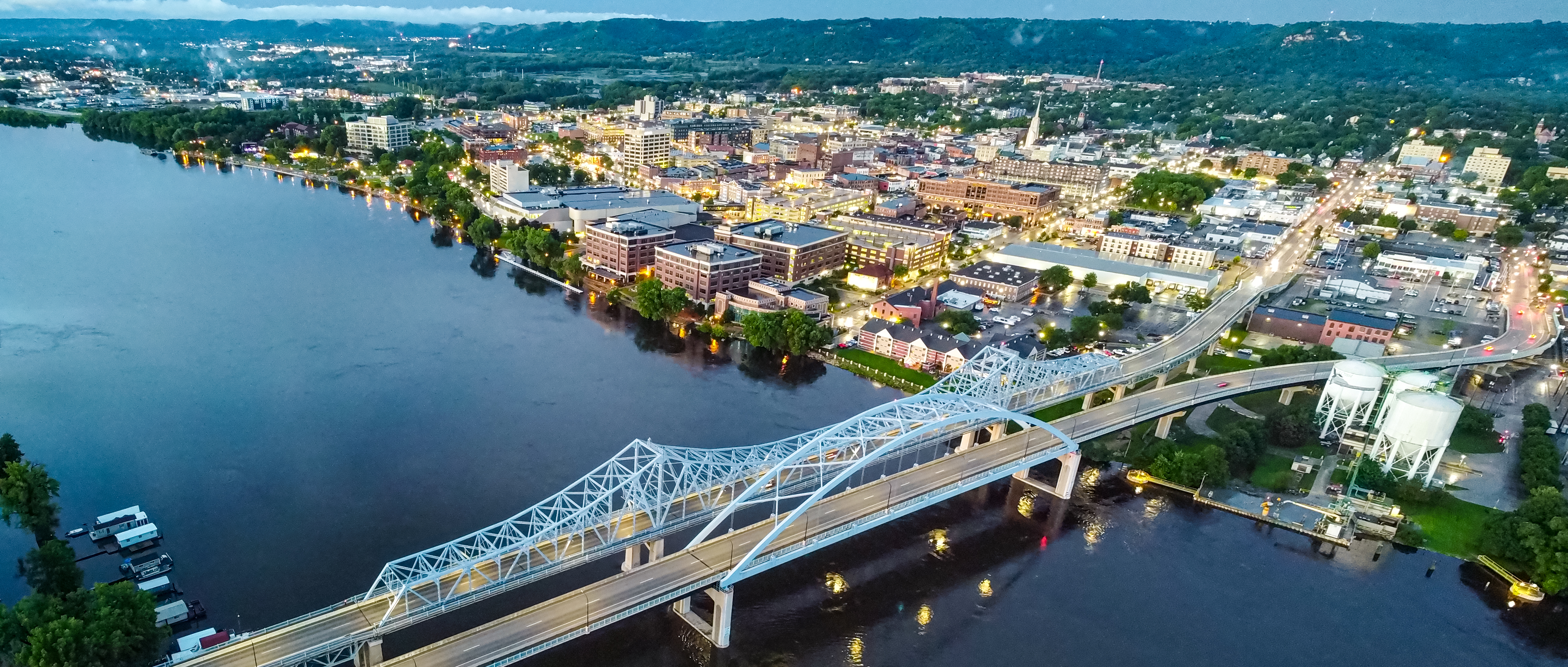
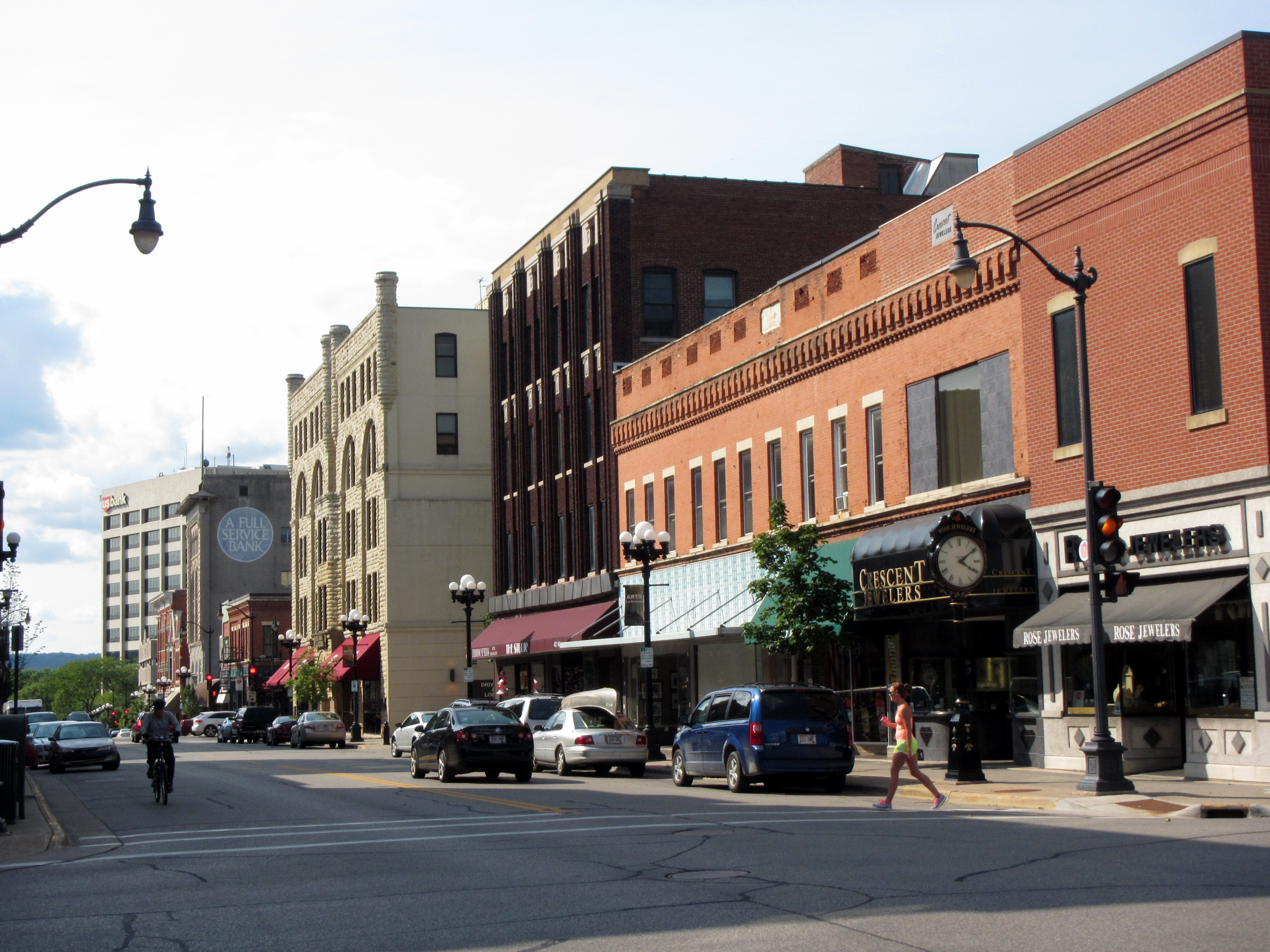
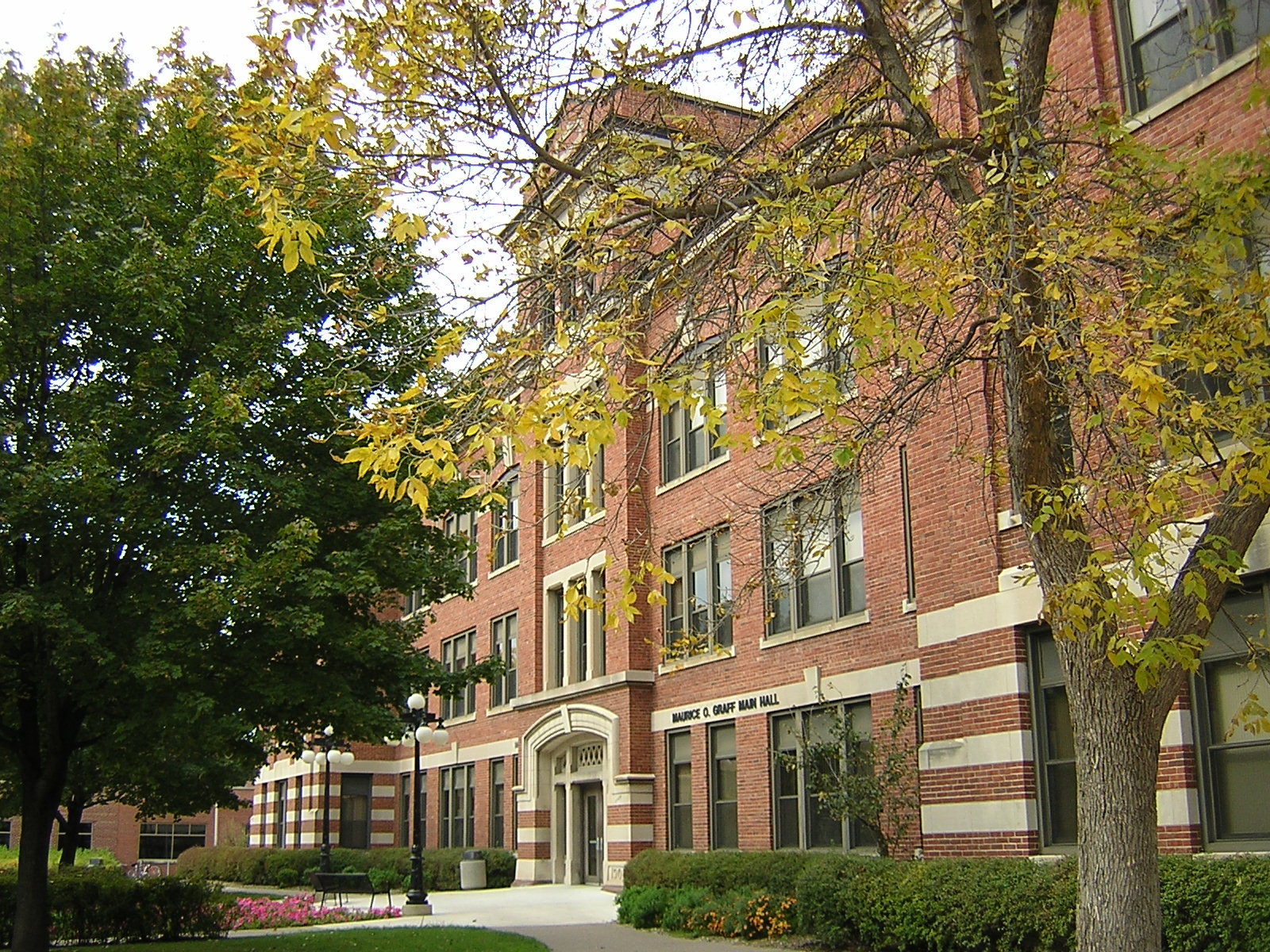
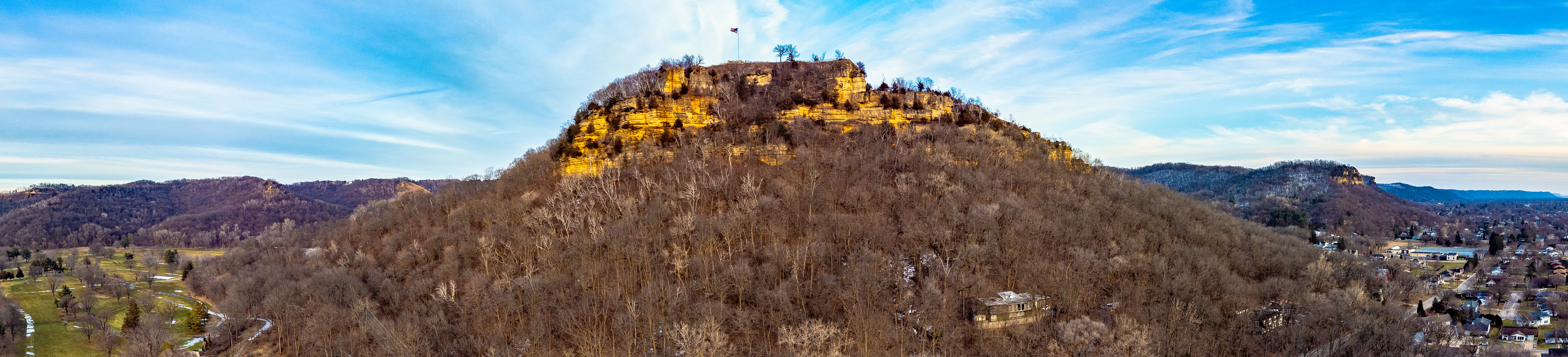
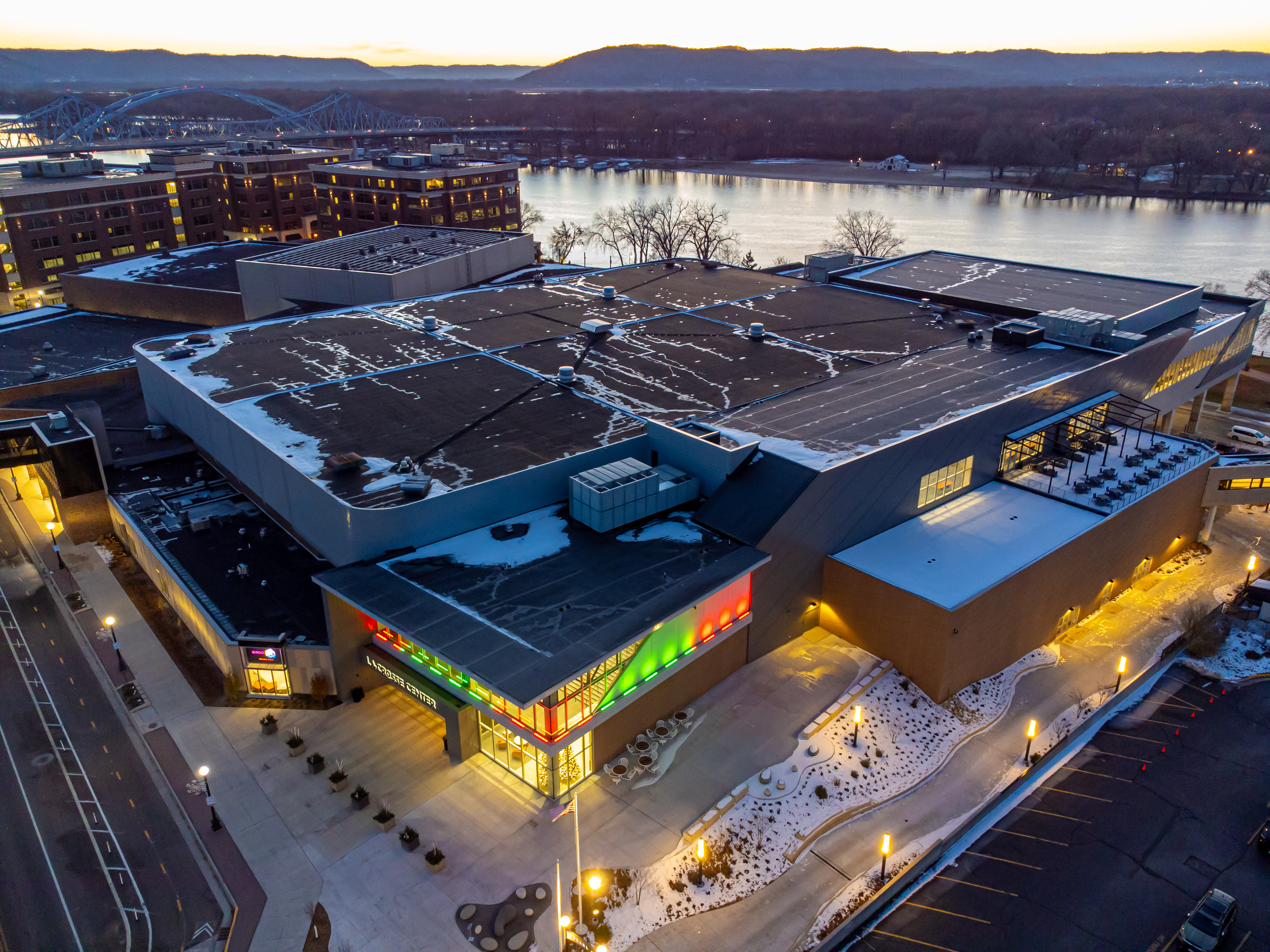
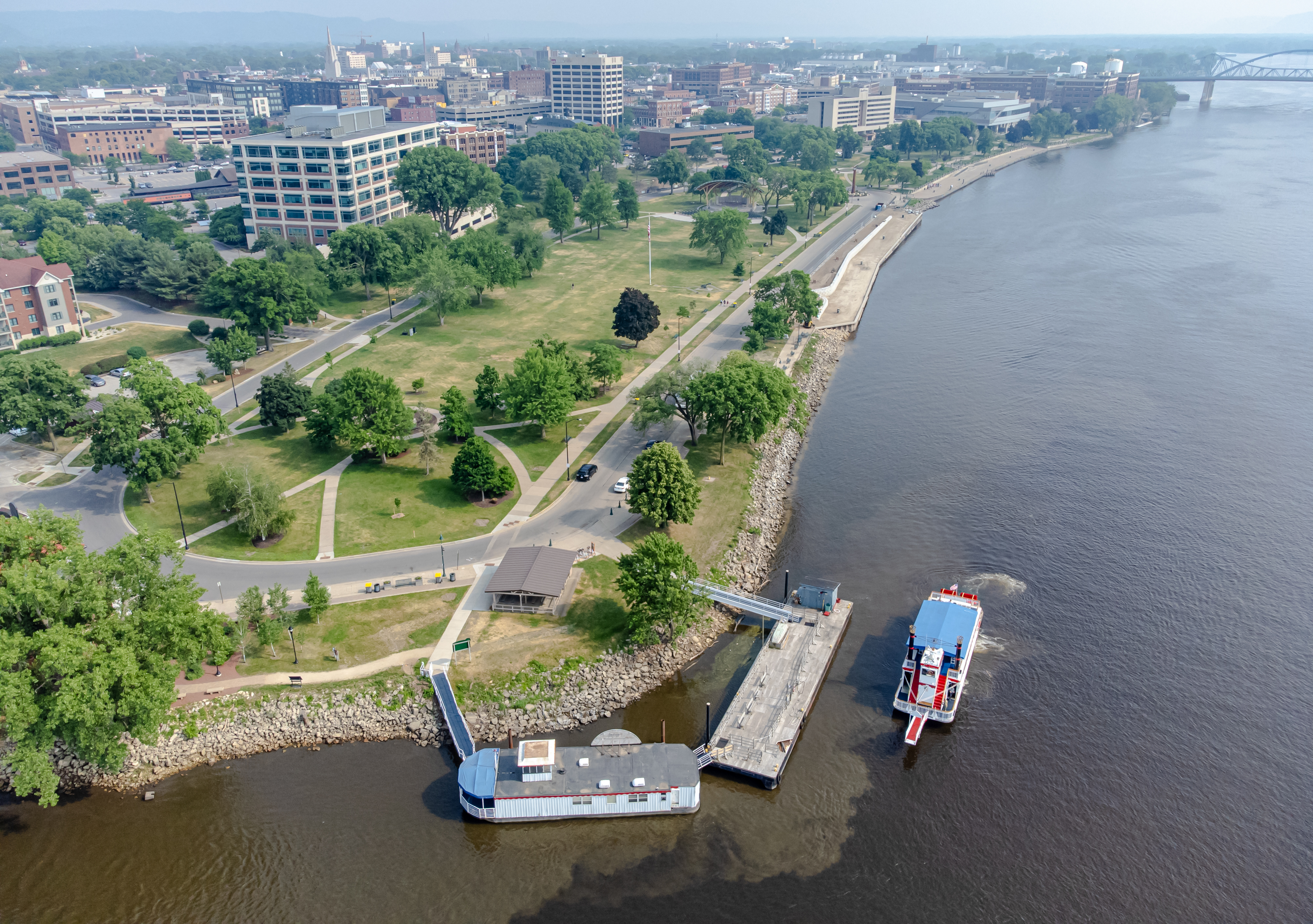
- La Crosse Skyline and Mississippi River Downtown La Crosse UW–La Crosse Grandad Bluff La Crosse Center Riverside Park

- Seal
- Interactive map of La Crosse, Wisconsin
- Location within Wisconsin Location within the United States
- Coordinates: 43°48′48″N 91°13′59″W
- Country: United States
- State: Wisconsin
- County: La Crosse
- Established: 1842

Government
  - Type: Mayor-council government
  - Mayor: Shaundel Washington-Spivey (D)

Area
  - City: 23.79 sq mi (61.61 km^{2})
  - Land: 21.70 sq mi (56.21 km^{2})
  - Water: 2.08 sq mi (5.40 km^{2})
- Elevation: 669 ft (204 m)

Population (2020)
  - City: 52,680
  - Estimate (2024): 51,049 ▼
  - Rank: US: 763rd WI: 12th
  - Density: 2,360.4/sq mi (911.34/km^{2})
  - Urban: 98,872 (US: 314th)
  - Metro: 139,211 (US: 299th)
- Time zone: UTC−6 (Central)
  - Summer (DST): UTC−5 (Central)
- Zip Code: 54601, 54602, 54603
- Area code: 608
- FIPS code: 55-40775
- GNIS feature ID: 1567672
- Waterways: Mississippi River, Black River, La Crosse River
- Public Transit: La Crosse MTU; SMRT; Amtrak
- Website: www.cityoflacrosse.org

La Crosse (/ləˈkrɒs/ lə-KROSS) is a city in La Crosse County, Wisconsin, United States, and its county seat. Positioned alongside the Mississippi River, La Crosse is the most populous city on Wisconsin's western border. The population was 52,680 at the 2020 census. The La Crosse–Onalaska metropolitan area has an estimated 140,000 residents.

La Crosse serves as a regional educational, medical, manufacturing, and transportation hub for Western Wisconsin producing a gross domestic product (GDP) of $10.1 billion for the La Crosse–Onalaska metropolitan area as of 2023. Home to the University of Wisconsin–La Crosse, Viterbo University, and Western Technical College, the city has nearly 20,000 students. The La Crosse area is home to the headquarters or regional offices of Kwik Trip, Organic Valley, Mayo Clinic, Gundersen Health System, Gensler, La Crosse Technology, City Brewing Company, and Trane.

== History ==
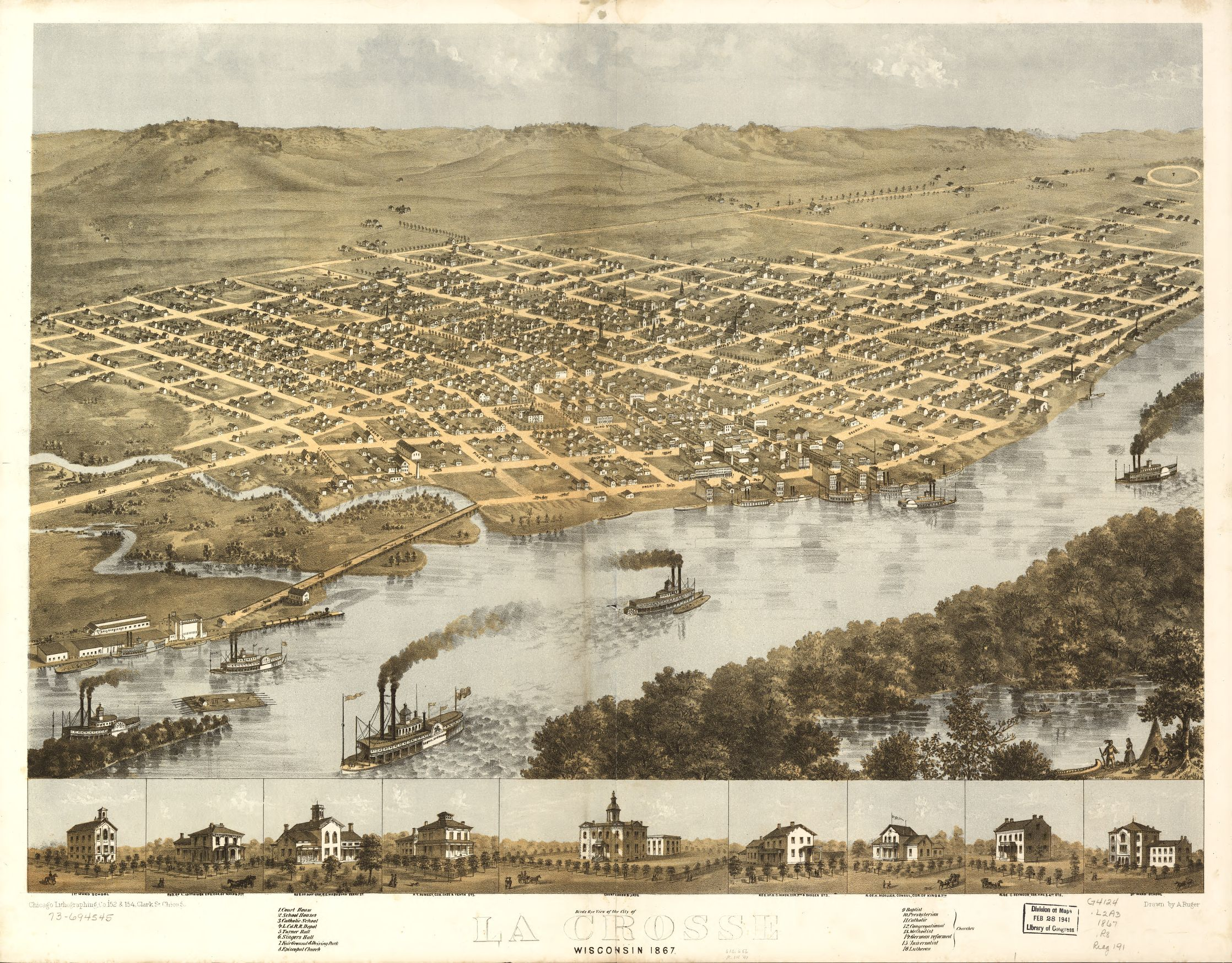
Artist's representation of La Crosse (1867)

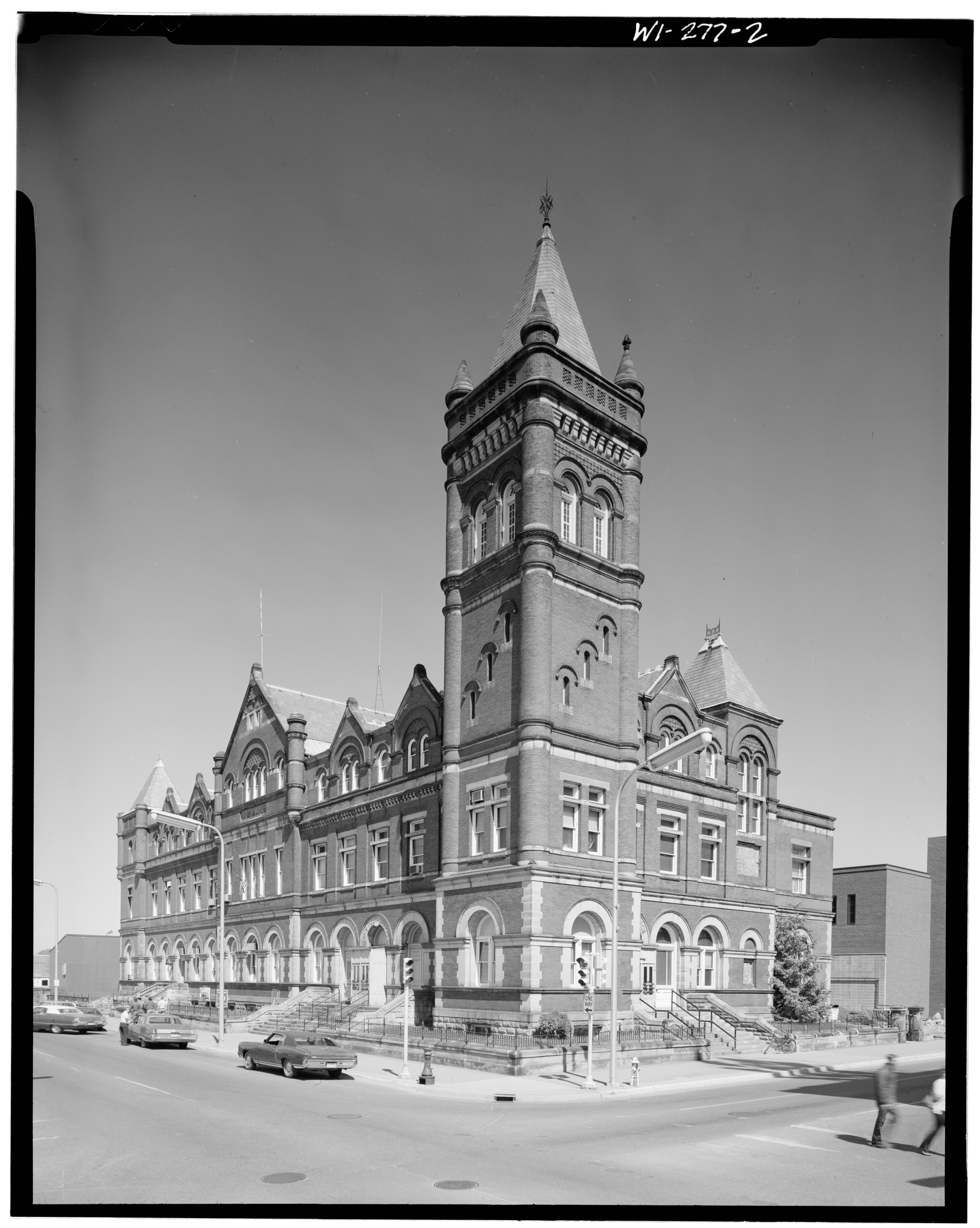
Former post office in La Crosse

=== 18th century ===
The first Europeans to see the region were French explorers who traveled the Mississippi River in the late 17th century. There is no written record of any visit to the site until 1805, when Lt. Zebulon Pike mounted an expedition up the Mississippi River for the United States. Pike recorded the location's name as "Prairie La Crosse". The name originated from the game with sticks that resembled a bishop's crozier or la crosse in French, which was played by Native Americans there.

=== 19th century ===
In 1841, the first white settlement at La Crosse was established when Nathan Myrick, a New York native, moved to the village at Prairie du Chien, Wisconsin, to work in the fur trade. Myrick was disappointed to find that because many fur traders were already well-entrenched there, there were no openings for him in the trade. As a result, he decided to establish a trading post upriver at the then still unsettled site of Prairie La Crosse. In 1841, he built a temporary trading post on Barron Island (now called Pettibone Park), which lies just west of La Crosse's present downtown. The following year, Myrick relocated the post to the mainland prairie, partnering with H. J. B. Miller to run the outfit.

The spot Myrick chose to build his trading post proved ideal for settlement. It was near the junction of the Black, La Crosse, and Mississippi Rivers. In addition, the post was built at one of the few points along the Wisconsin side of the Mississippi River where a broad plain, ideal for development, existed between the river's bank and the tall bluffs that line the river valley. Because of these advantages, a small village grew around Myrick's trading post in the 1840s.

In 1844, a small Mormon community settled at La Crosse, building several dozen cabins a few miles (kilometers) south of Myrick's post. Although these settlers relocated away from the Midwest after just a year, the land they occupied near La Crosse continues to bear the name Mormon Coulee. On June 23, 1850, Father James Lloyd Breck of the Episcopal Church said the first Christian liturgy on top of Grandad Bluff. Today, a monument to that event stands atop the bluff, near the parking lot at a scenic overlook.

More permanent development took place closer to Myrick's trading post, where stores, a hotel, and a post office were constructed during the 1840s. Under the direction of Timothy Burns, lieutenant governor of Wisconsin, surveyor William Hood platted the village in 1851. This opened it up for further settlement, which was achieved rapidly as a result of promotion of the city in eastern newspapers. By 1855, La Crosse had grown in population to nearly 2,000 residents, leading to its incorporation in 1856. The city grew even more rapidly after 1858 with the completion of the La Crosse & Milwaukee Railroad, the second railroad connecting Milwaukee to the Mississippi River.

During the second half of the 19th century, La Crosse grew to become one of the largest cities in Wisconsin. It was a center of the lumber industry, for logs cut in the interior of the state could be rafted down the Black River toward sawmills built in the city. La Crosse also became a center for the brewing industry and other manufacturers that saw advantages in the city's location adjacent to major transportation arteries, such as the Mississippi River and the railroad between Milwaukee and St. Paul, Minnesota.

=== 20th century ===
Around the turn of the 20th century, the city became a center for education, with three colleges and universities established in the city between 1890 and 1912. Similar to cities across the country, La Crosse saw population stagnation in the latter half of the 20th century as a result of suburbanization. Since 1966, La Crosse has seen its population grow by 10.73%, while its area, miles of sewer, and miles of water mains each grew by more than 50%. La Crosse remains the largest city on Wisconsin's western border, and the educational institutions in the city have recently led it toward becoming a regional technology and medical hub.

=== 21st century ===
In 2016, Mayor Tim Kabat and former Mayor John Medinger issued a proclamation apologizing for La Crosse's history as a sundown town that discriminated against African Americans.

== Geography ==
La Crosse is located on the western border of the midsection of Wisconsin, on a broad alluvial plain along the east side of the Mississippi River. The Black River empties into the Mississippi north of the city, and the La Crosse River flows into the Mississippi just north of the downtown area. Just upriver from its mouth, this river broadens into a marshland that splits the city into two distinct sections, north and south.

According to the United States Census Bureau, the city has a total area of 23.79 square miles (61.62 km^{2}), of which 21.7 square miles (56.20 km^{2}) is land and 2.08 square miles (5.39 km^{2}) is water.

Surrounding the relatively flat prairie valley where La Crosse lies are towering 500-foot (150 m) bluffs, one of the most prominent of which is Grandad Bluff (mentioned in Life on the Mississippi by Mark Twain), which has an overlook of the three states region. This feature typifies the topography of the Driftless Area in which La Crosse sits. This rugged region is composed of high ridges dissected by narrow valleys called coulees, a French term. As a result, the area around La Crosse is frequently referred to as the "Coulee Region".

=== Climate ===
La Crosse's location in the United States' Upper Midwest gives the area a hot-summer humid continental climate (Koppen Dfa). The warmest month of the year is July, when the average high temperature is 85.4 °F (29.7 °C), with overnight low temperatures averaging 64.5 °F (18.1 °C). January is the coldest month, with high temperatures averaging 27.4 °F (−2.6 °C), with the overnight low temperatures around 10.5 °F (−11.9 °C).

Climate data for La Crosse Regional Airport, Wisconsin (1991–2020 normals, extremes 1872–present)
Month	Jan	Feb	Mar	Apr	May	Jun	Jul	Aug	Sep	Oct	Nov	Dec	Year
Record high °F (°C)	58 (14)	69 (21)	86 (30)	93 (34)	107 (42)	102 (39)	108 (42)	105 (41)	101 (38)	93 (34)	80 (27)	69 (21)	108 (42)
Mean maximum °F (°C)	45.8 (7.7)	50.5 (10.3)	67.7 (19.8)	81.7 (27.6)	89.1 (31.7)	94.0 (34.4)	95.2 (35.1)	93.3 (34.1)	89.9 (32.2)	81.5 (27.5)	64.3 (17.9)	49.5 (9.7)	97.3 (36.3)
Mean daily maximum °F (°C)	27.4 (−2.6)	32.5 (0.3)	45.6 (7.6)	59.6 (15.3)	72.0 (22.2)	81.7 (27.6)	85.4 (29.7)	83.2 (28.4)	75.5 (24.2)	61.6 (16.4)	45.8 (7.7)	32.6 (0.3)	58.6 (14.8)
Daily mean °F (°C)	18.9 (−7.3)	23.3 (−4.8)	35.8 (2.1)	49.0 (9.4)	61.0 (16.1)	71.0 (21.7)	75.0 (23.9)	72.8 (22.7)	64.8 (18.2)	51.7 (10.9)	37.6 (3.1)	25.1 (−3.8)	48.8 (9.3)
Mean daily minimum °F (°C)	10.5 (−11.9)	14.2 (−9.9)	26.0 (−3.3)	38.4 (3.6)	50.1 (10.1)	60.4 (15.8)	64.5 (18.1)	62.3 (16.8)	54.1 (12.3)	41.9 (5.5)	29.5 (−1.4)	17.6 (−8.0)	39.1 (3.9)
Mean minimum °F (°C)	−13.8 (−25.4)	−8.8 (−22.7)	2.1 (−16.6)	22.7 (−5.2)	34.5 (1.4)	45.7 (7.6)	52.9 (11.6)	50.3 (10.2)	38.1 (3.4)	26.2 (−3.2)	12.3 (−10.9)	−5.9 (−21.1)	−17.3 (−27.4)
Record low °F (°C)	−43 (−42)	−36 (−38)	−28 (−33)	7 (−14)	26 (−3)	33 (1)	44 (7)	35 (2)	24 (−4)	6 (−14)	−21 (−29)	−37 (−38)	−43 (−42)
Average precipitation inches (mm)	1.25 (32)	1.19 (30)	2.04 (52)	3.75 (95)	4.33 (110)	5.08 (129)	4.23 (107)	3.90 (99)	3.63 (92)	2.49 (63)	1.85 (47)	1.49 (38)	35.23 (895)
Average snowfall inches (cm)	11.8 (30)	9.7 (25)	7.3 (19)	2.9 (7.4)	0.0 (0.0)	0.0 (0.0)	0.0 (0.0)	0.0 (0.0)	0.0 (0.0)	0.3 (0.76)	3.4 (8.6)	10.9 (28)	46.3 (118)
Average precipitation days (≥ 0.01 in)	10.2	8.5	9.9	12.2	13.3	11.8	10.1	9.4	9.6	9.2	8.9	9.8	122.9
Average snowy days (≥ 0.1 in)	8.6	7.2	4.5	2.0	0.0	0.0	0.0	0.0	0.0	0.3	3.2	7.5	33.3
Average relative humidity (%)	72.8	72.2	70.6	64.2	65.0	69.5	72.1	75.2	77.2	71.3	75.4	77.3	71.9
Average dew point °F (°C)	7.5 (−13.6)	12.0 (−11.1)	23.4 (−4.8)	34.0 (1.1)	45.9 (7.7)	56.7 (13.7)	62.6 (17.0)	61.0 (16.1)	53.1 (11.7)	39.9 (4.4)	27.9 (−2.3)	14.7 (−9.6)	36.6 (2.5)
Source: NOAA (relative humidity and dew point 1961–1990)

=== Neighborhoods and districts ===
La Crosse has 13 voting districts (wards). Neighborhoods within the city include:

- Bluffside
- Washburn
- Historic Cass & King
- Powell-Poage-Hamilton
- Historic downtown
- Northside (Upper and Lower) and Old Towne North
- Grandview Emerson
- Weigent Hogan
- Hintgen
- College Park (UW–La Crosse campus district)
- Springbrook Clayton Johnson
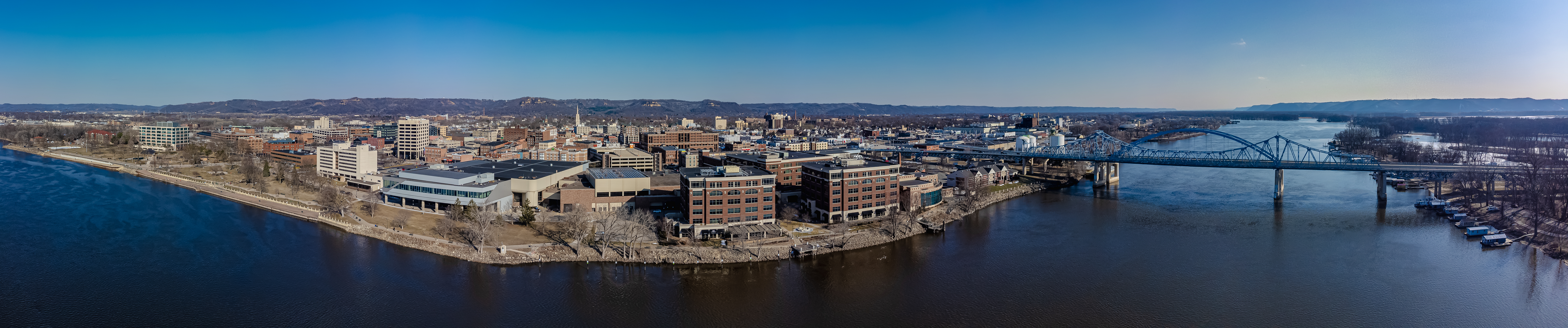
La Crosse Riverside Park and Downtown La Crosse

=== Area ===
Area in square miles
	Land area	Water area	Total area	Population density
1970	n/a	n/a	16.84	2,986.10
1980	n/a	n/a	18.02	2,682.96
2000	20.136	2.024	22.16	2,338.36
2010	20.516	2.021	22.537	2,277.14
2015	20.562	2.042	22.604	n/a
2020	21.703	2.085	23.788	2,214.56
2021	21.703	2.085	23.788	n/a

== Demographics ==
Historical population
Census	Pop.	Note	%±
1860	3,860		—
1870	7,785		101.7%
1880	14,505		86.3%
1890	25,000		72.4%
1900	28,895		15.6%
1910	30,417		5.3%
1920	30,421		0.0%
1930	39,614		30.2%
1940	42,707		7.8%
1950	47,535		11.3%
1960	47,258		−0.6%
1970	50,286		6.4%
1980	48,347		−3.9%
1990	51,140		5.8%
2000	51,818		1.3%
2010	51,320		−1.0%
2020	52,680		2.7%
2021 (est.)	51,380		−2.5%
U.S. Decennial Census; 2020 Census

=== 2020 census ===
As of the 2020 census, La Crosse had a population of 52,680. The population density was 2,427.3 inhabitants per square mile (937.2/km^{2}). There were 24,221 housing units at an average density of 1,116.0 per square mile (430.9/km^{2}). The population living in college or university student housing was 3,897. The median age was 30.7 years. 15.5% of residents were under the age of 18 and 15.2% were 65 years of age or older. For every 100 females there were 93.7 males, and for every 100 females age 18 and over there were 92.5 males age 18 and over.

99.6% of residents lived in urban areas, while 0.4% lived in rural areas.

There were 22,779 households in La Crosse, of which 18.5% had children under the age of 18 living in them. Of all households, 29.0% were married-couple households, 27.9% were households with a male householder and no spouse or partner present, and 34.0% were households with a female householder and no spouse or partner present. About 40.7% of all households were made up of individuals and 13.2% had someone living alone who was 65 years of age or older.

Of the 24,221 housing units, 6.0% were vacant. The homeowner vacancy rate was 1.1% and the rental vacancy rate was 5.2%.

Racial composition as of the 2020 census
Race	Number	Percent
White	45,072	85.6%
Black or African American	1,533	2.9%
American Indian and Alaska Native	280	0.5%
Asian	2,566	4.9%
Native Hawaiian and Other Pacific Islander	13	0.0%
Some other race	614	1.2%
Two or more races	2,602	4.9%
Hispanic or Latino (of any race)	1,693	3.2%

=== 2016–2020 American Community Survey ===
According to the American Community Survey estimates for 2016–2020, the median income for a household in the city was $46,438, and the median income for a family was $66,928. Male full-time workers had a median income of $43,438 versus $37,215 for female workers. The per capita income for the city was $27,398. About 7.9% of families and 22.9% of the population were below the poverty line, including 13.6% of those under age 18 and 10.9% of those age 65 or over. Of the population age 25 and over, 93.9% were high school graduates or higher and 36.5% had a bachelor's degree or higher.

=== Hmong community ===
Per the 2022 American Community Survey five-year estimates, the Hmong population was 1,435 comprising approximately 60% of the city's Asian population.

=== Religion ===
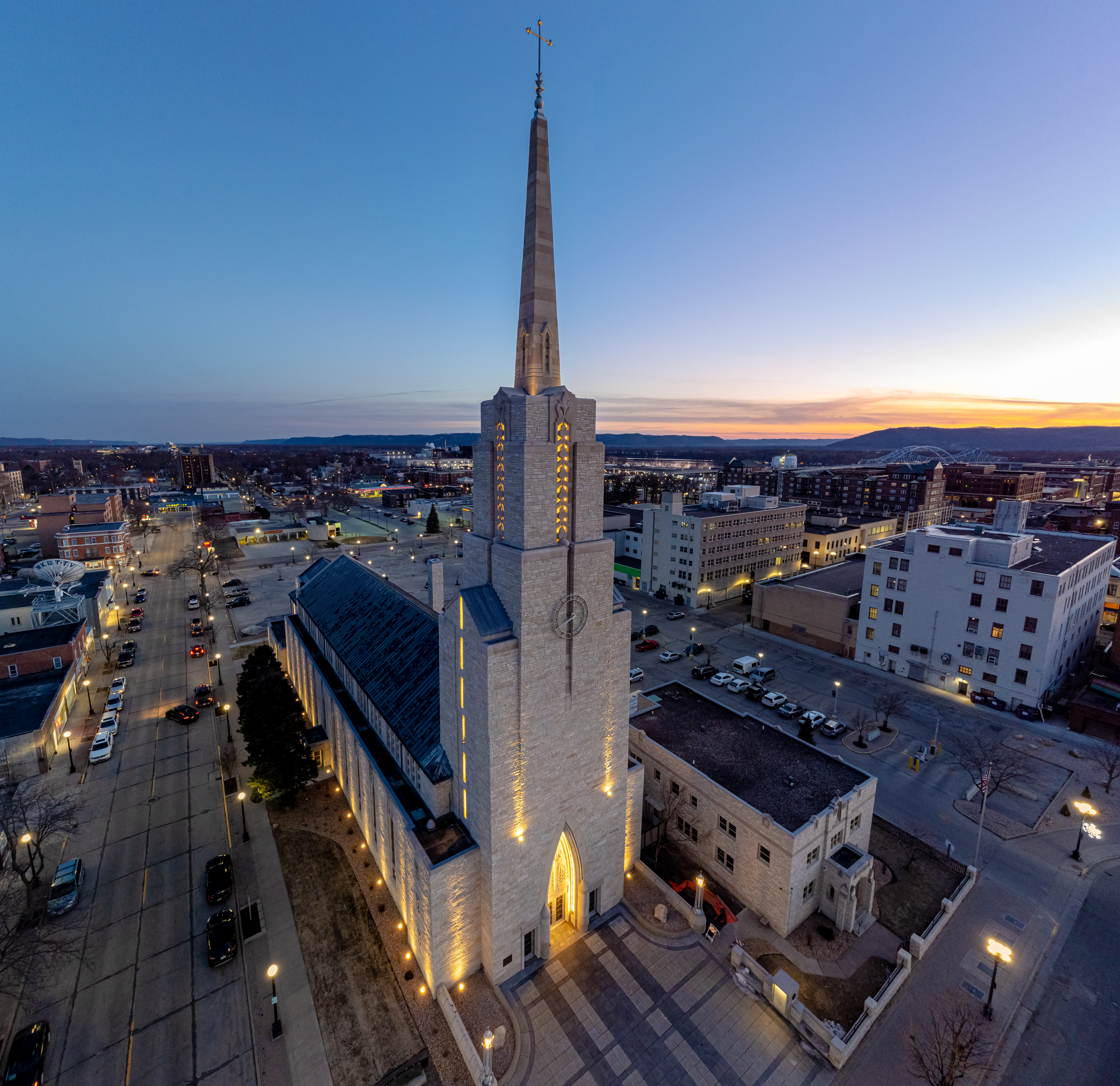
Cathedral of Saint Joseph the Workman

La Crosse is the episcopal see for the Roman Catholic Diocese of La Crosse. The Cathedral of Saint Joseph the Workman serves as the seat of the Diocese. The city is also home to St. Rose of Viterbo Convent, the mother house of the Franciscan Sisters of Perpetual Adoration, and the Shrine of Our Lady of Guadalupe. An independent catholic school district in the city, La Crosse Aquinas Catholic Schools, is also overseen by the diocese.

Protestant churches in the city include Lutheran, Evangelical, Baptist, Methodist, Presbyterian, and independent traditions. The Wisconsin Evangelical Lutheran Synod has five churches in La Crosse: First Lutheran Church, Grace Lutheran Church, Immanuel Lutheran Church, Mt. Calvary Lutheran Church, and St. John's Lutheran Church. La Crosse is also home to two churches affiliated with the Evangelical Free Church of America; Bethany Church, and Neighborhood City Church. Christ Church of La Crosse, the city's Episcopal church, is listed on the National Register of Historic Places. St. Elias Antiochian Orthodox Church, the city's Eastern Orthodox Church, is listed on the city's local register of Historic places.

Other religious groups within the city include the Congregation Sons of Abraham, a Jewish synagogue; the Unitarian Universalist Fellowship of La Crosse, which has held services since 1951; the Islamic Society Othman Bin Afaan; and the Hmong Faith Alliance Church.

== Economy ==
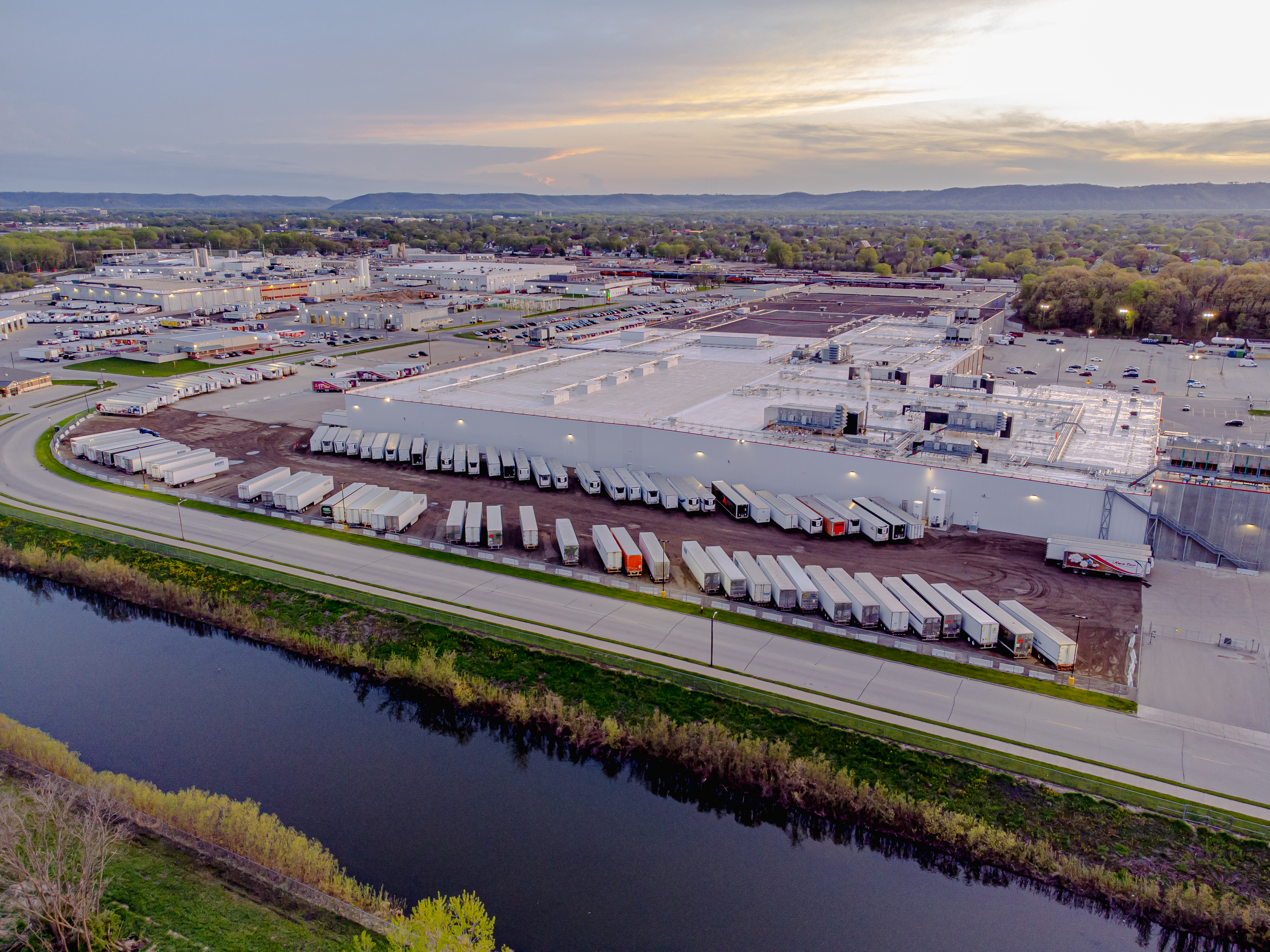
Kwik Trip headquarters

La Crosse is the home and current global headquarters of several corporations and organizations, including:

- Allergy Associates of La Crosse and Allergychoices, Inc., national allergy clinic and allergy services organization
- Altra Federal Credit Union, regional credit union
- City Brewing Company, former Heileman Old Style brewery
- Franciscan Skemp Medical Center, health care network with flagship campus in La Crosse
- Gundersen Health System, health care network with flagship campus in La Crosse
- Kwik Trip, regional gas and convenience stores
- La Crosse Technology, manufacturer of radio-controlled clocks and weather stations
- Marine Credit Union, regional credit union

Corporations founded and formerly headquartered in La Crosse include:

- Cargill, America's now largest privately held corporation founded in La Crosse
- La Croix Sparkling Water, carbonated drink originally created by the G. Heileman Brewing Company
- LaCrosse Footwear, footwear company founded in 1897
- Trane, international air conditioning, acquired by Ingersoll-Rand in 2008

=== Largest employers ===
As of 2012, the 10 largest employers in La Crosse were:

1. Gundersen Health System
2. Mayo Clinic Health System (Franciscan Skemp Medical Center)
3. Trane
4. Kwik Trip
5. La Crosse County
6. School District of La Crosse
7. University of Wisconsin–La Crosse
8. Logistics Health Incorporated
9. City of La Crosse
10. Western Technical College

=== Shopping ===
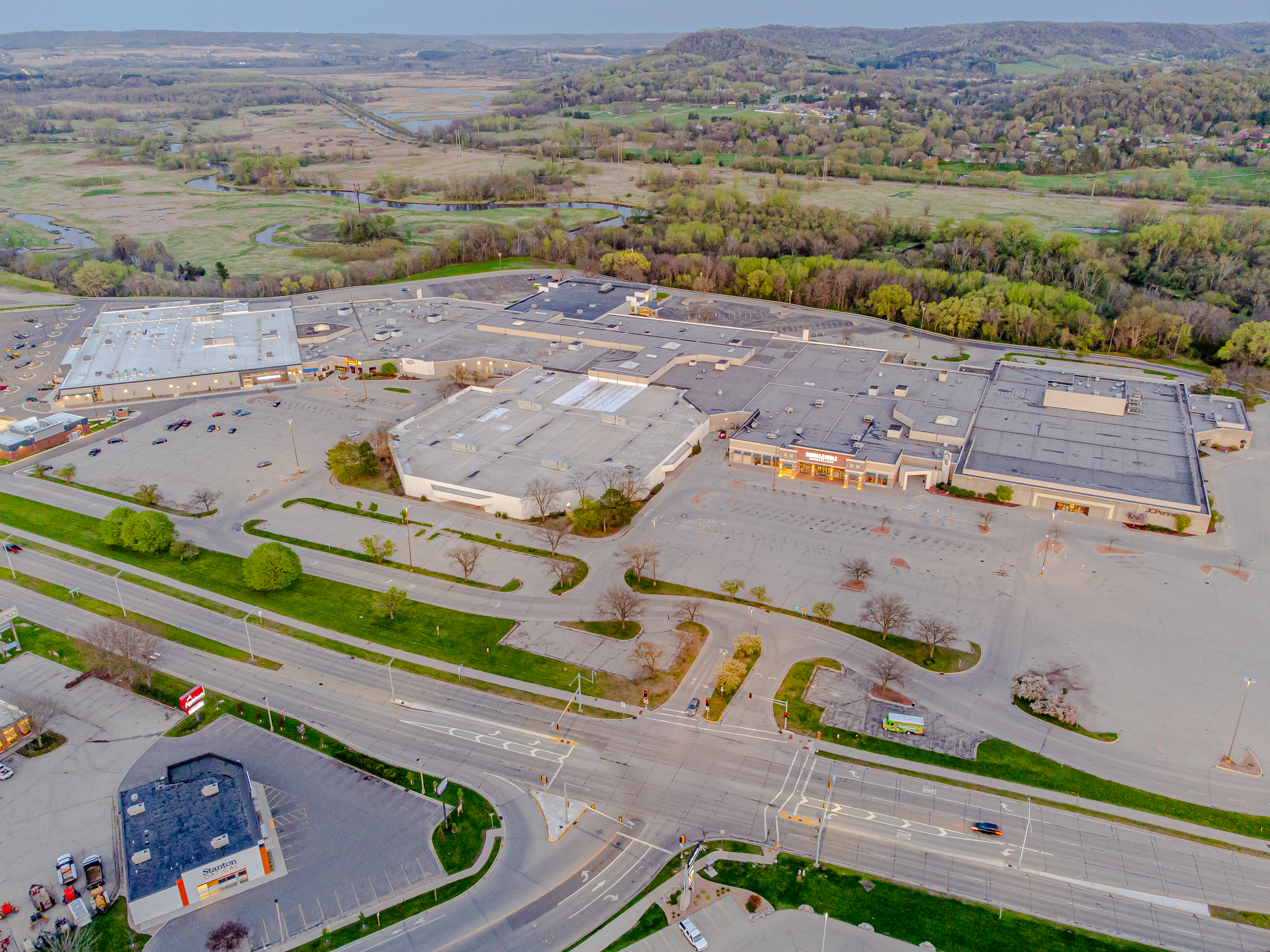
Valley View Mall, La Crosse

La Crosse and the surrounding communities form a regional commercial center and shopping hub. In the northeastern region of the city lies the area's largest shopping center, Valley View Mall. The surrounding area includes numerous big-box stores, and many restaurants. Other shopping centers in the La Crosse region include Three Rivers Plaza, Marsh View Center, Shelby Mall, Jackson Plaza, Bridgeview Plaza, and the Village Shopping Center. Downtown La Crosse has experienced a resurgence in recent years, providing shopping, farmers' markets, hotels, restaurants, and specialty shops.

== Arts and culture ==
La Crosse has over 30 active arts organizations. The Pump House Regional Arts Center hosts visual arts exhibits throughout the year plus its own series of jazz, folk, and blues performers. The La Crosse Symphony is the city's regional orchestra and the La Crosse Community Theater has won both regional and national acclaim. The city is home to the Blue Stars Drum and Bugle Corps, a member of Drum Corps International. Other arts sites include Viterbo University Fine Arts building, UW–La Crosse Art Gallery and Theater, and the La Crosse Center, which hosts national performers. Local sculptor Elmer Petersen has created sculptures that are exhibited throughout the downtown area, including La Crosse Players and the Eagle in Riverside Park. It also hosts a yearly St Patrick's Day Parade as well as Irishfest La Crosse in August.

The La Crosse Center, a convention center and arena located in downtown La Crosse on the Mississippi River, hosts a variety of sporting events, concerts, exhibits, and shows. The city annually hosts Oktoberfest USA, an Oktoberfest celebration first established in 1961.

== Parks and recreation ==
=== Sport ===
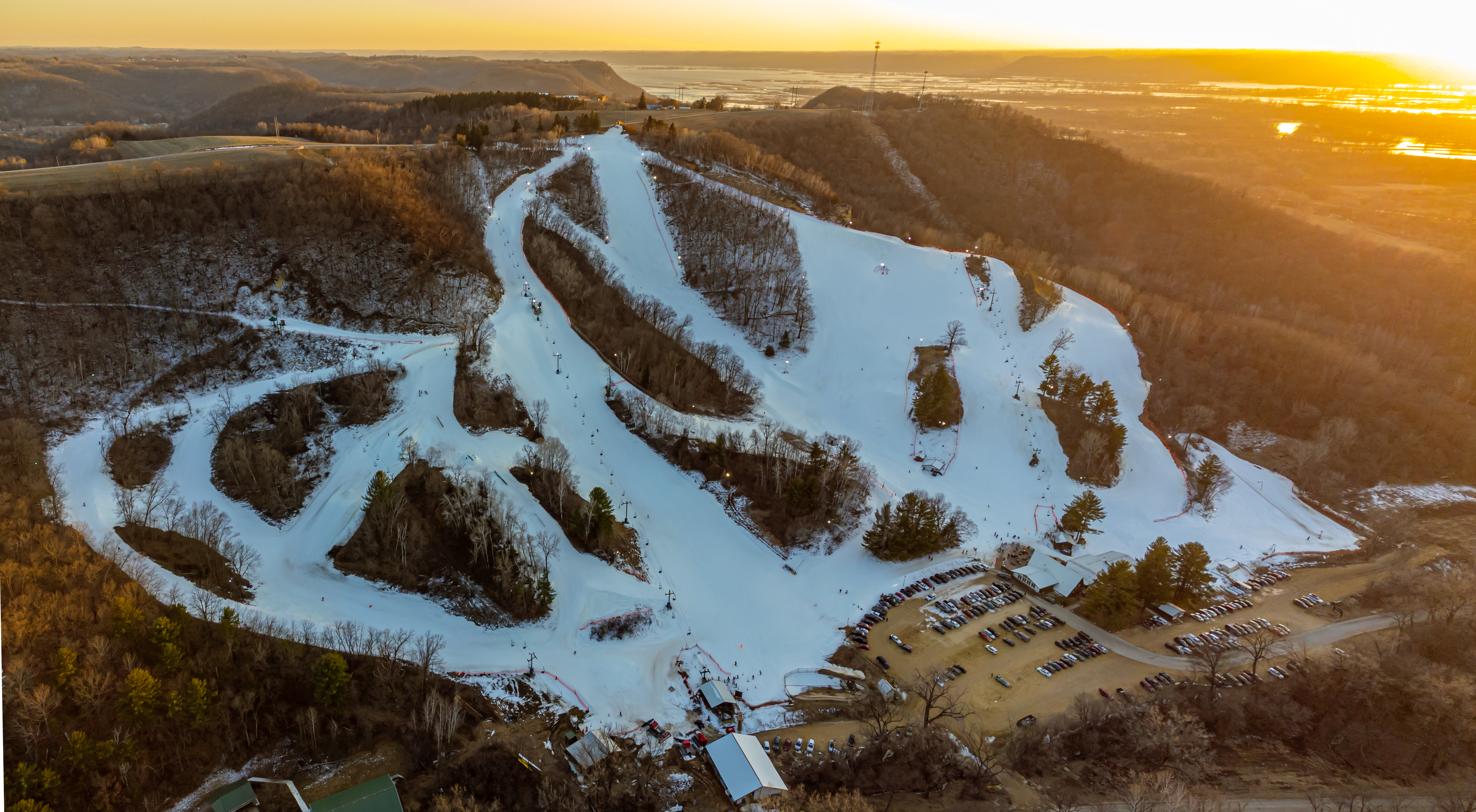
Mt. La Crosse on the edge of the south side of La Crosse, in the Town of Shelby

The La Crosse Loggers (baseball) and La Crosse Steam (softball) of the Northwoods League play at their home field at Copeland Park on the north side of La Crosse in the summer months. In 2017, the La Crosse Showtime began play in the American Basketball Association at La Crosse Center. In the past, the La Crosse Center has been home to the Catbirds and the Bobcats of the CBA, as well as the River Rats of the IFL, the Spartans of the IFL and the Night Train of the NIFL. In the winter season, the Coulee Region Chill was a junior team in the North American 3 Hockey League at the Green Island Ice Arena. Additionally, the area's only ski hill, Mt. La Crosse, opened in 1959 and has 19 slopes and trails. The ski hill is home to Damnation!, Mid-America's steepest trail.

The University of Wisconsin–La Crosse's Eagles compete in NCAA Division III. The university's 10,000 seat Veterans Memorial Field for football (turf field) and outdoor timed track opened in 2009 and hosts the WIAA Wisconsin high school outdoor track and field state championships.

=== Parks ===
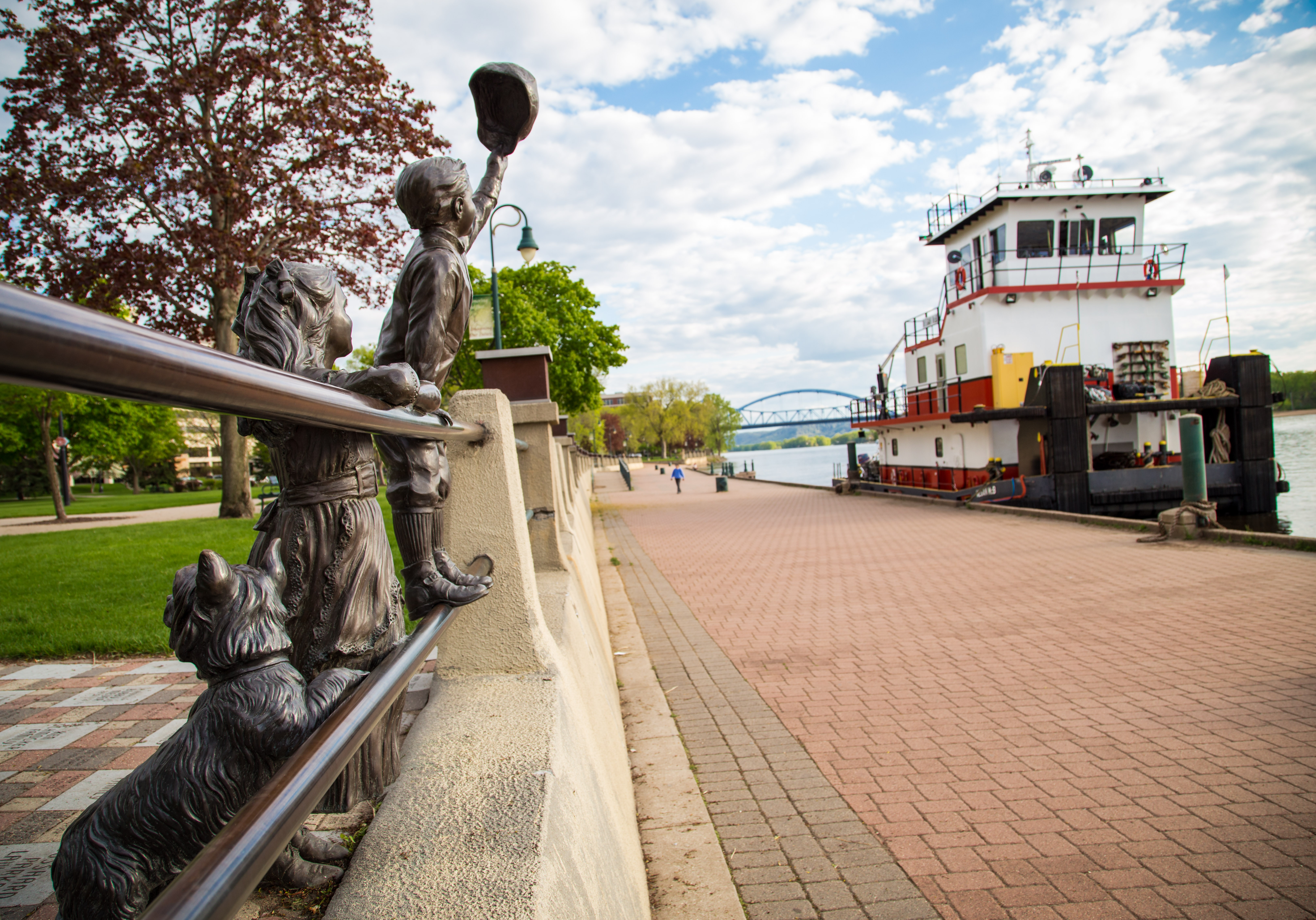
A Simpler Time statue and Riverside Park levee

Riverside Park is situated on the riverfront of downtown La Crosse near the Blue Bridges. It hosts events such as Riverfest, Fourth of July fireworks, Oktoberfest, and the Rotary Lights. Several steamboats make stops along the river in the park, including the American Queen, La Crosse Queen, and Julia Belle Swain. The park has walking/running trails. The park was previously home to a controversial Statue of Hiawatha. Long standing public debate about whether the statue was offensive or presented a caricature based on stereotypes of Native Americans eventually led to its removal in 2020, nearly 60 years after it was erected.

Pettibone Park is located on Baron Island, across the river from Riverside Park and the downtown area. The island was originally part of the state of Minnesota. The land was transferred to Wisconsin and eventually the City of La Crosse following a border dispute that was resolved in 1919. Today the park has a variety of recreational facilities, including a beach and disc golf course.

An extensive marsh, a natural floodplain created by the La Crosse River, divides the city between north and south. The area is protected as an important wildlife habitat and watershed to the Mississippi River. Several biking and walking paths cross through the marshland which is also used for canoeing, fishing and trapping. On the southern end of the marsh lies Myrick Park. The park was named after the city's first European settler: Nathan Myrick. It has many recreational amenities as well as a nature center and environmental education department. Hunting and fishing are very popular all seasons of the year and the Mississippi and other rivers, sloughs, creeks, lakes, the Upper Mississippi River Wildlife Refuge and hilltops and valleys with public woodlands are available to sportsmen and families.

== Government ==
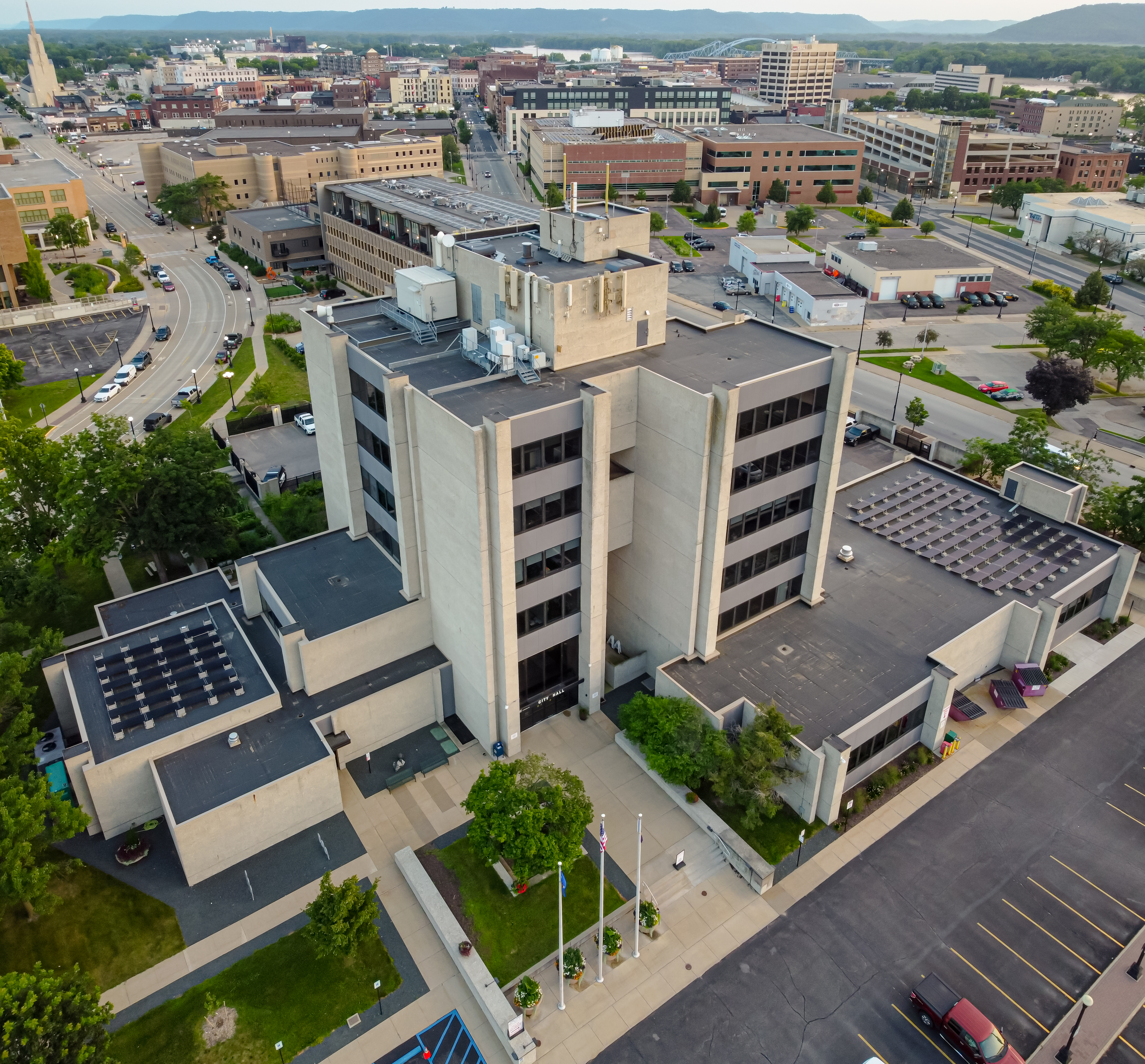
La Crosse City Hall

The city government employs a weak mayor form of the mayor-council system. The mayor is elected at-large, while the 13 members of the Common Council are elected per aldermanic districts. Mitch Reynolds defeated Vicki Markussen in the 2021 La Crosse Mayoral election, succeeding retiring incumbent Tim Kabat. Kabat served as Mayor from 2013 to 2021. In the 2025 Mayoral election, Shaundel Washington-Spivey defeated Chris Kahlow making history as the city's first African American and openly LGBTQ+ mayor-elect.

Both the city and county of La Crosse have voted Democratic in every presidential election since 1988. In the 2016 Presidential Election, Hillary Clinton won the City of La Crosse with 58% of the vote. In the 2012 presidential election, Barack Obama won 65% of the vote in the City of La Crosse and 58% of La Crosse County. In 2014, the Milwaukee Journal Sentinel ranked La Crosse as one of Wisconsin's top performing Democratic cities.

In the United States Congress, Republican Derrick Van Orden has represented La Crosse as part of Wisconsin's 3rd congressional district since 2023. For representation in the Wisconsin State Assembly, the city is split between three districts, with most of the central and northwestern parts of the city falling within the 95th district, represented by Democrat Jill Billings; the southern third of the city falls within the 96th district, represented by Democrat Tara Johnson; the northeastern quarter is part of the 94th district, represented by Democrat Steve Doyle. For Wisconsin Senate representations, the three La Crosse Assembly districts make up the 32nd Senate district, which is represented by Democrat Brad Pfaff.

== Education ==
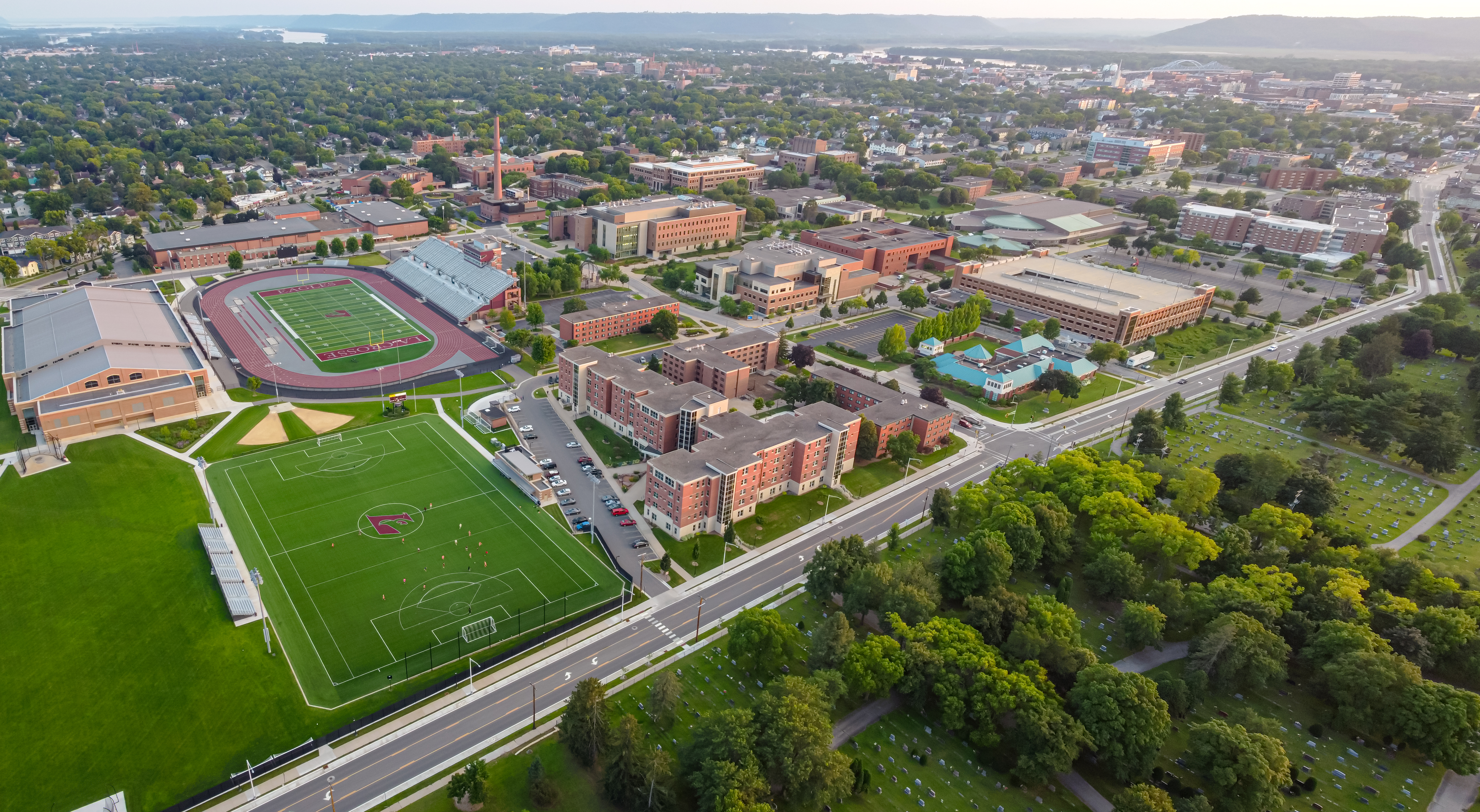
University of Wisconsin–La Crosse campus

The La Crosse area is served by the School District of La Crosse, which as of 2022, had a total enrollment of 6,139 students. As of 2021, the district had 16 separate facilities, providing 20 elementary, middle, high, and charter school programs. A 2021 proposal to consolidate the district's largest high schools, Central High School and Logan High School, in a new facility was voted down in a district-wide referendum in November 2022.

Catholic private schools in La Crosse include La Crosse Aquinas Catholic Schools, a Roman Catholic school district affiliated with the Diocese of La Crosse, which includes Aquinas High School and Aquinas Middle School. Another Roman Catholic school, Providence Academy, has no affiliation with the diocese.

Lutheran private schools in La Crosse include First Lutheran School, Immanuel Lutheran School, and Mt. Calvary-Grace Lutheran School, which are part of the La Crosse Area Lutheran Schools organization and affiliated with the Wisconsin Evangelical Lutheran Synod. The region's largest Lutheran high school, Luther High School is located in Onalaska, Wisconsin.

La Crosse is the home of three regional colleges and universities: the University of Wisconsin–La Crosse, a public university; Western Technical College a public community college; and Viterbo University, a private Roman Catholic institution. The Health Science Center is a combined effort of all the La Crosse medical centers, universities, and government agencies with a goal of advancing students in the medical fields.

== Media ==
Code Blue Cam is a YouTube channel founded in 2021 that publishes police bodycam footage taken in the city.

=== Print ===
La Crosse's largest newspaper is the daily La Crosse Tribune which serves the Wisconsin, Minnesota, and Iowa regions. The Racquet is the University of Wisconsin–La Crosse's free weekly paper. Free weekly tabloids include the Foxxy Shopper and the Buyer's Express. Regional magazines, including the Coulee Parenting Connection and the Coulee Region Women, are also produced in the city.

=== Television ===
Channel	Callsign	Affiliation	Branding	Subchannels	
(virtual)	Callsign	Affiliation	Branding	Channel	Programming
8.1	WKBT; KQEG-CD	CBS	News 8 Now	8.2; 8.3; 8.4; 8.5; 8.6	News 8+ ION; Dabl; QVC; HSN
14.1	W34FC-D	CW	Eau Claire/La Crosse CW	14.2; 14.3; 14.4; 13.10	Heroes & Icons; Start TV; MeTV; NBC (WEAU)
19.1	WXOW	ABC	WXOW 19	19.2; 19.3; 19.4; 19.5	Catchy Comedy; MeTV Toons; Court TV; True Crime
25.1	WLAX	FOX	FOX 25/48	25.2; 25.3; 25.4	Antenna TV; Laff; Grit
26.1	WZEO-LD	Buzzr		26.2; 26.3; 26.8; 26.9	Classic Arts; MovieSphere; TCT; VCY
31.1	WHLA	PBS	PBS Wisconsin	31.2; 31.3; 31.4	Wisconsin Ch. Create; PBS Kids

=== AM radio ===
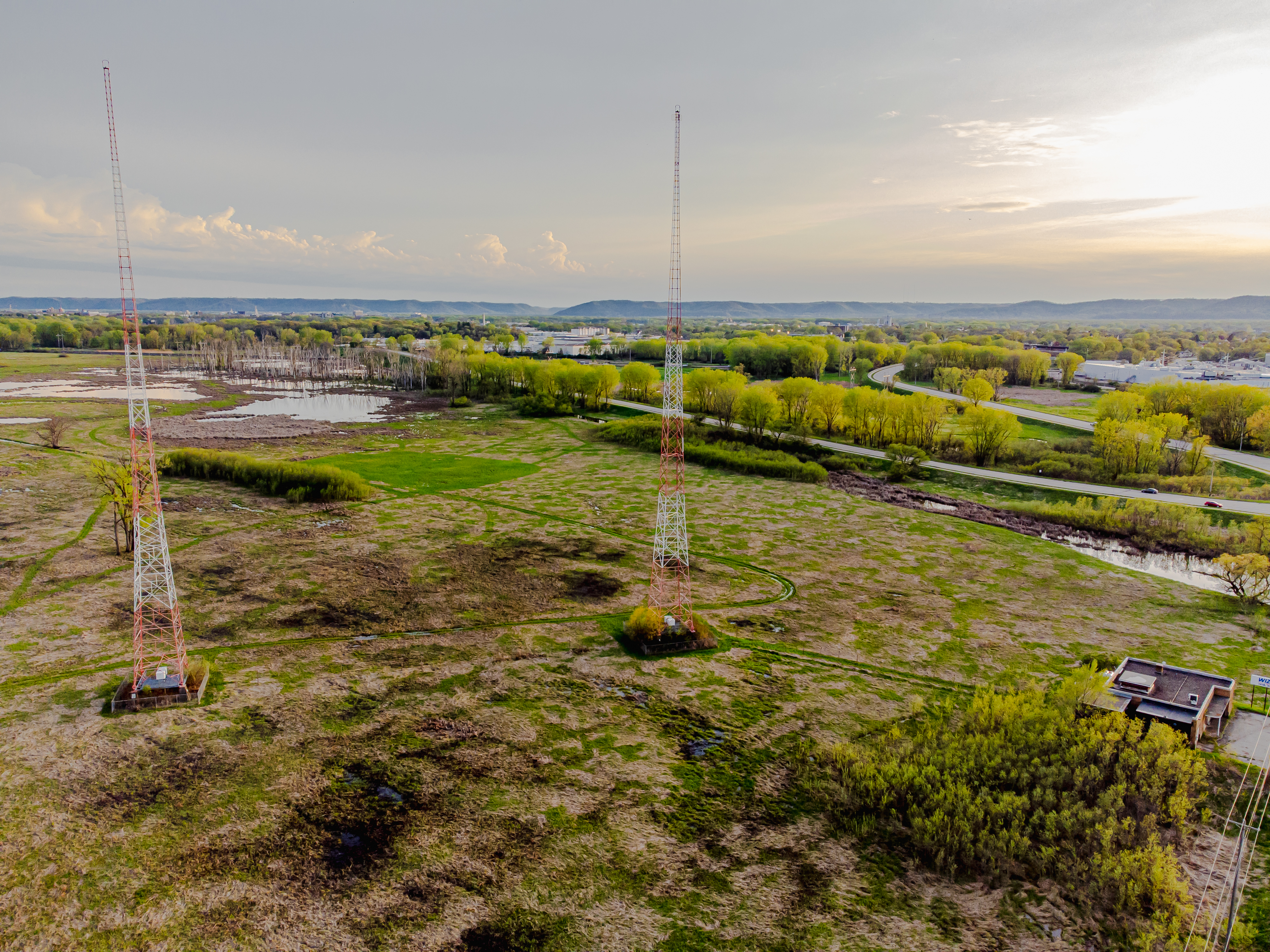
Radio towers in La Crosse

AM radio stations
Frequency	Call sign	Name	Format
580 AM	WKTY		Sports
1410 AM	WIZM	News talk 1410	News/Talk
1490 AM	WLCX	Eagle 1490	News/Talk
1560 AM	WKBH	Relevant Radio	Catholic

=== FM radio ===
FM radio stations
Frequency	Call sign	Name	Format
88.1 FM	K201BW (KZSE Translator)	MPR News	Public
88.9 FM	WLSU	Wisconsin Public Radio	Classic
90.3 FM	WHLA	Wisconsin Public Radio	Public
91.1 FM	KXLC	Minnesota Public Radio	Public
91.9 FM	K220EP (KFSI Translator)	KFSI 92.9	Christian
91.9 FM	WDRT	Driftless Community Radio	Community
92.3 FM	K222AG (WIZM-AM Translator)	News talk 1410	News/Talk
92.5 FM	K223AH (KFSI Translator)	KFSI 92.9	Christian
93.3 FM	WIZM	Z93.3	Top 40/CHR
93.7 FM	K229BH (WWIB Translator)	103.7 WWIB	Christian
94.1 FM	W231DL (WKBH-AM Translator)	Relevant Radio	Catholic
94.5 FM	WTMB	Classic Rock 94.5	Classic rock
94.7 FM	KCLH	Classic Hits 94.7	Classic Hits
95.7 FM	WRQT	95.7 The Rock	Active Rock
96.1 FM	WLXR	Mix 96.1	Adult Contemporary
96.7 FM	K244FM (WKTY-AM Translator)		Sports
97.1 FM	WCOW	Cow 97.1 Country	Country
97.9 FM	K250AZ (WLXR Translator)	Mix 96.1	Adult Contemporary
98.9 FM	WVCX	VCY America	Christian
99.3 FM	KWMN	The Fan Winona	Sports
99.7 FM	WWIS	The Star	Classic Country
100.1 FM	WLCW	K-Love	Christian Contemporary
100.5 FM	KDHK	100.5 The Hawk	Hot adult contemporary
101.1 FM	KRIV	101.1 The River	Classic Hits
101.9 FM	K270AG (WFBZ Translator)	105.5 ESPN	Sports
102.7 FM	WKBH-FM	102.7 WKBH	Classic Rock; Classic Hits
103.5 FM	KNEI	Bluff Country	Country
104.5 FM	WAXX	Today's WAXX 104.5	Country
104.9 FM	WEQL	Prayz Network	Christian Contemporary
105.5 FM	WFBZ	105.5 ESPN	Sports
105.9 FM	WKPO	KPO-FM	Adult Hits
106.3 FM	WQCC	Kicks 106.3	Country
106.7 FM	W294CU (WIZM-AM Translator)	News talk 1410	News/Talk
107.1 FM	W296EH (WKBH-FM Translator)	Alt 107.1	Alternative rock
107.7 FM	W299AC (KQYB Translator)	KQ98	Country

== Infrastructure ==
=== Transportation ===
==== Airport ====
The La Crosse Regional Airport (KLSE), located on French Island, provides direct scheduled passenger service to Chicago through American Airlines regional carrier Air Wisconsin. Sun Country and Xtra Airways provide charter service to Laughlin, Elko, Nevada, and other destinations. The airport also serves general aviation for the La Crosse region.

==== Roads ====
The city is served by several major highways and Interstate, including Interstate 90, U.S. Highway 14, U.S. Highway 53, U.S. Highway 61, Wisconsin State Highway 35, Wisconsin State Highway 16, and Wisconsin State Highway 33.

The Mississippi River Bridge, also known as the Cass St. bridge and the newer Cameron Street bridge (photo with blue arch) both connect downtown La Crosse with La Crescent, Minnesota. These two bridges cross the Mississippi River, as does the Interstate 90 bridge located just northwest of La Crosse, connecting Wisconsin and Minnesota.

==== Walking and cycling ====
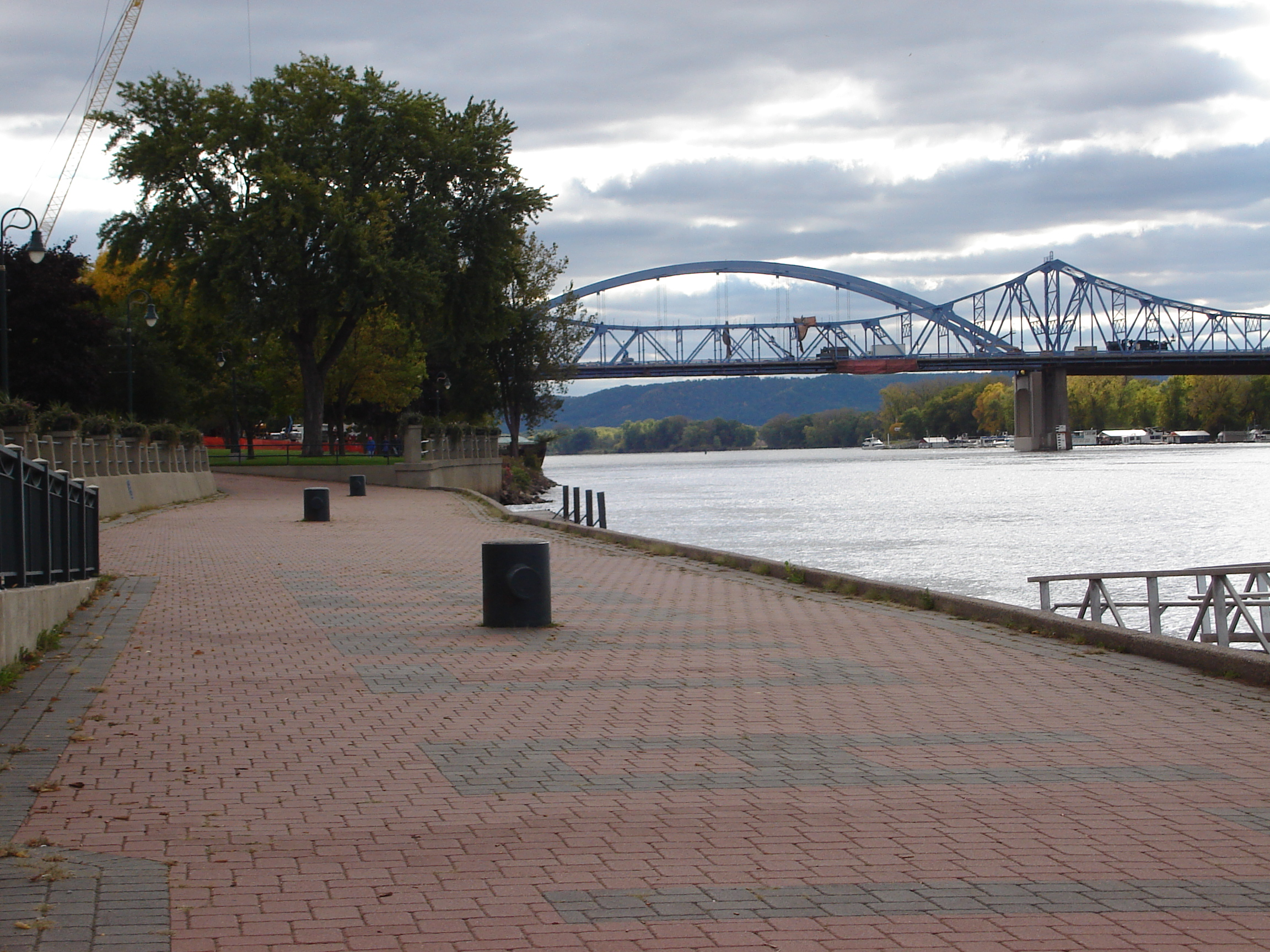
Cass St. and Cameron Ave. Bridges, which both cross the Mississippi River, from Riverside Park in downtown La Crosse

In 2012, the City of La Crosse was the first city in Wisconsin to pass a Green Complete Streets ordinance. This ordinance requires that when roads are reconstructed the needs of stormwater management and the safety of bicycles and pedestrians are taken into account in the new design. The same year, the city passed the Bicycle and Pedestrian Master Plan to guide improvements to the transportation network for those walking or cycling in the city.

By 2018, La Crosse had 7.7 miles (12.4 km) of on-street bike lanes, 17.1 miles (27.5 km) of paved bike paths, and 12 miles (19 km) of unpaved paths. As of 2021, however, La Crosse had no protected bike lanes, while bike infrastructure has generally gone unmaintained through the winter months.

A new bikeshare system debuted in downtown La Crosse in April 2021 through a partnership of La Crosse Neighborhoods, Inc and Koloni, an Iowa based bikeshare company. It is hoped that this service will be expanded across the city in the near future. The system has grown each year from 8 bikeshare stations and 40 bikes available for use in 2021, to 10 stations and 50 bikes in 2022 and to 15 stations and 75 bikes in 2023.

The interstate Mississippi River Trail passes through La Crosse. However, the trail does not follow a dedicated multi-use path. The La Crosse River Trail and the Great River State Trail pass through the northern edge of the city. These trails combine to form one continuous trail from Trempealeau to Reedsburg. They are rail trails built on the former roadbed of the Chicago and Northwestern Railway.

==== Public transit ====
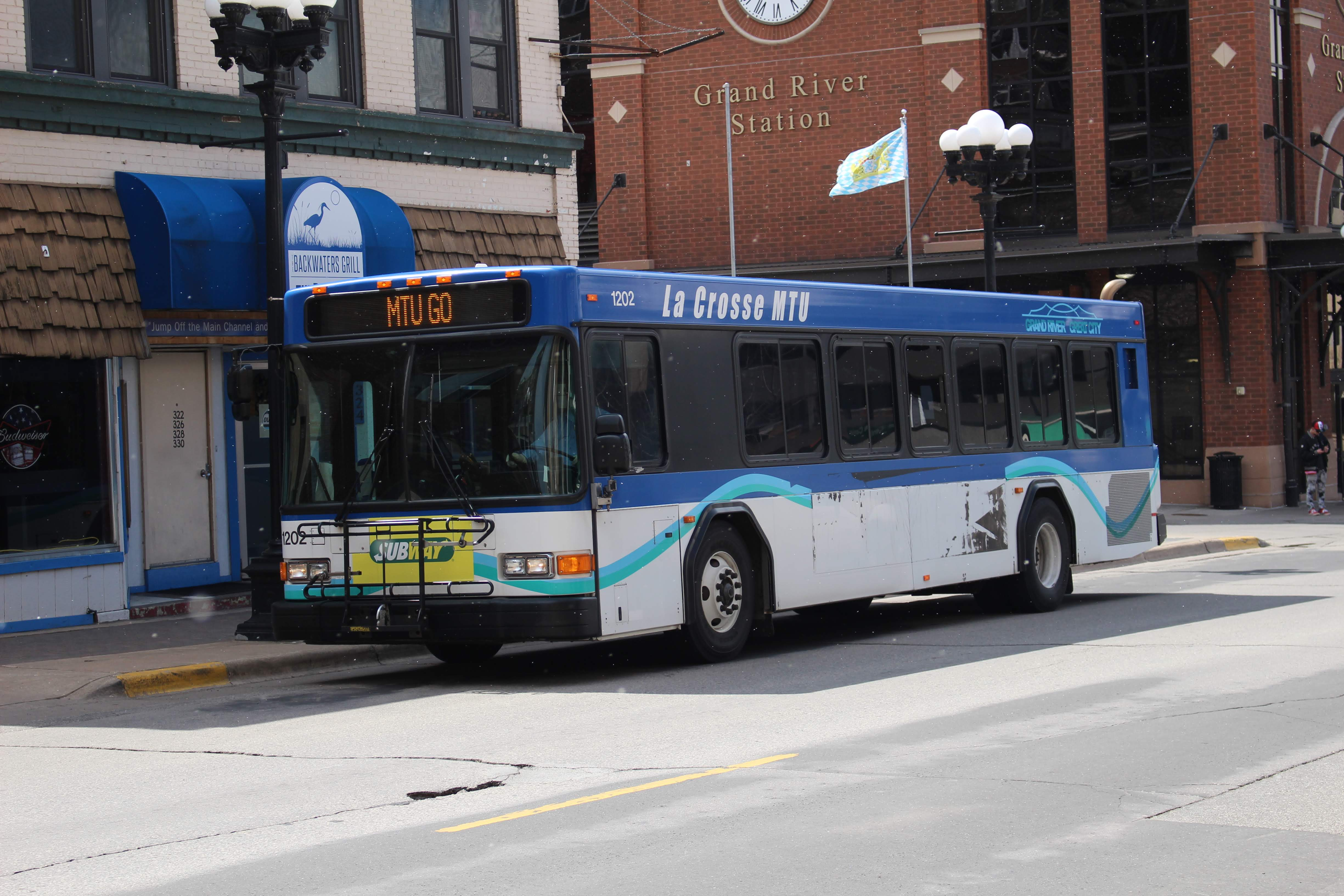
La Crosse Municipal Transit Utility bus in 2020

Public transit in La Crosse began with the opening of a horse-drawn streetcar line in 1878. Over time, more streetcar lines were added, and by 1893, all streetcars had been electrified. Beginning in the early 20th century, however, increasing car ownership led to a decline of the privately run streetcar system. As a result, buses began to replace streetcars throughout the city. By November 1945, the last streetcar line closed. The City of La Crosse took over operations of the buses in the 1970s from the Mississippi Valley Public Service Company, as the buses could no longer be operated profitably.

In 1945, in the first timetable after streetcar service had ended, there were four bus routes. The earliest bus left at 5:40 am and the last bus returned at 1:00 am. Buses ran at a 10 to 15-minute headway throughout the day. In total, the buses provided 1519.95 hours of service per week. Today, in 2021, the MTU provides only 1141.6 hours of service per week, a decline of 24.89%.

The La Crosse Municipal Transit Utility bus service, with routes reaching out to the suburbs, served over one million users in 2007. As of 2021, the MTU operates 11 routes with the earliest buses beginning their routes at 5:12 am and running until 10:40 pm at the latest.

In addition to the MTU, a regional bus service, Scenic Mississippi Regional Transit, provides service to Prairie du Chien, Viroqua, Tomah, and points in-between. The service has four routes, which only run on weekdays.

==== Railroads ====
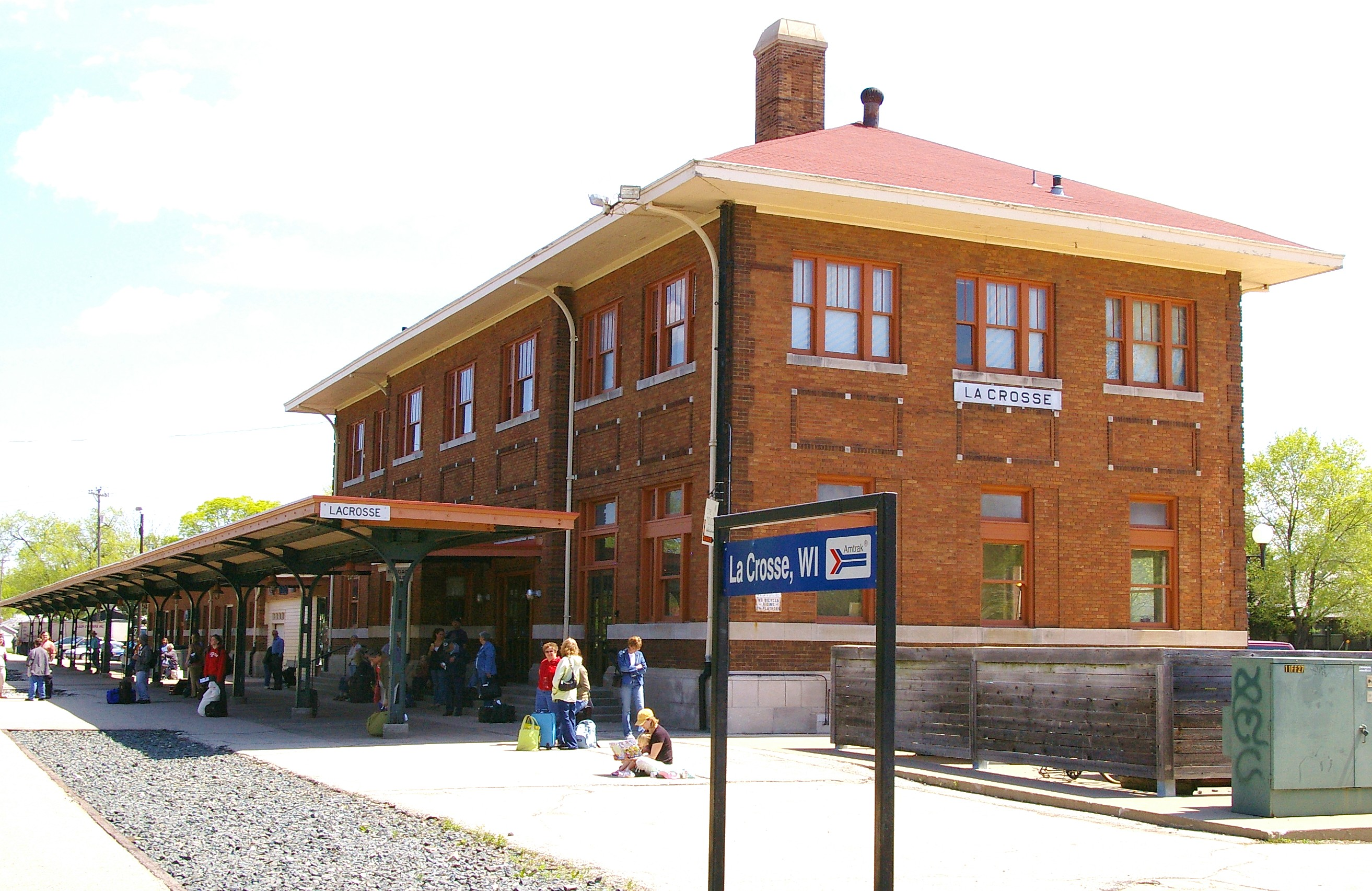
Amtrak station in La Crosse

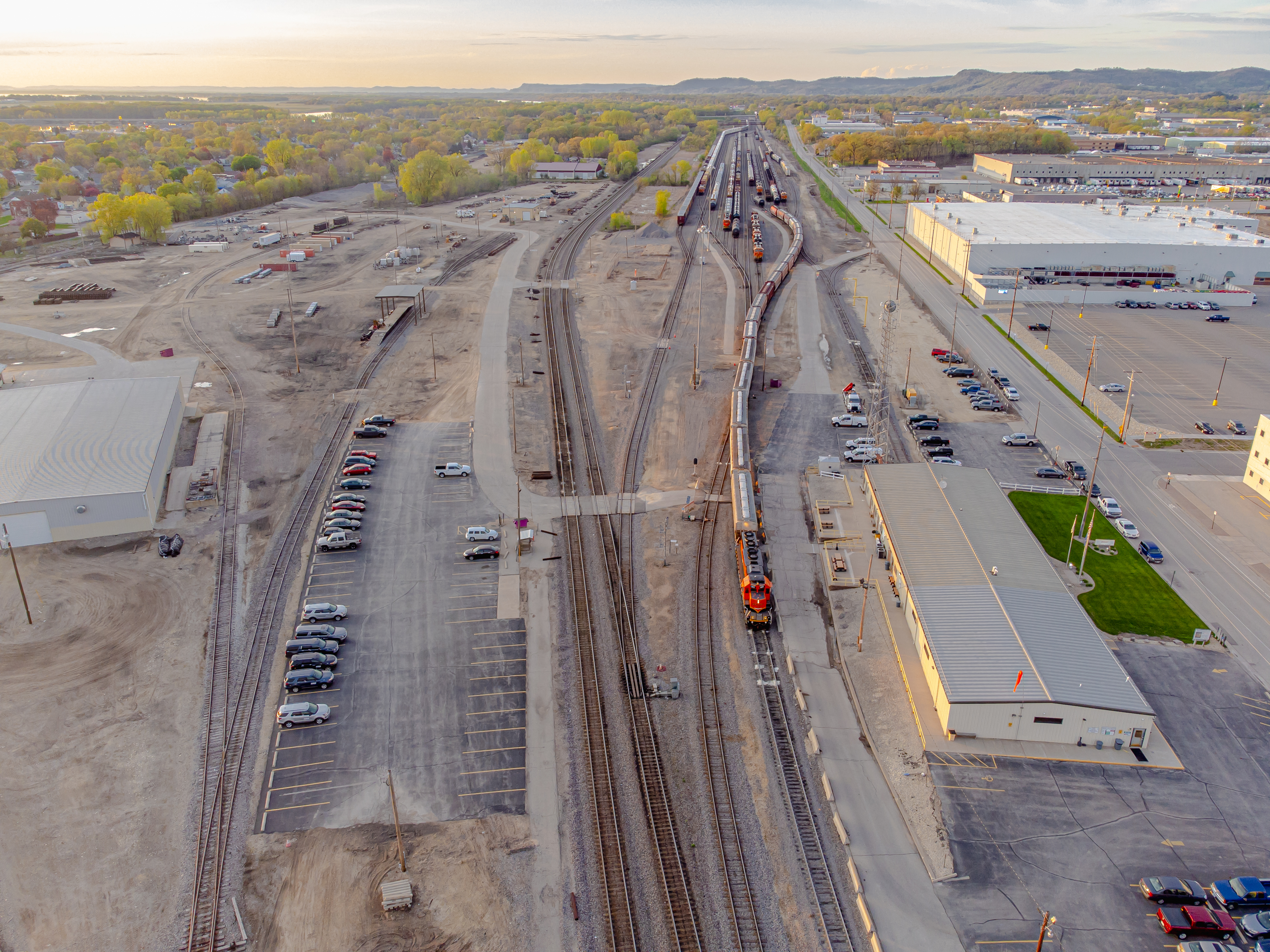
La Crosse BNSF rail yard

The first rail line to reach La Crosse arrived in 1858 from Milwaukee constructed by the Milwaukee & La Crosse Railroad. This later became the main line of the Milwaukee Road. After the Milwaukee Road went bankrupt it became part of the Soo Line Railroad in 1985 and later came under the control of Canadian Pacific Railway. This is still the area's primary rail right-of-way, providing both freight and passenger service.

Today, Amtrak serves the La Crosse station with four departures daily. The cross-country Empire Builder between Chicago and Seattle/Portland stops once daily in each direction. In May 2024, the station added a second daily round-trip with the debut of Amtrak's Borealis route. The Borealis serves the same stations as the Empire Builder along the old Milwaukee Road, but only the more-traveled portion between Chicago and Saint Paul, Minnesota via Milwaukee, La Crosse, and Winona, Minnesota.

Railroad tracks owned by Burlington Northern and Santa Fe Railway (BNSF) pass through La Crosse providing freight service. These were originally built by the Chicago, Burlington & Quincy Railroad in 1886 to connect Chicago to the Twin Cities following the east bank of the Mississippi River. This line provided passenger service as well up until May 1, 1971, when Amtrak took over intercity passenger rail operations.

==== Intercity bus ====
Jefferson Lines serves La Crosse with one daily bus each way running between Minneapolis and Milwaukee via Rochester and Madison. In addition, Badger Bus offers service on Fridays and Sundays during the school year between Madison and Minneapolis via La Crosse. Both Jefferson Lines and Badger Bus make stops at the University of Wisconsin–La Crosse Student Union, while Jefferson Lines also stops at the downtown Grand River Station transit hub.

==== Waterways ====
On the Mississippi River, cargo is transported to and from this area to St Paul and St Louis, using towboats, primarily moving dry bulk cargo barges for coal, grain, and other low-value bulk goods.

Lock and Dam No. 7 on the Mississippi River is located approximately 4.5 miles (7.2 km) upstream from Downtown La Crosse.

=== Utilities ===
La Crosse's tap drinking water, which is raised from a deep underground Artesian aquifer, won the best natural tasting water award in September 2007 in a statewide tasting competition hosted by the Wisconsin Water Association. The city competed against groundwater and surface water utilities from Algoma, Appleton, Green Bay, Madison, Milwaukee, Pell Lake, Shawano, Shawano Lake and Watertown at the annual meeting of the association. La Crosse's drinking water is pumped from deep ground wells to a distribution center and is treated with chlorine and fluoride; some wells are also treated with polyphosphate.

In recent years, the city discovered PFAS in the groundwater on French Island, WI as a result of fire fighting foam used at the La Crosse Regional Airport. This has led to the closure of two municipal wells, as well as prevented residents of parts of the Town of Campbell, WI from safely using their private wells. Over 500 wells on French Island have been contaminated and the State of Wisconsin has supplied bottled water to the affected residents.

=== Healthcare ===
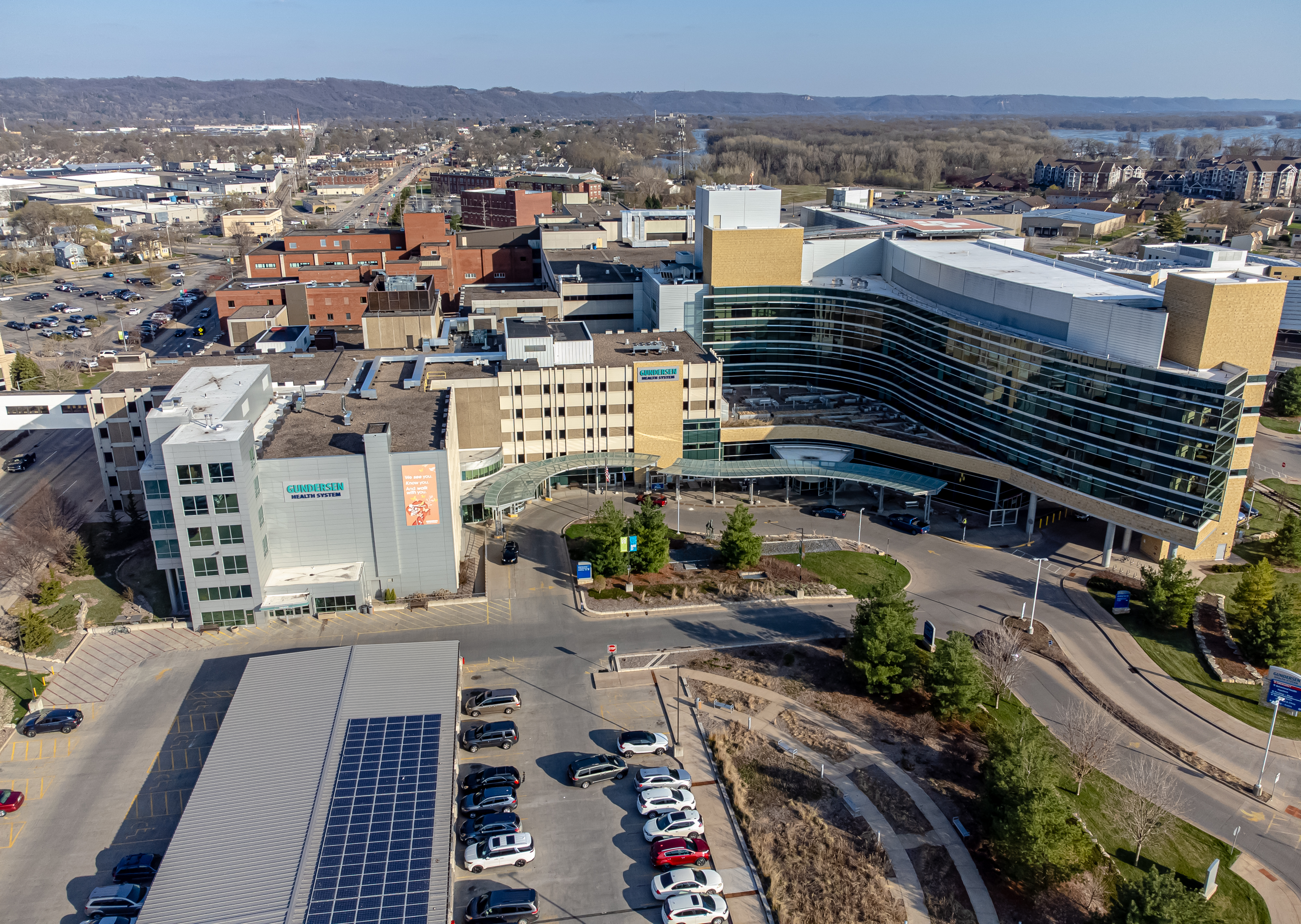
Gundersen Health System

Two major regional healthcare facilities are located in La Crosse: Gundersen Health System and the Franciscan Skemp Medical Center.

Gundersen Health System is a nationally ranked health care system located in La Crosse that is also an ACS nationally certified Level II Trauma Center. It is the primary hospital associated with the Gundersen Clinic medical group and the location of the Western campus for the University of Wisconsin Medical School. With its main campus located in La Crosse, the system also manages 23 locations throughout Wisconsin, Minnesota and Iowa with nearly 6,000 employees. In 2014, Gundersen Health received the Healthgrades America's 50 Best Hospitals™ designation, placing the system among the top 1 percent of hospitals nationwide.

The Franciscan Skemp Medical Center is an affiliate of the Mayo Clinic. Franciscan Skemp, which was the first western Wisconsin hospital to open its doors in 1883 as St. Francis Hospital, was started by the Catholic Franciscan Sisters of Perpetual Adoration, who still are associated with the medical center. In 1995, Franciscan Skemp merged with Mayo Clinic Health Systems in Rochester, Minnesota, located 60 miles away. A new trauma and emergency department, helicopter pad, and surgery wing recently opened in 2007.

The Health Science Center, located on the University of Wisconsin–La Crosse campus, is a combined effort of both medical centers, UW–La Crosse, Viterbo University, Western College, the School District of La Crosse, and various government educational groups. The purpose was to prepare and train students for advancement in the medical field.

== Sister cities ==
La Crosse has sister city relationships with seven foreign towns and cities:

- Bantry, County Cork, Ireland
- Dubna, Moscow Oblast, Russia
- Épinal, Vosges, Grand Est, France
- Friedberg, Bavaria, Germany
- Førde, Norway
- Junglinster, Luxembourg
- Kumbo, Cameroon
- Luoyang, Henan, China

== See also ==
- La Crosse area radio stations
- La Crosse area television stations
- List of sundown towns in the United States
- Old Style Beer

== Bibliography ==
- Crocker, Leslie F. Places and Spaces: A Century of Public Buildings, Bridges and Parks in La Crosse, Wisconsin. La Crosse, Wis. 2012.
- Marcou, David J. (ed.) Spirit of La Crosse: A Grassroots History. La Crosse, Wis.: Western Wisconsin Technical College, 2000.
- Morser, Eric J. Hinterland Dreams: The Political Economy of a Midwestern City. Philadelphia: University of Pennsylvania Press, 2011.
