= WKLJ =

- Sparta, Wisconsin; United States
- Broadcast area: La Crosse, Wisconsin
- Frequency: 1290 kHz
- Branding: ESPN Radio 1290

Programming
- Format: Sports
- Affiliations: ESPN Radio

Ownership
- Owner: Sparta-Tomah Broadcasting Co., Inc.
- Sister stations: WFBZ, WCOW-FM

History
- First air date: 1951 (as WCOW)
- Former call signs: WCOW (1951–1992)

Technical information
- Licensing authority: FCC
- Facility ID: 61681
- Class: D
- Power: 5,000 watts day 59 watts night
- Transmitter coordinates: 43°58′6.00″N 90°51′35.00″W
- Translator: 102.1 W271CM (Sparta)

Links
- Public license information: Public file; LMS
- Webcast: Listen Live
- Website: espnlacrosse.com

WKLJ (1290 AM) is a radio station broadcasting a sports format. The station had previously run CNN news and prior to that, had simulcasted their FM sister station, WCOW-FM for many years. Licensed to Sparta, Wisconsin, United States, the station serves the La Crosse area. The station is owned by Sparta-Tomah Broadcasting Co., Inc. and features programming from ESPN Radio. It previously held the callsign WCOW from its inception until 1992.

== FM Translator ==
WKLJ programming is relayed to an FM translator in order to widen the coverage area, especially during nighttime hours; the translator also affords the listener the ability to listen on FM.

Broadcast translator for WKLJ
Call sign	Frequency	City of license	FID	ERP (W)	Class	FCC info
W271CM	102.1 FM	Sparta, Wisconsin	56618	250	D	LMS
