= La Crosse Technology =

Multinational electrical product company

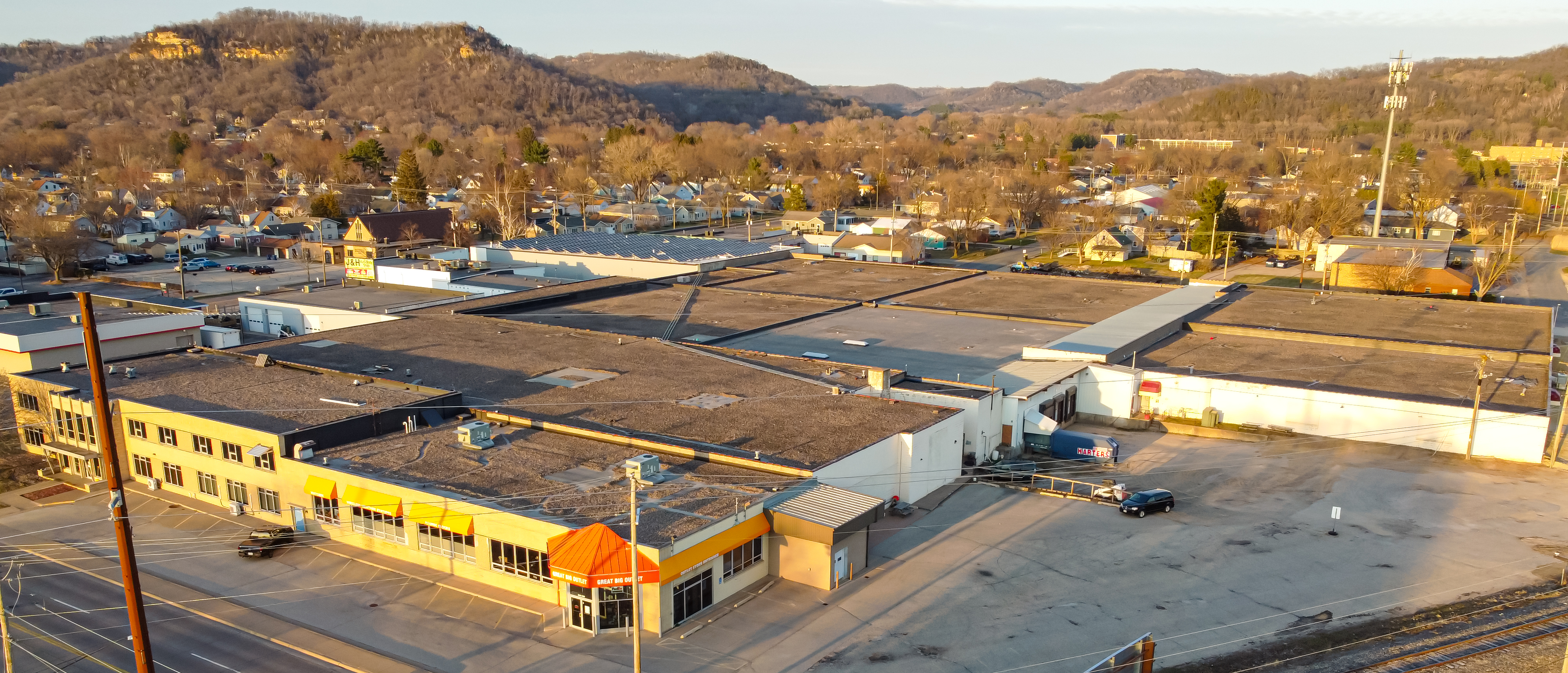
- Headquarters in La Crosse
- Founded: 1985, La Crescent, Minnesota
- Headquarters: La Crosse, Wisconsin, United States
- Key people: Allan McCormick, Owner
- Products: weather stations, clocks, battery chargers
- Number of employees: 100
- Website: http://www.lacrossetechnology.com/

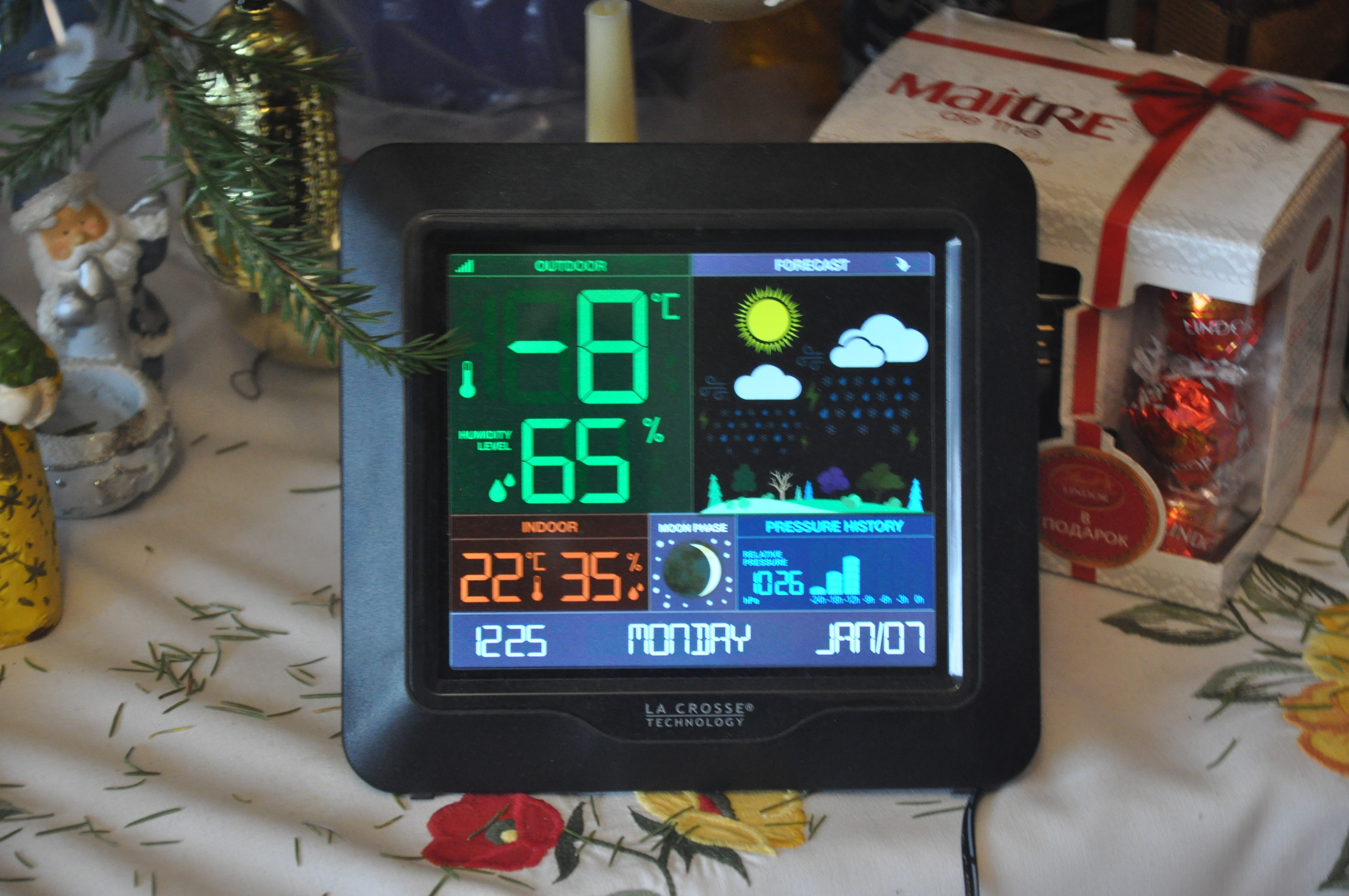
Newest La Crosse Technology Home Weather Station with color display and external radio sensor.

La Crosse Technology is a multinational manufacturer of electronic products including weather stations, radio-controlled clocks, watches and battery chargers. The company was started in 1985 in La Crescent, Minnesota and is now located in La Crosse, Wisconsin.

== History ==
La Crosse Technology was founded in 1983 as a grandfather clock distribution company after the founder, Allan McCormick, returned from being stationed in Germany.

La Crosse Technology introduced the radio-controlled clock, commonly (but incorrectly) called an "atomic clock" after the extremely accurate timepiece behind the radio signal it uses as a reference, into the United States commercial market in 1991.

In 2004, the company was awarded a license to sell The Weather Channel branded weather stations.

In 2008, the company introduced the first Internet powered home weather station.
