= WCOW-FM =

- Sparta, Wisconsin; United States
- Broadcast area: Tomah-La Crosse, Wisconsin
- Frequency: 97.1 MHz
- Branding: "Cow 97"

Programming
- Language: English
- Format: Country
- Affiliations: Packers Radio Network

Ownership
- Owner: Sparta-Tomah Broadcasting Co., Inc.
- Sister stations: WFBZ, WKLJ

History
- Call sign meaning: Cow

Technical information
- Licensing authority: FCC
- Facility ID: 61682
- Class: C1
- ERP: 100,000 watts
- HAAT: 179 m (587 ft)
- Transmitter coordinates: 43°58′6.00″N 90°51′35.00″W

Links
- Public license information: Public file; LMS
- Webcast: Listen Live
- Website: cow97.com

WCOW-FM (97.1 MHz, "Cow 97") is a country music radio station licensed to Sparta, Wisconsin that serves Mid-western Wisconsin and the La Crosse and La Crescent communities on the nearby Mississippi River separating Minnesota and Wisconsin. WCOW-FM also simulcasted for many years on their sister station at 1290 AM when it too had the WCOW calls. The WCOW call sign has previously been used by other broadcasters, including a station that existed from 1951 to 1957 in Minneapolis-St. Paul before being renamed as WISK.
