= St. Elias Antiochian Orthodox Church (La Crosse, Wisconsin) =

Church building in United States of America

Coordinates: 43°50′06.7″N 91°14′57.4″W

St. Elias Antiochian Orthodox Church is a church of the Antiochian Orthodox Christian Archdiocese of North America located in La Crosse, Wisconsin. It is part of the Diocese of Toledo and the Midwest. The church was founded by Syrian and Lebanese immigrants and named in honor of the Hebrew Prophet Elijah. St. Elias Antiochian Orthodox Church is one of the oldest churches in La Crosse.
