= Providence Academy (La Crosse, Wisconsin) =

Coordinates: 43°50′20″N 91°14′45″W

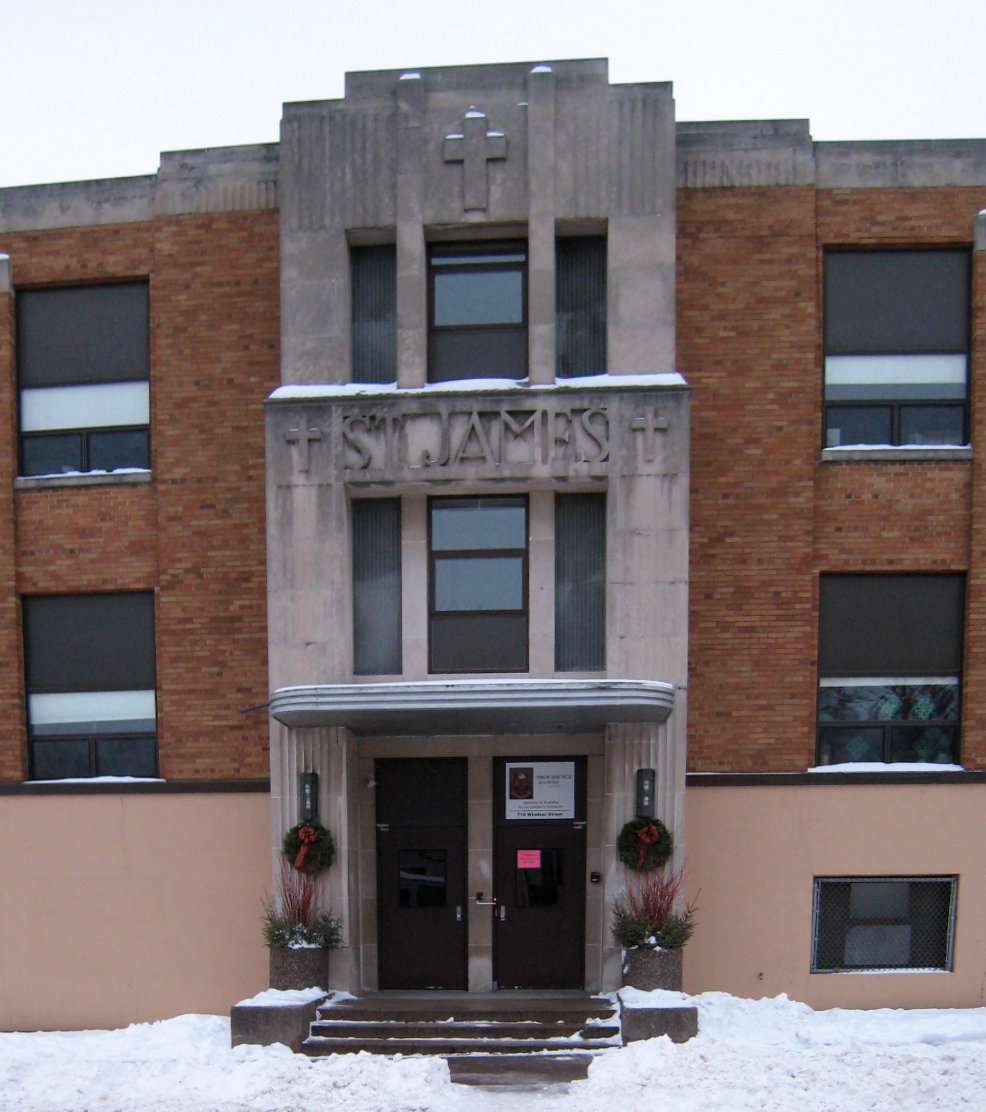

Information
- Religious affiliation: Catholicism
- Established: 2005; 21 years ago
- Grades: Pre-Kindergarten - Grade 12
- Website: www.providencelacrosse.org

Providence Academy is a Catholic school located in La Crosse, Wisconsin. Founded in 2005 by a group of local parents in the Coulee Region, the school provides a Pre-K through 12th grade education with an emphasis on the classical liberal arts, moral virtue, and Catholic spiritual formation. It graduated its first high school student in 2007.

As a member of the National Association of Private Catholic and Independent Schools (NAPCIS), Providence Academy attempts to integrate faith, reason, and tradition into student life and academics.
