= KFSI =

Coordinates: 44.024°N 92.544°W

- Rochester, Minnesota; United States
- Broadcast area: Rochester, Minnesota
- Frequency: 92.9 MHz
- Branding: 92.9 KFSI

Programming
- Format: Christian radio

Ownership
- Owner: Faith Sound Incorporated

History
- First air date: April 28, 1981
- Former frequencies: 88.5 MHz (1981–1992)
- Call sign meaning: Faith Sound Incorporated

Technical information
- Licensing authority: FCC
- Facility ID: 20569
- Class: KFSI: A K203BR: D W206BA: D K220EP: D K268AF: D
- ERP: KFSI: 6,000 watts K203BR: 62 watts W206BA: 250 watts K220EP: 10 watts K268AF: 200 watts
- HAAT: 97 m (318 ft)
- Translators: 88.5 K203BR (Winona, MN); 89.1 W206BA (Alma, WI); 91.9 K220EP (La Crescent, MN); 92.5 K223AH (Peterson, MN); 101.5 K268AF (Decorah, IA)

Links
- Public license information: Public file; LMS
- Webcast: Listen Live
- Website: kfsi.org

KFSI (92.9 FM) is a Christian radio station in Rochester, Minnesota.

== History ==
KFSI went on the air on April 28, 1981, by the Rev. Ray Logan. The station plays contemporary Christian music as well as some teaching programs. This station was originally heard on 88.5 MHz, but moved to 92.9 on November 14, 1992, because they were causing interference with local television station, KAAL from Austin. The KFSI broadcast tower is located west of Rochester.
