= WLCW =

Contemporary Christian radio station in West Salem–La Crosse, Wisconsin

- West Salem, Wisconsin; United States
- Broadcast area: La Crosse
- Frequency: 100.1 MHz
- Branding: K-Love

Programming
- Format: Contemporary Christian
- Network: K-Love

Ownership
- Owner: Educational Media Foundation

History
- First air date: 1982 (as WISQ)
- Former call signs: WISQ (1981–1986); WQJY-FM (1986–1987); WQJY (1987–1997); WKBH-FM (1997–2020)

Technical information
- Licensing authority: FCC
- Facility ID: 17040
- Class: A
- ERP: 3,600 watts; 100,000 watts (w/beam tilt)
- HAAT: 130 m (427 ft)
- Transmitter coordinates: 43°51′1.8″N 91°12′8.4″W

Links
- Public license information: Public file; LMS
- Webcast: Listen Live
- Website: www.klove.com

WLCW (100.1 FM) is a radio station broadcasting a contemporary Christian format. Licensed to West Salem, Wisconsin, United States, the station serves the La Crosse area. The station is owned by Educational Media Foundation.

== History ==
The station was assigned the call letters WISQ on April 7, 1981. On October 26, 1986, the station changed its call sign to WQJY-FM; on March 26, 1987 to WQJY; and on New Year’s Day 1997 to WKBH-FM.

On June 3, 2020, Mississippi Valley Broadcasters sold off its entire La Crosse cluster of stations in three separate sales; as part of the sales, WKBH-FM was sold to the Educational Media Foundation, marking the Christian music-focused company's entry into the La Crosse market. The sale was consummated on July 31, 2020 at a price of $400,000, at which point the station changed its call sign to WLCW. On August 1, 2020, WLCW’s format changed from classic rock to EMF's K-Love contemporary Christian format.

== The Classic K-Rock years ==
In 1992, former owner Pat Delaney and Van Halen Fan/General Manager Tim 'T.S.' Scott began broadcasting ABC Radio's Satellite Classic Rock Service at WKBH's previous frequency of 105.5 MHz. Feeling that they needed a local presence in the morning, the "Marshall Stax Show" soon debuted. Perhaps feeling completely humiliated by the name Marshall Stax (given to him by Scott), or possibly due to dumpy conditions at the old K-Rock studios in Holmen, Wisconsin, Stax quickly departed for Madison. Deciding that K-Rock needed a big city attitude, Scott brought in Jim Dixon, a veteran of the Columbus, Ohio and Orlando and Tampa Bay, Florida markets. In keeping with the theme of giving his morning men bad '80s' hair metal-sounding names, Scott deemed that Dixon would from then on be known as "Diamond Jim."

In January 1993, "The Dawn Patrol with Diamond Jim" made its debut. Teamed up with co-host Thomie Storm, Dixon soon became the most controversial radio personality that La Crosse and Winona listeners had ever heard. His honest, blunt, yet humorous approach to everyday subject matter had a unique way of polarizing his audience, such as with this incident shortly after his arrival.

In addition to bringing a personality-driven morning show to the airwaves, Dixon was also appointed the station's promotions director, and he wasted little time in getting to work. Despite having practically no budget Dixon decided on a guerrilla campaign against other stations in the market. He quickly set his sights on WLFN FM, also known as Magic 105. Magic 105 had decided that it would give away a new house during the spring of 1993 Arbitron rating period. While Magic 105 ran commercials and promos offering a chance at a new house, K-Rock countered with a campaign accusing Magic of trying to lure listeners to their 'crappy' station with an unrealistic promise of winning a house. "If it's crap you want, we'll give you the whole crapper" announced the K-Rock promos, and the station began appearing at the Magic 105 events with the 'K-Rock Outhouse' being towed by the station van. Dixon even convinced LaCrosse Mayor Patrick Zielke to do the official ribbon cutting for the outhouse! In the end, the promotion completely backfired on WLFN FM, as the station finished near the bottom of the Spring ratings. This would ultimately fuel the intense hatred Smith had for Dixon, that would come into play in later years. Later that year, K-Rock presented its first 'Listener Appreciation Concert' featuring Starship at The La Crosse Center. Despite the fact that Starship - hardly a rock act - and not on the playlist for Classic Rock 100.1 as the station is known today, the concert drew nearly 4,000 fans.

Over the next couple of years, Dixon worked with a revolving cast of partners. Following Storm's departure, Tim Larkin and Ray 'Stingray' Scott both spent time in the sidekick chair. "The Dawn Patrol" also featured a stable of characters and bits including 'Young Vulcan Spock', Bradford Quinton Bradford's 'Politically Incorrect Playhouse,' and the popular contest 'Famous Last Words,' featuring graphic re-creations of celebrity deaths on their respective anniversaries. Listeners were also treated to daily editions of 'Mr. Manly,' Collum Keating's syndicated bit, as well as 'Jimmy D. The Sports Philosopher,' written and voiced by a then-unknown Jimmy Kimmel. During the same period, K-Rock was also strengthening its hold on the rock audience, first by adding "Pirate Radio with Lonn Friend," a syndicated Saturday Night Active Rock program, and later, "Gonzo Radio, Saturday Night," a localized version after "Pirate.." went defunct.

The station was an affiliate of the syndicated Pink Floyd program "Floydian Slip".
