= WFBZ =

Sports radio station in Trempealeau–La Crosse, Wisconsin

- Trempealeau, Wisconsin; United States
- Broadcast area: La Crosse, Wisconsin
- Frequency: 105.5 MHz
- Branding: 105.5 ESPN

Programming
- Format: Sports
- Affiliations: ESPN Radio; Wisconsin Badgers; Wisconsin Interscholastic Athletic Association

Ownership
- Owner: Sparta-Tomah Broadcasting Co., Inc.
- Sister stations: WKLJ, WCOW-FM

History
- First air date: November 24, 1984 (as WKDL)
- Former call signs: WKDL (1984–1986); WKBH-FM (1986–1997)

Technical information
- Licensing authority: FCC
- Facility ID: 56616
- Class: A
- ERP: 2,100 watts
- HAAT: 162 m (531 ft)
- Transmitter coordinates: 43°56′33.00″N 91°26′3.00″W

Links
- Public license information: Public file; LMS
- Webcast: Listen Live
- Website: espnlacrosse.com

WFBZ (105.5 FM, "105.5 ESPN") is a radio station broadcasting a sports format. Licensed to Trempealeau, Wisconsin, United States, the station serves the La Crosse area. The station is owned by Sparta-Tomah Broadcasting Co., Inc. and features programming from ESPN Radio.

== History ==
The station was assigned the call letters WKDL on July 11, 1984. On October 1, 1986, the station changed its call sign to WKBH-FM, and on New Year's Day 1997, to the current WFBZ.

In the late 1990s a hybrid format consisted of ABC Radio's Satellite Music Network "Classic Rock" during the day, and ABC's "Z-Rock" at night.

The station launched a fulltime alternative rock format in 1997 which continued until November 1, 2001.

From 1999 until the format's demise the advertising sales function was performed under a Local Marketing Agreement (LMA) by Mississippi Valley Communications, Inc., licensee of WQCC, WLXR, and WLFN. Rochester, MN, based Faith Sound, Inc., which operated translator K220EP at La Crescent until 2024, had agreed to purchase the assets, but the deal fell through. A simulcast with sister station WKBH, then clearing ESPN Radio, began at that date. Later the station would be sold to an ownership group made of workers at Mississippi Valley Communications, but after clarification of the FCC ownership caps it was spun off to Sparta-Tomah Broadcasting Co., Inc.
