= Moisture cure polyurethane =

Moisture-cure polyurethanes -- or polyurethane prepolymer -- are isocyanate-terminated prepolymers that are formulated to cure with ambient water. Cured PURs are segmented copolymer polyurethane-ureas exhibiting microphase-separated morphologies. One phase is derived from a typically flexible (subambient glass transition temperature, T_{g}) polyol that is generally referred to as the “soft phase”. Likewise the corresponding “hard phase” is born from the di- or polyisocyanates that through water reaction produce a highly crosslinked material with softening temperature well above room temperature.

== Application ==
Moisture cure polyurethanes have been widely used in the adhesive and coating industries. Thermal, mechanical, and surface properties of hyperbranched polyurethane-urea (HBPU) moisture cured coatings have been studied in relationship to chemical structure. Different NCO terminated HBPU prepolymers were prepared by reacting hyperbranched polymers with isophorone diisocyanate (IPDI) or 4,4'-bis-methylene cyclohexane diisocyanate (HMDI). A range of NCO/OH eq. ratios from 1.2 - 1.6 was used.

Thermal and mechanical properties of moisture cured polyurethane-urea /clay nanocomposite coatings have been studied in relationship to clay dispersion and intercalation of clay platelets in the urethane-urea matrix. Coatings were prepared by moisture curing of IPDI capped hydroxyl terminated polybutadiene/clay dispersions in a relative humidity (RH) of 50% at 25 °C. Moisture cured polyurethane–urea coatings have been made by reacting 1,2,3-triazole rich polyether polyols with HMDI at NCO/OH eq. ratio of 1.2 to obtain isocyanate-terminated polyurethane prepolymers. The prepolymers were cured under atmospheric moisture to make polyurethane–urea free films. Actually, due to the poor mechanical properties caused by the curing method, the MCPU's application is limited. But it is possible to enhance the strength by introducing multiple hydrogen bonds and changing the microphase separation structure.
