= Marine Credit Union =

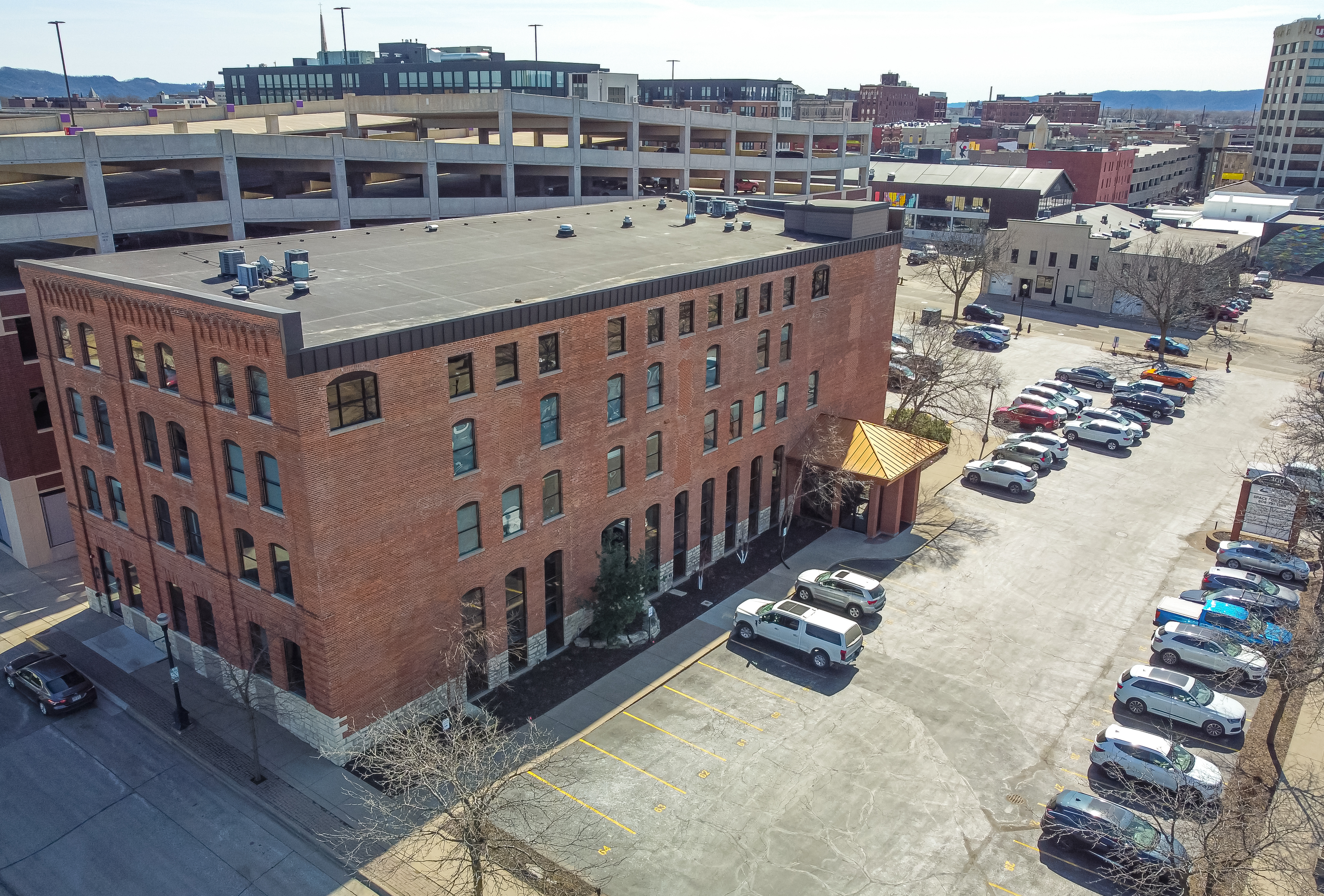
- Headquarters in La Crosse
- Type: Credit union
- Industry: Financial services
- Founded: 1949
- Headquarters: La Crosse, Wisconsin, United States
- Services: Full service banking
- Total assets: $1,000,000,000
- Website: www.marinecu.com

Marine Credit Union is a member-owned financial cooperative headquartered in La Crosse, Wisconsin, which serves more than 70,000 members across Wisconsin, Iowa and Minnesota.

Marine Credit Union was founded in 1949 as a credit union in Fond du Lac, Wisconsin for the employees of Mercury Marine, and has since merged with or acquired over thirty financial institutions. In 2017, the credit union notably acquired five Bank Mutual branches, and in 2018 acquired ten Old National Bank branches. As of 2019, the credit union has more than 400 full-time employees.

== Marine Credit Union Foundation ==
The Marine Credit Union Foundation was formed in 2006 and is a non-profit 501(c)(3) organization. The foundation provides financial assistance and promotes financial literacy within member communities. Its Finding Home program helps financially challenged borrowers improve their credit and qualify to finance a house.
