= WKBH (AM) =

- Holmen, Wisconsin; United States
- Broadcast area: La Crosse County
- Frequency: 1570 kHz
- Branding: Relevant Radio

Programming
- Format: Catholic radio

Ownership
- Owner: Relevant Radio; (Relevant Radio, Inc.)

History
- First air date: 1984; 42 years ago

Technical information
- Licensing authority: FCC
- Facility ID: 56617
- Class: B
- Power: 1,000 watts day; 360 watts night
- Transmitter coordinates: 43°55′32.00″N 91°16′2.00″W
- Translator: 94.1 W231DL (Onalaska)

Links
- Public license information: Public file; LMS
- Webcast: Listen Live
- Website: relevantradio.com

WKBH (1570 AM) is a radio station broadcasting a Catholic talk radio format. Licensed to Holmen, Wisconsin, United States, the station serves the La Crosse area. WKBH is currently owned by station is owned by Relevant Radio, Inc.

WKBH began broadcasting in 1984.
