= Clyde Simpson =

American politician

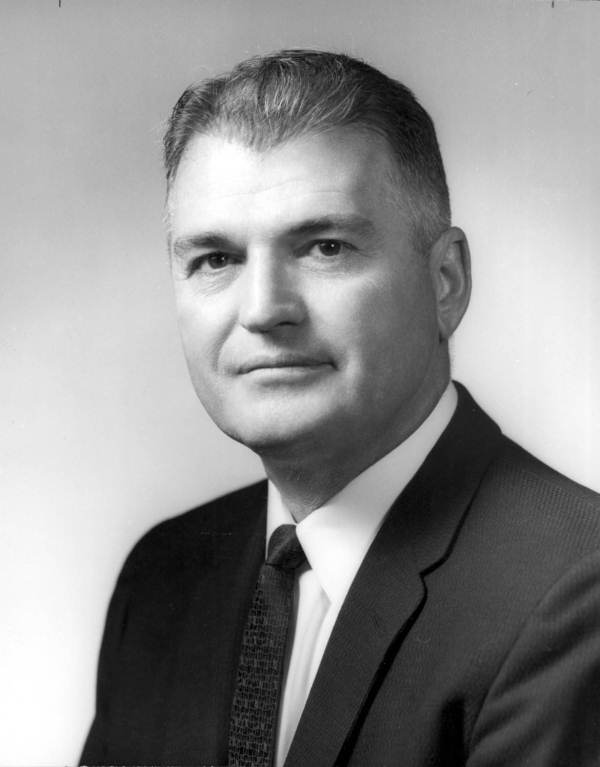
- Simpson in 1966

Member of the Florida House of Representatives from Duval County
- In office 1965–1966

Personal details
- Born: October 13, 1920 Jacksonville, Florida, U.S.
- Died: November 14, 1999 (aged 79)
- Party: Democratic
- Education: Gordon Military College; University of Florida

Clyde W. Simpson (October 13, 1920 – November 14, 1999) was an American politician. He served as a Democratic member of the Florida House of Representatives.

== Life and career ==
Simpson was born in Jacksonville, Florida on 13 October 1920. He would graduate from Robert E. Lee High School in Jacksonville in 1937. He attended Gordon Military College and the University of Florida, graduating in 1943, the University of Florida's Levin College of Law, graduating in 1973, and would receive an honorary degree from Jacksonville University.

Simpson would serve in the United States Navy during World War II, participating in the Pacific Theater. He would serve as a Lieutenant, junior grade, aboard the vessel PT-168 in 1944. Throughout 1946 and 1947, after leaving combat, Simpson would show signs of PTSD. He would be hospitalized and treated with electro-shock and insulin shock therapies. Simpson continued his service in the Navy Reserves for 25 years, ultimately retiring as a commander.

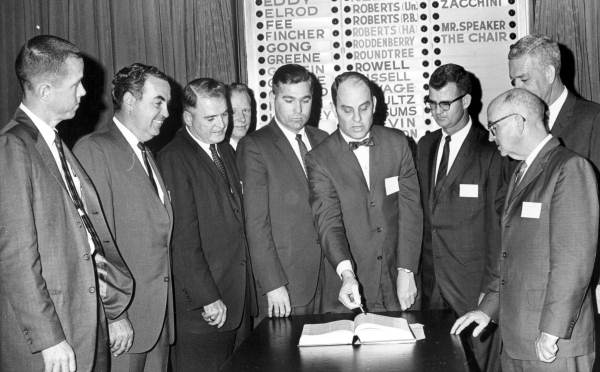
Simpson with Joel T. Daves III, Ralph Poston, Louis L. Huntley, Max Wilks, Ralph Turlington, Bernie Papy Jr., John J. Savage and Ernest Roddenberry, 1965

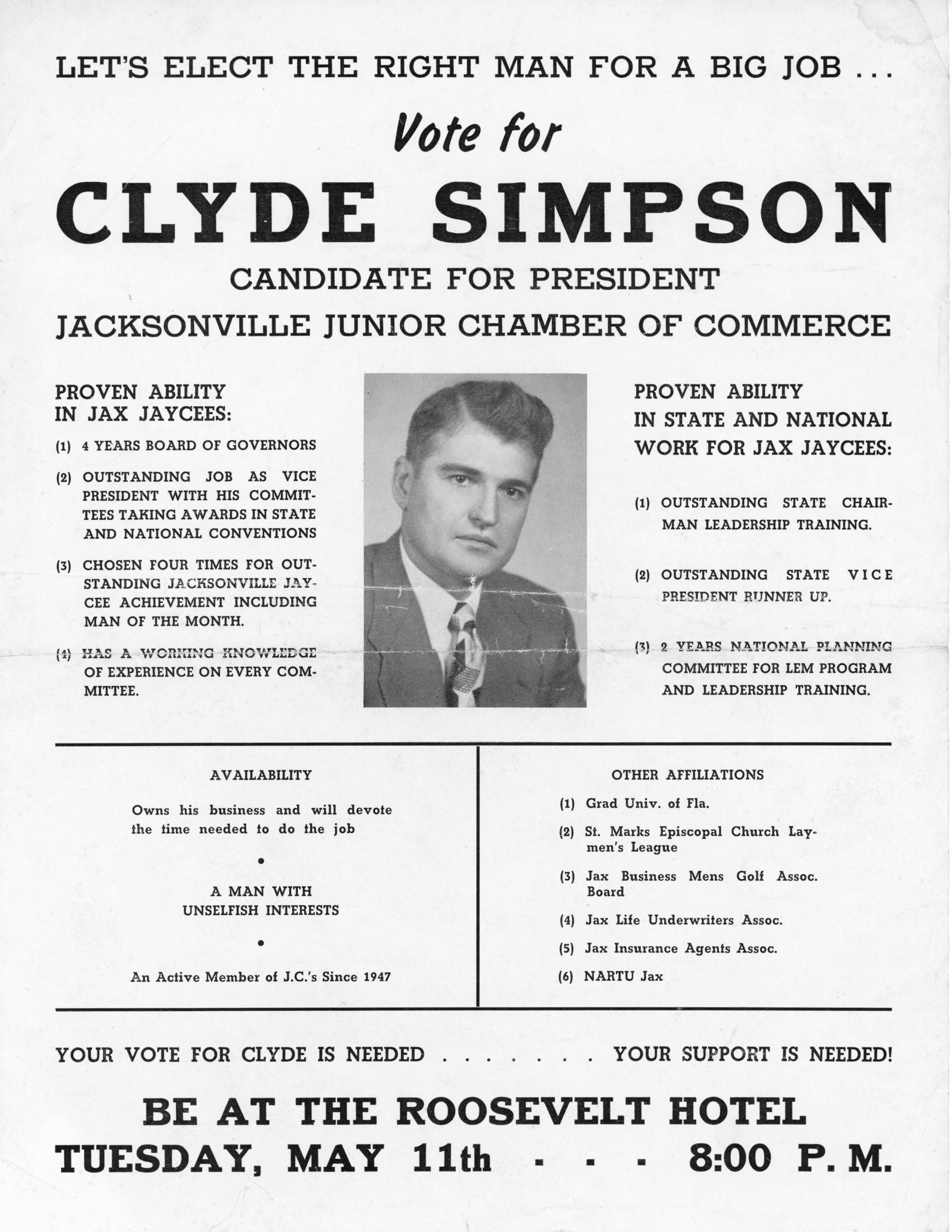
A Simpson campaign poster for President of the Jacksonville Junior Chamber of Commerce, 1954.

Simpson would work as a real estate and mortgage broker, including roles in life and general insurance, building products sales, home improvement construction, and advertising. Simpson served extensively with the Jacksonville Jaycees, serving as the State Vice President for District 3 from 1952 to 1953, and was elected as president of the Jacksonville Junior Chamber of Commerce in 1954. Simpson served two terms in the Florida House of Representatives from 1965 to 1966. He then served on the Jacksonville City Council from 1966 to 1969.

Simpson died in Belleair, Florida due to complications from Alzheimer's disease on November 14, 1999, at the age of 79.
