= Roger West =

Roger West may refer to:

- Roger West (North Carolina politician) (born 1948), member of the North Carolina House of Representatives
- Roger West (Florida politician) (born 1936), member of the Florida House of Representatives
- Roger Blake West (1928–1978), United States district judge
- Inspector Roger West, fictional character created by John Creasey
