= Dan Scarborough =

American politician (1933–2008)

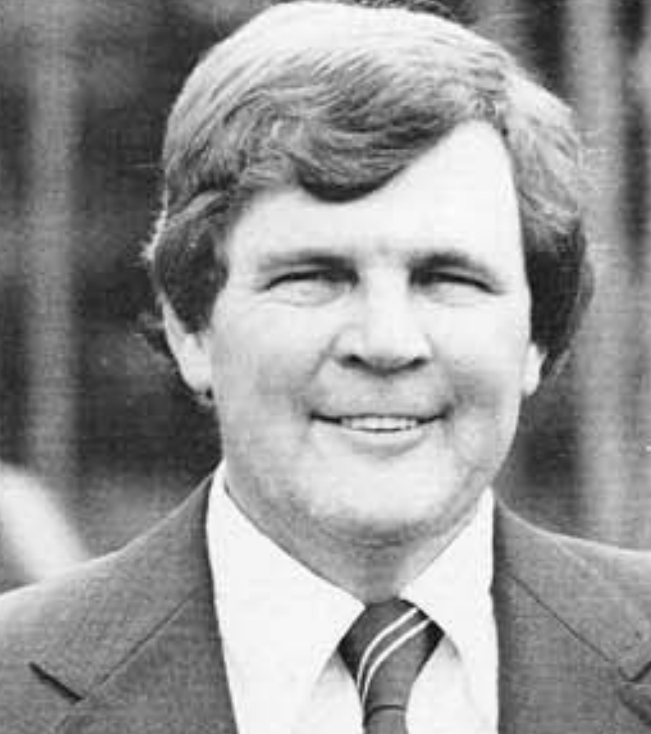

Member of the Florida Senate
- In office November 5, 1968 – November 4, 1980
- Preceded by: John Fisher
- Succeeded by: Dan Jenkins
- Constituency: 10th district (1968–1972); 7th district (1972–1980)

Member of the Florida House of Representatives
- In office November 8, 1966 – November 5, 1968
- Preceded by: Clyde Simpson
- Succeeded by: Roger West
- Constituency: Duval County Group 1 (1966–1967); 18th district (1967–1968)

Personal details
- Born: February 6, 1933 Hortense, Georgia
- Died: September 24, 2008 (aged 75) Jacksonville, Florida
- Party: Democratic
- Spouse: Virginia Zipperer (died 2004)
- Children: 4
- Education: University of Florida
- Occupation: Businessman

Dan Scarborough (February 6, 1933 – September 24, 2008) was a Democratic politician from Florida who served as a member of the Florida House of Representatives from 1966 to 1968 and as a member of the Florida Senate from 1968 to 1980.

== Florida Senate ==
Scarborough was born in Hortense, Georgia, in 1933, and grew up in Jacksonville, Florida, graduating from Lee High School in 1951. He then attended the University of Florida, where he played on the football team. Scarborough worked for Southern Bell, and later started his own answering service company.

== Florida House of Representatives ==
In 1966, State Representative Clyde Simpson ran for the Florida Senate, and Scarborough ran to succeed him for the Group 1 seat from Duval County in the Florida House of Representatives. He faced attorney Giles Lewis in the Democratic primary, and defeated him by a wide margin, winning 64 percent of the vote. In the general election, Scarborough was challenged by Gerry Hendree, the Republican nominee, and narrowly defeated her, winning 53 percent of vote to her 47 percent.

When the state was required to shift to single-member districts and hold a special election under the new lines in 1967, Scarborough ran in the newly created 18th district. He was unopposed.

== Florida Senate ==
In 1968, State Senator John Fisher opted to seek re-election in the 12th district rather than the 10th district, which he represented. Scarborough ran to succeed him, and faced Jacksonville City Commissioner Dick Burroughs in the primary. Scarborough won the primary with 55 percent of the vote, and faced Marvin Duncan, the Republican nominee, in the general election. He defeated Duncan by a wide margin, receiving 67 percent of the vote.

Following redistricting in 1972, Scarborough ran for re-election in the 7th district. He won the Democratic primary unopposed, and was challenged by former State Representative Gifford Grange. Scarborough defeated Grange with 62 percent of the vote.

In 1976, Scarborough sought a third term, and was challenged by David Troxler in the Democratic primary. He won the primary by a wide margin, and was unopposed in the general election.

Scarborough ran for re-election in 1980, and was challenged by Dan Jenkins, an ordained minister and land developer. Jenkins, a born again Christian, attacked Scarborough for his support of the Equal Rights Amendment. Shortly before the primary, Scarborough was questioned by the Federal Bureau of Investigation after he was caught up in a sting operation involving an FBI informant whom he attempted to help get a liquor license. Following the allegations, Jenkins defeated Scarborough in a landslide, winning 70 percent of the vote to Scarborough's 30 percent.

== Legal troubles ==
After Scarborough left the legislature, he was charged with extortion and mail fraud. Following a 1982 trial, he was found guilty of four separate counts. He was sentenced to two years in prison, and was released after serving seventeen months of his sentence.

== Death ==
Scarborough died on September 24, 2008.
