= Gordon State College =

Public college in Barnesville, Georgia, US

- Seal of Gordon State College
- Former names: Gordon Institute, Gordon Military College
- Type: Public college
- Established: 1852; 174 years ago [The Male and Female Seminary]
- Parent institution: University System of Georgia
- Accreditation: SACSCOC
- Endowment: $15 million
- President: Donald J. Green
- Students: 3,135
- Undergraduates: 3,135
- Location: Barnesville, Georgia, U.S. 33.0474°N 84.1513°W
- Colors: blue, green, and gold
- Nickname: Highlanders
- Sporting affiliations: NJCAA Division I, GCAA
- Mascot: Stag
- Website: gordonstate.edu

Location in Georgia

Gordon State College is a public college in Barnesville, Georgia, United States. A member of the University System of Georgia (USG), Gordon State's spring 2023 enrollment was 2,846 students.

Gordon College became a four-year state college in 2007 with the addition of a bachelor’s degree in early childhood education, and in 2012 its name changed to Gordon State College.

== History ==
=== 19th century ===
Gordon State College was founded in 1852 as the Male and Female Seminary, a private school for higher education of boys and girls. Though church-sponsored, it was not a seminary in the usual sense. During the American Civil War, boys were organized into a corps of cadets. Girls continued to attend but were never included in military programs.

In 1872, the school was renamed Gordon Institute to honor Georgia native, governor and former Confederate general John B. Gordon, and its scope was extended to the elementary grades. In 1890, J.C. Woodward, who later founded Georgia Military Academy, was hired to start a military program.

=== 20th century ===
In 1907, the name changed to Gordon College. In 1916 the U.S. Department of War named Gordon College a junior military unit. In 1928, Gordon added the first two years of college to its program. In 1933 the state offered the former Georgia Industrial College campus to Gordon College. The high school and junior college departments moved to the new campus, while the elementary school moved into the former high school building. Gordon College was known as Gordon Military College from the mid-1930s until 1972.

In the 1950s, ownership of the school passed to the city of Barnesville, which consolidated its government-funded public schools for Whites in grades 8–12, while continuing to bus Black students to racially segregated Lamar County schools. City girls were enrolled as regular students. City boys were permitted to opt out of military participation, but almost all were organized into a corps of cadets under military discipline. Military cadets from other places were permitted to enroll by paying tuition; attracted by low tuition rates, many cadets came from Latin America.

From May 1963 to April 1964, retired major general Derrill M. Daniel served as president. Gordon State experienced financial problems in the 1960s, and in 1970 the trustees approached the state about making the college part of the university system. The secondary school was separated and the cadet corps disbanded, and on July 2, 1972, Gordon Military College officially became part of the USG as Gordon Junior College, an associate-level college. In 1986, "junior" was dropped from the school's name.

=== 21st century ===
In 2006, the school was designated a four-year state college to offer baccalaureate programs within the USG's state college sector.

On August 8, 2012, the board of regents approved the change of the name of Gordon College to Gordon State College.

== Academics ==
Undergraduate demographics as of Fall 2023
Race and ethnicity	Total
White	47%
Black	42%
Hispanic	6%
Two or more races	4%
Asian	1%
Unknown	1%
Economic diversity
Low-income (Note: The percentage of students who received an income-based federal Pell grant intended for low-income students.)	55%
Affluent (Note: The percentage of students who are a part of the American middle class at the bare minimum.)	45%

Gordon State College offers Bachelor of Arts, Associate of Arts, Bachelor of Science, and Associate of Science degrees as well as a Nexus degree in film production.

== Athletics ==
Gordon State College competes in Region XVII of the National Junior College Athletic Association at the NJCAA Division I level as a member of the Georgia Collegiate Athletic Association (GCAA). Men's sports include baseball, basketball, and club football while women's sports include soccer, softball, and volleyball; the college also fields co-ed golf and esports teams. There are also a variety of intramural sports.

Before the 1980s, the athletic teams at Gordon State were the Bulldogs. Through the mid-1980s, Gordon State's teams were known as the Generals, a nod to General Gordon. The teams are now called the Highlanders.

== Notable alumni ==
- Rufus C. Harris, Tulane University president
- William D. Pawley, United States ambassador to Peru and Brazil; businessman
- Richard B. Russell Jr., governor of Georgia
- Clyde Simpson, Member of the Florida House of Representatives
