= Daniel Jenkins (disambiguation) =

Daniel or Dan Jenkins may refer to:

- Daniel Jenkins (born 1963), American actor
- Dan Jenkins (1928–2019), American author and sportswriter
- Dan Jenkins (politician) (1940–2007), American politician from Florida
