= Grandad Bluff =

Steep bank on the east side of La Crosse, Wisconsin

Coordinates: 43°48′51″N 091°12′32″W

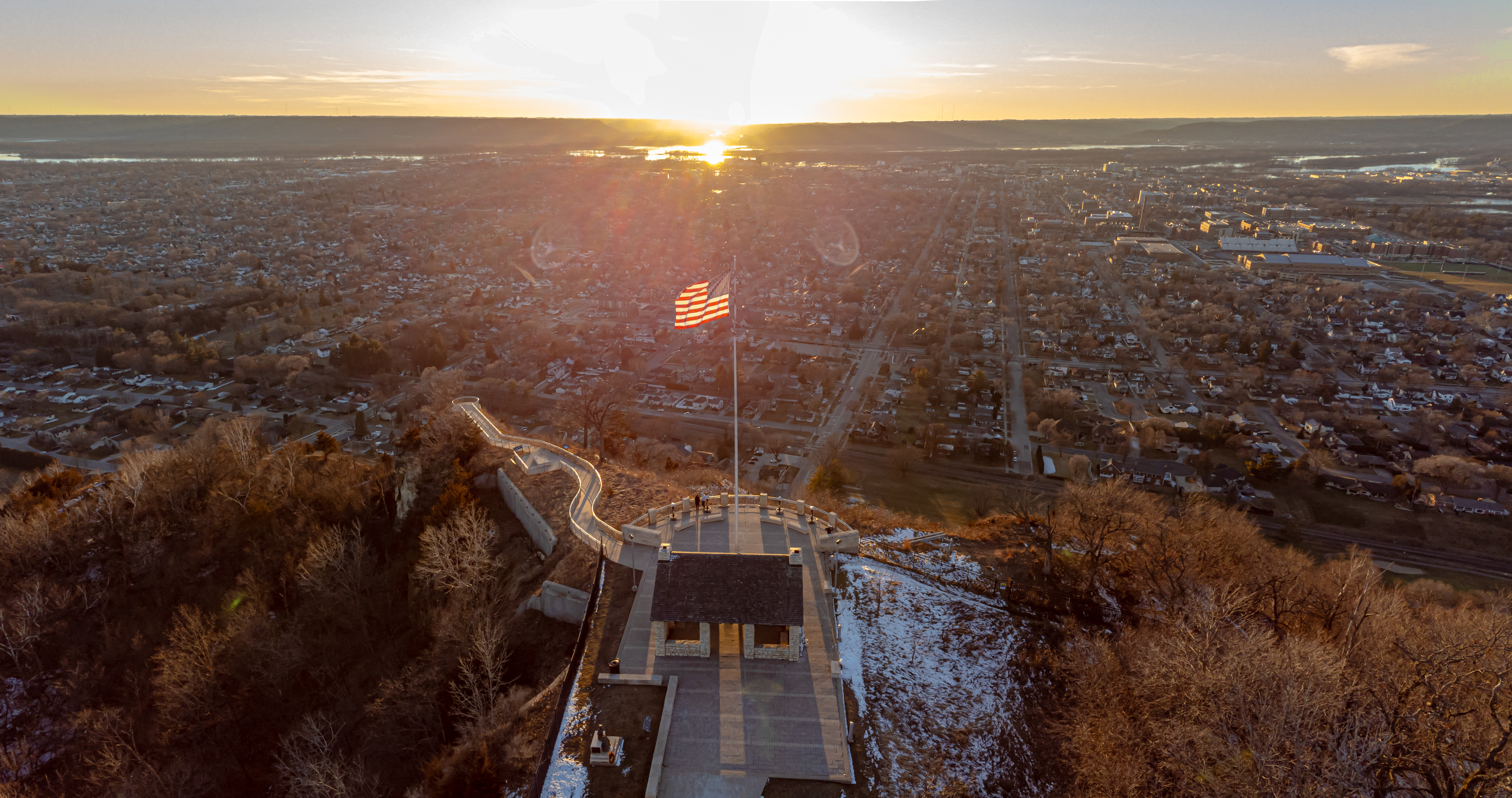
Grandad's bluff La Crosse

Grandad Bluff (also Granddad Bluff) is a bluff on the east side of La Crosse, Wisconsin. It is approximately 590 feet (180 m) above the surrounding land and 1,183 feet (361 m) above sea level. Bliss Road provides access to the bluff.

A park shelter in a fenced-off area atop the bluff provides visitors with a view of La Crosse. It contains a panoramic photo of La Crosse taken in 2004, with annotations of La Crosse landmarks. Locations visible from the bluff include the University of Wisconsin–La Crosse, the Mississippi River, bluffs in Minnesota, and Interstate 90.

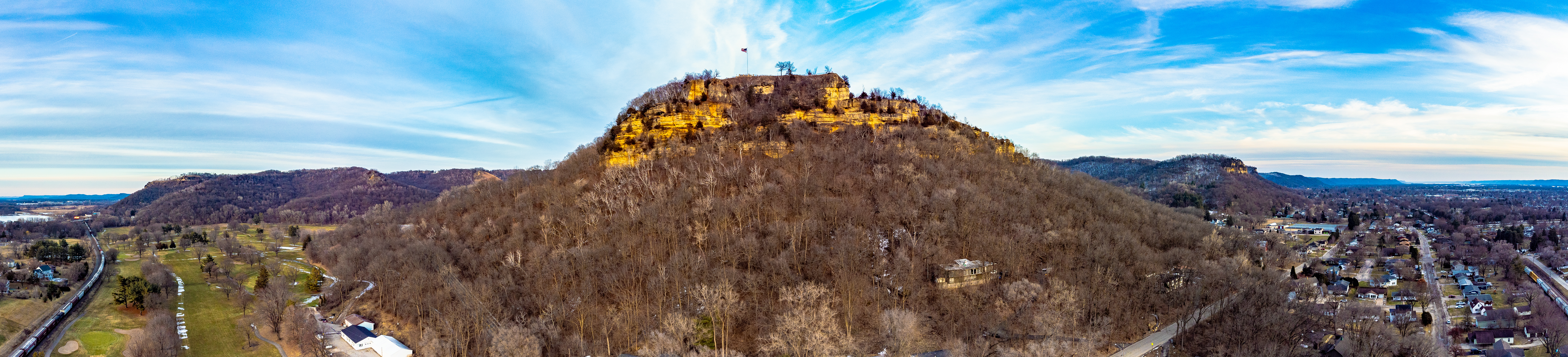

== Geology ==
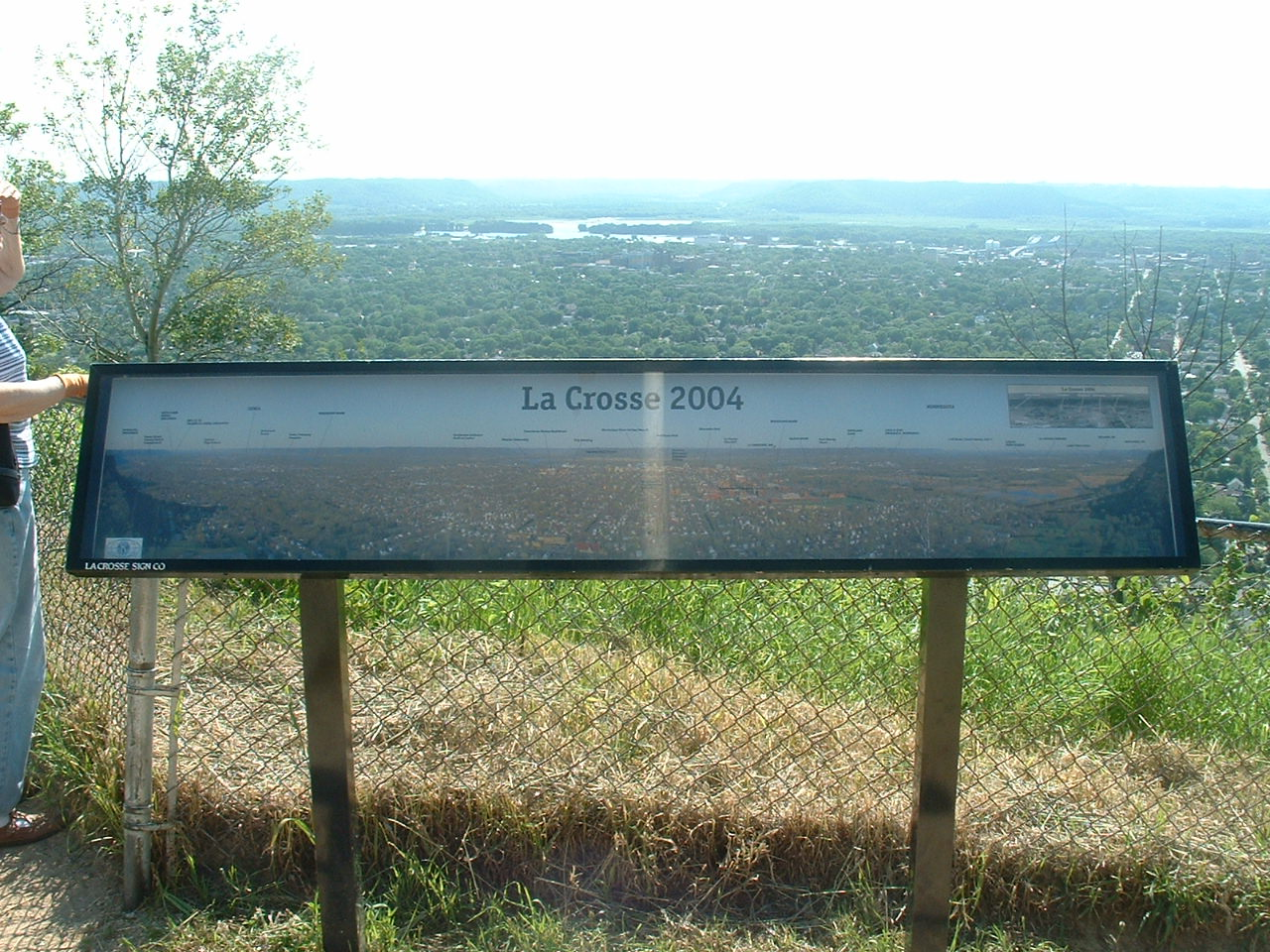
The panoramic sign and the panorama from the bluff.

The landscape has a geomorphically young appearance because of its Pleistocene history. The Mississippi River probably did not occupy this course before the Pleistocene. The bluffs along this portion of the Mississippi River consist of dolomite of the Prairie du Chien Group capping Cambrian sandstone. Grandad Bluff is a classic mesa, as are all the bluffs along the river.

== History ==
The land comprising much of Grandad Bluff was first purchased from the state by Judge George Gale in July 1851. Between 1851 and 1912, there were 83 transfers of the property. The bluff was used as a source of construction materials, and its limestone was quarried for many years. The bluff was to be sold for large-scale quarrying, however the La Crosse residents were outraged by the plans. To save the bluff from ruin, Ellen Hixon and her son Joseph, a prominent La Crosse family, purchased the land in 1909. The family held the property in trust until 1912 when the land was donated as a park to the city of La Crosse. A group of residents, led by Ellen Hixon, raised $15,000 to construct roads and purchase more land around the bluff. The area below Grandad Bluff became the center of Hixon Forest, which continues to serve as a popular hiking area.

In 1928 there was a movement to change the name of the bluff to Granddad Mountain, and to name the series of bluffs along the Mississippi River "The Mississippi Mountain Range".

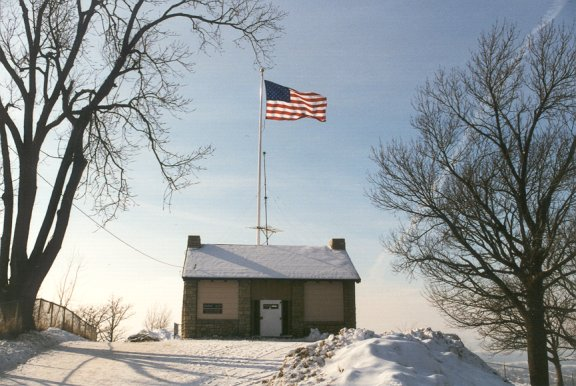
The shelter and new flagpole

A shelter was constructed in Grandad Bluff Park in 1938 by the Works Progress Administration using stone quarried from the south side of the bluff. In 1941, a 65 ft (20 m) flagpole was erected by the La Crosse chapter of Reserve Officers Association using money raised by schoolchildren. Eleven years later, in 1952, a rustic split rail fence of native oak was constructed, along with two new picnic areas with parking. The shelter was wired with electricity in 1954, and public restrooms were constructed about ten years later. A new pump house was built in 1976. Landscaping projects were completed during the 1980s, and a new 75 ft (23 m) flagpole was erected by the La Crosse Jaycees in 1994. In 2015, a statue of Ellen Hixon was dedicated on top of Grandad Bluff.

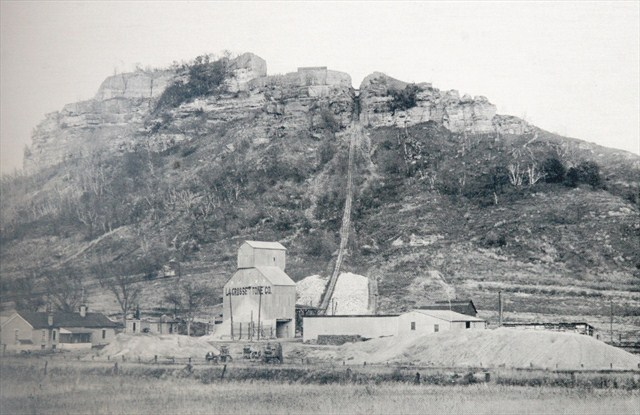
Grandad Bluff with quarry operation in foreground

Since 1929, the La Crosse Skyrockers organization has conducted a fireworks show from atop Grandad Bluff at midnight on New Year's Eve. The show is patterned after the New Year's fireworks show that takes place over Pikes Peak in Colorado.

== Recreation ==
In 2020, the Lacrosse City Council legalized rock climbing in Grandad Bluff, and community groups added bolts for sport climbing and top-rope anchors.

The same year, the Outdoor Recreation Alliance broke ground on a mountain bike trail system. Originally proposed as a way for bikers to avoid the narrow access road, Grandad Bluff has over 3 miles of singletrack mountain bike trail and is connected to the larger Gateway Trail system.
