= Joe Gow =

American academic and pornographic actor

Chancellor of University of Wisconsin–La Crosse
- In office February 1, 2007 – December 2023
- Preceded by: Douglas N. Hastad
- Succeeded by: Betsy Morgan

Interim President of Nebraska Wesleyan University
- In office 2006 – 2007
- Preceded by: Jeanie Watson
- Succeeded by: Frederik Ohles

Dean of the College of Liberal Arts and Sciences at Nebraska Wesleyan University
- In office February 2004 – 2006

Dean of the College of Liberal Arts at Winona State University
- In office 2001 – 2004

Personal details
- Born: 1960 (age 65–66) Newark, New York, United States
- Spouse: Carmen Wilson
- Education: Penn State University; University of Alabama

Joseph Durnin Gow (born 1960) is an American academic who served as president of Nebraska Wesleyan University from 2006 to 2007, and then as chancellor of the University of Wisconsin–La Crosse from 2007 until his termination from the position in December 2023, when it was discovered that he and his wife had publicly produced pornographic films.

== Early life, education, and musical endeavors ==
Born in Newark, New York, Gow initially enrolled at West Chester University of Pennsylvania before transferring to New York University and transferring again to Pennsylvania State University, where he earned an undergraduate degree in journalism in 1982. Gow received a master's degree in Speech Communication from the University of Alabama, then returned to Penn State to earn a PhD in Speech Communication. Before pursuing his advanced degrees, he spent two years as the guitarist and frontman of a rock band called Johnny Deadline, which released an EP titled Whatever Happened to Rock & Roll in 1982. The band broke up later that year, but reunited for shows in 1987, while Gow was teaching for a year at the University of Cincinnati, and had a reunion tour in 1999, while Gow was employed as a professor of communications at Alfred University. While at Alfred, Gow, then director of the communications studies program, published a 1993 study on the influence of MTV, concluding that male performers were substantially over-represented, despite the "revolutionary" status of the enterprise, writing that MTV "finds itself in the incongruous position of presenting videos that reinforce very traditional gender definitions".

== Academic administration ==
In 2001, Gow became dean of the College of Liberal Arts at Winona State University in Winona, Minnesota, and in February 2004, Gow was hired as dean of liberal arts at Nebraska Wesleyan University. In 2006, Gow was promoted to serve as interim president of Nebraska Wesleyan for one year, insisting on a salary tens of thousands of dollars lower than the salary that was offered. Described as "a student and faculty favorite", his salary decision presented a stark contrast with that of his predecessor, who had secured a $750,000 retirement package when leaving the position.

=== Chancellor of the University of Wisconsin–La Crosse ===
Gow began as chancellor of the University of Wisconsin–La Crosse on February 1, 2007. Shortly after taking over as chancellor, he performed for students at a battle of the bands at the Cartwright Center's "Cellar" restaurant. In 2018, Gow courted controversy when he brought pornographic actress Nina Hartley to the campus to speak as part of a campus "Free Speech Week", paying her $5,000 out of university funds for her appearance. Gow was reprimanded for this event, and was one of a handful of university chancellors in the Wisconsin state system who was denied an annual raise. In August 2023, Gow announced that he planned to step down as chancellor in 2024, and at the time the announcement was met with praise for his work during his tenure.

==== Adult film controversy and termination ====
In December 2023, Gow was terminated from his position as chancellor when it was discovered that he and his current wife, Carmen Wilson, also a former professor at the university, uploaded adult videos of themselves to websites such as OnlyFans and PornHub. The couple also wrote two books together, Married with Benefits: Our Real-Life Adult Industry Adventures, and Monogamy with Benefits: How Porn Enriches Our Relationship, under the pen names of Geri and Jay Hart. The couple created social media profiles on several services under the name, "Sexy Happy Couple", and hosted a YouTube channel titled "Sexy Healthy Cooking", which featured videos of them cooking vegan dishes with pornographic actors.

Gow challenged the decision as a violation of his freedom of speech. According to Gow, he did not use University of Wisconsin resources in the production of the videos or mention his connection to the college. Following his termination, a local brewery capitalized on the controversy by offering a "Hot for Chancellor" beer featuring a caricature of Gow on the can.

In April 2024, in addition to firing him as chancellor, the university administration sought to remove him from his position as a tenured professor. In July 2024, a committee of peer-tenured faculty had voted to recommend that he be removed from his faculty position. In September 2024, the Universities of Wisconsin Board of Regents voted 17–0 to fire him from his tenured faculty job over making pornography. In response, Gow noted that "the regents claim to want to protect and promote free expression, but their action today shows this isn't true", describing them as "a Board of Hypocrites". The Foundation for Individual Rights and Expression called the termination "a major blow to academic freedom and faculty free speech rights." In early 2025, Gow filed suit against the Universities of Wisconsin seeking reinstatement to his tenured faculty position. He also disputed the university's allegation that he refused to cooperate with its investigation, asserting that he had merely sought legal counsel before participating. In early 2026, Gow and his wife won an XMA Award for best sex scene in a featurette. As of July 2026 the university litigation remained pending.
