= University of Wisconsin–La Crosse =

Public university in La Crosse, Wisconsin, US

- Former names: La Crosse State Normal School (1909–1926); La Crosse State Teachers College (1926–1951); Wisconsin State College-La Crosse (1951–1964); Wisconsin State University-La Crosse (1964–1971)
- Motto: Mens corpusque (Latin)
- Motto in English: "Mind and Body"
- Type: Public research university
- Established: 1909; 117 years ago
- Parent institution: University of Wisconsin System
- Accreditation: HLC
- Endowment: $42.7 million (2025)
- Budget: $246.2 million (2025)
- Chancellor: James M. Beeby
- Provost: Betsy Morgan
- Students: 10,622 (2025)
- Undergraduates: 9,675
- Postgraduates: 947
- Location: La Crosse, Wisconsin, United States; 43.8155°N 91.2310°W
- Campus: 128 acres (0.52 km^{2}); Small city
- Newspaper: The Racquet Press
- Colors: Maroon and grey
- Nickname: Eagles
- Sporting affiliations: NCAA Division III – WIAC
- Mascot: Stryker the Eagle
- Website: uwlax.edu
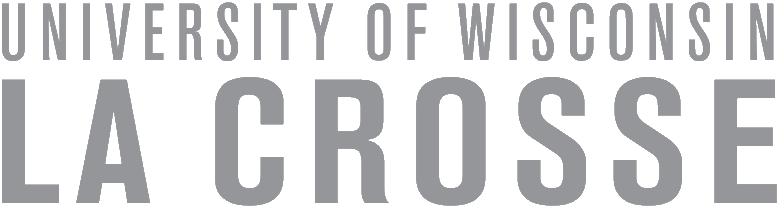

The University of Wisconsin–La Crosse (UWL or UW–La Crosse) is a public research university in La Crosse, Wisconsin, United States. Established in 1909 as La Crosse State Normal School, it is part of the University of Wisconsin System and offers bachelor's, master's, and doctoral degrees.

With 9,600 undergraduate and 1,000 graduate students, UW-La Crosse is composed of four schools and colleges offering 102 undergraduate programs, 31 graduate programs, and 2 doctoral programs. UW-La Crosse has over 95,000 alumni across all 50 U.S. states and 57 countries as of 2021.

The UW-La Crosse Eagle's 21 athletic teams compete in the Wisconsin Intercollegiate Athletic Conference, in NCAA's Division III. The university mascot is Stryker the Eagle.

== History ==
=== Early years ===
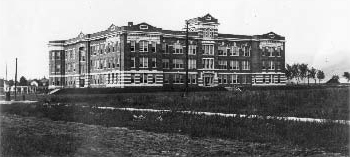
Main Hall, now known as Maurice O. Graff Main Hall, is the original campus building

The university was founded as the La Crosse State Normal School in 1909, the eighth of nine state normal schools established in Wisconsin between 1866 and 1916 for teacher preparation. Thomas Morris sponsored the bill in the Wisconsin State Senate that led to the university's creation. Initially, the La Crosse State Normal School was authorized to offer two-year programs to prepare students for the teaching profession. Main Hall (now Maurice O. Graff Main Hall), the original building on campus, was constructed the year the school was founded. The La Crosse State Normal School opened its doors later that same year with Fassett A. Cotton as its first president.

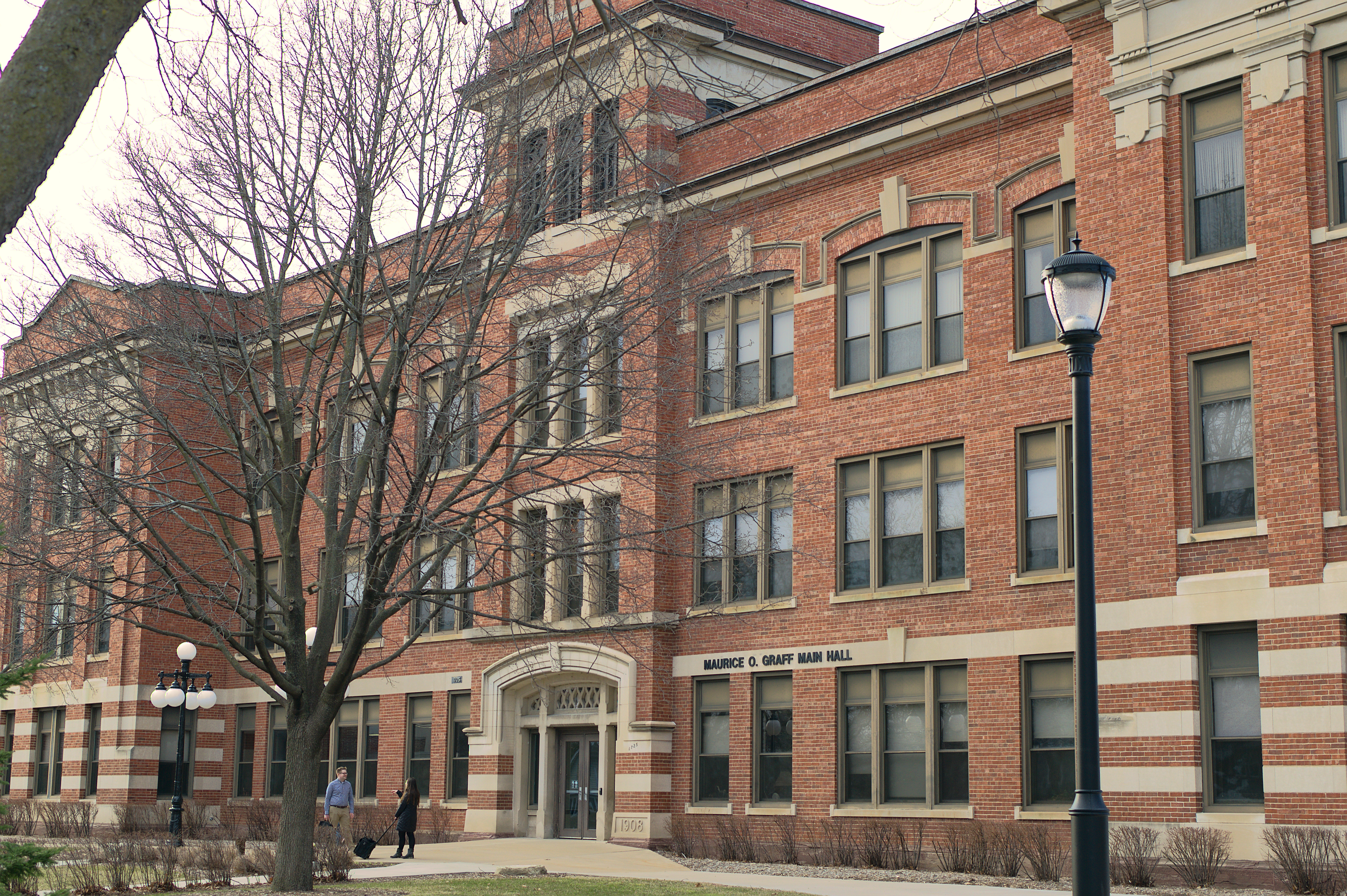
Maurice O. Graff Main Hall in 2017

La Crosse State Normal School students began organizing several extra-curricular activities within two years of the school's founding. In 1910, students published the first campus newspaper, The Racquet, which is still published today. The Physical Education Club was formed in 1912, making it the longest-continuous organization in the school's history.

The Physical Education Building (now Wittich Hall), the original physical education building, was completed in 1916 after delays due to the start of World War I. This was not the only setback for the school during this period. The school struggled through serious declines in enrollment and funding following World War I and throughout the Great Depression.

In 1926, George M. Snodgrass became the school's third president, replacing Ernest A. Smith, who served for only one year. That same year the school's programs were expanded and authorization was given to award baccalaureate teaching degrees. This led to an institutional name change the following year to La Crosse State Teachers College.

In 1931, the college was divided into separate elementary education, secondary education, and physical education divisions. It was also this year that the homecoming tradition of the "Hanging of the Lantern" began at the south entrance of Maurice O. Graff Main Hall. It was created by English teacher Orris O. White who remarked, "We'll hang the lantern in the old college tower... You won't need to look for the key – the door will be open." The Training School, which had also been referred to as the Campus School and the Model School, moved into its newly constructed building in 1939. The La Crosse State Teachers College Training School Building was later renamed Morris Hall in honor of Wisconsin politician, Thomas Morris. The Training School provided practice and supervised observation for teacher training candidates. 1973 was the last year of operation for the Training School. Rexford S. Mitchell became the college's fourth president that same year, serving until 1966.

=== Post-World War II ===
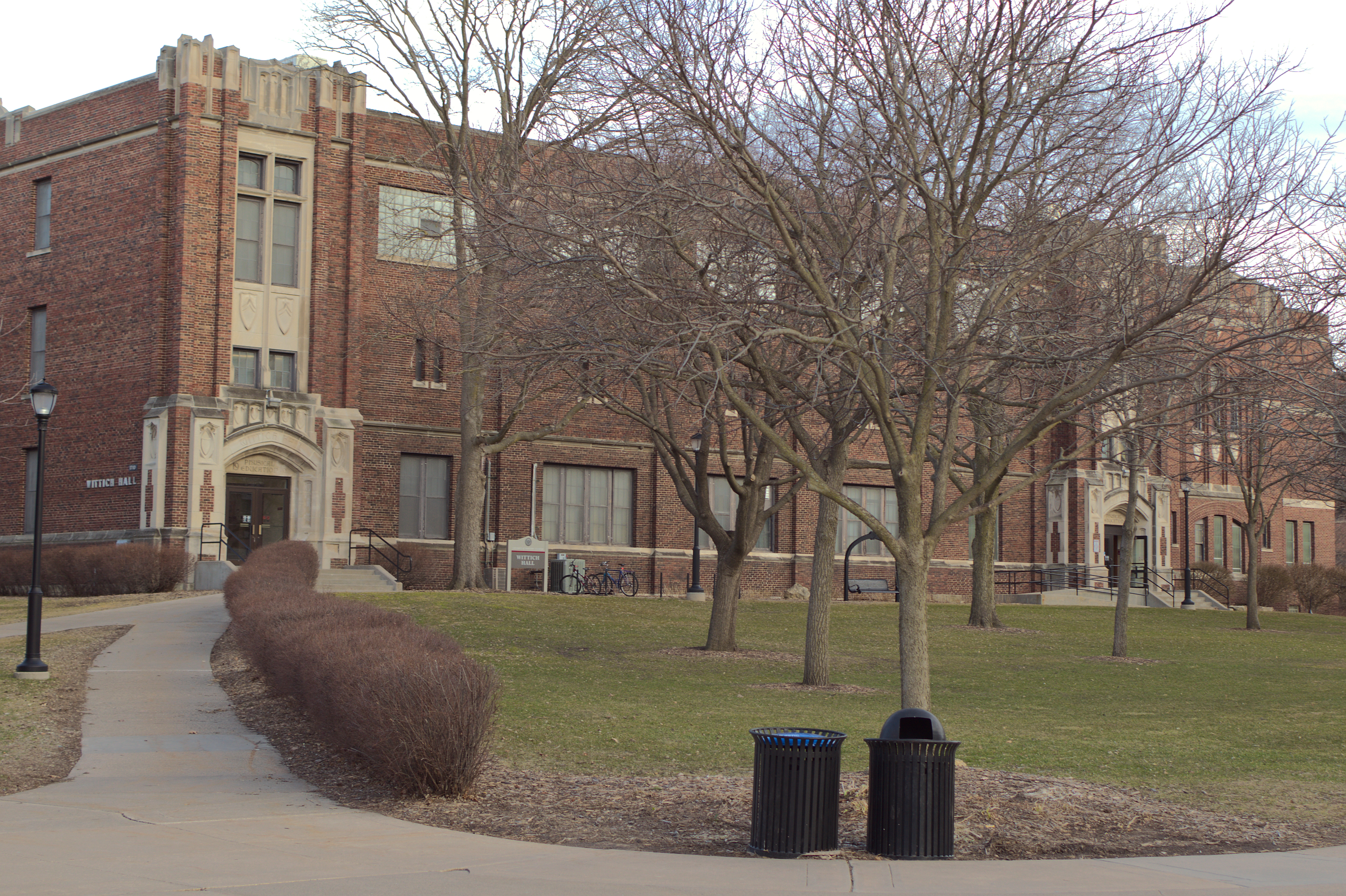
Wittich Hall, the second building built on campus

After the Regents authorized the nine Wisconsin State Teachers Colleges to establish baccalaureate degrees in liberal arts, the college changed its name to Wisconsin State College-La Crosse in 1951. It was also this same year that Wilder Hall became the first campus residence hall. In 1956, the college was authorized to establish graduate programs, which led to the Master of Science and Master of Arts in Teaching degrees. A graduate program in physical education was also established at that time. Florence Wing Library, the college's first library, was constructed that same year and began a period of substantial expansion for the college. Over the next 18 years (1956–1974), the college ballooned from 5 buildings to a total of 23 buildings. The college added 11 residence halls, 4 academic buildings, 2 libraries, and 2 student centers during that time.

In 1959, the college celebrated its 50th anniversary, with an enrollment of 1,821 students. That same year presidential candidate John F. Kennedy visited campus and spoke to a packed Graff Main Hall auditorium.

In 1964, the college was designated a university as part of the Wisconsin State University System and was renamed Wisconsin State University-La Crosse. This designation led to the creation of the Colleges of Education, Health-Recreation-Physical Education, and Letters and Sciences. Later, the School of Business Administration was also formed within the College of Letters and Sciences. A few years after receiving university designation, the university's fifth president, Samuel G. Gates, began his term in 1966.

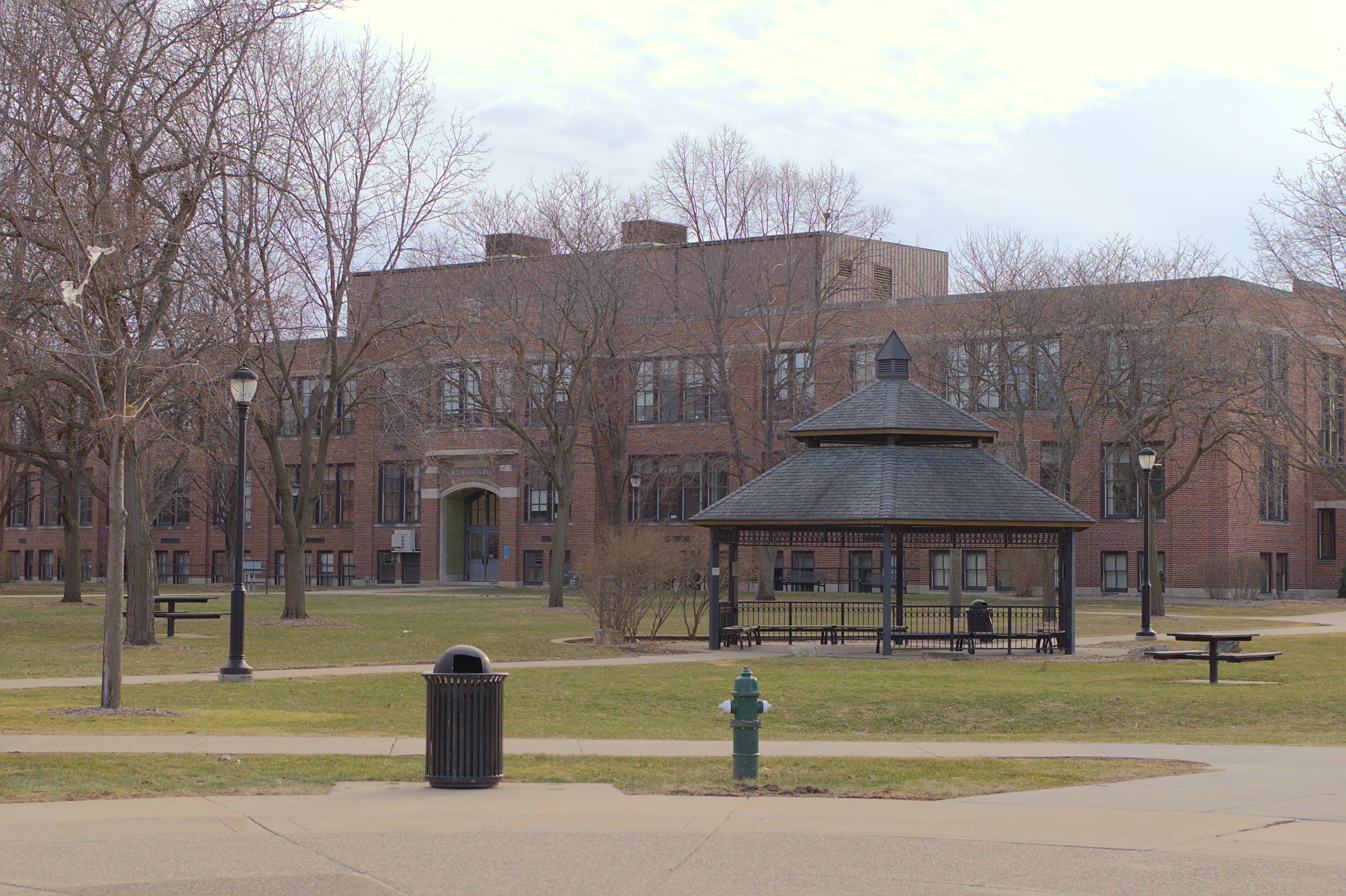
Morris Hall, the third building built on campus

The Wisconsin State University System merged with the University of Wisconsin System in 1971, at which time the university adopted its current name, the University of Wisconsin–La Crosse, and also changed the title for the head of the university from President to Chancellor. Kenneth E. Lindner, who was at the time the university's sixth president, became the university's first chancellor. Lindner, after serving as chancellor from 1971 to 1979, was succeeded by Noel Richards, who served as the university's chancellor until 1991. Lindner Forest, a heavily wooded section in the southern part of campus, was named in honor of former Chancellor Lindner.

In 1989, the university's mascot became the Eagle. UWL men's athletics teams had previously been known as the Indians (1937–1989), Red Raiders, Hurricanes, Racqueteers, and Peds and Maroons. The women's athletic teams were known as the Roonies, derived from the university's school colors of maroon and gray, since the inception of female intercollegiate competition in the early 1970s. They adopted the Eagle mascot a year after it became the university mascot. Since the adoption of the Eagle mascot, the band's mascot has been the Screaming Eagle, having been known as the Marching Chiefs before that. The "Eagle in the L" and caricature, which were both created in 1989, were unveiled just before the fall sports teams took to the field as the Eagles for the first time. They were penned by Dave Christianson, a 1973 arts graduate who created the images after the adoption of the Eagle mascot.

=== 1990s ===
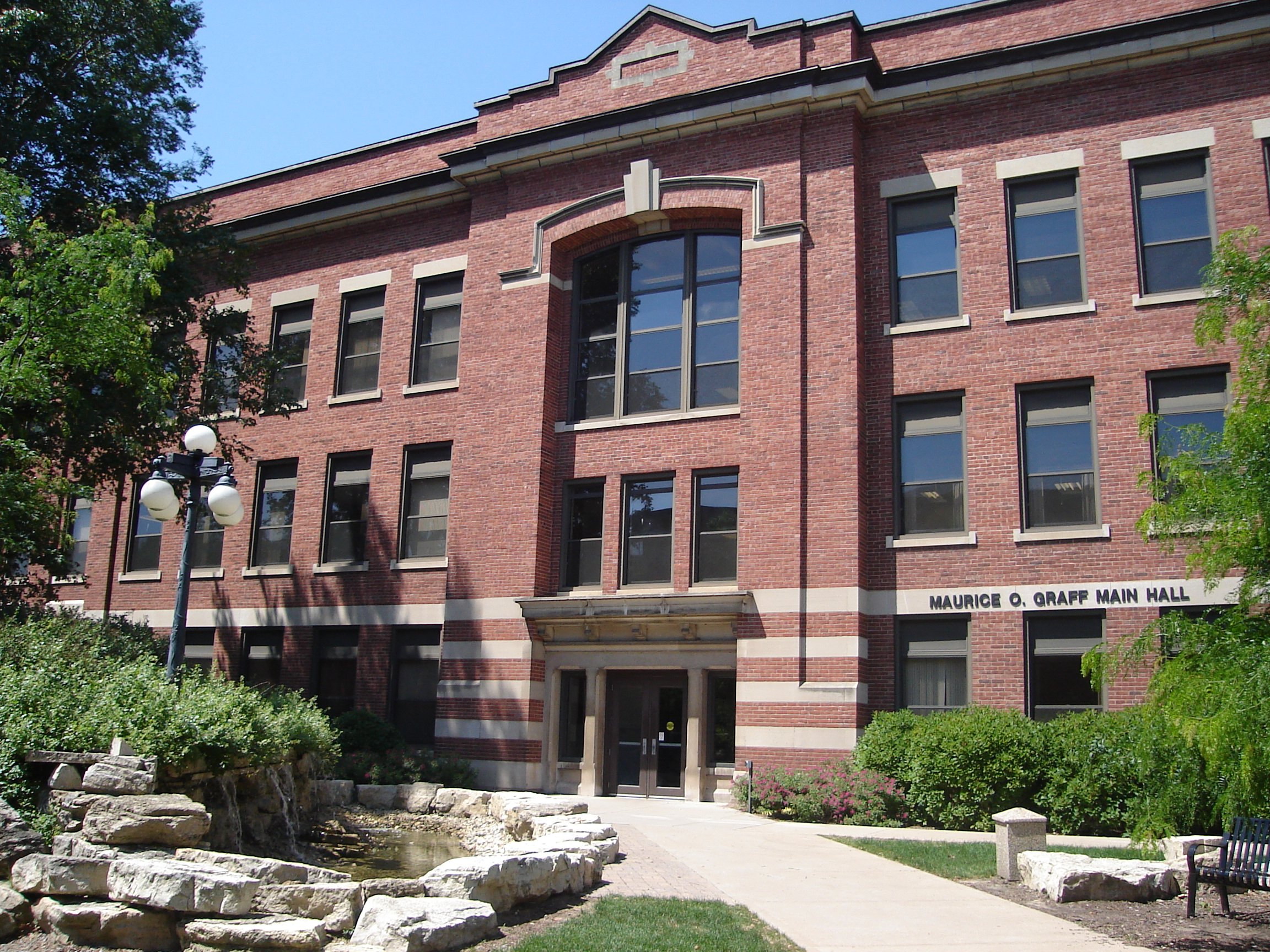
Fountain and the eastern side of Maurice O. Graff Main Hall

In 1991, Judith Kuipers became UWL's third chancellor, serving until 2000. She was the institution's first and only woman leader, until interim chancellor Betsy Morgan in 2023. In 1992, Kuipers was instrumental in the creation of the La Crosse Medical Health Science Consortium. The consortium, a collaboration of UWL, Viterbo University, Western Technical College, Franciscan Skemp Medical Center, and Gundersen Lutheran Medical Center, was created to provide cutting-edge medical education, research, and training. This led to the creation of the US $27 million Health Science Center in 2000.

Under the university's strategic plan, "Forward Together," the university reorganized into four colleges: the College of Business Administration; the College of Health, Physical Education, and Recreation; the College of Science and Allied Health; and the College of Liberal Studies, which housed the School of Arts and Communication and the School of Education. The College of Health, Physical Education, and Recreation underwent a few names changes before eventually merging with the College of Science and Allied Health to form the College of Science and Health in 2006.

The Cleary Alumni & Friends Center along with Murphy Library remodeling projects were completed in 1995. Construction continued on campus, and two years later, the Recreational Eagle Center and the Hoeschler clock tower were also finished. Hoeschler Tower becomes a focal point on campus and the new home for the traditional "Hanging of the Lantern."

=== 21st century ===
UW–La Crosse enrollment
Year	Enrollment
2007	9,975
2008	9,900
2009	9,890
2010	9,948
2011	10,074
2012	10,227
2013	10,427
2014	10,558
2015	10,408
2016	10,546
2017	10,499
2018	10,569
2019	10,580
2020	10,468
2021	10,314
2022	10,302
2023	10,327
2024	10,492
2025	10,627

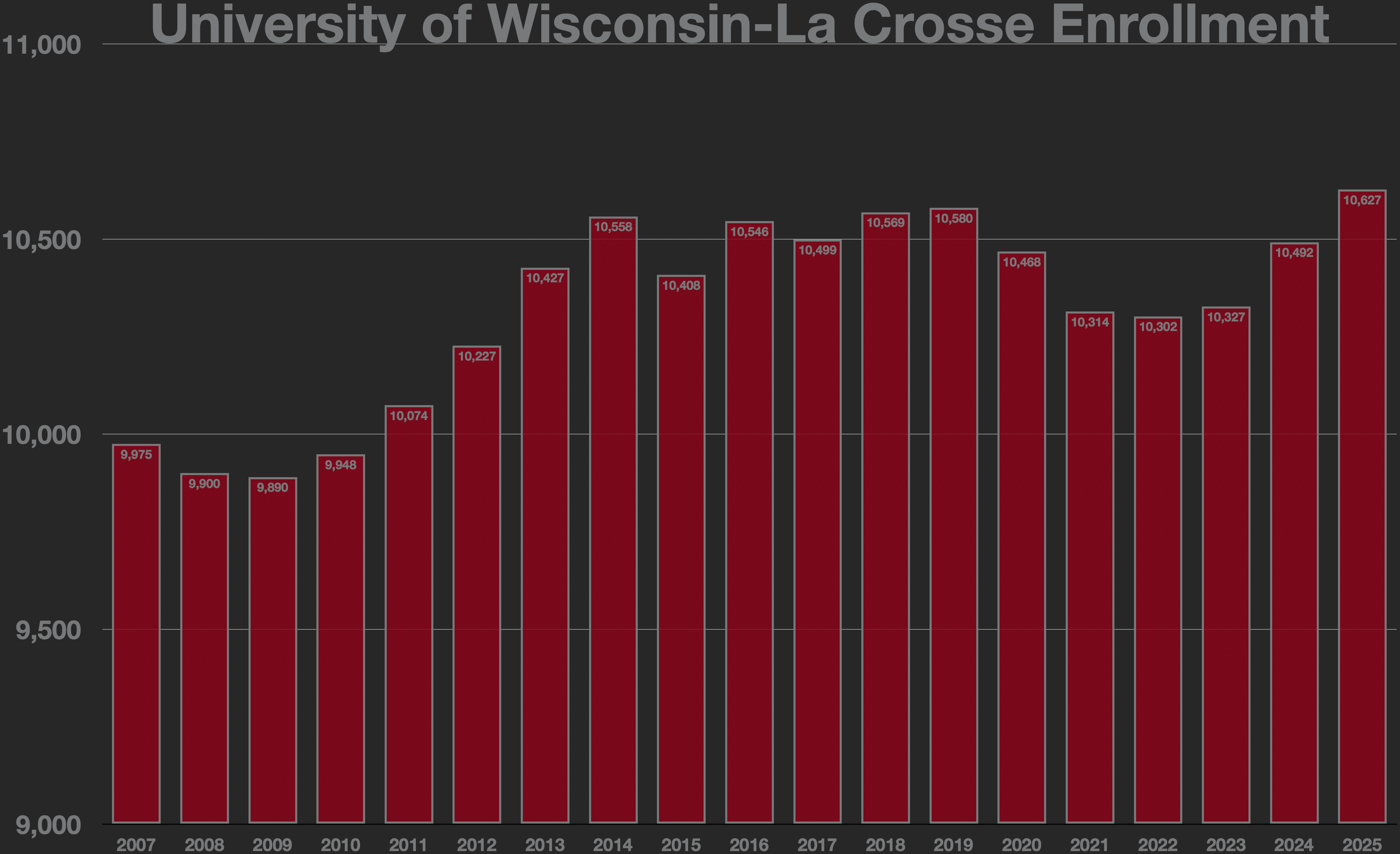
UW–La Crosse Enrollment

The turn of the century saw several changes at UWL. The Archaeology Building and Laboratories, which was a US $380,000 renovation of the campus's original power plant, had its grand opening that year. A US $9.9 million renovation to Wing Technology Center also was started at that time and was completed in 2001. Another major change was the resignation of Chancellor Kuipers. She was replaced on an interim basis by Douglas Hastad, who was named the university's fourth chancellor and ninth leader by the UW System Board of Regents in 2001.

In the 2001–2002 academic year, the university's athletic teams won four national championships, three NCAA Division III championships (indoor track and field, outdoor track and field, and cross country), and one NCGA title (women's gymnastics).

Joe Gow became the fifth chancellor and 10th leader of UW-La Crosse in 2007. He replaced Douglas Hastad. An accomplished guitarist, he performed at the Cartwright Center's "Cellar" restaurant for students after taking over as chancellor.

The percentage of the university's budget that is state-funded has declined. In 1996, students paid 35% of the cost of their education at UWL and the state the remaining 65%. By 2005, the student share had grown to 51% as the state's shrunk to 49%. The university has felt the strain caused by decreased public funding. The university's centennial campaign and "growth and access" agenda are both aimed at providing the necessary financial resources to deal with the decreased state funding.

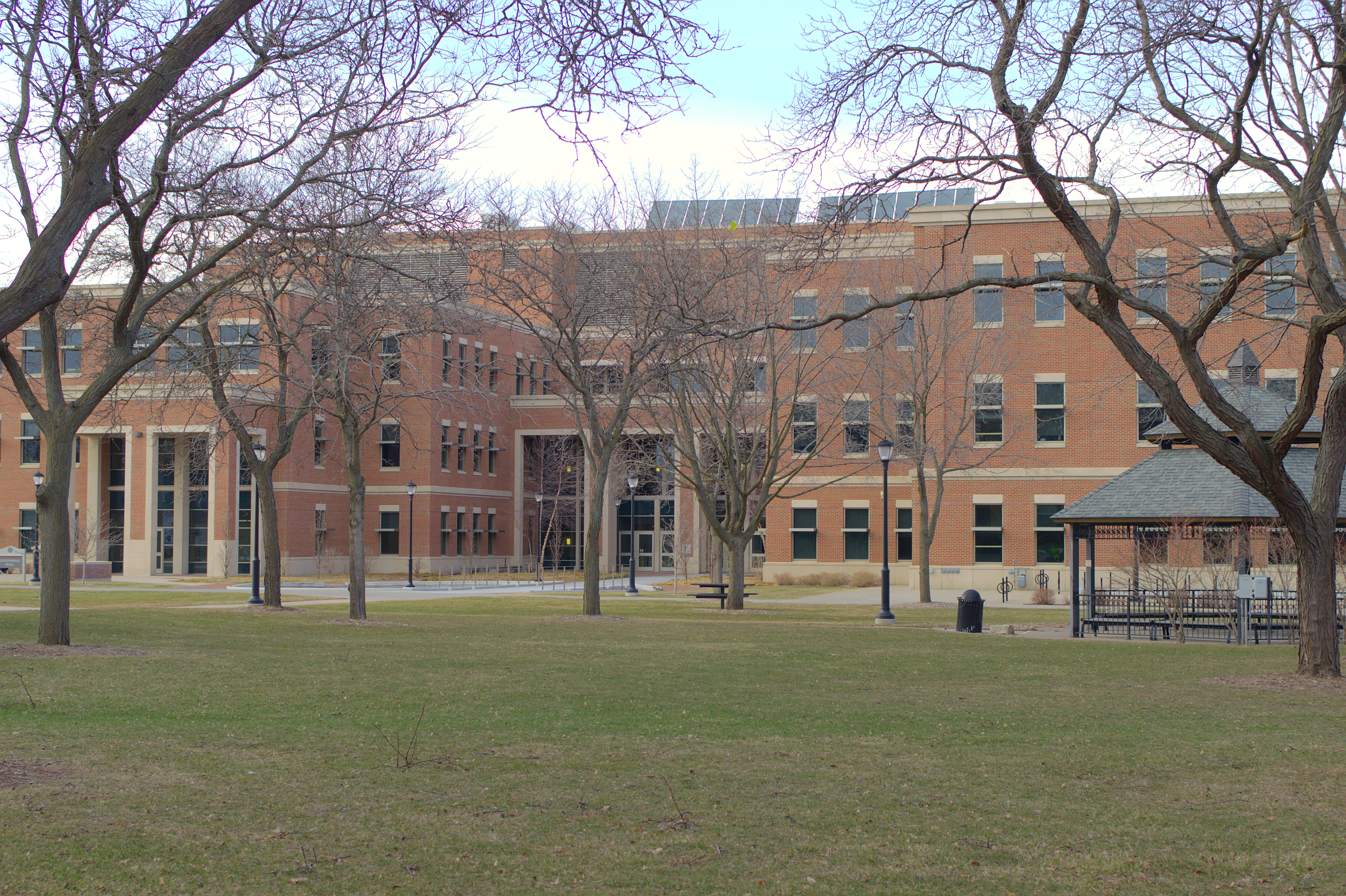
Centennial Hall

Construction for a new academic building, Centennial Hall, began in spring 2009 and the building opened for the fall 2011 academic year. Built for $44 million, it houses 44 classrooms, two auditoriums, the Academic Advising Center, Counseling and Testing Center, Multicultural Student Services, Office of International Education, and Student Support Services.

In 2018, the Prairie Springs Science Center opened at a cost of $82 million as an expansion of the nearby Cowley Center. Named after a $2 million gift from the Paul Fleckenstein Trust, the 187,000-square foot building expanded the university's science program facilities and research capacity. The project represents phase one of a larger expansion plan.

In late 2023, the University of Wisconsin System's board of regents unanimously voted to fire Joe Gow as chancellor and replace him with interim Chancellor Betsy Morgan. The termination came as a response to Gow being exposed for posting pornographic videos of him and his wife on public pornography hosting sites. Gow stated that his termination was a violation of his free speech rights and that he regretted not revealing his secret life sooner. Gow, who had announced in August 2023 that he would step down at the end of the academic year, had been previously reprimanded in 2018 for inviting porn actress Nina Hartley to speak on campus about free speech, which he said was a way of promoting academic freedom.

In March 2024, the university announced James Beeby as the next university chancellor.

== Campus ==
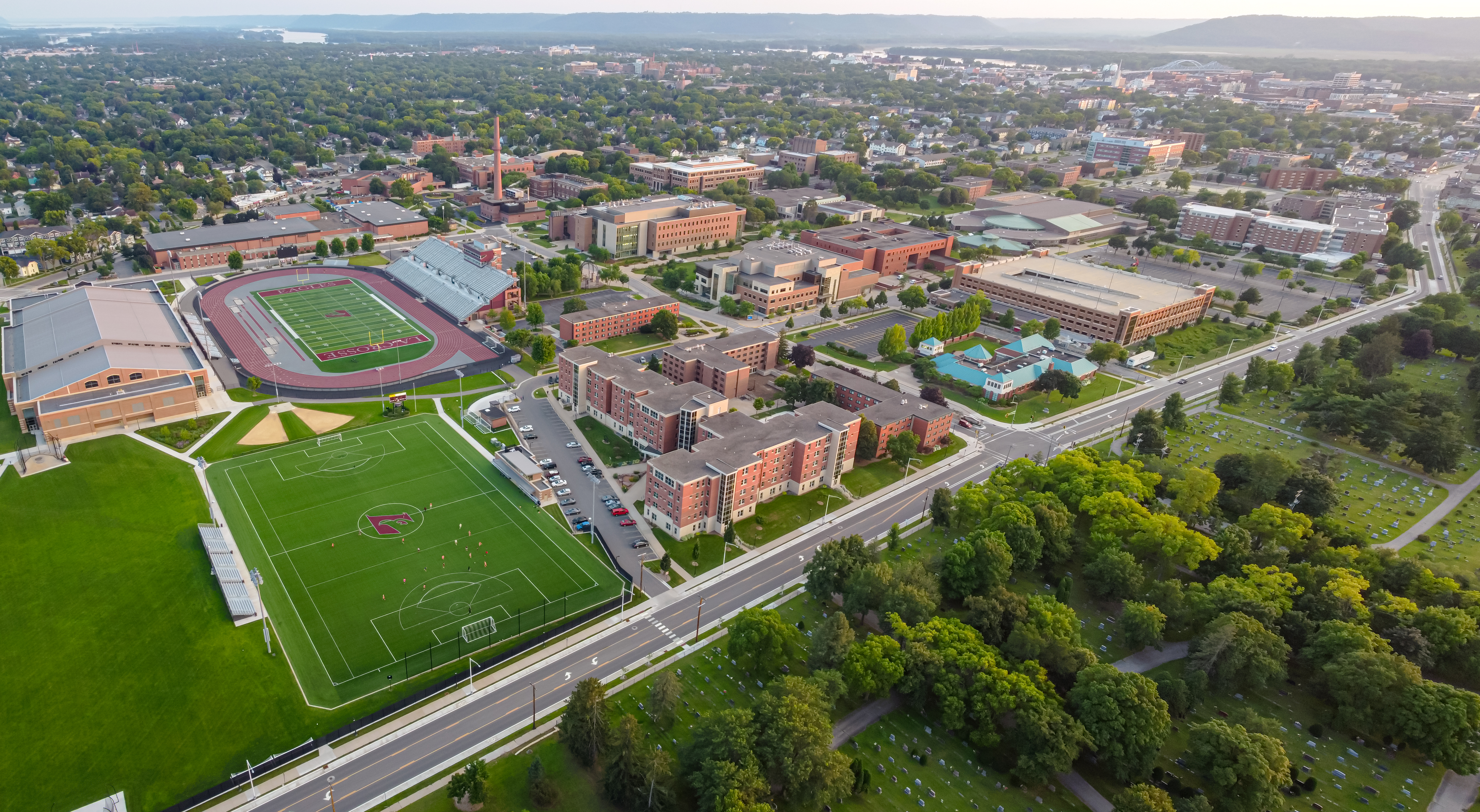
UW-L campus

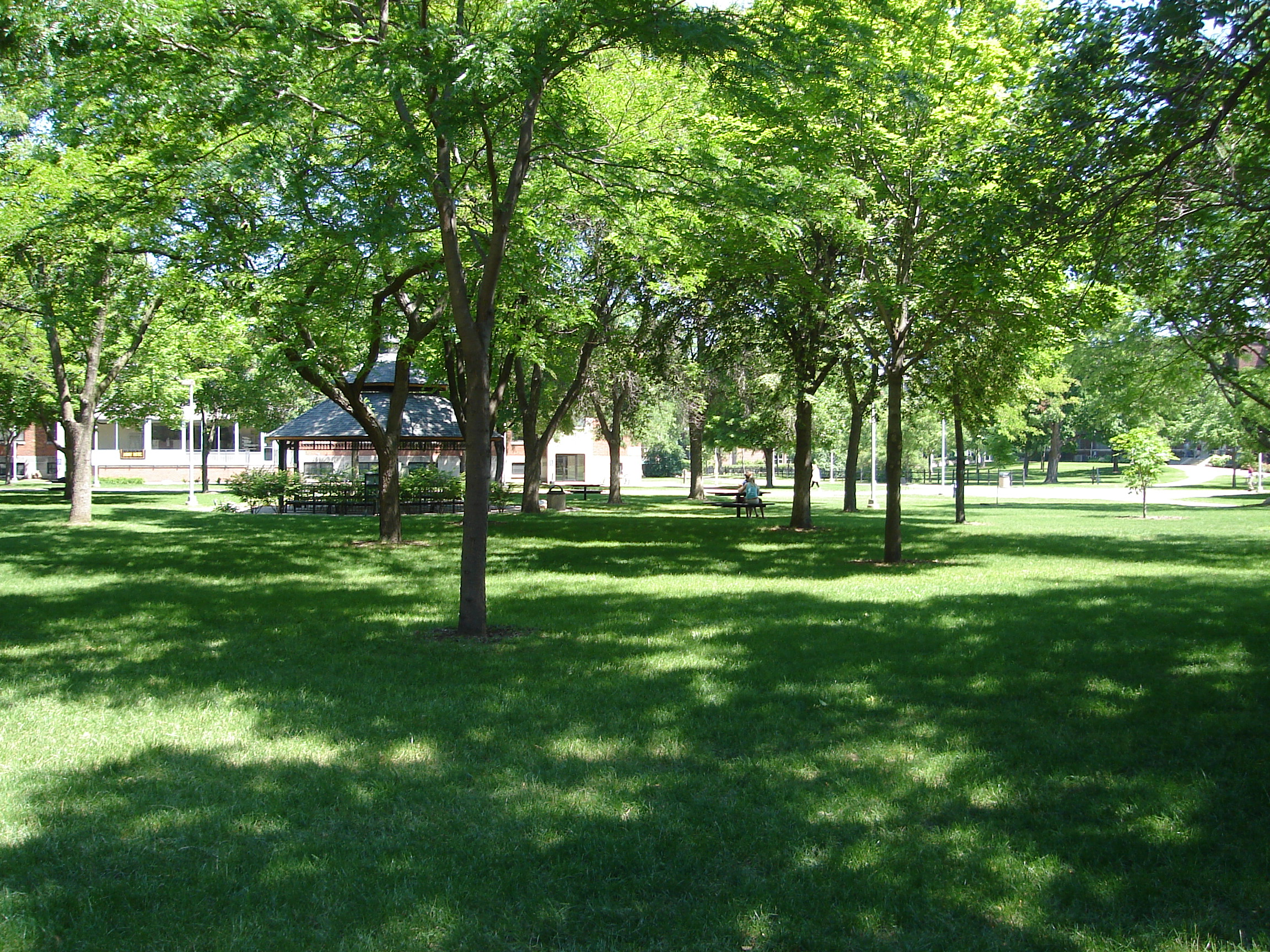
Lindner Forest, named in honor of former Chancellor Kenneth E. Lindner

The 128-acre (52 ha) campus is located in a residential section of La Crosse. The extensive landscape of grassy fields, trees, flowers, and other vegetation gives the campus a distinct park-like feel. The university has limited vehicle traffic on campus. In 2006, UW-La Crosse received a "Grand Award" at the 2006 Green Star Awards competition for its campus landscaping from the Professional Grounds Management Society.

To the east of campus is the La Crosse bluffs, of which the most prominent is Grandad Bluff (mentioned in Life on the Mississippi by Mark Twain. Downtown La Crosse and the Mississippi River are about a half mile west of campus.

Hoeschler Tower (1996), located in the heart of UWL, is the focal point of the campus and a popular destination and meeting place for students. It is also the site for many university and student events, such as concerts, fundraisers, the clocktower dance, memorial services, and the traditional hanging of the lantern.

Students can live in one of the university's residence halls. The newest residence hall, Eagle Hall, opened Fall 2011 and houses 500 students and the Office of Residence Life. Reuter Hall, an apartment-style residence hall, was completed in 2006. Two 1950s-era residence halls, Trowbridge Hall and Baird Hall, were demolished in the spring 2009 to make way for a new academic building, Centennial Hall, which was completed in the fall of 2011 and is the largest academic building on campus.

=== Notable and historic buildings ===
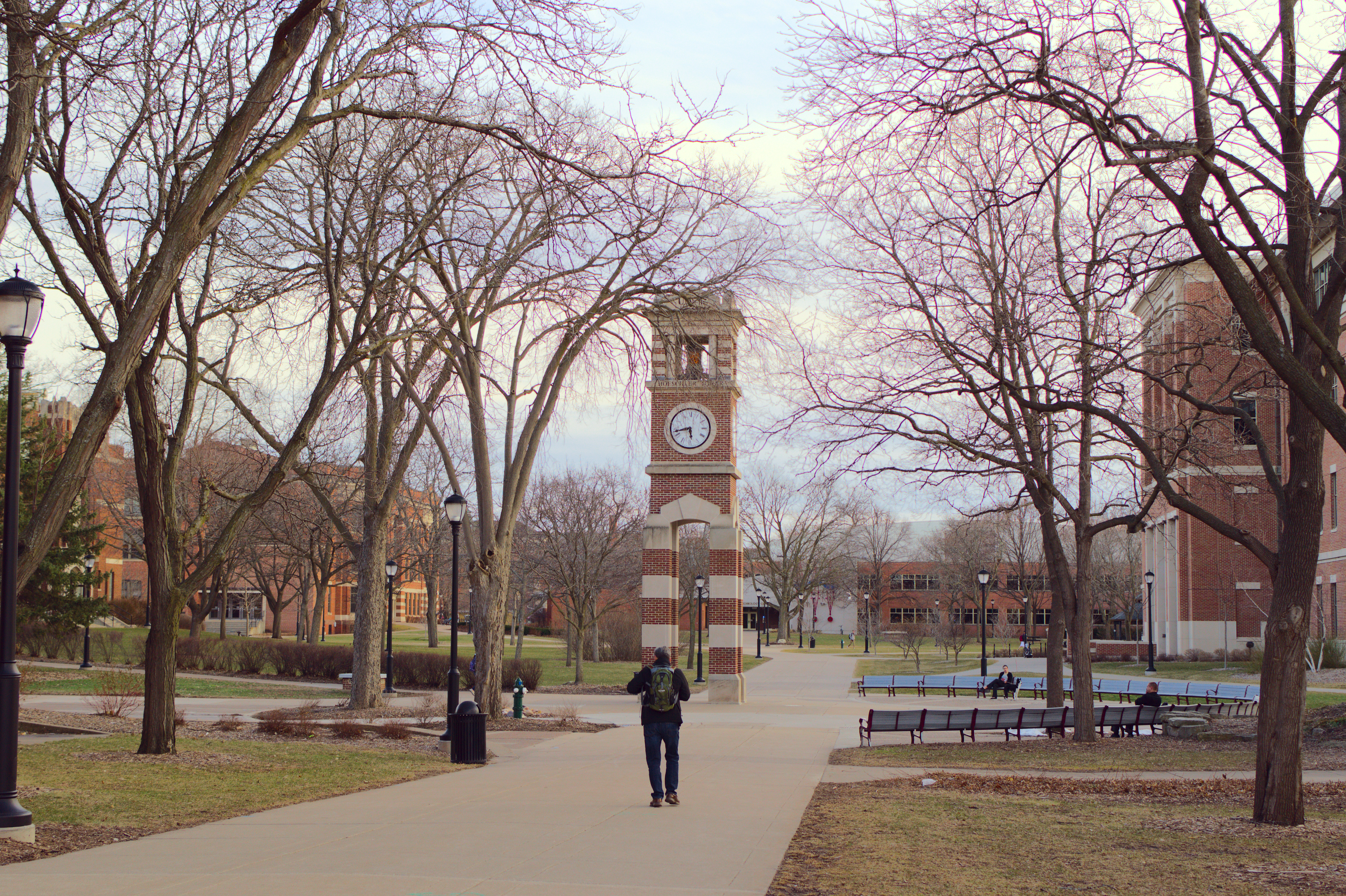
Hoeschler Tower

==== Maurice O. Graff Main Hall ====
Graff Main Hall is the oldest building on campus built in 1909 and contains the chancellor's office, a 787-seat auditorium, classrooms, the departments of Philosophy, Psychology, and Modern Languages, and other administrative and student services offices. It was designated a historic site by the city of La Crosse, Wisconsin in 1984 and is on the National Register of Historic Places as the Main Hall/La Crosse State Normal School.

==== Wittich Hall ====
Built in 1916, the original physical education building housed faculty and staff offices, gymnasiums, a track, multipurpose and meeting rooms, a strength training center, a therapeutic/rehabilitation swimming pool, the Musculoskeletal Research Center, and the Special Populations Exercise Program. The building has been renovated for use in the preparation of special/adapted physical education teachers and therapeutic recreation specialists. Administrative, faculty, staff, and graduate assistant offices for the Department of Recreation Management and Therapeutic Recreation are located in Wittich Hall. The building is also the primary practice site for the Women's Intercollegiate Athletics Gymnastics team. Wittich Hall, the Physical Education Building of the La Crosse State Normal School, was listed in the National Register of Historic Places in 1985 as the Physical Education Building/La Crosse State Normal School. In fall 2020, Wittich Hall was re-opened as the home of the College of Business Administration.

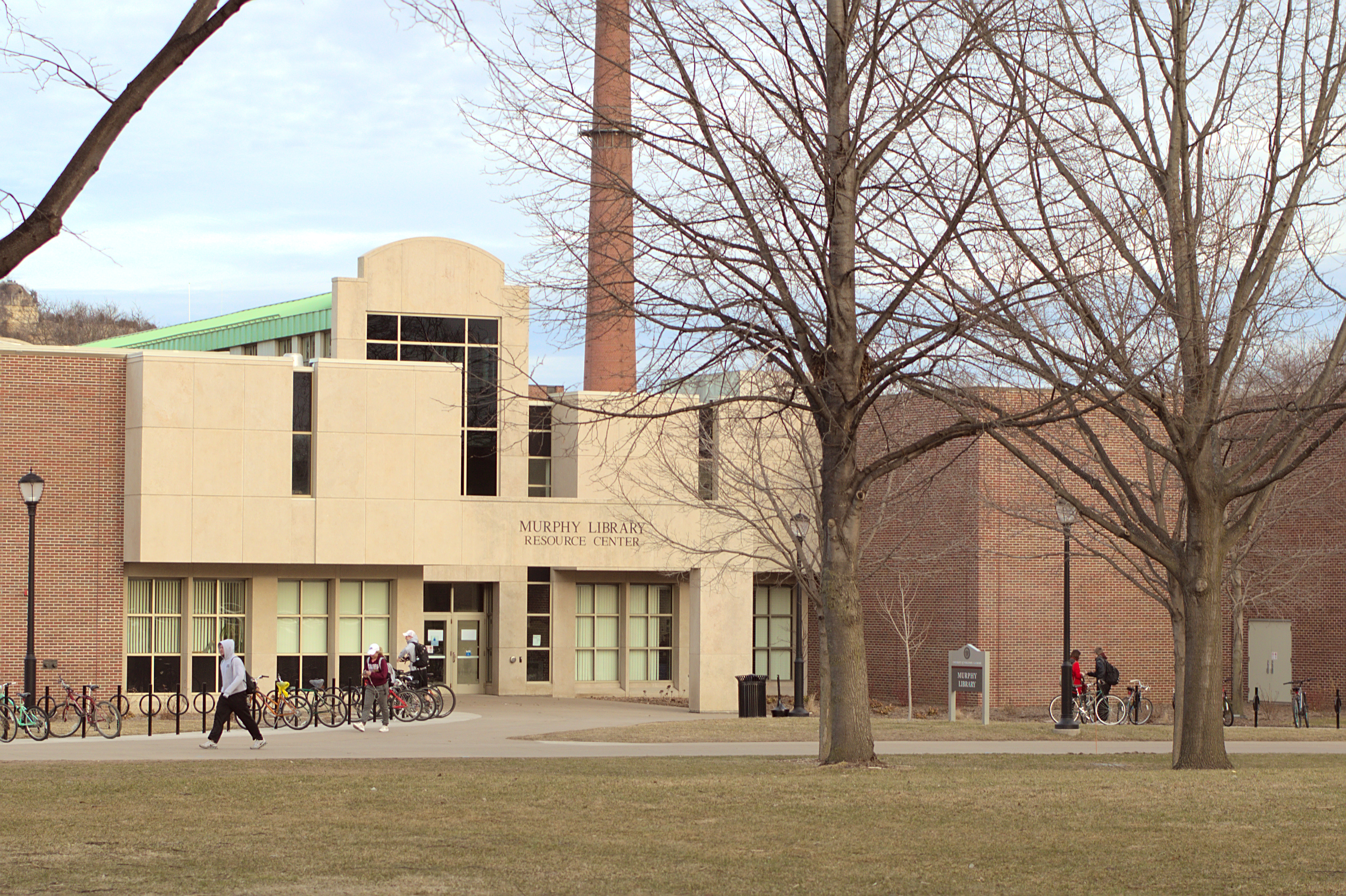
Eugene W. Murphy Library

==== Thomas Morris Hall ====
Morris Hall (1939, 1966, remodeled 1996) first opened in January 1940 as the La Crosse State Teachers College Training School Building. Today, Morris Hall houses the instructional and administrative facilities for the School of Education, including the Department of Educational Studies, the Master of Education-Professional Development Program (ME-PD), the Learning Communities Programs, the Office of Student Teaching and Internships, the Office of Continuing Education and Extension, and the Frederick Theater. Morris Hall is on the National Register of Historic Places.

==== Eugene W. Murphy Library ====
Murphy Library (1969, remodeled 1995), is centrally located on campus. It was named for Eugene W. Murphy in recognition of his 22 years of service to UWL and the University of Wisconsin System Board of Regents. At the time of its construction, the library cost US $2.5 million to construct. As of 2007, Murphy Library had a total of 691,282 books, bound periodicals, and government documents.

==== Truman T. Lowe Center for the Arts ====
Built in 1973, the Center for the Arts was named for UWL alumnus and Ho-Chunk artist Truman T. Lowe in 2022. The Lowe Center for the Arts serves as UWL's hub for creative activity, housing the Departments of Art, Music, and Theatre and Dance. As such, the building is home to the University Gallery, Annette Recital Hall, and Toland Theatre. The University Gallery hosts exhibits by students, faculty, and professional guests. Many of UWL's music ensembles, faculty, students, and professional musicians regularly perform in the Annette Recital Hall. The Toland Theatre is the site of five of the Department of Theatre and Dance's seven annual full-scale theatrical productions. Additional facilities include 20 practice rooms, rehearsal halls, a second student gallery space, ceramics studio, digital art studio, metals studio, painting studio, drawing studio, sculpture studio, music listening lab, sound design and mixing lab, offices, scenic shop, and costume shop and storage.

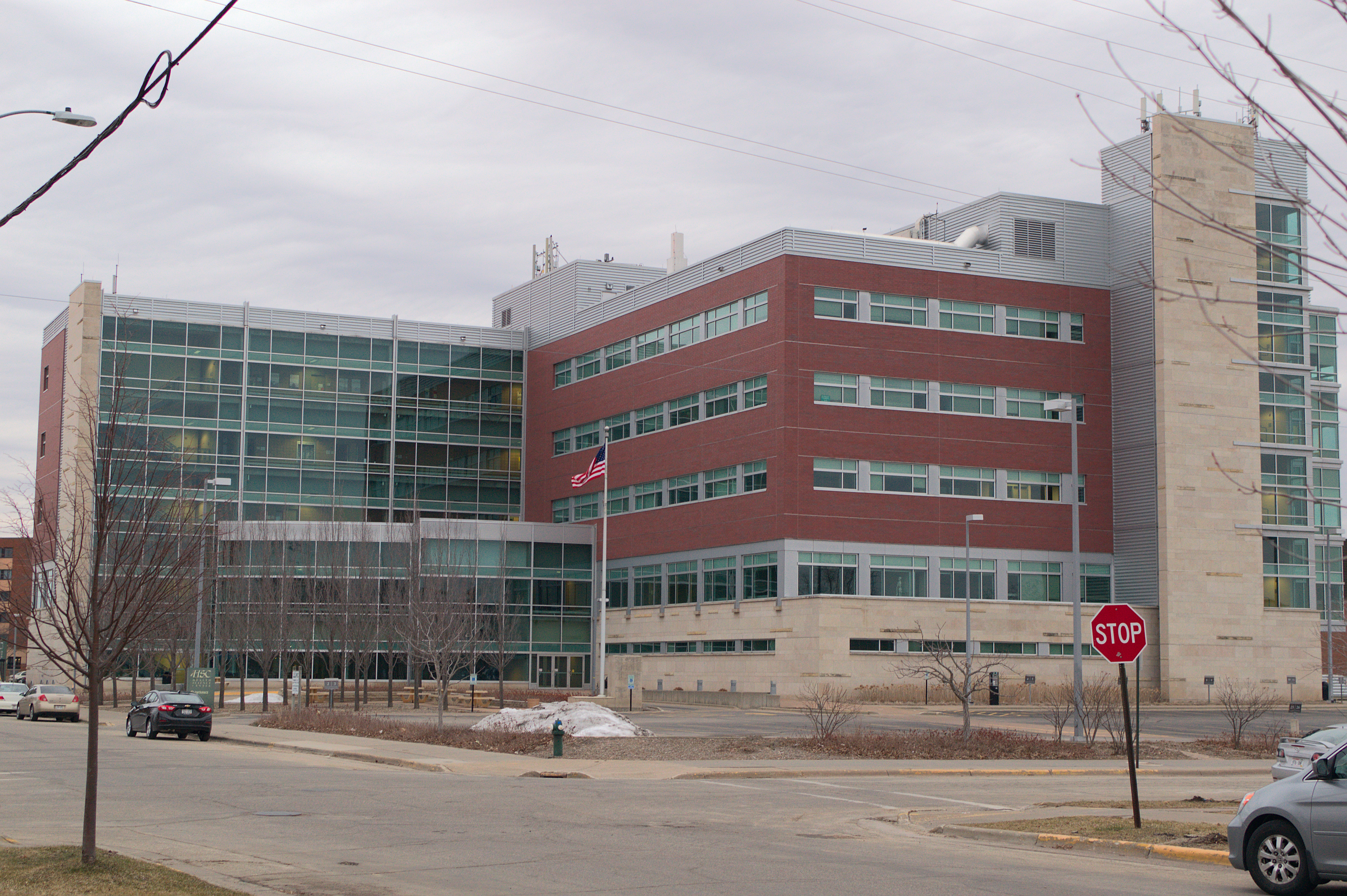
The Health Science Center, completed in 2000

==== Health Science Center ====
Built in 2000, the $27 million Health Science Center was a project of the La Crosse Medical Health Science Consortium. The building includes laboratory facilities for the medical laboratory science, nuclear medicine technology, occupational and physical therapy, physician assistant, and radiation therapy programs.

==== Cleary Alumni and Friends Center ====
The Cleary Alumni and Friends Center was built in 1995 by the University of Wisconsin–La Crosse Foundation and donated to the university. Members of both the university and the greater La Crosse community meet and take advantage of the conference center, smaller conference rooms, and large banquet hall. The Cleary Center houses the University of Wisconsin–La Crosse Foundation offices and the Alumni and University Relations advancement offices.

==== Centennial Hall ====
Built in 2011, Centennial Hall was the first academic building to be open on campus since 1974. It is located in the center of campus and holds 46 classrooms, including two 250-seat auditoriums, various academic and student advising departments. A large, open entryway in the building opens up to the Hall of Nations. The room houses flags from 44 countries, representing the diversity of UWL's international students. Centennial Hall also houses a counseling and testing center and offices for communications, environmental studies, philosophy, and women's and gender studies.

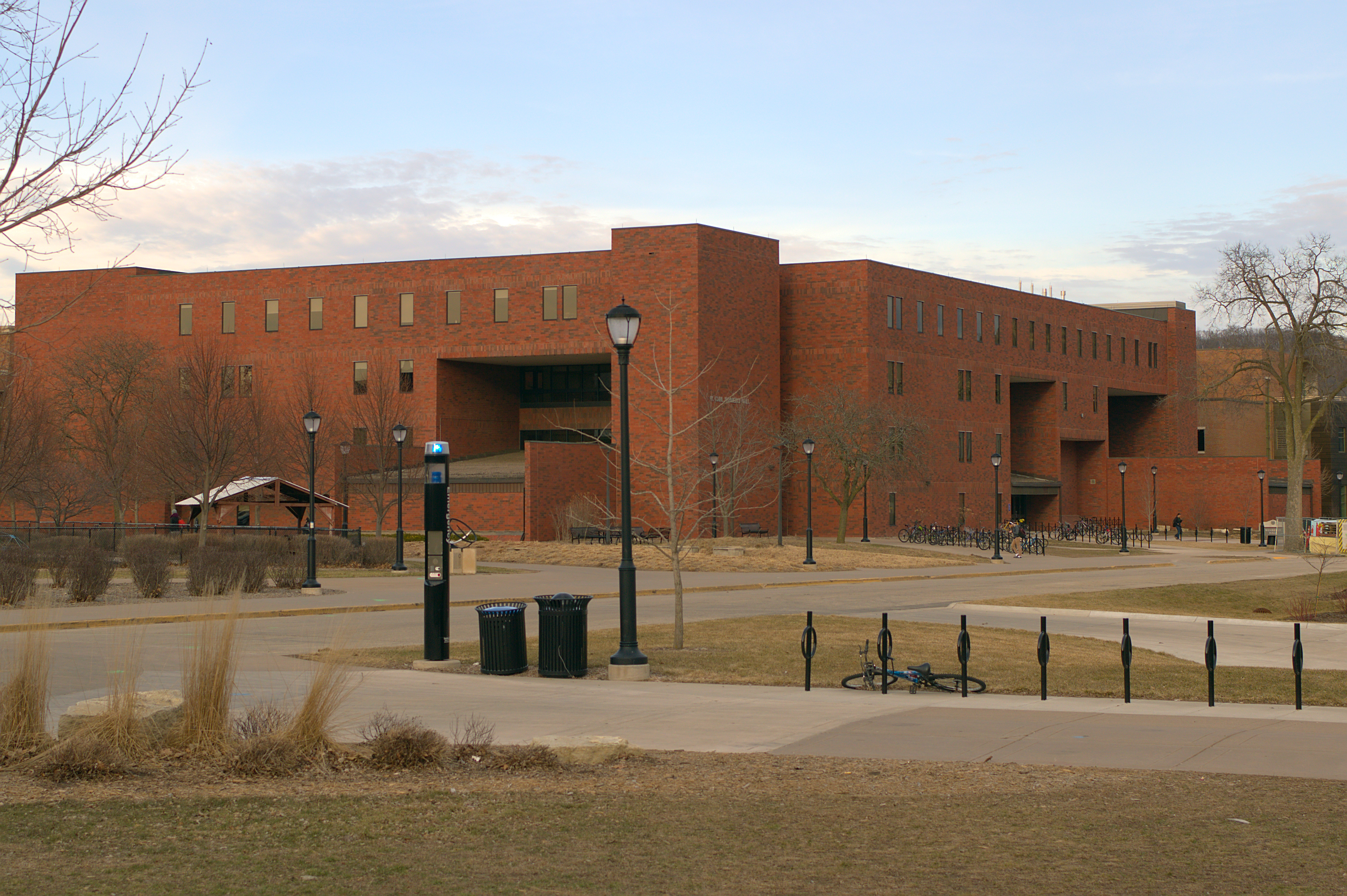
Wimberly Hall

==== W. Carl Wimberly Hall ====
Completed in 1974 and originally called "North Hall", in 2000 this building was named for former professor and Dean of the College of Arts, Letters and Sciences, W. Carl Wimberly. The building has classrooms, three auditoriums, and the offices of the College of Business Administration, the accounting, archeology, sociology, economics, English, ethnic and racial studies, finance, history, management, marketing, political science and public administration departments, and the Small Business Development Center.

==== Prairie Springs Science Center ====
The newest academic building on campus, the Prairie Springs Science Center was completed in 2018 for $84 million. The 189,000 square foot building contains 36 instructional labs and 23 research labs that support the university's biology, biochemistry, chemistry, earth science, geography, microbiology, and physics programs. A $2 million endowment, the largest single gift in UW-L history, was donated by Carolyn and Jay Scott in support of the new science building.

In May 2026 construction broke ground on phase two of the Prairie Springs Science Center. The $92.8 million expansion includes the demolition of Cowley Hall and connecting the new facility to the 2018 Science Center building.

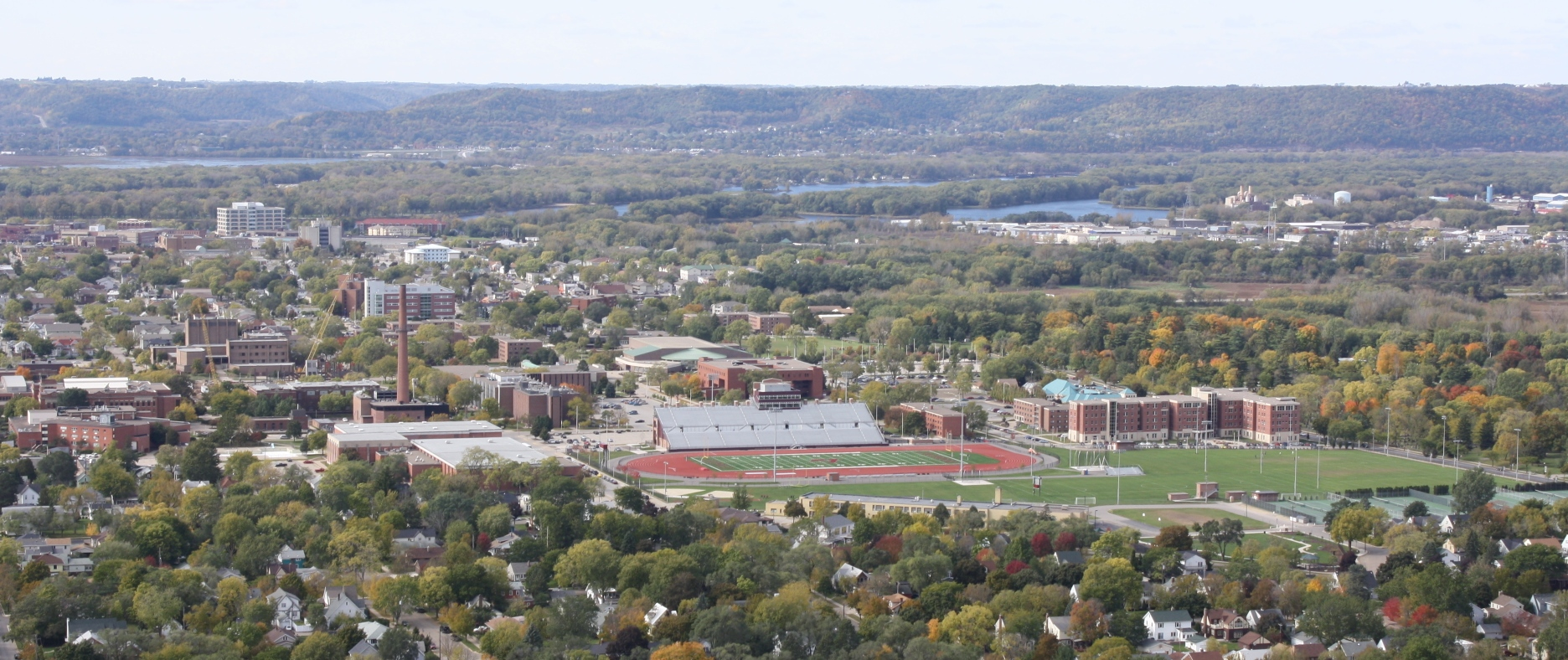
Looking down on the campus from Grandad Bluff

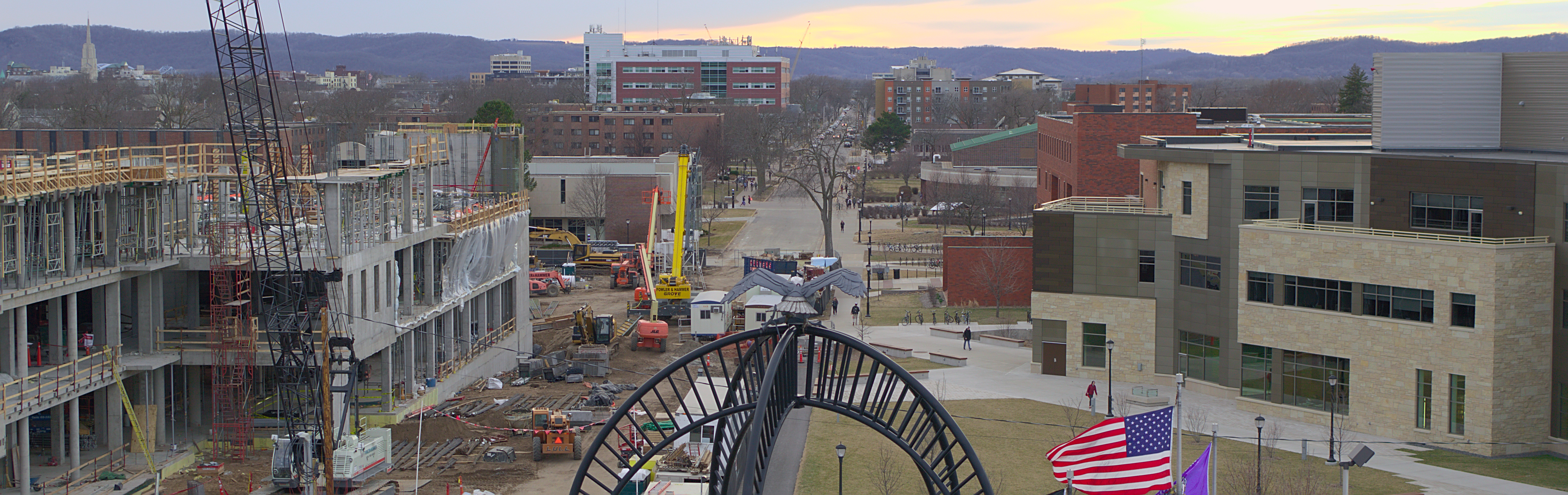
Left to right: Cowley Science Building, Eugene W. Murphy Library, Drake Hall, Health and Science Center, Recreational Eagle Center, Wimberly Hall, and the U. In the top left is the skyline of downtown La Crosse.

== Academics ==
UW–La Crosse offers 102 undergraduate programs in 44 disciplines, 30 graduate programs in eight disciplines, and 2 doctoral programs. Microbiology and exercise and sport science are designated as UW System Centers of Excellence, and the College of Business Administration holds international accreditation. UW–La Crosse also offers Wisconsin's only nationally accredited degrees in recreation management and therapeutic recreation, the UW System's only nuclear medicine technology program, and offers one of two Midwest undergraduate archaeology majors.

=== Colleges and schools ===
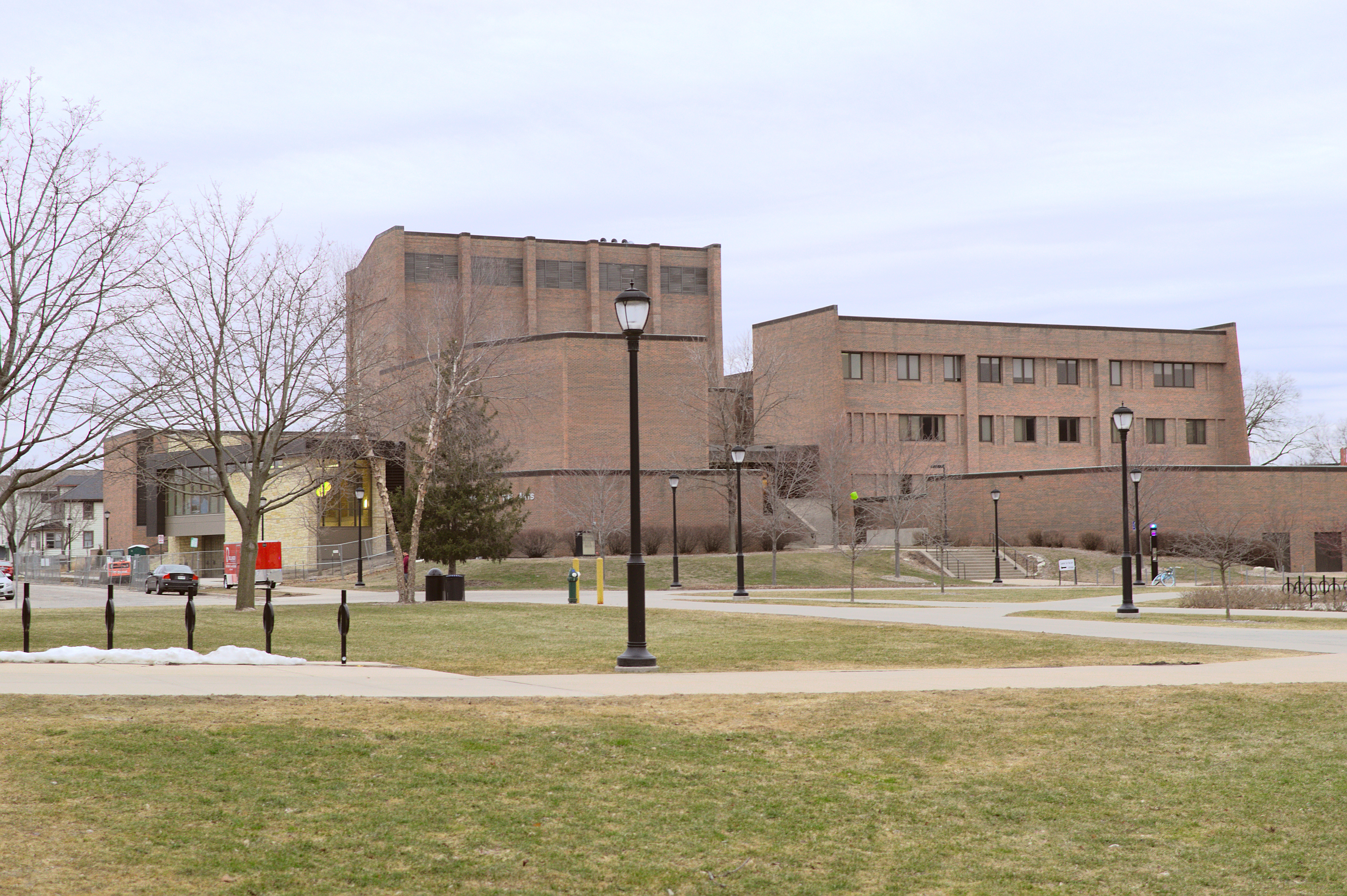
Truman T. Lowe Center for the Arts

The university is organized into three colleges and two schools: the College of Arts, Social Sciences, & Humanities; College of Business Administration; School of Education; College of Science and Health; and School of Visual and Performing Arts.

There are a wide variety of undergraduate and two graduate degree programs that comprise the College of Arts, Social Sciences, and Humanities.

The College of Business Administration is professionally accredited by the Association to Advance Collegiate Schools of Business. It provides undergraduate programs along with a consortial graduate program in business administration.

The School of Education contains teacher education programs housed in a variety of departments and colleges across the university. Teacher education programs are reviewed by the Wisconsin Department of Instruction (DPI).

The College of Science and Health accounts for just over half of UWL's total enrollment. The 11 departments of the college offer 47 undergraduate and 14 graduate degree programs. In addition to a degree 14 pre-professional programs are offered. The Athletic Training, Chemistry, Clinical Laboratory Science, Medical Dosimetry, Nuclear Medicine Technology, Occupational Therapy, Physical Therapy, Physician Assistant, Radiation Therapy, Recreation Management, Public Health and Therapeutic Recreation programs are all fully accredited. The college also offers a Doctor of Physical Therapy (DPT) degree which was ranked #39 in the nation by U.S. News & World Report. The doctoral offering is a 34-month program with roughly 45 students.

==== Partnerships ====
UW–La Crosse partners with the University of Wisconsin–Madison, the University of Wisconsin–Milwaukee, the University of Wisconsin–Platteville, and the University of Minnesota in a program that allows students to complete three years of study at UWL before transferring to the partnership university for two years to complete the science or engineering portion of a dual degree.

=== Undergraduate admissions ===
Undergraduate admissions statistics
- 2023 entering class
- Admit rate: 79.90%
- Yield rate: 42.76%

Test scores middle 50%
- ACT Composite: 21–27 (among 36% of FTFs)

Undergraduate admission to UW–La Crosse is classified as "selective" by the Carnegie Classification of Institutions of Higher Education. The Princeton Review gives UW–La Crosse an "Admissions Selectivity Rating" of 84. The university extends offers of admission to, on average, around 80% of all applicants yearly after holistic review that includes examination of academic rigor, recommendations, essays, and high school performance, and admissions test scores, when submitted.

Incoming freshmen average an ACT score of 25 and a median high school class rank in the 80th percentile, the second highest academic profile in the UW System. In fall 2023, 60 high school valedictorians were represented in the incoming freshman class. UW–La Crosse also bolstered an 86.5% retention rate of 2022-23 first-year freshman returning to UWL their next year, the second highest in the UW System after the University of Wisconsin–Madison.

=== Rankings and recognition ===
Academic rankings

Regional
- U.S. News & World Report: 28

National
- Forbes: 444
- Washington Monthly: 297

In the 2025 U.S. News & World Report college rankings, the University of Wisconsin–La Crosse was ranked 28th out of 165 regional master's universities in the Midwest. In 2014 Kiplinger's Personal Finance, ranked the university fourth on its list of the "25 Best College Values Under $30,000 a Year".

== Student life ==
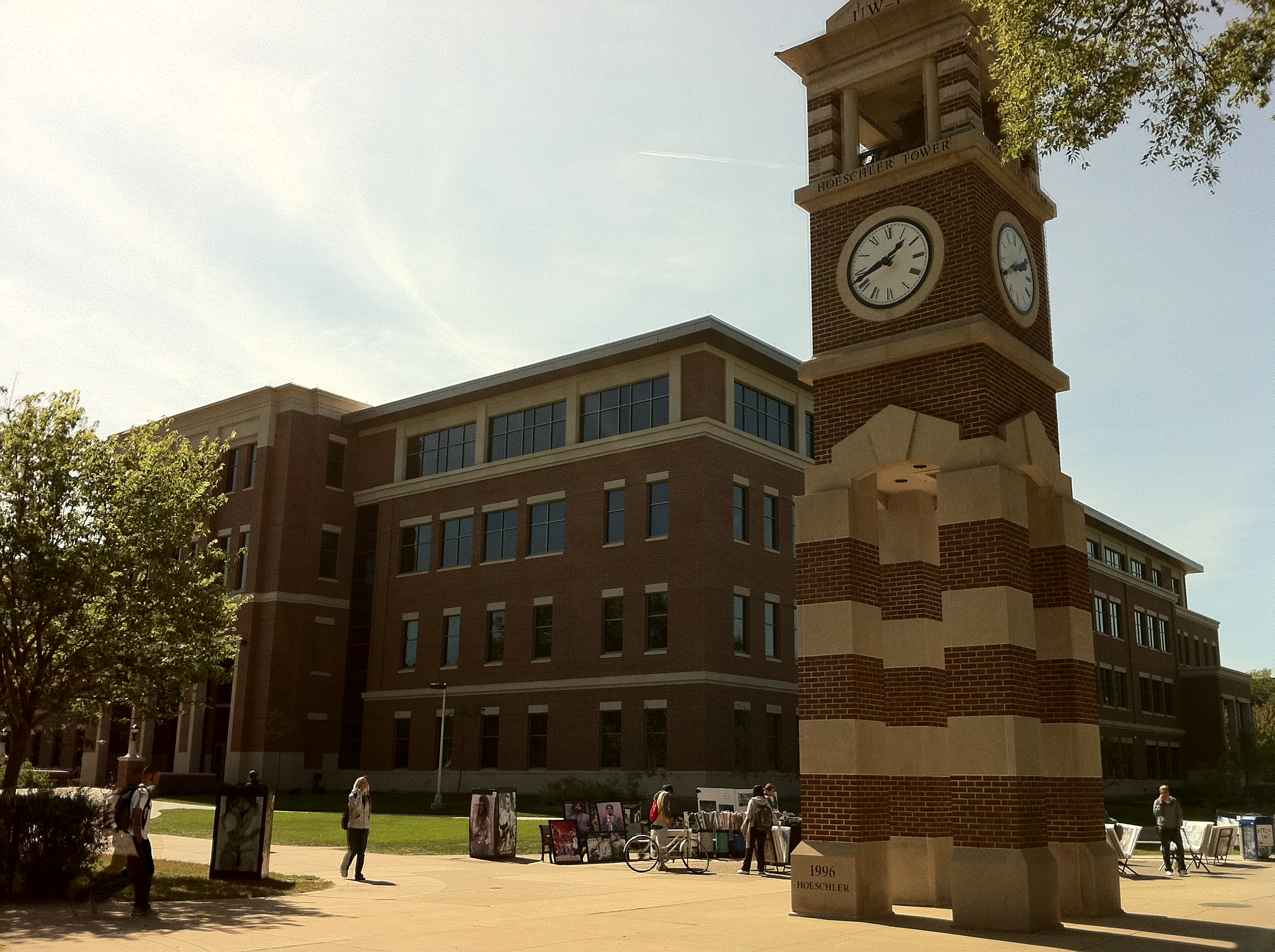
Hoeschler Tower and Centennial Hall

As of the fall 2023 semester, UW-La Crosse enrollment stood at 10,327 with 9,406 undergraduate students, 921 graduate students representing 36 states and international students representing 30 countries.

UW-La Crosse offers over 175 different student organizations in a wide range of areas, including academic, religious, cultural, athletic, political, social, and other organizations. Intramural sports programs are also available to students. The Physical Education Club, which was formed in 1912, is the longest-continuously operating organization at the school.

Greek life plays a small role at UWL. Only about 1% of men and 1% of women in the student body are members of a social fraternity or sorority. Delta Sigma Phi is the only Greek organization on campus with a fraternity house.

=== Media ===
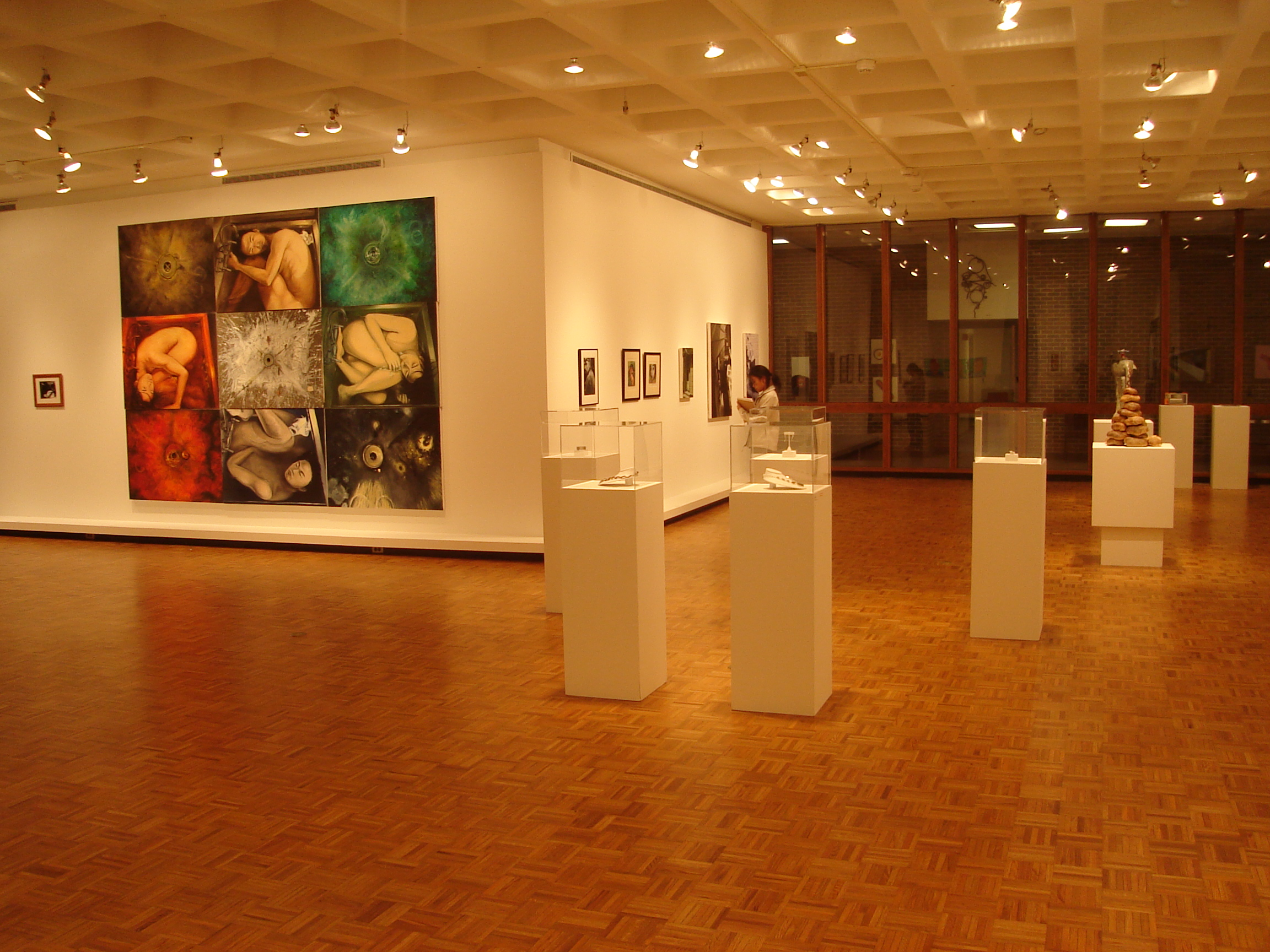
Student artwork on display at the University Art Gallery

The Racquet Press is UWL's student news source. The paper, which began in 1910, contains student-produced articles about campus, community, state, and national events. The Racquet Press is composed of five major sections: news, sports, letters to the editor, photo series, and humans of UWL. The majority of The Racquet Press' budget is contributed via student fees or from advertising. In 2013, The Racquet Press was ranked #32 in the nation and #1 in Wisconsin in the Top 100 College Newspapers for Journalism Students.

The Second Supper was a satirical newspaper that was published by students.

The Catalyst is a student-produced and edited publication of a student-submitted collection of original essays, short stories, and poetry. Each edition has a different theme. The Catalyst intends to provide a channel for creative intellectual inquiry to provoke campus and community discussion.

== Traditions ==
=== The Eagle mascot ===
The university's school colors are maroon and gray. The university mascot, which was adopted in 1989, is the Eagle. UWL men's athletics teams had previously been known as the Indians (1937–1989), Red Raiders, Hurricanes, Racqueteers, and Peds and Maroons. The women's athletic teams were known as the Roonies, derived from the university's school colors of maroon and gray, since the inception of female intercollegiate competition in the early 1970s until November 1990 when they also adopted the Eagle mascot. Since the adoption of the Eagle mascot, the band's mascot has been the Screaming Eagle, having previously been known as the Marching Chiefs.

Women's teams started sporting the Eagles moniker in November 1990. The UWL Eagle mascot was named "Colbert" in a vote by students during the 2008–2009 school year. On October 10, 2012, Colbert was retired, and a new similar looking mascot was introduced, named Stryker.

Memorial Gazebo

=== Hanging of the Lantern ===
The Hanging of the Lantern tradition dates back to 1913 when UWL students hung small lanterns in house windows near campus. In 1931, longtime faculty member Orris O. White began a tradition of hanging one large lantern in the Maurice O. Graff Main Hall tower, above the building's south entrance. The act welcomed alumni who had returned home. "We'll hang the lantern in the old college tower over the south door. You won't need to look for the key—the door will be open," declared White.

Since 1931, a lantern has hung each Homecoming. It hung on the south side of Graff Main Hall until 1997 when it was moved to the Hoeschler Tower in the center of campus. The tower's lantern hangs year-round and is lit every evening at dusk.

=== Lighting of the "L" ===
The Lighting of the "L" tradition began after a 1935 college prank. Bored on a foggy day, F. Clark Carnes and Bernie Brown hiked up Miller's Bluff, north of Grandad Bluff. They gathered and piled brush in the shape of a 30-foot (9.1 m) by 15-foot (4.6 m) "L", started it on fire, and slipped down the bluff toward campus before police could locate them. When Brown and Carnes reached Veterans Memorial Stadium, the fog lifted and allowed the crowd to see the "L". In recent years, the "L" has been lit by electricity and shines from Grandad Bluff.

== Athletics ==
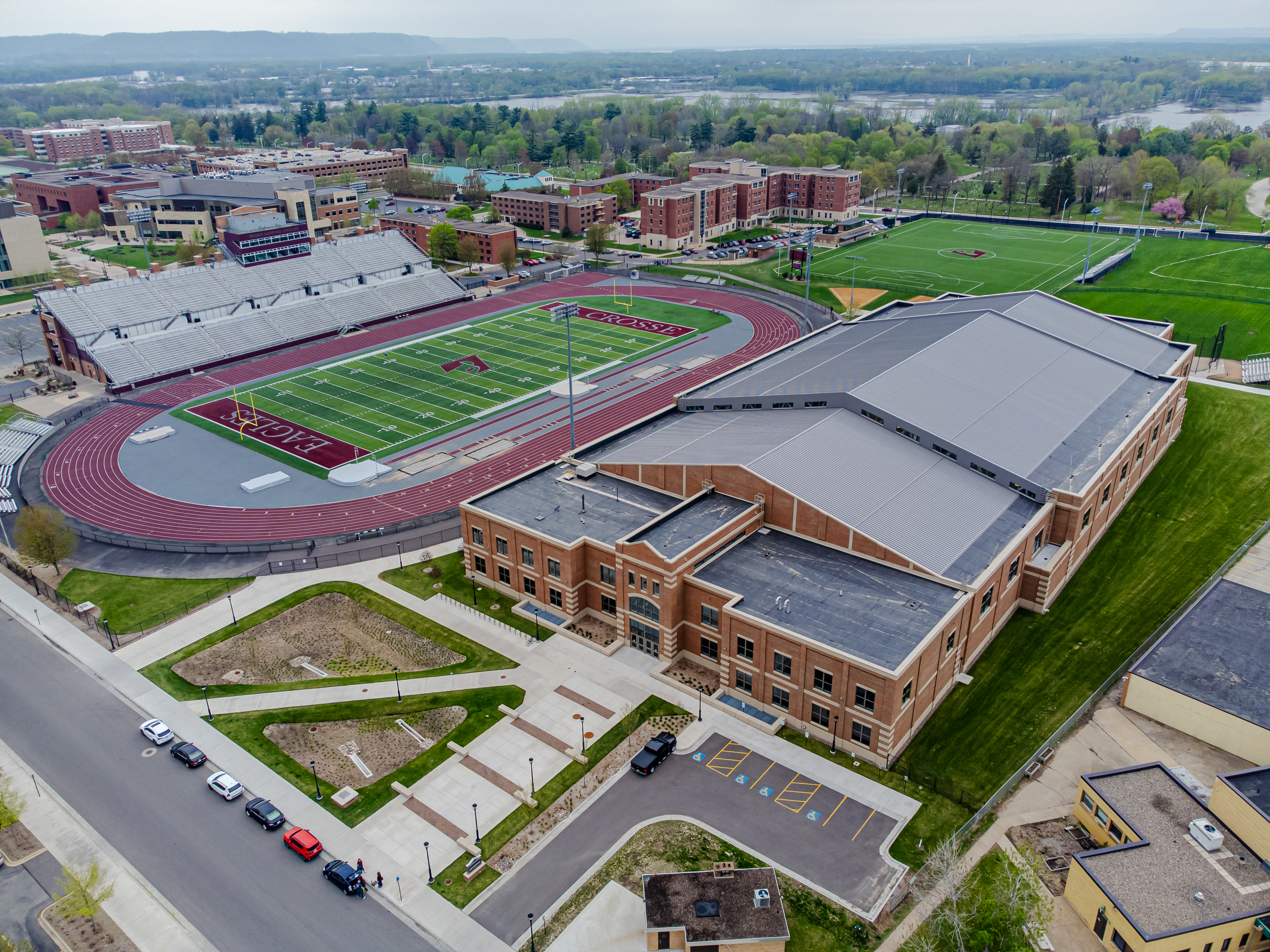
Veterans Memorial Stadium (left) and Hetzel Fieldhouse

The University of Wisconsin–La Crosse maintains programs in several sports including indoor and outdoor track, cross country, gymnastics, and football, competing in the Wisconsin Intercollegiate Athletic Conference (WIAC), which is in NCAA Division III. UWL holds membership affiliation with the National Collegiate Athletic Association, the Association of Intercollegiate Athletics for Women, the National Association of Intercollegiate Athletics, and the National Collegiate Gymnastics Association.

UWL has student-athletes participating on 19 teams that have won 72 national titles. UWL has also won 391 Wisconsin Intercollegiate Athletic Conference championships. UWL is one of only six institutions in NCAA Division III history to finish in the top 20 all 10 years of the Directors' Cup, which includes all 433 NCAA Division III schools. The Eagles had 203 All-WIAC honors in 2005–2006.

The UWL football team plays its home games at Veterans Memorial Stadium. The Eagles have won 34 WIAC titles and 3 national titles, the NAIA Division II title in 1985 and the NCAA Division III titles in 1992 and 1995. In 2009 The football stadium and outdoor track were replaced by a new timed outdoor track, a football turf field, a new 10,000+ seat stadium/press box/field lights, plus surrounding soccer/athletic fields.

== See also ==
- Viterbo University
- Western Technical College
