= Ralph Poston =

American politician (1923–2009)

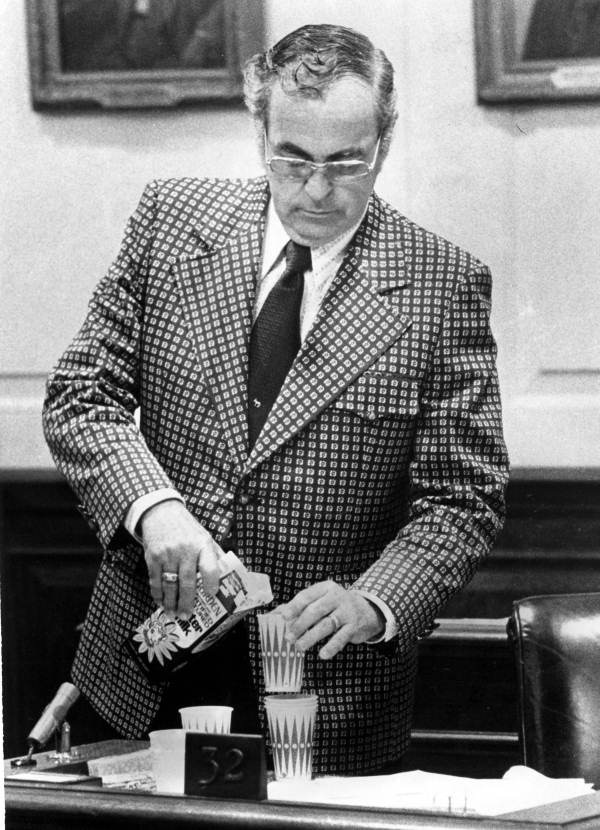
- Poston in 1972

Member of the Florida House of Representatives from Dade County
- In office 1965–1966

Member of the Florida Senate from the 46th district
- In office 1966–1972
- Preceded by: District established
- Succeeded by: District eliminated

Member of the Florida Senate from the 38th district
- In office 1972–1978

Personal details
- Born: January 2, 1923
- Died: March 20, 2009 (aged 86)
- Party: Democratic
- Children: 3
- Education: University of Houston

Ralph Richard Poston (January 2, 1923 – March 20, 2009) was an American politician. He served as a Democratic Party member of the Florida House of Representatives. He also served as a member for the 38th and 46th district of the Florida Senate.

== Life and career ==
Poston attended Andrew Jackson High School and the University of Houston. He served in the United States Navy during World War II.

In 1965, Poston was elected to the Florida House of Representatives, serving until 1966. In the same year, he was elected to represent the 46th district of the Florida Senate, serving until 1972, when he was elected to represent the 38th district, serving until 1978.

Poston died in March 2009, at the age of 86.
