= Ernest Roddenberry =

American politician (1905–1971)

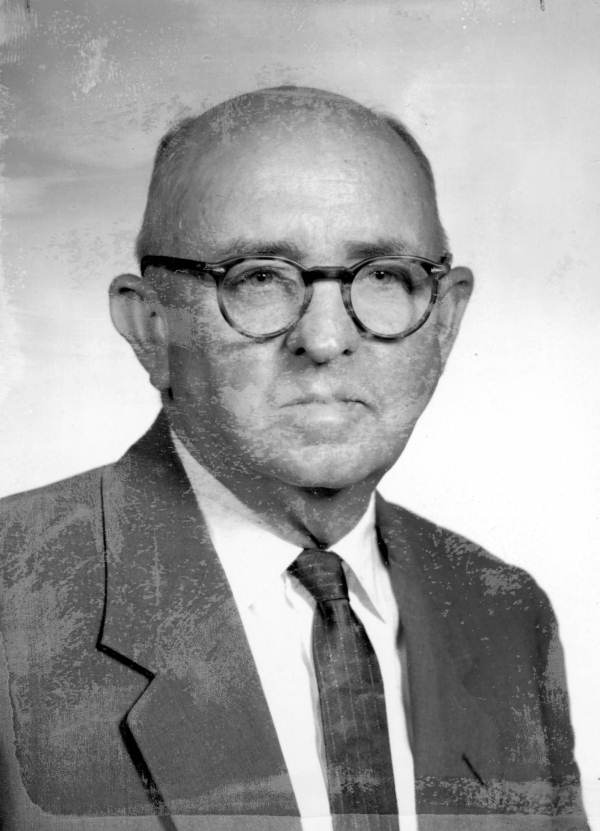
- Roddenberry in 1966

Member of the Florida House of Representatives from Wakulla County
- In office 1965–1966

Personal details
- Born: December 6, 1905
- Died: July 1971 (aged 65)
- Party: Democratic
- Education: Jacksonville Business College

Ernest Roddenberry (December 6, 1905 – July 1971) was an American politician. He served as a Democratic member of the Florida House of Representatives.

== Life and career ==
Roddenberry attended Jacksonville Business College.

Roddenberry was a Wakulla County merchant.

In 1965, Roddenberry was elected to the Florida House of Representatives, serving until 1966.

Roddenberry died in July 1971, at the age of 65.
