= Max Wilks =

American politician

M. Max Wilks
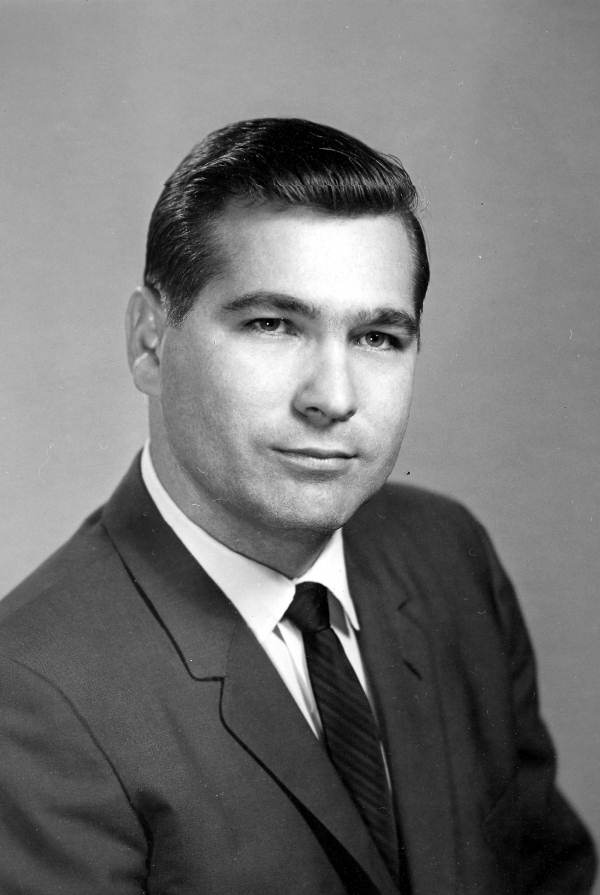

Member of the Florida House of Representatives for Santa Rosa County
- In office 1965–1966

Personal details
- Born: Marion Max Wilks; February 9, 1936 Milton, Florida, U.S.
- Died: July 20, 2023 (aged 87)
- Party: Democratic
- Occupation: electrical engineering and construction

Marion Max Wilks (February 9, 1936 – July 20, 2023) was an American politician in the state of Florida.

Wilks was born in Milton, Florida and attended Auburn University. He worked in electrical engineering and construction. Wilks served in the Florida House of Representatives from 1965 to 1966, as a Democrat, representing Santa Rosa County.
