= United States Junior Chamber =

Leadership training and civic organization for young people

- Founded: January 21, 1920; 106 years ago
- Type: NGO
- Fields: Individual, Community, International, Business
- Website: https://www.jciusa.org/

The United States Junior Chamber, also known as the Jaycees, JCs or JCI USA, is a leadership training service organization and civic organization for people between the ages of 18 and 40. It is a branch of Junior Chamber International (JCI). Areas of emphasis are business development, management skills, individual training, community service, and international connections. The U.S. Junior Chamber is a not-for-profit corporation/organization as described under Internal Revenue Code 501(c)(4).

Established as the United States Junior Chamber of Commerce on January 21, 1920, it provided opportunities for young men to develop personal and leadership skills through service to others. The Jaycees later expanded to include women after the United States Supreme Court ruled in the 1984 case Roberts v. United States Jaycees that Minnesota could prohibit sex discrimination in private organizations. The following year, 1985, marked the final year of the U.S. Jaycee Women (also known as Jayceettes or Jayceens), an organization that lasted 10 years and at its convention in 1984 in Atlanta boasted 59,000 members.

At its membership peak in 1976, the U.S. Jaycees boasted a membership total of 356,000 men between the ages of 18 and 36. Rules were later changed to allow members to stay active until age 40.

== Jaycee Creed ==
The Jaycee Creed was adopted in 1946 at the United States Junior Chamber of Commerce National Convention.

The code reads as follows:

- We believe:
  - That faith in God gives meaning and purpose to human life.
  - That the brotherhood of man transcends the sovereignty of nations.
  - That economic justice can best be won by free men through free enterprise.
  - That government should be of laws rather than of men.
  - That earth's great treasure lies in human personality.
  - And that service to humanity is the best work of life.

== Notable U.S. Jaycees ==
- Larry Bird – professional basketball player (Boston Celtics)
- Warren E. Burger – Chief Justice of the United States
- Bill Clinton – President of the United States
- Cal Cunningham – North Carolina State Senator
- Tim Flakoll - ND State Senator and Provost Emeritus
- Gerald Ford – President of the United States
- Wendell Ford – U.S. Senator, Governor of Kentucky, also served as U.S. Jaycees President
- John Wayne Gacy – clown, businessman and serial killer, served Jaycees for many years and helped organize prison chapters in Iowa's Anamosa State Penitentiary, where he served 18 months of a 10 year sentence for sodomy
- Bill Gates – Chairman of Microsoft
- Al Gore – Vice President of the United States
- Mike Gravel - US Senator from Alaska, conducted national Jaycee tour advocating tax reform and free enterprise in 1958
- Larry Holmes – Former Heavyweight Boxing Champion
- Rogers Hornsby – Hall of Fame Major League Baseball player
- Howard Hughes – industrialist
- Hubert Humphrey – Vice President of the United States
- Bradley Joseph – composer and recording artist
- Edmund Kemper – serial killer known as the “Coed Killer”; became a member of the Jaycees while incarcerated
- Charles Lindbergh – aviator
- Tom Monaghan – founder of Domino's Pizza
- Walter Mondale – Vice President of the United States
- Richard Nixon – President of the United States
- Kaye Lani Rae Rafko-Wilson – Miss America 1988
- John Jacob Rhodes – U.S. Representative from Arizona
- Charles Thone – Governor of Nebraska; served as Nebraska state Jaycee president
- Robert Van Pelt - United States District Judge, drafter of the Federal Rules of Evidence
- Clyde Simpson - Member of the Florida House of Representatives from Duval County from 1965-1966.
- Jake Hoot - Season 17 The Voice Winner
- Frank White - Governor of Arkansas

Other notable persons that treasured the Jaycees:

- Elvis Presley – musician, actor
- Ronald Reagan – President of the United States; Governor of California; twice served as President of Screen Actors Guild; actor

== See also ==
- Lions Club
- Rotary International
