= Louis L. Huntley =

American politician (1928–2006)

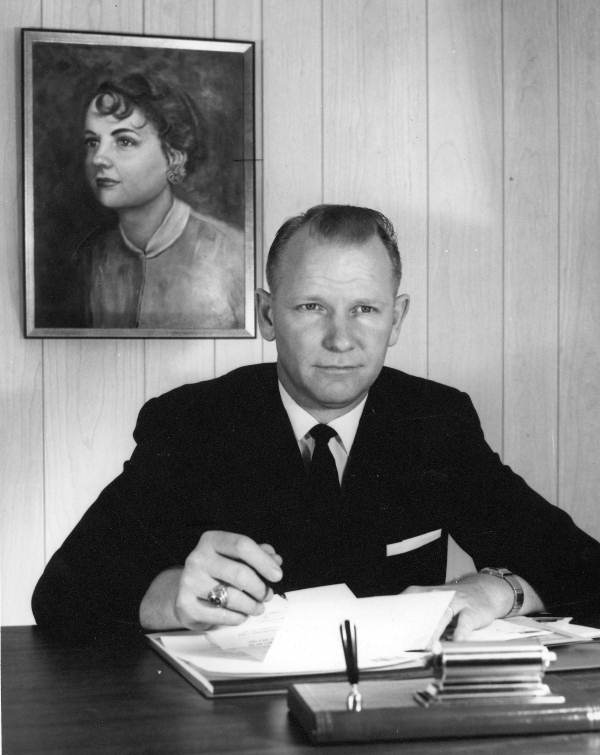
- Huntley in 1965

Member of the Florida House of Representatives from Clay County
- In office 1965–1966

Personal details
- Born: January 8, 1928 Clay County, Florida, U.S.
- Died: July 12, 2006 (aged 78)
- Party: Democratic
- Spouse: Mary Huntley (m. 1952)
- Education: University of Florida

Louis L. Huntley (January 8, 1928 – July 12, 2006) was an American politician. He served as a Democratic member of the Florida House of Representatives.

== Life and career ==
Huntley was born in Clay County, Florida, the son of Edith Lillian Hill and Frank T. Huntley. He attended Clay County High School and the University of Florida.

In 1965, Huntley was elected to the Florida House of Representatives, serving until 1966.

Huntley died on July 12, 2006, at the age of 78.
