= Nexus degree =

Undergraduate degree in Georgia, US

A nexus degree is an undergraduate degree awarded in Georgia, United States, after a course of post-secondary study. It is a level of qualification with hour requirements comparable to an associate degree. However, it incorporates an internship or apprenticeship requirement as well as a number of upper-division specialization courses that are more typical for a bachelor's degree or master's degree. The nexus degree can serve as a first degree or a professional degree depending on the context.

The nexus degree was introduced in the state of Georgia in 2020. It is the first new accredited degree type introduced in the United States since associate degrees were first awarded in 1898. It was designed to create more flexibility in higher education, compete with professional certifications and microcredentials, make career transitions easier, and offer more specialization for traditional students wanting to enter high-demand fields.

== History ==
The nexus degree was developed as part of the University System of Georgia's College 2025 initiative. The initiative was launched in 2017 by USG chancellor Steve Wrigley. The goal of the initiative was to create a plan to address concerns about the costs and quality of higher education as well as how well a college education prepares students for the workforce. The solutions explored by the College 2025 initiative were based on the research of USG chief academic officer Dr. Tristan Denley. To develop the new degree, the USG consulted and collaborated with university representatives, employers, and other stakeholders.

In 2018, Albany State University and Columbus State University were approved to become the first two schools in Georgia to offer the new degree type. Columbus State University began offering nexus degrees in Film Production and the Cybersecurity of Financial Technology beginning in January 2020. Columbus State awarded the first nexus degrees in December 2020 to two film production graduates.

In 2021, Georgia Gwinnett College offered its first nexus degree in professional sound design for film and television, and in 2022, expanded its nexus degree offerings to add motion picture set lighting, production design, production for film and television, and professional editing in film and television.

== Structure ==
The nexus degree is designed to serve as both a standalone, two-year degree program and as a stackable credential, depending on the needs of the student. Students pursuing a standalone degree are required to complete 42 general studies credit hours, 18 credit hours of specialized instruction, and six credit hours of paid internships or apprenticeships. The nexus degree requirements may also be transferred to or stacked with a bachelor's degree curriculum without the need to repeat core credit requirements.
