= Roger West (Florida politician) =

American politician

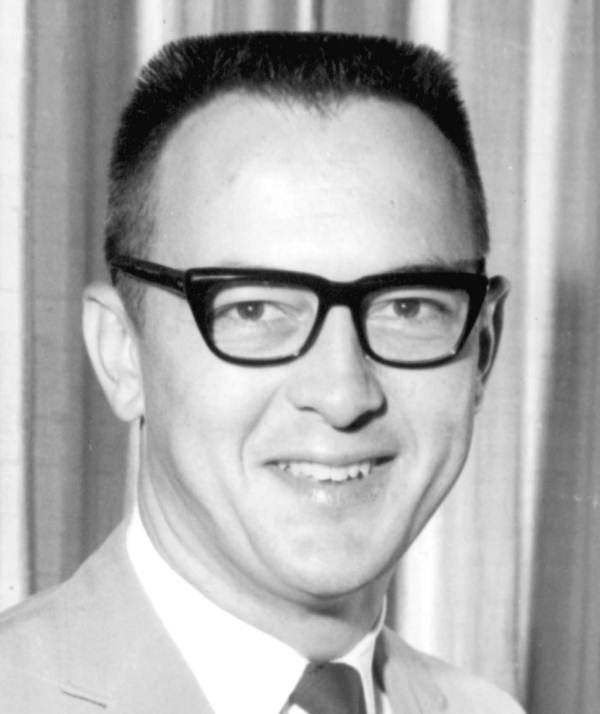
- West in 1968

Member of the Florida House of Representatives from the 18th district
- In office November 5, 1968 – November 3, 1970
- Preceded by: Dan Scarborough
- Succeeded by: Hugh Grainger

Personal details
- Born: January 13, 1936 (age 90) Denver, Colorado, U.S.
- Party: Democratic
- Education: Jacksonville University

Roger West (born January 13, 1936) is an American politician. He served as a Democratic member for the 18th district of the Florida House of Representatives.

== Life and career ==
West was born in Denver, Colorado. He attended Jacksonville University.

In 1968, West was elected to represent the 18th district of the Florida House of Representatives, succeeding Dan Scarborough. He served until 1970, when he was succeeded by Hugh Grainger.
