= Dan Jenkins (politician) =

American politician (1940–2007)

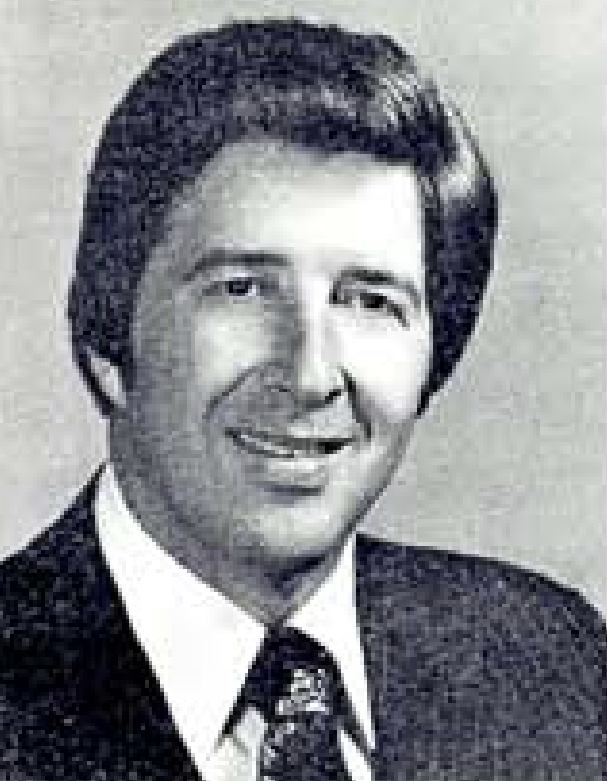

Member of the Florida Senate from the 7th district
- In office November 4, 1980 – November 2, 1982
- Preceded by: Dan Scarborough
- Succeeded by: Arnett Girardeau

Personal details
- Born: October 16, 1940 Los Angeles, California
- Died: November 18, 2007 (aged 67) Jacksonville, Florida
- Party: Democratic
- Spouse: Molly Sharp
- Children: 2
- Education: Tennessee Temple University (B.S.); California State University, Chico (M.A.); Luther Rice College & Seminary (Ed.D.)
- Occupation: Educator

Daniel L. Jenkins (October 16, 1940 – November 18, 2007) was a Democratic politician from Florida who served as a member of the Florida Senate from the 7th district from 1980 to 1982.

== Early life ==
Jenkins was born in Los Angeles and raised in Panama, where his parents were Christian missionaries. He moved to Florida in 1959, and later attended Tennessee Temple University, receiving his bachelor's degree in 1972. Jenkins graduated from California State University, Chico, with his master's degree in 1973, and the Luther Rice College & Seminary in 1975.

In Jacksonville, Jenkins was involved in the Evangelical Christian community, and served on the staff of the Luther Rice Seminary. He helped found several Christian schools.

== Florida Senate ==
In 1980, Jenkins challenged incumbent State Senator Dan Scarborough in the Democratic primary, as part of an electoral effort by Christian conservatives. He said that he had "been Republican all my life but I'm no fool. It'd be suicide to run as a Republican." Jenkins attacked Scarborough for supporting the Equal Rights Amendment, and late in the campaign, benefited from Scarborough's involvement in a sting operation undertaken by the Federal Bureau of Investigation. He defeated Scarborough in a landslide, receiving 70 percent of the vote to Scarborough's 30 percent.

In 1982, Jenkins ran for re-election in the 9th district, challenging fellow State Senator Mattox Hair for renomination in the Democratic primary. Jenkins attacked Hair as a "liberal" and criticized him for his support for the ERA. However, Hair won the primary by a wide margin, receiving 64 percent of the vote to Jenkins's 36 percent.

== Death ==
Jenkins died on November 18, 2007.
