= 2013 in American television =

In American television in 2013, notable events included television show debuts, finales, and cancellations; channel launches, closures, and rebrandings; stations changing or adding their network affiliations; and information about changes of ownership of channels or stations, controversies and carriage disputes.

== Events ==
=== January ===
| Date | Event |
|---|---|
| 2 | The Al Jazeera Media Network announces that they will acquire Current TV from an ownership group fronted by Al Gore and Joel Hyatt, with the intention to replace it with an American version of its Al Jazeera News network later in 2013. The announcement becomes the catalyst in Time Warner Cable's decision to drop Current TV from its systems, as TWC plans to drop several channels due to low viewership and to contract renegotiations within the year. |
| 2 | Cox Communications removes eight stations owned by Raycom Media in six markets due to a retransmission dispute. The markets affected were Cleveland (two stations), Baton Rouge, Tucson, Lake Charles, Louisiana, Richmond (two stations), and Panama City, Florida. |
| 5 | For the first time since 2002, music video channel VH1 changes its logo font (VH+1, with the H+ combined) and rebrands with a new slogan, "We Complete You", to focus on their conversion to a broader entertainment channel. VH1 Classic and VH1 Soul do not have logo changes. Also, Food Network changed their logotype to a slightly less-serifed typeface of lettering the following day. |
| 7 | Univision Communications rebrands its TeleFutura network as UniMás. |
| 8 | ESPN issues an apology involving Brent Musburger's comments he made about Alabama quarterback A. J. McCarron and his girlfriend, Katherine Webb, during the telecast of the 2013 BCS National Championship Game. A week later, Musberger said, live and on the air, that sideline reporter Holly Rowe was "smoking hot". |
| 8 | ABC moves Jimmy Kimmel Live! to the 11:35 pm (ET) slot, putting it in direct competition with NBC's The Tonight Show with Jay Leno and CBS's Late Show with David Letterman. Nightline moves to the 12:35 am (ET) timeslot and will expand to a primetime hour-long edition that will air on Friday nights in the 9 pm (ET) timeslot starting in March. |
| 10 | After only one season, Britney Spears announces that she will leave The X Factor (amid rumors and tensions between her and the show after the conclusion of the second season) to return to recording. |
| 11 | Sinclair Broadcast Group announces it will sell CW affiliate WLWC/Providence, Rhode Island to OTA Broadcasting, LLC for $13.75 million, pending FCC approval. |
| 14 | CBS affiliate WBKB-TV in Alpena, Michigan, the only commercial television station in its market, begins carrying ABC programming on its third digital subchannel, giving the Alpena market its first full-time ABC affiliate. |
| 15 | Communications Corporation of America announces its intent to sell all 25 of its stations in ten markets located in Texas, Louisiana, and Indiana. |
| 16 | Former Democratic United States Congressman and Presidential candidate Dennis Kucinich joins Fox News Channel as a political analyst and contributor. |
| 17 | OTA Broadcasting purchases My Family TV affiliate WYCN-LP/Nashua, New Hampshire from New Hampshire 1 Network, Inc. for $4.1 million. Under the deal, New Hampshire 1 Network (run by Bill Binnie, whose Carlisle One Media owns independent station WBIN-TV in nearby Derry) will continue to operate the station upon consummation of the sale. |
| 18 | NRJ TV acquires 2 stations owned by Titan Broadcast Management. It acquires Estrella TV affiliate KTNC/San Francisco for $13.5 million and independent station KUBE/Houston for $19 million. Titan will continue to operate both stations upon the sale's consummation. The acquisition of KTNC will create a legal duopoly in the San Francisco market with MundoFox affiliate KCNS (which was bought by NRJ, a company which Titan holds a minority equity stake, for $15 million in 2011). |
| 18 | Time Warner Cable announces that they will no longer accept ads for guns or any form of firearms on all its cable systems. The move comes after an ad from the National Rifle Association of America (which in turn was a response to a plan that is being implemented by the Obama Administration to issue a ban on assault weapons in the wake of the Sandy Hook Elementary School shooting) began airing on The Sportsman Channel, which TWC happens to offer on their systems |
| 20 | Former U.S. Secretary of State Condoleezza Rice joins CBS News as a contributor/commentator. |
| 24 | Fox affiliate WXXA/Albany officially discontinues its 5 and 11 pm newscasts, concentrating instead on its morning and 10 pm newscasts. The move is related to WXXA's shared services agreement with ABC affiliate WTEN, which has its own newscasts at 5 and 11 pm |
| 24 | After years of being "bumped" due to the show "running out of time", Matt Damon exacts revenge on Jimmy Kimmel by taking over as host of this date's airing of Jimmy Kimmel Live! |
| 25 | Sarah Palin parts ways with Fox News Channel after a three-year stint as a contributor. The separation is short-lived, as Palin rejoins Fox News on June 13. |
| 28 | Major League Baseball's Los Angeles Dodgers confirm the formation of a new regional sports network, SportsNet LA, in partnership with Time Warner Cable. The network, whose content will be controlled by the Dodgers, will air Dodgers broadcasts beginning in 2014 (a 25-year deal estimated at $7–8 billion and subject to MLB approval), supplanting incumbent rightsholders Prime Ticket and KCAL-TV. |
| 28 | Fox Television Stations announces its purchase of the Capitol Broadcasting-owned duopoly in the Charlotte market: WJZY (The CW) and WMYT-TV (MyNetworkTV). The $18 million deal, which is completed on April 17, leads to the end of WCCB's 27-year run as Charlotte's Fox affiliate, with the network's programming moving to WJZY on July 1 (WCCB takes over CW affiliation on that date). |
| 31 | Married political analysts James Carville and Mary Matalin parts ways with CNN, both citing the network's desire to move in a new direction and to focus on other projects. |
| 31 | After seven seasons and 138 episodes, 30 Rock aired its final two episodes, "Hogcock!" and "Last Lunch", which featured a cameo from Congresswoman Nancy Pelosi, and a nod to the final scene from St. Elsewhere in which NBC programming president (and revealed to be immortal) Kenneth Parcell (Jack McBrayer) is pitched a pilot for a sitcom, aptly named 30 Rock, by Liz Lemon's (Tina Fey) great-granddaughter 100 years in the future. |

=== February ===
| Date | Event |
|---|---|
| 3 | CBS airs Super Bowl XLVII, which includes a 34-minute power outage in the third quarter, a surprise reunion of Destiny's Child during the halftime show, and a Baltimore Ravens victory over the San Francisco 49ers by a score of 34–31. With an estimated 108.4 million viewers, it ranked third on the most-watched list, behind Super Bowls XLIV and XLVI. |
| 4 | Fox affiliate KLRT/Little Rock discontinued its weeknight 10 p.m. newscast, while in turn debuting a new weekday morning newscast and reducing the hour-long 5 pm newscast to a half-hour 5:30 pm show. This is related to KLRT and its CW-affiliated sibling KASN forming an outsourcing agreement with Nexstar Broadcasting Group (owners of NBC affiliate KARK and MyNetworkTV affiliate KARZ), forming a virtual quadropoly, in which all four will be based in KARK's studios. |
| 4 | CBS' Hawaii Five-0 aired an updated remake of the original series' sixth-season episode "Hookman", using the same scripts and locations from the 1973 broadcast. The episode was directed by Peter Weller, who also played the amputee sniper (that was originally played by real-life amputee actor Jay J. Armes) who has a hatred for Honolulu Police Department officers by targeting the individuals, including Commander Steve McGarrett (Alex O'Loughlin), whose father, in this version of the remake, was responsible for his loss of his hands. |
| 5 | Fox News Channel announces that it has dropped political analyst Dick Morris from the network and will not renew his contract. Morris believed that the decision by Fox to drop him can be traced to his "prediction" that Mitt Romney was going to beat Barack Obama in a landslide during the 2012 Election, only to be proven wrong on election night. |
| 6 | Nexstar Broadcasting Group announces its acquisition of NBC affiliate KSEE/Fresno, California from Granite Broadcasting for $26.5 million. The station will be operated in tandem with CBS affiliate KGPE, which it acquired in 2012 from Newport Television, through a time brokerage agreement until the sale is approved. |
| 6 | Nexstar also settles a lawsuit against Granite Broadcasting that alleged that the latter company controlled advertising sales through its carriage of five network affiliations on two Fort Wayne, Indiana stations (WISE-TV and co-managed WPTA), resulting in that market's Fox affiliation returning to WFFT-TV from WISE's second subchannel on March 1, reversing a 2011 switch that resulted from a dispute between Nexstar and Fox over retransmission compensation. |
| 6 | After announcing in 2012 that they would exercise their option to buy six stations from Sinclair Broadcast Group, Fox Television Stations decides to pass on acquiring any of the stations. However at the same time, Sinclair announces that they are looking to add more stations to the 87 they own or operate in 47 television markets. |
| 6 | Catamount Broadcasting agrees to sell CBS affiliate KHSL/Chico, California to GOCOM Media, LLC for $7 million. The deal includes its local marketing agreement with NBC affiliate KNVN (owned by Evans Broadcasting). |
| 7 | Wheel of Fortune taped one week of shows with the second $1,000,000 and a recent $100,000 (the usual grand prize) win on concurrent episodes, the first time Wheel had done so in giving out consecutive grand prize wins since the $100,000 prize was introduced in 2001 (see May 30 below). |
| 7 | Jeopardy! produced its second "triple zero" finish (all three contestants finished with a score of $0) in the second semi-final of 2013 Teen Tournament, resulting in the elimination of three contestants and one wildcard contestant was brought into effect (the contestant was later revealed to be Leonard Cooper, who gone on to win the tournament overall). This was only the second time in the show's history that a triple zero occurred during a tournament, with the first being the quarter-finals of the 1991 Seniors Tournament. |
| 8 | Charter Communications acquires cable provider Optimum West from Cablevision Systems Corporation for $1.6 billion. The sale closed during the third quarter of 2013 with Optimum West customers directed to Charter's site thereafter. |
| 11 | The Emergency Alert System infrastructure of CBS affiliate KRTV/Great Falls, Montana is broken into with a false audible warning of a zombie apocalypse over both the main signal and their CW digital subchannel, along with a request to tune into 920 AM – a station that does not exist in Great Falls – for more information (an audio recording of this incident that was broadcast February 12 on WIZM-FM/La Crosse, Wisconsin simultaneously set off the EAS receiver of CBS affiliate WKBT). The station quickly denied the EAS warning was true, suggesting a hacker invasion into the EAS system. A similar EAS intrusion incident took place hours later in Marquette, Michigan, when PBS member station WNMU and ABC affiliate WBUP had the same message carried over both stations' signals. |
| 12 | Comcast announces it will purchase the remaining 49% stake of NBCUniversal from General Electric for $16.3 billion, ending 27 years of GE's ownership of NBC in some capacity. |
| 13 | LIN Media rescinds its 24% ownership stake in (de facto) NBC owned-and-operated stations KXAS-TV/Fort Worth-Dallas and KNSD/San Diego, paying NBCUniversal a $100 million withdrawal from the joint venture involving the two stations. |
| 13 | Former Massachusetts Senator Scott Brown, who turned down an offer to run for the seat that was vacated by John Kerry in the special election, joins Fox News Channel as a contributor/analyst. A day later, Herman Cain also joins the network for the same duties as well. |
| 13 | Upstart company Rural Broadband Investments (created through a partnership with private equity firm GTCR) acquires cable provider New Wave Communications, which serves rural areas of Illinois, Indiana, Missouri and Arkansas, from Pamlico Capital. Financial terms of the agreement were not disclosed. |
| 14 | CBS Corporation acquires a minority ownership interest in event-oriented cable channel AXS TV (joining stakes owned by Mark Cuban, Anschutz Entertainment Group, Ryan Seacrest Media and the Creative Artists Agency in the joint venture). The specific percentage of CBS' stake in the network was not disclosed. |
| 16 | All seven stations owned by Grant Broadcasting System II disappear from Dish Network due to a dispute over retransmission consent|retransmission fees (markets affected by the blackout are Huntsville, Alabama, Davenport, Iowa (two stations), Roanoke, Virginia (two stations) and La Crosse, Wisconsin). |
| 18 | Reflecting the new direction of CNN under the leadership of new network president Jeff Zucker, the 'flipper' ticker on the bottom of the screen, which displayed headlines from CNN.com's RSS feeds, is replaced with a traditional scrolling news ticker, returning the scroll to CNN for the first time since 2008. |
| 19 | 16-year-old Prince Michael Jackson I joins Entertainment Tonight as their new correspondent, making him the youngest reporter ever in the 32-year history of the program. However, due to his status as a minor, his role will be on a limited basis. |
| 19 | Another former political veteran switches jobs to television, as Barack Obama's former campaign advisor and former journalist David Axelrod joins NBC News and MSNBC as their political analyst/commentator. |
| 24 | The 85th Academy Awards telecast makes history when First Lady of the United States Michelle Obama announces the winner for Best Picture (Argo) live from the White House. |
| 25 | Cox Media Group sells its four small market television stations in El Paso, Texas, Johnstown, Pennsylvania, Reno, Nevada and Steubenville, Ohio to Sinclair Broadcast Group for $99 million. Cox is selling these stations in order to focus on its larger market stations. Concurrently, Deerfield Media will acquire the license assets of Reno's KAME-TV, which has long been operated by Cox, from Ellis Communications. Sinclair also announced the formation of a subsidiary, Chesapeake Television, which will focus on smaller markets such as those served by the four former Cox stations. |
| 25 | Hubbard Broadcasting acquires MyNetworkTV affiliate WNYA/Pittsfield, Massachusetts from Venture Technologies Group, which will create a duopoly with nearby Albany, New York NBC affiliate WNYT for $2.3 million, pending FCC approval. The station is seeking a 'failed station waiver' to acquire the station. |
| 25 | Diane Dostinich acquires the 51% ownership stake in Daystar affiliate KKJB/Boise that was held by station co-owner Gary Cocola of Cocola Broadcasting for $1.2 million. |
| 26 | Cablevision files an antitrust lawsuit against Viacom in a Manhattan federal court, alleging that the media conglomerate illegally forced the cable provider to carry 14 lower-rated channels (such as VH1 Classic, Palladia and MTV Hits) in order to carry higher-profile cable networks owned by Viacom such as MTV, Nickelodeon and Comedy Central. |
| 28 | Sinclair Broadcast Group reaches a retransmission consent agreement with DirecTV. The removal of 87 Sinclair owned or operated stations in 47 markets would have occurred on March 1, if a new retransmission consent agreement was not reached before the prior carriage deal expired. |
| 28 | Sinclair also adds more stations to its portfolio, as it acquires the 18 Barrington Broadcasting stations (and the LMA/SSAs of six that Barrington operates) in a $370 million deal. However, Sinclair will spin off WSYT/Syracuse (including transferring the LMA of WNYS to another company) and WYZZ/Bloomington-Peoria due to overlapping in the two markets, along with turning over four others to Cunningham Broadcasting. |
| 28 | Negotiations break down between "Judge" Joe Brown and CBS Television Distribution over plans to cut his salary for his self-titled syndicated court show, which could see Brown splitting from CTD and taking his show elsewhere if the dispute is not resolved, as Brown has yet to sign a new deal. CTD announced that if Brown leaves, it would offer stations another courtroom show to make up for Brown's series contract into 2015 as a backup. On March 26, CTD announced that Judge Joe Brown was canceled and scrubbed plans for another courtroom show after stations balked on having a replacement. Brown is still looking for a new deal to have his show sign with another distributor. |
| 28 | The creators behind the ABC sitcom Home Improvement, Matt Williams, Carmen Finestra, Tam O'Shanter and David McFadzean (under the banner Wind Dancer Productions), file a lawsuit against The Walt Disney Company, seeking millions of dollars in revenue for failing to properly exploit the series after it went into syndication in 1995, including claims that they never received 75% of the show's profits after the series ended its run (in 1999). |

=== March ===
| Date | Event |
|---|---|
| 1 | Fox Sports South and SportSouth announce they have picked up 45 more Atlanta Braves games, ending the team's contract with WPCH-TV. The 2013 season is the first in 40 years without locally produced Braves games on over-the-air TV. |
| 4 | CNBC takes over production of the Nightly Business Report (the NBCUniversal-owned cable channel purchased the rights to the program from investment firm Atalaya Capital Management on February 21); however, American Public Television will continue to distribute NBR solely for public television stations throughout the country. Production of the program will move to CNBC's studios in Englewood Cliffs, New Jersey. |
| 4 | ABC affiliate WKPT-TV/Kingsport, Tennessee debuts local newscasts at 6 and 11 pm, the first full-fledged newscasts broadcast on the station since it terminated a news share agreement with CBS affiliate WJHL-TV in 2008 (and the first to be produced in-house since WKPT's previous news department shut down in 2002). The half-hour newscasts – which air only on weeknights – originate from WKPT's studios in downtown Kingsport. |
| 5 | Major League Soccer announces a deal with MyNetworkTV owned-and-operated station WPWR-TV/Chicago (owned by Fox Television Stations) to broadcast 20 Chicago Fire games during the 2013 season (WPWR previously served as the team's over-the-air television broadcaster during the 2011 season). |
| 13 | Kroenke Sports Enterprises acquires the Outdoor Channel for $227 million. |
| 14 | MSNBC names Chris Hayes (host of the weekend morning program Up with Chris Hayes) as its new 8 pm ET host effective April 1. Hayes will succeed Ed Schultz, whose program The Ed Show immediately went on hiatus after its March 14 broadcast, and will return later in April as part of the channel's weekend afternoon schedule (and expanding to two hours). |
| 19 | New York Supreme Court judge Robert Muller files an injunction barring Lifetime from airing or promoting Romeo Killer: The Christopher Porco Story (premiering on March 23), following a lawsuit filed by Porco – who was convicted of his father's murder and the attempted killing of his mother in 2004 – on grounds that events depicted in the made-for-cable film were fictionalized (despite not having seen the movie). On March 21, a New York appellate court lifted the injunction following an appeal filed by Lifetime, alleging the risk of financial damage due to its $3 million investment in the film and violations of constitutional speech protections. |
| 19 | Tribune Company forms Tribune Studios (not to be confused with the formerly owned Los Angeles studio facility that once held the same name), which will primarily produce programs for the company's 23 television stations and WGN America. This is Tribune's second production company, having operated Tribune Entertainment from 1984 to 2007. |
| 19 | Liberty Media acquires a 27% ownership interest in cable provider Charter Communications for $2.62 billion. The purchase is Liberty founder John Malone's first major investment in a cable operator since the 1999 sale of Tele-Communications, Inc. to AT&T Corporation. |
| 20 | Fox Sports enters into a broadcast rights agreement with the realigned Big East Conference, effective with the 2013–14 academic year. The contract (which will run through 2025) includes rights to televise all men's and select women's regular season and tournament basketball games, and all Olympic sports from the conference. Sporting events from the new Big East will be broadcast primarily on the forthcoming national sports network Fox Sports 1. The deal follows a broadcast contract signed on March 19 between ESPN and the American Athletic Conference (the original Big East) through the 2019–20 academic year. |
| 20 | Comcast SportsNet Chicago suspends Chicago Bulls analyst (and former Bulls shooting guard) Kendall Gill following a March 19 physical altercation in the regional sports network's newsroom with Big Ten Network analyst Tim Doyle, over comments Doyle made about Gill's analysis of the March 18 Bulls-Denver Nuggets game on the panel discussion show Sports Talk Live. |
| 21 | NBCUniversal, through its NBC Owned Television Stations subsidiary, acquires Telemundo affiliate WWSI/Atlantic City, New Jersey (part of the Philadelphia media market) from ZGS Communications for $20 million. The deal will create a duopoly with NBC owned-and-operated station WCAU. |
| 21 | A transmitter problem takes CBS affiliate KPHO/Phoenix off the air on the network's first day of NCAA Division I Basketball Tournament coverage. The disruption also affected subscribers of Dish Network, and cable providers Western Broadband Cable and Orbitel Communications (Cox Communications and DirecTV customers in the area were not affected). |
| 24 | NBC affiliate KTEN/Sherman, Texas is knocked off the air due to a lightning strike that caused significant damage to some broadcasting equipment at the station's main studio in Denison. |
| 26 | CBS Corporation acquires a 49% interest stake in TV Guide Network from One Equity Partners, with Lions Gate Entertainment retaining its 51% stake in the cable channel. A collaborative rebranding effort of the network, seen in 80 million homes, later occurs: The network adopts the TVGN name on April 15, and a complete end of on-screen listings is expected. |
| 26 | A war of words erupts between Fox News Channel and actor Jim Carrey: FNC reporter Greg Gutfeld makes a critical statement on this date over "Cold Dead Hands", Carrey's anti-gun video for the viral website Funny or Die, with Gutfield taking issue with Carrey's views on gun control by stating that, "He [Carrey] is probably the most pathetic tool on the face of the earth and I hope his career is dead and I hope he ends up sleeping in a car." Carrey responds on March 29 by calling the network "A media colostomy bag that has begun to burst at the seams." |

=== April ===
| Date | Event |
|---|---|
| 1 | In a lawsuit filed by the four major broadcast networks, a New York judge rules that Aereo, a pay service which streams broadcast station signals online and through mobile devices without paying fees to the networks or their stations, does not breach federal copyright rules as it utilizes antennas leased to its subscribers to stream station signals. The ruling sparks a threat during an NAB conference presentation on April 9 from News Corporation COO Chase Carey to turn Fox into a subscription-only service, if pending court proceedings do not rule against Aereo (similar statements were later made by executives of Univision and CBS). |
| 1 | Shield Media's ABC affiliate WLAJ/Lansing, Michigan begins simulcasting Young Broadcasting CBS affiliate WLNS/Lansing's 6 and 11 pm newscasts. |
| 1 | Lockwood Broadcast Group announces it will acquire CW affiliate WCWG/Greensboro, North Carolina from Titan TV Broadcast Group for $2.75 million. |
| 2 | ACME Communications sells its last operating asset, the syndicated morning show The Daily Buzz, to Mojo Brands Media. |
| 3 | Confirming a month of speculation, NBC announces that Jay Leno will retire from hosting The Tonight Show in Spring 2014 (his second retirement from the show), and that Jimmy Fallon will be promoted from Late Night to succeed him. As part of the move, Tonight will return to NBC's New York studios, Late Night's home base and Tonight's original home until 1972. NBC later announces that Seth Meyers will succeed Fallon on Late Night. Meyers will be the third consecutive Saturday Night Live alumni to host the show. |
| 3 | After 13 years as their chief business correspondent, Ali Velshi announces his departure from CNN. On April 4, Velshi signs with upcoming news channel Al Jazeera America to host a new daily business program. |
| 3 | TV Guide celebrates its 60th anniversary issue with six covers featuring stars of popular shows from each decade: Lucille Ball (the 1950s), Star Trek's William Shatner and Leonard Nimoy (the 1960s), Mary Tyler Moore (the 1970s), Bill Cosby (The 1980s), Homer Simpson (the 1990s) and Matthew Fox (the 2000s-present), all draped in digitized mosaic TV Guide covers from their eras. |
| 8 | For the first time since becoming a Fox affiliate, WUTV/Buffalo starts airing a nightly 10 pm newscast, as it takes over WGRZ's primetime broadcast from sister station WNYO and expands it to seven nights a week. In addition, WGRZ is expected to begin running a rebroadcast of its morning program Daybreak on WNYO, which will move to WUTV in the future. |
| 11 | Sinclair Broadcast Group acquires the radio and television assets of Fisher Communications for $373.3 million. The acquisition includes 20 television stations in eight markets (including KOMO-TV/Seattle and KATU/Portland, Oregon) and three radio stations in the Seattle market. On April 22, an unnamed Fisher shareholder filed a lawsuit to stop the Sinclair acquisition, alleging that Fisher Communications management breached their fiduciary duties by agreeing to sell the company to Sinclair at a $41/share offer that undervalued the company via an "unfair process". |
| 15 | At approximately 2:50 pm (EDT), two explosions around Copley Square, just before the photo bridge that marks the finish line, were caught live on camera during the telecast of the Boston Marathon, about three hours after the winners crossed the line. The event causes local stations in the Boston media market and the major networks, including ESPN, to cancel regular programming to carry continuing coverage of the tragedy. At least three deaths were reported and 280 people were injured. Four days later, just hours after the suspects' pictures are aired on national TV, all Boston news outlets preempt programming for nonstop coverage of the massive manhunt for the suspects, brothers Dzhokhar and Tamerlan Tsarnaev, after a police chase and standoff that left an MIT campus police officer and one of the two suspects dead from gunshots and the other suspect escaping into a Watertown neighborhood, eluding capture for most of the day until finally being arrested. The major four broadcast networks pre-empt the majority of their schedule nationally from 2 am ET on into prime-time on the 19th to also cover the story. |
| 16 | The Seattle Mariners acquire a controlling interest in Root Sports Northwest, which broadcasts the team's games, from DirecTV Sports Networks. DirecTV retains a minority stake in the network and will continue to manage it, and the Root Sports branding and Fox Sports Networks programming will remain. Additionally, the team extended its contract with the network until the end of the 2030 season. |
| 19 | Sportscaster Al Michaels is arrested in Santa Monica, California and is charged with a misdemeanor DUI. He is released after a five-hour stay in jail. |
| 24 | Nexstar Broadcasting Group and Mission Broadcasting announce the purchase of the 25 Communications Corporation of America stations in ten markets located in Texas, Louisiana, and Indiana. The deal will give Nexstar/Mission additional duopolies in Shreveport-Texarkana, Odessa-Midland, Texas and Evansville, Indiana. |
| 24 | Ani Khojasarian becomes the first $100,000 winner of the pricing game Pay The Rent on The Price Is Right. |
| 29 | WCVB-TV/Boston substitutes "Still", a new episode of the ABC series Castle with a previously aired episode from season two, "The Late Shaft", featuring local native Tom Bergeron, out of sensitivity to the aftermath of the Boston Marathon bombing, and with permission from ABC. "Still" had already been delayed from its original April 22 airdate nationally due to the plot revolving around Kate Beckett (Stana Katic) being stuck in place to avoid the detonation of an explosive device. Viewers in the northern portion of the market were still able to watch the new episode over WCVB's sister station WMUR-TV/Manchester, New Hampshire. It was also made available on demand and to Hulu viewers in the Boston area the next morning. |
| 29 | WBIN/Derry, New Hampshire drops its Independent News Network-produced weeknight 10 pm newscast, replacing the newscast with syndicated programming. The station plans on resuming local news programming sometime in 2014; Al Kaprielian's locally based weather updates will continue unaffected. |
| 29 | WVTT/Olean, New York ends all of its local newscasts and its local marketing agreement with Colonial Media and Entertainment. The move comes ahead of the station's sale to Milachi Media, which is filed with the FCC in June. |
| 29 | After two years of being off the air, ABC's two canceled soap operas, All My Children and One Life to Live, returned on website The Online Network. |

=== May ===
| Date | Event |
|---|---|
| 1 | Allbritton Communications Company, which owns seven ABC-affiliated television stations including WJLA-TV/Washington, D.C., and Washington, D.C.-based regional cable news channel NewsChannel 8, announced that it is exploring "strategic alternatives", including the possible sale of the station group. |
| 2 | Comcast SportsNet Chicago reporter Susannah Collins is let go by the network following an on-air gaffe during Chicago Blackhawks playoff coverage in which she said the team enjoyed a "tremendous amount of sex" (rather than success) during the season. CSN Chicago also claimed it was because she hosted a web series called "Sports Nutz" with profane content in the past that had not been discovered before she was hired. |
| 3 | Broadcast five days before her death, Jeanne Cooper makes her final appearance as Katherine Chancellor on The Young and the Restless. |
| 6 | It is announced that reality show Cops will leave Fox after 25 seasons and move to Spike TV. |
| 13 | Weigel Broadcasting discontinues its partnership in the digital multicast network it co-founded with Metro-Goldwyn-Mayer, This TV, to focus on its two other diginets, MeTV and Movies!; fellow Chicago-based company Tribune Broadcasting will take over Weigel's share of programming and operational responsibilities for This TV, with MGM remaining as the network's joint owner. |
| 13 | Viewers of How I Met Your Mother see the future mother of Ted Mosby's children for the first time in the show's 8th-season finale. She is played by Cristin Milioti, and is credited only as the "girl with the yellow umbrella"; when Milioti becomes a cast regular for the series' 9th and final season in September, she is credited only as "The Mother." |
| 14 | ABC introduces a live streaming app called Watch ABC during the network's 2013–14 schedule upfronts, making available linear streaming of local ABC stations and on-demand full episodes of ABC programming to authenticated subscribers who can access the service online or via the Watch ABC app on iOS, Kindle Fire and Samsung Galaxy devices. The app will roll out first to the ABC Owned Television Stations, followed by the 13 ABC affiliates owned by Hearst Television in the Summer before making it available to other affiliates in the Fall. |
| 16 | Candice Glover is crowned 12th season champion of American Idol, making her the first female winner to win American Idol since Jordin Sparks six seasons prior. The season finale marks the start of a major overhaul in the long-running (but ratings-bleeding) singing competition, as judges Randy Jackson, Mariah Carey, and Nicki Minaj, as well as executive producers Nigel Lythgoe and Ken Warwick, announced their departure. |
| 20 | An analysis announced by the Leichtman Research Group reveals the first net loss of cable, satellite, and telco TV subscribers over a 12-month period (ending March 31, 2013); the analysis is billed as the first tangible proof of "cord-cutting" by pay TV customers. |
| 20 | Deborah Turness, a former editor of Britain's ITV News, is named as the new president of NBC News. |
| 20 | On the same day that a major tornado strikes Moore, Oklahoma, CBS postpones (until May 30) this evening's 3rd-season finale of Mike & Molly, which involved a tornado descending on the show's setting of Chicago. |
| 21 | Kelly Rowland and Paulina Rubio are announced as judges for season 3 of The X Factor, joining returnees Simon Cowell and Demi Lovato on the show's judges panel. |
| 24 | At about 3.5 million claps as of the episode of Wheel of Fortune, Vanna White set a record for clapping the largest times during the show's 30th anniversary. |
| 26 | Ten spectators are injured (three of whom require hospitalization) when nylon rope supporting a Fox Sports skycam snaps and falls into the grandstand during the Coca-Cola 600 NASCAR race. The incident also causes damage to several cars in the race, forcing a 27-minute delay. |
| 27 | Weigel Broadcasting and Fox Television Stations launch a digital subchannel network called Movies!, primarily airing on Fox's owned-and-operated stations. |
| 28 | The Young and the Restless pays an entire episode to the actress Jeanne Cooper, who died on May 8 at the age of 84. Jeanne's character Katherine Chancellor death was mentioned on the soap in August. |
| 28 | Adam Levine, a coach in the current season of The Voice, made an unpatriotic comment in response of the weekly results (two of three contestants from his team were eliminated that night), prompting calls for him to be removed to a "Communist country" or pursued by secretive anti-terrorism hit squads. Levine, in his response, tweeted dictionary definitions of words "joke", "humourless", "lighthearted" and "misunderstood", but later apologized and explained that he felt "confusing and downright emotional" and cited that his response was based on his personal dissatisfaction of the results. |
| 29 | A three-judge panel on the U.S. Court of Appeals for the District of Columbia unanimously rules that Comcast did not violate FCC program carriage rules when placing the Tennis Channel on a sports tier, and that the FCC and Tennis Channel did not provide evidence that Comcast had discriminated against the channel in favor of its own sports channels (as the FCC had ruled in July 2012). Tennis Channel files an appeal on July 12. |
| 30 | Autumn Erhard solved "Tough Workout" in the bonus round with only the G's showing and become the second $1,000,000 winner in the long-running game show Wheel of Fortune. At $1,030,340 cash and prizes won, her winnings had surpass Michelle Lowenstein's total of $1,026,080 to become the largest single-day winner in the show history, she held onto the record until September 2025. |
| 30 | The aforementioned episode was rescheduled from the initial broadcast of May 31, 2013 by the producers due to theming reasons (in honoring the show's 30th anniversary of syndication). The episode that taped after (which aired on June 11) also had another contestant winning $100,000 (the usual grand prize), making the first time both grand prizes were won on concurrent episodes in Wheel of Fortune based on taping order. |

=== June ===
| Date | Event |
|---|---|
| 1 | Nexstar Broadcasting Group rebrands the Memphis ABC affiliate it acquired from Newport Television in 2012, changing the station's call sign (from WPTY-TV to WATN-TV) and branding (from "ABC 24" to "Local 24"). The change coincides with the station's move (with sister CW affiliate WLMT and Jackson market Fox affiliate WJKT) from Midtown Memphis to new studios at the Shelby Oaks Corporate Park in the city's northeast side, as well as high definition upgrades for its newscasts. |
| 1 | Gray Television launches WRGX-LD as the new NBC affiliate in the Dothan, Alabama market. WRGX replaces Panama City sister station WJHG-TV and Montgomery-based WSFA on Dothan-area cable systems. |
| 1 | GMC TV rebrands as Up, a reflection of its shift from gospel music-related programming to a general entertainment schedule of family-oriented original and acquired programs. |
| 1 | Cinemax rebrands two of its multiplex channels: the female-oriented WMax is relaunched as MovieMax, a channel dedicated to family-friendly films, and the young adult-oriented @Max became Max Latino, a Spanish language simulcast of the flagship Cinemax channel. |
| 1 | The country music video service The Country Network rebrands as ZUUS Country following the digital multicast network's acquisition by Zuus Media. |
| 1 | Philippine actress/singer Charice Pempengco, who portrays Sunshine Corazon on Glee, reveals to her fans that she is a Tomboy (a Filipino term for Lesbian) during an interview on her home country's ABS-CBN program The Buzz, saying she decided to finally come out after turning 21 in May. She then issued an apology and a thank you to her fans on YouTube for their support. |
| 2 | NBC airs highlights of the Women's Concert for Change at Twickenham Stadium in London, England. It is presented by The Today Show's Savannah Guthrie and contains performances at the event from the likes of Beyoncé, Jennifer Lopez and Iggy Azalea. |
| 2 | Blackhawk Broadcasting purchases NBC affiliate KYMA-DT/Yuma, Arizona from Intermountain West Communications for $1.3 million. On July 23, Blackhawk will also acquire competing station KSWT from Pappas Telecasting, and will apply for a 'failing station' waiver to acquire it. |
| 2 | SagamoreHill Broadcasting sells its NBC affiliate KGNS/Laredo, Texas and CBS affiliates KGWN/Cheyenne, Wyoming & KSTF/Scottsbluff, Nebraska to Yellowstone Holdings, LLC for $20.5 million. |
| 3 | Sinclair Broadcast Group continues its acquisitive streak by acquiring six stations from Titan Broadcast Management for $115.35 million. Sinclair will own four stations (KMPH-KFRE/Fresno, KPTM/Omaha, KPTH/Sioux City), and it will provide operating services to two stations (KXVO/Omaha and KMEG/Sioux City). |
| 6 | Media General announces a merger deal with the privately held Young Broadcasting in an all-stock deal. The deal closes on November 12, with the combined company (owning 30 stations in 27 markets) keeping Media General's name and Richmond headquarters (Young was based in Nashville). |
| 10–14 | In honor of her 80th birthday (which fell on June 8), E! lets Joan Rivers "take over" the network for a week-long celebration that includes Rivers serving as host or presenter on E!'s in-house programs, along with a full week of new episodes of her Fashion Police program. |
| 12–13 | ESPN makes major moves in its programming and operations, beginning with an announcement on the 12th that it will close down its ESPN 3D channel at year's end (the actual closing occurs earlier, on September 3), citing a low level of home viewer adoption in 3D television technology. On the 13th, it announces the cancellation of ESPNews' Highlight Express and ESPNU's UNite, as well as several layoffs, most notably that of network researcher and Stump the Schwab star Howie Schwab. |
| 17 | Intermountain West Communications sells Idaho stations KPVI-TV/Pocatello and KXTF/Twin Falls to a subsidiary of Yellowstone Holdings, LLC, for $1 million. |
| 19 | In a first for TV Land, Hot in Cleveland airs a live episode. A later episode in this season will feature a reunion of cast members from The Mary Tyler Moore Show, with Mary Tyler Moore, Valerie Harper, Georgia Engel, and Cloris Leachman joining HIC series regular Betty White as members of Elka's bowling team, who reunite after a fallout from their championship winning season decades ago. |
| 21 | Food Network announces it will not renew the contract of Paula Deen when it expires at the end of the month. The move comes as the popular cooking personality faces controversy over her admitted past use of racial epithets in the presence of her employees. |
| 21 | A jury in a US District Court in Little Rock, Arkansas rules that the 2008 ownership transfer of Retro Television Network from Equity Media Holdings to its then-CEO Henry Luken was "constructively fraudulent", and award a trustee for creditors of the bankrupt and defunct Equity $47.4 million. The verdict prompts Luken Communications (Retro TV's current owner) to file for Chapter 11 bankruptcy reorganization two days later. |
| 27 | KSL-TV/Salt Lake City, Utah announces it will begin airing Saturday Night Live in its regular 10:35 pm slot when the NBC program begins its 39th season in September. (KUCW had previously aired SNL in the Salt Lake market.) It is a somewhat surprising move for KSL, a station owned by the LDS Church-controlled Bonneville International that has had a long history of not airing network programming due to local commitments (the station had aired Sportsbeat Saturday in place of SNL) or content deemed inappropriate (the reason given for dropping shows such as The New Normal and Hannibal, which KUCW has also cleared). |
| 28 | News Corporation officially splits into two companies: Its newspaper and publishing properties are spun off into a separate company that retains the News Corp name, while the remaining broadcast and film properties (including Fox, its TV stations, cable assets, MyNetworkTV, and the 20th Century Fox TV studio and syndication properties) assemble under a new corporate banner, 21st Century Fox. |
| 28 | The Walt Disney Company releases a new Mickey Mouse cartoon short for the first time since 1953, through the debut of a series of animated shorts broadcast on the Disney Channel. |
| 30 | Hour of Power, after 33 years, airs its last episode from its longtime home, the Crystal Cathedral in Garden Grove, California. |

=== July ===
| Date | Event |
|---|---|
| 1 | Tribune Broadcasting acquires the 19 stations of Local TV, LLC for $2.73 billion. The purchase of Local TV, which had been put up for sale by Oak Hill Capital Partners on March 22, is approved by the FCC on December 20 and increases Tribune's station portfolio from 23 to 42 (and expands the number of Big Three affiliates it owns from one to 10), including duopolies in St. Louis and Denver (where the companies had been involved in LMA's). One station in Scranton and two in Norfolk/Portsmouth are transferred in a sidecar agreement to Dreamcatcher Broadcasting, due to Tribune having newspaper operations in those markets. On July 10, Tribune Company announced a spin-off of its newspaper division to a newly formed company, Tribune Publishing Company. |
| 1 | One America News Network begins programming. A joint venture between WealthTV owner Herring Broadcasting and The Washington Times newspaper, the 24-hour network is a news/talk competitor to Fox News Channel, featuring "mainstream" conservative viewpoints with some independent and libertarian opinions included. |
| 1 | Audio cable music service Music Choice and OneBeat launch OneBeat TV, a new channel dedicated to Electronic Dance Music and its culture, lifestyle, and genre. The service, which brings its first EDM-formatted channel to the United States, will be offered free to cable subscribers on Music Choice's VOD service until August 11. |
| 1 | One day after ending a 15-year run as host of CNN's Reliable Sources, Howard Kurtz joins Fox News Channel. Kurtz's move, announced by FNC on June 20, sees the long-time media reporter and critic serve as an on-air analyst, columnist for the network's website, and host his own media criticism show, MediaBuzz. |
| 1 | WBCC/Cocoa, Florida changes its call letters to WEFS. The change reflects the name change of its owner, Brevard Community College, to Eastern Florida State College, a move made to advertise the offering of new four-year degrees. WEFS' programming remains unchanged. |
| 2 | WWOR-TV/Secaucus, New Jersey airs its final 10 pm newscast and closes its news department; it had produced newscasts since 1971, even after it became a sister station to WNYW/New York City (under Fox Television Stations) in 2001. In its place, the station will launch Chasing New Jersey, a nightly New Jersey-focused public affairs program, on July 8. Chasing New Jersey, which is produced by Fairfax Productions from a studio in Trenton and hosted by Bill Spadea, will also be seen on sister station WTXF-TV/Philadelphia as a lead-in to its morning newscast; Fairfax Productions is led by Dennis Bianchi, WTXF's vice president and general manager. Despite the closure of its news department, WWOR's Secaucus facilities, which are separate from the New York City studios of WNYW, will remain open. |
| 4 | For the first time since 1987, the "Boston Pops Fireworks Spectacular" and accompanying Fourth of July concert by the Boston Pops Orchestra are not nationally televised. CBS, which carried the final hour of the festivities since 2003 (A&E had carried the full event prior to that) announced on June 15 that it would no longer air the event, citing decreased ratings and increased competition from NBC's broadcast of the Macy's 4th of July Fireworks in New York City. CBS-owned WBZ-TV continues to air the full event in the Boston market. |
| 12 | During its noon newscast, KTVU/Oakland-San Francisco unknowingly misidentifies the pilots of Asiana Airlines Flight 214 by false names that are considered derogatory and racist. In its own defense, officials at the Cox Media Fox affiliate say the National Transportation Safety Board confirmed the names to them. The NTSB later admits that an intern who "acted outside the scope of his authority" supplied the false names to the station. The intern is fired from the NTSB on July 15, while the incident leads Asiana Airlines to file a defamation lawsuit against KTVU, a suit that is withdrawn after the station formally apologizes live on the air. |
| 18 | Three Netflix original productions — Arrested Development, Hemlock Grove, and House of Cards — receive a combined 14 nominations for the 65th Primetime Emmy Awards, the first Emmy nominations given to long-form programs made specifically for a web television service. |
| 22 | News-Press & Gazette Company announced that the license assets of Idaho Falls' CBS affiliate KIDK and Fox affiliate KXPI-LD, will be sold to VistaWest Media, LLC, a company based in St. Joseph, Missouri (where NPG is also based); the stations will remain operated by NPG under a shared services agreement. |
| 23 | NASCAR announces a 10-year contract with NBC Sports Group that will see the second halves of the Sprint Cup Series and Nationwide Series air on NBC and NBC Sports Network beginning in 2015. The deal sees NASCAR reuniting with NBC, which aired Sprint Cup races from 2001 to 2006, as well as an end in 2014 to NASCAR's partnership with Turner Sports and ESPN (the circuit's relationship with Fox Sports is expected to continue). |
| 29 | Sinclair Broadcast Group adds another station group to its portfolio, as it acquires the Allbritton Communications Company for $985 Million. The stations include Allbritton's flagship station, WJLA-TV/Washington, D.C., and Washington, D.C.-based regional cable news channel NewsChannel 8. As part of the deal, Sinclair will spinoff CBS affiliate WHP-TV/Harrisburg, MyNetworkTV affiliate WMMP/Charleston, South Carolina and the Birmingham duopoly of The CW affiliate WTTO & MNT affiliate WABM because those stations are located in the same markets where it competes against the Allbritton stations. The following day (July 30), Sinclair announced plans to use NewsChannel 8 as a "launching point" for a national news channel, airing both within the Sinclair group and on MVPD systems for a "unique hybrid model." |

=== August ===
| Date | Event |
|---|---|
| 1 | Stations owned and operated by Raycom Media (53 stations in 36 markets) and shared services partner American Spirit Media vanish from Dish Network after both sides fail to reach a new retransmission agreement. The stations are restored by Dish by August 10. |
| 1 | Pivot launches, replacing the Documentary Channel and Halogen TV. The Participant Media-owned channel is aimed at young adults between 18 and 34 years old, and is also the first TV channel to offer broadband-only subscriptions, allowing live streaming of the linear channel and video on demand offerings without requiring a pay TV service subscription. |
| 1 | NBC Nightly News anchor Brian Williams announces he is taking a leave of absence to recover from knee replacement surgery; Nightly's weekend anchor, Lester Holt, fills in for Williams in the interim. |
| 1 | WLAE-TV/New Orleans leaves PBS to increase its focus on its local programming; the station had contemplated the move since a cut in funding from the state of Louisiana in 2010. WLAE had carried 25 percent of PBS' programming as a secondary member station; WYES-TV remains New Orleans' main PBS member station. |
| 2 | News-Press & Gazette Company announced the sale of the license assets of KJCT/Grand Junction, Colorado to Excalibur Broadcasting, LLC, and its non-license assets to Gray Television. Gray will operate the station through joint sales and shared services agreements, making KJCT a sister station to KKCO. |
| 4 | In an internationally televised live special, Peter Capaldi is formally introduced as the Twelfth Doctor for the upcoming season of Doctor Who. |
| 7 | The United States Golf Association announces a 12-year multimedia deal with Fox Sports, which will see USGA championship events (most notably the U.S. Open) air on Fox and Fox Sports 1 beginning in 2015. The deal will mean an end to the USGA's relationships with NBC Sports and ESPN in 2014. |
| 9 | After 16 years, Joy Behar co-hosts The View for the final time. Her departure leaves Barbara Walters as the talk program's last original co-host, a role Walters herself will relinquish (along with her duties at ABC News) in Summer 2014 (Walters made her intentions public in May 2013). |
| 12 | Horseshoe Curve Communications agreed to sell Fox affiliate WWCP-TV/Johnstown, Pennsylvania to Cunningham Broadcasting for $12 million. Sinclair Broadcast Group, owner NBC affiliate, WJAC-TV, will operate the station through shared services and joint sales agreements. Included in the deal is the existing LMA for WWCP-TV to operate ABC affiliate WATM-TV, which will continue to be owned by Palm Television. |
| 14 | The fourth-season premiere of Duck Dynasty makes history for A&E, pulling in 11.8 million viewers, the largest audience ever for an original series produced for cable television (scripted and non-scripted) and the highest-rated series in A&E's 29-year history. |
| 16 | The Republican National Committee announces that they will ban CNN and the news divisions of NBC Universal (including MSNBC and Telemundo) from taking part in Republican Presidential debates for the 2016 campaign. The RNC's decision is a reaction to the two networks' planned projects on Hillary Clinton (a documentary on CNN, a dramatic miniseries on NBC), with RNC chairman Reince Priebus claiming the projects give the Democrat Clinton's potential 2016 Presidential campaign a boost over those of GOP candidates. On September 30, NBC and CNN announced that they have canceled their projects, citing pressure from both political parties and those close to Clinton's inner circle, who did not feel comfortable to give interviews or stories that could hurt her political future. |
| 17 | Fox Sports rebrands and revamps two of their specialty sports channels into broader sports networks: the motorsport-oriented Speed becomes Fox Sports 1, while extreme sports-oriented Fuel TV becomes Fox Sports 2. |
| 17 | With an NBC Sports Network broadcast of a Stoke City-Liverpool match, NBC Sports begins its coverage of English Premier League soccer. It also marks a gradual rebranding of NBC Sports Network, with the channel set to be simply known as the abbreviated "NBCSN" by early 2014. |
| 19 | NBC affiliate KSNV/Las Vegas begins expanding its daily newscast with the addition of a 3 pm broadcast, followed by a 7 pm newscast in September, becoming the first network affiliated station in the Pacific Time Zone (and the second NBC affiliate after WTMJ/Milwaukee) to phase out first-run programming for continuous news programming. KSNV also plans to drop all syndicated programming in 2016 when its contract with CBS Television Distribution expires. As a result of these changes, the station has arranged The CW affiliate KVCW to pick up Days of Our Lives, where it will continue in the same 1 pm timeslot that KSNV has given up to make room for the 3 pm newscast. |
| 20 | Al Jazeera America launches, replacing Current TV. The network is a U.S.-based and -operated news channel expected to compete with CNN, MSNBC and Fox News Channel. It is the second Al Jazeera Media Network channel to launch in the U.S. after beIN Sport, a sports network owned 50/50 between Al Jazeera and Turner Broadcasting System. As a result, Al Jazeera English discontinued their online feed in the United States. |
| 25 | At the 2013 MTV Video Music Awards, Miley Cyrus creates a controversy by "Twerking" during a duet with Robin Thicke, a performance that some described as "raunchy" and "provocative". It also included a striptease by Lady Gaga, which critics had similar comments about. Ironically, it featured the first performance of *NSYNC in 11 years. |
| 26 | Four months after moving to weekends, The Ed Show moves back to MSNBC's weekday schedule, taking the 5 pm (ET) time slot previously occupied by one of two airings of Hardball with Chris Matthews (Hardball goes live at 7 pm). |
| 26 | The sports talk show Olbermann debuts on ESPN2. It marks the return of Keith Olbermann to the ESPN family, as well as his return to sports-oriented programming after several years as a political commentator for MSNBC and Current TV. |
| 30 | David Letterman marks his 20th anniversary with CBS with a Late Show episode that features his first guest in 1993, Bill Murray. |

=== September ===
| Date | Event |
|---|---|
| 1 | The MDA Show of Strength benefit concert moves to ABC, airing as a two-hour special on the network. The move ends the special's 47-year run as a syndicated Labor Day weekend event (the stations that aired it were collectively known as the "Love Network"). |
| 2 | FXX, an entertainment sister network to FX, commences programming in the channel space previously occupied by Fox Soccer, whose remaining programming shifts over to Fox Sports 1 and Fox Sports 2. |
| 2 | After over 10 years airing on rival WGN-TV, Live! with Kelly and Michael begins airing on WLS-TV in Chicago, becoming the last ABC-owned station to air the ABC-syndicated program. Live! airs in WLS-TV's 9 am timeslot, which was previously occupied by local program Windy City Live (which replaced the station's 11 am newscast as a result of Live's move) and the Chicago-based Oprah Winfrey Show prior to that. |
| 2 | The CBS Corporation/Time Warner Cable retransmission consent dispute, which began a month earlier, is resolved, with all channels and website video rights restored as of 6 pm ET and on-demand content shortly after. Terms are not disclosed, though both sides describe them as satisfactory to each of them, including the addition of Showtime Anytime streaming rights for Time Warner. |
| 2 | Cedric the Entertainer begins his stint as the third host of Who Wants to Be a Millionaire, succeeding Meredith Vieira, who left the show in May after 11 seasons and will eventually move to her own talk shown in 2014; she succeeded original host Regis Philbin who has since retired from broadcasting. |
| 3 | Fox confirms a new judging panel for American Idol's 13th season, with newcomer Harry Connick Jr. joining Jennifer Lopez (who returns to Idol after a one-year absence) and Season 12 holdover Keith Urban. They join Ryan Seacrest, who returns as host, and former judge Randy Jackson, who returns as on-air mentor. |
| 7 | PBS NewsHour expands to weekends for the first time with PBS NewsHour Weekend. Anchored by Hari Sreenivasan, the half-hour Saturday and Sunday newscasts originate from WNET/New York City, as opposed to the weekday NewsHour's base at WETA-TV's Arlington, Virginia studios. |
| 8 | Carrie Underwood debuts as singer of "Waiting All Day for Sunday Night", the theme song for NBC Sunday Night Football. Underwood is the third singer to handle the theme's vocals, after Pink (2006) and Faith Hill (2007–2012). |
| 9 | NBC affiliate KSL-TV/Salt Lake City moves Days of Our Lives from 1 pm to 1:05 am (Mountain Time). While the station has not explicitly stated its reason, it has been speculated that a storyline involving a gay couple (the characters of Will Horton and Sonny Kiriakis) prompted the move. The move makes the second time in nearly three weeks that an NBC affiliate has opted to delay or pre-empt the 47-year-old serial, following KSNV/Las Vegas' decision to let competitor KVCW air the program due to their decision to expand its news programming. |
| 9 | Jenny McCarthy joins The View as new co-host. |
| 9 | Gwen Ifill and Judy Woodruff become permanent co-anchors of the weekday PBS NewsHour, ending the show's practice of rotating co-anchor pairings since Jim Lehrer stepped down from his on-air role on the show in June 2011. |
| 13 | PBS member station KQED 9/San Francisco ends This Week in Northern California after 23 years on air. Host and anchor Thuy Vu announced that on October 18, KQED will launch KQED Newsroom, which replaces This Week in Northern California. |
| 16 | Two months after ending a 10-year run on The View, Elisabeth Hasselbeck joins Fox News Channel's Fox & Friends; she succeeds Gretchen Carlson, who left the show the previous Friday and gets her own afternoon show on the network, The Real Story, on September 30. |
| 16 | NBC's Today unveils a redesigned set and orange-hued logo, as well as a new "Orange Room" segment, hosted by Carson Daly and featuring social media updates and online extended interviews. |
| 16 | Nexstar Broadcasting Group acquires the three stations of Citadel Communications in and mainly broadcasting to the state of Iowa for $88 million, which includes WOI/Des Moines, WHBF/Rock Island, and KCAU/Sioux City (WOI and KCAU are ABC affiliates; WHBF is affiliated with CBS). In a separate deal, Mission Broadcasting has acquired Binghamton stations WICZ-WBPN-LP from Stainless Broadcasting Company for $15.25 million, making them sister stations to Nexstar-owned WIVT and WBGH-CA. |
| 17 | In Wheel of Fortune, contestant Paul Atkinson's incorrect pronunciation of "Corner Curio Cabinet" sparked controversy and even fueled speculations that Atkinson became the program's first-ever contestant to lose the $1,000,000 grand prize on the Bonus round. On the same episode, the episode's winner Luis Hernandez became the first contestant to successfully attempt the Express wedge which was introduced in replacement of the Jackpot wedge an episode earlier. |
| 18 | In NBC, Japanese mime Kenichi Ebina won the eighth season of America's Got Talent, making him the first mime and foreign act to win. |
| 19 | Andrew Kravis wins the $2,600,000 jackpot on The Million Second Quiz, which propels him to third place on the game show winnings records list, behind Ken Jennings and Brad Rutter. His total winnings on the game show surpasses the previous primetime game show winnings record of $2,180,000, which was previously held by Kevin Olmstead back on April 10, 2001. |
| 20 | Milwaukee-based Journal Broadcast Group has their stations restored to Time Warner Cable systems in the Milwaukee (WTMJ-TV), Green Bay/Fox Cities (WGBA-TV/WACY-TV), Omaha (KMTV-TV) and Palm Springs (KMIR-TV/KPSE-LP) markets (WTVF in Nashville, which is on limited Time Warner systems in Tennessee and Kentucky, was unaffected under their agreement made with former owner Landmark Communications, but was also part of the new retransmission consent agreement) after being off the systems since July 25, while the digital subchannels for each station (Live Well in Milwaukee and Omaha, MeTV in Green Bay, and AccuWeather in Milwaukee) and KPSE-LP were pulled from Time Warner systems on July 11. However unlike most carriage agreements where all channels were restored to their previous positions, the standard definition positions were sold off by Time Warner Cable to GSN in each market during the dispute, forcing those stations onto other free channels (as high as 83 for WACY and 99 for KMTV) and all carriage of Journal's subchannels was discontinued, though all high definition channel slots were retained. |
| 22 | The 65th Primetime Emmy Awards are presented from Los Angeles, with Breaking Bad taking home its first win for Best Drama series and Modern Family repeating as Best Comedy series for the fourth consecutive year, while Derek Hough won in the Outstanding Choreography category, which was presented in the main show rather than the Creative Arts ceremony for the first time. The event also saw Netflix made history with three wins including David Fincher's Primetime Emmy Award for Outstanding Directing for a Drama Series for directing the House of Cards pilot episode "Chapter 1" as well as a pair of Creative Arts Emmy Awards, making "Chapter 1" the first Primetime Emmy-awarded webisode, and NBC's The Voice won the Outstanding Reality-Competition Program. Neil Patrick Harris hosts the show (and doubled as co-producer), which airs on CBS. In a rare move, the network pre-empts its signature newsmagazine 60 Minutes due to airing the Emmys after an NFL doubleheader. |
| 23 | After two delays and a channel relocation, the "metrosexual" male-oriented Esquire Network commences programming, replacing the 15-year-old fashion-and-design channel Style Network. Esquire Channel's launch was delayed from April 22 and "Summer 2013", and was originally slated to replace G4. The channel's launch on this date coincides with the 80th anniversary of the first issue of the Hearst Corporation's men's magazine of the same name. |
| 24 | News-Press & Gazette Company acquires three California stations owned by Cowles Publishing Company. The stations include KION-KMUV-LP/Monterey and KKFX/San Luis Obispo. Cowles will keep ownership of KCOY/Santa Maria, which NPG will operate under a shared services agreement with KEYT/Santa Barbara (which NPG bought from Smith Media in September 2012). |
| 25 | Sinclair Broadcast Group announces the acquisition of eight stations owned or operated by New Age Media. To comply with FCC ownership regulations, three stations—WSWB in Scranton/Wilkes-Barre, Pennsylvania, WTLH in Tallahassee, Florida, and WNBW-DT in Gainesville, Florida—will then be sold to Cunningham Broadcasting; a fourth station, WTLF in Tallahassee, will be purchased by Deerfield Media. These four stations will be operated by Sinclair through joint sales and shared services agreements; WSWB, WNBW, and WTLF are owned by MPS Media but have long been operated by New Age Media through such agreements (which Sinclair will continue), while WTLH cannot be acquired by Sinclair directly due to its existing ownership of WTWC-TV. |
| 25 | In ABC's Who Wants to Be a Millionaire, Josina Reaves became the second contestant to unsuccessfully attempt the $1,000,000 question (a question regarding Nostradamus's section of making jams and jellies; she incorrectly answered grave digging), its first time on doing so since Ken Basin failed to correctly answer the final question on August 23, 2009. Unlike Basin, Reaves risked only $75,000 (out of $100,000) due to her using the "Jump" lifelines on both $250,000 and $500,000 questions prior to the $1,000,000 question. |
| 26 | Stating that its "technical justification... no longer appears valid", the FCC formally submits a proposal to eliminate the discount, adopted in 1985 during the analog TV era, that counts a UHF station's reach to be one-half of its market when applied to a broadcaster's national ownership limit. The proposal would grandfather portfolios of any broadcaster with existing or pending ownership of UHF stations that would put them over the 39% national cap without the discount at the time of the proposal's submission. |
| 27 | The Price Is Right devotes all six "pricing game" segments to one of its best-known and most-popular games, Plinko in honor of the game's 30th anniversary. |
| 27 | Nearly a year after the launch of Comcast SportsNet Houston, NBCUniversal announces that affiliates of it and parent company Comcast have filed an involuntary Chapter 11 bankruptcy petition for the network to "resolve structural issues affecting CSN Houston's partnership." The partnership is composed of the Houston Astros (who own 46% of the network), the Houston Rockets (who own 30%), and NBCUniversal (who owns the remaining 23%). The move did not sit well with the Astros, which stated that the filing was made "improperly" to prevent the Astros from ending its agreement with CSN Houston; the team also revealed that it did not receive the rights fees from Houston Regional Sports Network (the network's legal name) for the final three months of the 2013 season. |
| 28 | Litton Entertainment takes over CBS' Saturday morning lineup with a teen-oriented block of programming bearing the umbrella title CBS Dream Team. As a result, CBS' Cookie Jar TV (a block that had been under the control of three different companies since its 2006 premiere) is discontinued, and Litton gains control of two Saturday morning network program blocks (it already operates Litton's Weekend Adventure for ABC). |
| 28 | Second-year Saturday Night Live cast member Cecily Strong becomes co-anchor of the show's Weekend Update segment alongside Seth Meyers. Also, for the first time in its 39-year history, the program extended to two hours with musical guests Arcade Fire doing a 30-minute set called Arcade Fire in Here Comes the Night Time, that featured cameo appearances by Ben Stiller, Bono, Bill Hader, Zach Galifianakis, Rainn Wilson, Aziz Ansari, and Michael Cera. Although viewers saw the act leave the SNL stage after the commercial break wearing the same outfits and continued performing in the same get up for the extended program, the concert footage appears to have been filmed at the band's surprise September 9 appearance at Montreal's Club Salsathèque. |
| 28 | Saturday Night Live airs for the first time on KSL-TV, knocking off SportsBeat Saturday to another slot, nearly after many years of airing on Salt Lake's CW affiliate KUCW. |
| 29 | Hour of Power airs its first show from Shepherd's Grove, the campus of the former St. Callistus' Church, located one mile south of the Crystal Cathedral, where the show was taped for 33 years. |
| 30 | Cowles Publishing Company acquires the Montana cluster of Max Media for $18 million. Stations includes NBC affiliate KULR/Billings, and its ABC affiliates KWYB/Butte, KFBB-TV/Great Falls, KHBB-LD/Helena and KTMF/Missoula. |

=== October ===
| Date | Event |
|---|---|
| 1 | The United States federal government shutdown of 2013 affects some communications operations for the government, with the Federal Communications Commission suspending reviews of mergers between station groups, which usually take 180 days to complete, due to the FCC being drawn down to only a spare 2% skeleton crew of workers, a halt to work on all applications, and a nearly blank website. Federally funded NASA TV and its website were also shut down, besides still screens notifying viewers of the situation. The shutdown ends on October 16, with the FCC resuming website operations nearly immediately, and NASA TV the next day. |
| 1 | Cable One, a nineteen-state cable provider owned by The Washington Post Company, pulls most of the networks of Turner Broadcasting System from their systems in a carriage dispute, including Cartoon Network, TruTV, CNN and HLN, along with TBS and TNT despite being under a different agreement, affecting Major League Baseball playoffs coverage in CableOne markets. This occurs on the same day The Washington Post Company's namesake newspaper has their purchase by Amazon founder Jeff Bezos closed upon, breaking the Post off from TWPC, along with TWPC's Post-Newsweek Stations division. The two parties come to terms on a new agreement on October 25. |
| 1 | A carriage dispute between Dish Network and the networks and stations of the Walt Disney Company, whose contract expired on the 1st, is averted due to a short-term extension. However, Media General's eighteen stations are removed from Dish Network due to Media General's refusal to negotiate new retransmission consent terms before their acquisition of Young Broadcasting was approved; the company subsequently allowed four of the stations (WJTV in Jackson, Mississippi, WHLT in Hattiesburg, Mississippi, WKRG-TV in Mobile, Alabama, and WVTM-TV in Birmingham, Alabama) to be restored for the weekend of October 5–6 to allow Dish Network to carry their coverage of Tropical Storm Karen. |
| 4 | Journal Broadcast Group reaches a deal to sell its two stations in Palm Springs, California, NBC affiliate KMIR-TV and MyNetworkTV affiliate KPSE-LP, to OTA Broadcasting. |
| 5 | Miley Cyrus receives positive reviews from critics as she served as both guest and musical host on Saturday Night Live, where among the highlights include her opening sketch poking fun at her 2013 MTV Video Music Awards performance, an acoustic performance of "We Can't Stop" and a controversial parody video of the aforementioned song, retitled "We Did Stop" (about the United States federal government shutdown of 2013) with Cyrus playing outgoing United States Congresswoman Michele Bachmann (R-Minnesota 6th) and Taran Killam impersonating Cyrus as Speaker of the House John Boehner (R-Ohio 8th). |
| 7 | During Game 3 of the American League Division Series, on-field microphones of MLB Network's crew accidentally broadcast a heated exchange of profanity between Oakland Athletics pitcher Grant Balfour and Detroit Tigers designated hitter Víctor Martínez which results in a bench-and-bullpen-clearing near-brawl. The channel's announcers apologize soon after, though no action could be taken as MLB Network is not under FCC obscenity regulations, nor was the game aired on broadcast television. |
| 7 | PBS KIDS rebrands; PBS KIDS GO! ended its run after 9 years. |
| 8 | MacNeil/Lehrer Productions announces in a letter to the staffers of the PBS NewsHour that it had offered to sell its stake in the program to WETA-TV (the program's originating station, and already a coproducer). In the letter, Jim Lehrer and Robert MacNeil cited their reduced involvement with the program's production since their departures from anchoring, as well as "the probability of increasing our fundraising abilities." |
| 9 | The country music-oriented digital broadcast network The Nashville Network (owned by Luken Communications and Jim Owens Entertainment) rebrands as Heartland. |
| 10 | NBCUniversal Cable's G4 loses more carriage, as the moribund network is dropped from Cablevision systems on that date. Time Warner Cable already dropped the channel on September 23, with Verizon FiOS following on October 1. DirecTV has not carried it since 2010. |
| 10 | Independent station KTUD-CD/Las Vegas unexpectedly announces it will end operations and go dark at midnight due to insufficient advertising revenues; the station's parent company has struggled for several years and the station filed for bankruptcy in 2010. |
| 10 | The Fox series Glee pays tribute to late cast member Cory Monteith, who died July 13, with "The Quarterback", an episode dealing with the main characters' grief over the death of Monteith's character, former McKinley High quarterback and New Directions glee club member Finn Hudson. |
| 16 | Detective John Munch turns in his badge as Richard Belzer makes his last regular appearance on Law & Order: Special Victims Unit. Belzer had played the character for two decades, dating back to his originating the role on Homicide: Life on the Street in 1993. His departure leaves Captain Donald Cragen (Dann Florek) as the only character on the series that originated on another show in the Law & Order franchise; he played the character from 1990 to 1999 on the original Law & Order. |
| 16 | Due to a power failure at South Park Studios, the producers of South Park are unable to make the network deadline for airing the new episode "Goth Kids 3: Dawn of the Posers", a first in the series' 17-year run that an episode was not completed in time. A rerun of the classic episode "Scott Tenorman Must Die" is aired by Comedy Central in its place, with "Goth Kids 3" airing on October 23. |
| 21 | Smith Media reaches a deal to sell its last remaining station, NBC affiliate WKTV/Utica, NY to Heartland Media, a company owned by Bob Prather, who had been President/COO of Gray Television until resigning from the company on June 21. |
| 21 | The Sean "Diddy" Combs-backed music network Revolt launches with distribution on Time Warner Cable and Comcast systems. Combs launches the network using the childhood home of the late The Notorious B.I.G. as a backdrop to begin the network's schedule. |
| 24 | Al Jazeera America and Time Warner Cable come to terms for national carriage of the network, which will be added to New York and Los Angeles systems by the end of the year, and nationally by March 2014. The announcement coincided with the weekend of El Clásico, which aired in the United States on Al Jazeera's beIN Sport. |
| 26 | For the first time, Fox News Channel deviates from its news-and-analysis programming to carry a live sporting event, the final quarter of a Big 12 college football game between Texas Tech and Oklahoma. The move of the game (whose start was delayed by an hour) from Fox is due to the committed live schedule of the other Fox Sports cable networks and to ensure Fox's coverage of the World Series start on-time. The game remains on Fox affiliates in Oklahoma and Texas until its conclusion, at which time they pick up the World Series game in progress. |
| 26 | ABC-O&O station WLS-TV/Chicago restores the Eyewitness News brand to its newscasts, a brand the station used from 1969 until 1996. |
| 26 | In the wake of the death of Marcia Wallace, producers of The Simpsons announce they will retire the character she voiced for the series, schoolteacher Edna Krabappel. |
| 28 | Fusion commences programming, offering entertainment, news and talk programming aimed at a millennial and Hispanic-American audience. The cable channel is a joint venture between ABC News and Univision Communications, who promote the launch with a simulcast of their respective morning shows, Good Morning America and ¡Despierta América!. |
| 28 | ABC late night host Jimmy Kimmel apologizes for a bit aired during his talk show in which he responds to a child who suggests killing the Chinese to solve the United States' debt to China. The sketch incites protests by the Chinese American community, and a petition on the White House website with enough signatures to warrant a formal response from the Obama administration. |
| 28–31 | Conan O'Brien airs a week of retrospectives on Conan marking his 20th anniversary as a late-night TV host. The show also put classic clips from Late Night with Conan O'Brien and The Tonight Show with Conan O'Brien on its website that were loaned from the NBC archives until November 15. |
| 29 | The US Senate confirms Tom Wheeler and Mike O'Reilly to open Commissioner seats on the Federal Communications Commission. Wheeler will become the FCC's chairman, taking the reins from Commissioner Mignon Clyburn, who had been acting chairwoman since May 20, when she became the first female FCC chair. |
| 30 | The Boston Red Sox defeat the St. Louis Cardinals to win Game 6 of the World Series. This was the team's first series clinch at Fenway Park since 1918. It is also the final game broadcast for Fox baseball analyst and former player Tim McCarver, who had been calling games for 33 years. The Red Sox's victory recovered the city of Boston six months after the marathon bombing that occurred on April 15. |
| 31 | After 58 years under the ownership of Duhamel Broadcasting Enterprises, the company announces the sale of KOTA-TV/Rapid City, South Dakota and its satellite stations in Scottsbluff, Nebraska (KDUH-TV), Lead, South Dakota (KHSD-TV), and Sheridan, Wyoming (KSGW-TV) to Schurz Communications. Duhamel will retain its radio properties (including KOTA radio); Schurz already owns a group of Black Hills radio stations under the New Rushmore Radio banner. Cookie Jar Toons/This is for Kids also ends broadcasting on This TV. |

=== November ===
| Date | Event |
|---|---|
| 1 | Tribune Broadcasting takes over programming and operations of Metro-Goldwyn-Mayer's This TV, from Weigel Broadcasting, with the network moving its flagship position in Chicago from Weigel's WCIU-TV to Tribune's WGN-TV. Replacing This TV's weekday/weekend Cookie Jar Toons/This is for Kids children's block is a Sunday-only three-hour block of unbranded E/I programming. |
| 2 | Facing criticism for a lack of African-American women in its performing cast, Saturday Night Live makes light of the controversy by having guest host Kerry Washington play both First Lady Michelle Obama and Oprah Winfrey in its cold open sketch at the same time (along with a "disclaimer" explaining the reason). SNL addressed the situation in January 2014 with the addition of women of color in its cast (Sasheer Zamata) and writing staff. |
| 4 | Gray Television announces that it will acquire KGNS/Laredo, KGWN/Cheyenne and its satellite KSTF/Scottsbluff, and KCWY/Casper and its satellite KCHY/Cheyenne from Yellowstone Holdings for $23 million. In the interim, Gray will operate the Yellowstone stations under a LMA, while pending FCC approval. |
| 6 | Gray Television reaches an agreement to launch the ABC affiliation on KGNS/Laredo's subchannel in February 2014. |
| 6 | Nexstar Broadcasting Group announces that it will purchase the seven stations of Grant Communications for $87.5 million. Due to Federal Communications Commission ownership regulations, one of the Grant stations, KLJB in Davenport, Iowa, will then be spun off to Mission Broadcasting, but will be operated by Nexstar through a shared services agreement. |
| 6 | Sinclair Broadcast Group acquires the non-license assets of WPFO, the Fox affiliate in Portland, Maine, from Corporate Media Consultants Group (which in turn is 49-percent owned by Max Media). Sinclair's existing Portland property, WGME-TV, has produced a newscast for the station since 2007. On November 20, it was announced that Cunningham Broadcasting will acquire the license assets for $3.4 million. |
| 7 | Dish Network announces that it will close its 300 remaining Blockbuster stores and DVD-by-mail service in January 2014, ending the video rental chain's 28 years in business. The Blockbuster name will still live on through Dish's suite of film channels, its online television and movie streaming services, and franchised brick-and-mortar operations. |
| 7 | Access.1 Communications sells NBC affiliate WMGM-TV/Wildwood, New Jersey to LocusPoint Networks for $6 million. Upon the completion of the sale, Access.1 continues to operate the station. |
| 9 | KTUU-TV, the NBC affiliate in Anchorage, Alaska, is dropped by GCI in 22 rural Alaska communities, after the two sides were unable to come to a new retransmission agreement, though GCI still carries some KTUU and NBC programming in some of these areas through the Alaska Rural Communications Service. The dispute does not involve areas (including Anchorage) where GCI carries KTUU through must-carry. The move follows the sale of rival KTVA to GCI subsidiary Denali Media Holdings a week earlier, which KTUU had opposed over concerns that this move could be made. KTUU's channel slot on most of the affected systems is now occupied by Starz Kids & Family. Despite this dispute, KTUU extended its newscast carriage agreement with fellow NBC affiliates KATH-LD in Juneau and KSCT-LP in Sitka (which were also acquired by GCI/Denali at the same time it acquired KTVA) through November 22. |
| 10 | CBS' 60 Minutes airs a formal apology for its October 27 story on the September 2012 attack on a US diplomatic mission in Benghazi, Libya. The story, reported by Lara Logan (who gives her own apology in a November 8 chat with CBS This Morning), featured an interview with a security contractor who claimed to have witnessed the attack, a claim whose validity had been scrutinized since the broadcast. On November 26, Logan and producer Max McClellan takes a leave of absence from the program as a result of an internal review issued by CBS News chairman Jeff Fager. |
| 11 | Over a month after reluctantly undergoing a mammogram in a live feature for Good Morning America (at the urging of GMA host and breast cancer survivor Robin Roberts), ABC News correspondent Amy Robach returns to GMA to reveal that she will undergo a double mastectomy as a result of that test's discovery of a breast cancer tumor. |
| 11 | SpongeBob SquarePants premieres the episode "SpongeBob, You're Fired!", which deals with the sensitive subjects of unemployment and public assistance through the titular character losing his job. The episode attracts 5.2 million viewers, becoming Nickelodeon's highest rated non-special program in two years. |
| 12 | As part of a graphics package refresh and a greater revamp aimed at "getting back to [its] roots", The Weather Channel unveils a news ticker-style weather information banner at the lower third of the screen. The ticker's constant appearance (during both regular programming and national commercial breaks) is a first for the channel. |
| 12 | Young Broadcasting and Media General completed their merger, four days after the FCC approved their merger. Due to the way the merger is structured, Young Broadcasting's shareholders will control a majority of Media General's stock; however, the combined company will take the "Media General" name (with headquarters remaining in Richmond) and will own 30 stations, reaching 14% of the United States. |
| 13 | NBCUniversal announces it has taken full ownership in the preschooler-oriented channel Sprout, buying out the shares of founding partners PBS, Sesame Workshop, and Apax Partners. |
| 14 | In a unanimous decision, the FCC votes to allow the examination, on a case-by-case basis, of requests by foreign entities to own broadcast properties beyond the 25% ownership limit imposed on them through the Communications Act of 1934. |
| 15 | FXX acquires cable syndication and on-demand rights to all episodes of The Simpsons at an estimated price of $750 million, considered to be the largest off-network deal in television history. The show is scheduled to begin airing on FXX in August 2014. |
| 15 | Lockwood Broadcast Group announced that a sale of WQCW to Excalibur Broadcasting for $5.5 million. Upon completion of the sale, Gray Television will operate the station through a shared services agreement, becoming a sister station to NBC affiliate WSAZ-TV. |
| 15 | MSNBC places Alec Baldwin and his program Up Late with Alec Baldwin on a two-week suspension after a confrontation with a reporter from Fox O&O WNYW/New York City, who was seeking to question him about a court case in which Baldwin was testifying at a trial of a woman accused of stalking him. Baldwin then insulted the reporter after he brushed him off, including criticizing his station's parent company, which was followed by more insults, including using anti-gay slurs, at other members of the press and paparazzi. Baldwin immediately apologized to his viewers for his actions. On November 26, Baldwin announced that he and MSNBC have agreed to end his program in part to his actions over the incident |
| 15 | The National Academy of Television Arts and Sciences, the organization that oversees the Emmy Award, announced plans to transition to an online voting system. The two-year, two-step switchover will first cover the initial round of Emmy voting that determines the nominees across all categories. The online voting will be extended to all rounds of Television Academy's Emmy voting process, determining nominees and winners in all categories, starting in 2015. |
| 20 | Gray Television announced the purchase of Hoak Media and Parker Broadcasting for $335 million, and North Dakota's Fox affiliates KNDX/KXND from Prime Cities Broadcasting for $7.5 million. In part of the deal Hoak's KHAS-TV, Parker's KXJB and KAQY, and the North Dakota Fox stations will be sold to Excalibur Broadcasting and operated by Gray under local marketing agreements. To comply with FCC ownership limits, on December 19, Gray announced that Hoak's KREX and WMBB and will be sold to Nexstar Broadcasting Group and Parker's KFQX to Mission Broadcasting, for $37.5 million. |
| 20 | Raycom Media announces it will operate New Orleans' Fox affiliate WVUE-DT, through a shared services agreement. WVUE's owner, the Tom Benson-owned Louisiana Media Company, will continue to hold the license of the station. |
| 22 | Numerous news programs and cable channels commemorate the 50th anniversary of the John F. Kennedy assassination by airing live memorials, retrospectives, analysis, and new documentaries. |
| 22 | Sinclair Broadcast Group acquires the non-license assets of Reno NBC affiliate, KRNV-DT, from Intermountain West Communications Company, for $26 million. It is expected to end the simulcast of KTVU newscasts airing on Fox station KRXI, and replace it with a KRNV-produced newscast. On December 19, it was announced that Cunningham Broadcasting will acquire the license assets of KRNV and KENV for $6.5 million. |
| 23 | The 50th anniversary of the debut of Doctor Who is commemorated with a global same-day simulcast of a special episode, "The Day of the Doctor". The premiere broadcast on BBC America attracts 2.4 million viewers, a record for the network. An interactive game featuring all 11 Doctors debuts on Google.com. |
| 23 | Bill Cosby: Far From Finished airs on Comedy Central, Cosby's first stand-up comedy special in 30 years. |
| 23 | During a live telecast for a Thanksgiving Special on the Food Network, Giada De Laurentiis accidentally cuts her finger while slicing up a turkey roll. During the break she went to receive medical attention; she then returned to the set to finish out the special with a bandaged finger. |
| 24 | With the series' producers reasoning it as a "fun way to shake things up" after 11 years, Family Guy's Brian Griffin dies after being hit by a car in the episode "Life of Brian", with the Griffins later adopting a new family dog, Vinny (voiced by Tony Sirico). This episode received immediate backlash after its airing, and so Brian is rescued from the dead (through Stewie Griffin's use of his time return pad) in the episode "Christmas Guy", which aired just a few weeks later on December 15. |
| 24 | Resolving a story line that predates the series, Thomas Jane (Simon Baker) encounters — and kills — Napa County Sheriff Thomas McAllister (played by Xander Berkeley), aka Red John, the serial killer responsible for the murders of Jane's wife and daughter, in The Mentalist episode "Red John". |
| 25 | Three days after her departure from ABC News is confirmed by the network, Katie Couric inks a deal with Yahoo! to serve as "global anchor" for Yahoo! News. |
| 26 | Amber Riley wins season 17 of Dancing with the Stars. |

=== December ===
| Date | Event |
|---|---|
| 2 | Encore rebrands two of its multiplex channels: Encore Drama becomes Encore Black, targeting African American viewers, while Encore Love becomes the baby boomer-targeted Encore Classic. Encore also moves Encore Español from the Starz package to Spanish language tiers. Additionally, all of the Encore channels remove the classic sunshine graphic that was used since its launch in 1991. |
| 4 | Popular Good Morning America weatherman Sam Champion appears on the program for the final time, as he leaves ABC after 25 years (18 with WABC-TV/New York City, and seven as weather anchor for ABC News) to become managing editor/program host at The Weather Channel in early 2014. |
| 4 | MSNBC host Martin Bashir submits his resignation in the wake of his graphic critique of Fox News commentator and former Alaska governor Sarah Palin in a November 15 commentary. |
| 5 | Stating that "it could no longer effectively serve the Northern Shenandoah Valley", Gray Television-owned TV3 Winchester discontinues its local news and sales operations. The ABC affiliate, seen only on cable in the Winchester, Virginia area but also available over-the-air on sister station WHSV-DT3 in nearby Harrisonburg, had offered local content since its launch in 2007. |
| 6 | Eleven months after dropping the channel's predecessor Current TV, Time Warner Cable begins adding Al Jazeera America to select TWC and Bright House Networks systems. Time Warner Cable and Bright House Networks are the first mainstream carriers in the country to offer the channel in high definition. |
| 8 | After five months of guest hosts in the wake of Howard Kurtz's departure from CNN, former reporter Brian Stelter of The New York Times officially debuts as the new host of Reliable Sources. |
| 9 | Denali Media Holdings (a subsidiary of GCI) purchases three Alaska CBS affiliates from Ketchikan Television for $1 million. The stations includes KUBD/Ketchikan, KTNL-TV/Sitka and KXLJ-LD/Juneau. |
| 10 | The 2013 Victoria's Secret Fashion Show is broadcast on CBS. 9.72 million people tune in. |
| 11 | The United States bankruptcy court gives its initial approval for a plan by the creditors of Roberts Broadcasting (including Ion Media Networks) to transfer its remaining television stations—WRBU/St. Louis (MyNetworkTV), WZRB/Columbia, SC (CW), and WAZE-LP/WJPS-LP/WIKY-LP/Evansville, IN (dark) to a trust, with Ion as its beneficiary. Roberts' attorney subsequently states that Ion would purchase the stations for $7.75 million, which will allow Roberts to emerge from Chapter 11 bankruptcy protection. Roberts had earlier proposed an alternate plan that would have had only the WAZE repeaters be transferred to the trust, with WRBU and WZRB being sold to Tri-State Christian Television. Roberts had filed to sell WZRB to TCT subsidiary Radiant Life Ministries on December 2 in a $2 million deal, and two days later filed to sell WRBU to TCT in a $5.5 million deal. |
| 12 | Six years after retiring as host, Bob Barker makes a return appearance on The Price Is Right to commemorate his 90th birthday. |
| 15 | El Rey, an English-language television channel by Robert Rodriguez and Univision Communications is launched. |
| 16 | WeatherNation TV is added to DirecTV giving the mainly broadcast digital subchannel network its first national television carrier and providing competition to The Weather Channel on DirecTV systems. |
| 16 | Time Warner Cable rebrands NY1, News 14 Carolina, and the YNN channels as "Time Warner Cable News" so that way subscribers know the channels are exclusive to their systems. However, Time Warner Cable wanted to keep the NY1 brand, so NY1 was rebranded as "Time Warner Cable News NY1". |
| 18 | Gray Television announces its purchase Rapid City Fox affiliate KEVN-TV (and Lead satellite station, KIVV-TV) from Mission TV, LLC (unrelated to Nexstar-connected Mission Broadcasting) for $7.75 million. |
| 18 | A&E places Duck Dynasty star Phil Robertson on an indefinite suspension for comments he made regarding homosexuality and the civil rights era in an interview with GQ. A&E reinstates Robertson on December 27. |
| 19 | KGWN-TV/Cheyenne, Wyoming discontinues its "Northern Colorado 5" service, stating that "it could no longer effectively serve the Northern Colorado area." The service, which launched in 2008, served (and was seen on cable in) the Fort Collins area (within the Denver market); it was also available over-the-air via KGWN-DT2 from Cheyenne. |
| 19 | On Fox, Alex & Sierra won the third and final season of The X Factor, giving Simon Cowell its second winning mentor. It was later revealed on February 7 the following year, that Cowell will cancel the series following his decision to return to the UK version of the series a day earlier, as well as low viewership. |
| 23 | Gannett Company completes its $2.2 billion purchase of the Dallas-based broadcasting/publishing company Belo Corporation. The deal, originally announced on June 13 and approved by the FCC on December 20, increases Gannett's TV station portfolio to 42 stations, including shared services agreements in Louisville and Portland in a sidecar agreement with Sander Media, a separate company owned by former Belo executive Jack Sander. (Gannett retains newspaper ownership in those markets.) The deal does not include Belo's KMOV/St. Louis and KTVK/KASW/Phoenix; the United States Department of Justice announced on December 16 that Gannett and Sander Media would have to divest KMOV to another company to preserve competition between KMOV and Gannett-owned KSDK (Gannett would have provided some services to a Sander Media-owned KMOV under the original deal). Gannett obliges on this date by agreeing to sell KMOV, KTVK, and KASW to Meredith Corporation for $407.5 million; the KASW license will then be transferred to SagamoreHill Broadcasting, as Meredith already owns KPHO-TV in Phoenix. |
| 27 | Tribune Broadcasting officially closes on their purchase of most of Local TV's stations, with three stations in markets with Tribune newspaper ownership conflicts purchased by Dreamcatcher Broadcasting and receiving services from Tribune. |
| 29 | In and end-of-year posting on her Facebook page, Good Morning America host Robin Roberts acknowledges having been in a ten-year relationship with another woman, becoming the latest TV personality to disclose their sexuality. |
| 30 | Former Today hosts Bryant Gumbel and Jane Pauley return to the NBC morning show, serving as guest co-hosts alongside Matt Lauer. |
| 30 | The Price is Right contestant Sheree Heil won an Audi R8 V8 Spyder Quattro S Tronic valued at $157,300 and $10,000 in cash in the pricing game Gas Money; combined with her One Bid win of $3,045 of Prada shoes, her total winnings for the episode is $170,345, making Heil the biggest daytime game show winner in history until on October 28, 2016, where Christen Freeman surpasses Heil's total with $213,876, including the $210,000 cash won in Cliffhangers. |
| 31 | Soapnet formally discontinues programming on all cable and satellite providers after 14 years. The closure of the Walt Disney-owned soap opera-oriented cable channel comes over three years after Disney announced plans to replace it with Disney Junior, which launched on its own in 2012. |
| 31 | Time Warner Cable CEO Glenn Britt retires after 41 years with the company. He is succeeded by the company's president and COO, Robert Marcus, on January 1, 2014. |

== Television programs ==
=== Entering syndication in 2013 ===
A list of programs (current or canceled) that have accumulated enough episodes (between 65 and 100) or seasons (3 or more) to be eligible for off-network syndication and/or basic cable runs.

| Show | Seasons | In Production | Source |
|---|---|---|---|
| Avengers Assemble | June 22, 2013 - April 16, 2023 | Yes | |
| Bridezillas | June 10, 2013 - November 27, 2016 | No | |
| The Cleveland Show | September 16, 2013 - September 15, 2017 | No | |
| Community | September 16, 2013 - September 8, 2017 | Yes | |
| Glee | September 9, 2013 - March 19, 2016 | Yes | |
| Hulk and the Agents of S.M.A.S.H. | September 14, 2013 - May 27, 2018 | Yes | |
| Henry Hugglemonster | June 17, 2013 - March 31, 2019 | Yes | |
| Liv and Maddie | September 30, 2013 - September 10, 2022 | Yes | |
| Mighty Med | November 4, 2013 - July 29, 2018 | Yes | |
| The Middle | September 16, 2013 - August 25, 2017 | Yes | |
| Modern Family | September 16, 2013-present | Yes | |
| Sanctuary | September 8, 2013 - January 20, 2019 | No | |
| Sofia the First | January 28, 2013 - May 17, 2016 | No | |
| Wander Over Yonder | September 30, 2013 - July 10, 2020 | No | |

=== Network changes ===
The following shows will air new episodes on a different network than previous first-run episodes.

| Show | Moved from | Moved to | Source |
|---|---|---|---|
| Mudcats | History | National Geographic Channel | |
| Tyler Perry's For Better or Worse | TBS | OWN | |
| Timothy Goes To School | Discovery Family | Qubo | |
| UFC Tonight | Fox Sports 2 | Fox Sports 1 | |
| The Ultimate Fighter | FX | Fox Sports 1 | |
| It's Always Sunny in Philadelphia | FX | FXX | |
| The League | FX | FXX | |
| Totally Biased with W. Kamau Bell | FX | FXX | |
| MDA Show of Strength | First-run syndication | ABC | |
| Wild 'n Out | MTV | MTV2 | |
| The Penguins of Madagascar | Nickelodeon | Nicktoons | |
| Big Brother: After Dark | SHO2 | TVGN | |
| Arrested Development | Fox | Netflix | |
| Cops | Fox | Spike | |
| Cougar Town | ABC | TBS | |
| All My Children | ABC | The Online Network | |
| One Life to Live | ABC | The Online Network | |
| NBA Inside Stuff | ABC | NBA TV | |
| Whose Line Is It Anyway? | ABC Family | The CW | |
| Who Do You Think You Are? | NBC | TLC | |
| Celebrity Ghost Stories | Bio | LMN | |
| The Haunting of... | Bio | LMN | |
| I Killed My BFF | Bio | LMN | |
| Killer Kids | Bio | LMN | |

=== Programs returning in 2013 ===
The following shows will return with new episodes after being canceled or ended their run previously:

| Show | Last aired | Previous channel | New title | New/returning/same channel | Returning | Source |
|---|---|---|---|---|---|---|
| The Joe Schmo Show | 2004 | Spike TV | Same | Same | January 8 | |
| Teen Titans | 2006 | Cartoon Network | Teen Titans Go! | Same | April 23 | |
| All My Children | 2011 | ABC | Same | The Online Network | April 29 | |
| Arrested Development | 2006 | Fox | Same | Netflix | May 26 | |
| The Venture Bros | 2010 | Adult Swim | Same | Same | June 2 | |
| Drop Dead Diva | 2012 | Lifetime | Same | Same | June 23 | |
| One Life to Live | 2012 | ABC | Same | The Online Network | July 15 | |
| Whose Line Is It Anyway? | 2007 | ABC Family | Same | The CW | July 16 | |
| Who Do You Think You Are? | 2012 | NBC | Same | TLC | July 23 | |
| The Arsenio Hall Show | 1994 | Syndicated | Same | Same | September 9 | |
| Crossfire | 2005 | CNN | Same | Same | September 9 | |
| The Heart, She Holler | 2011 | Adult Swim | Same | Same | September 10 | |
| Little People, Big World | 2010 | TLC | Same | Same | October 29 | |
| NBA Inside Stuff | 2005 | ABC | Same | NBA TV | November 2 | |
| Cyberchase | 2010 | PBS Kids | Same | Same | November 4 | |
| The Sing-Off | 2011 | NBC | Same | Same | December 9 | |

=== Milestone episodes ===
| Show | Network | Episode# | Episode Title | Episode air date | Source |
|---|---|---|---|---|---|
| Days of Our Lives | NBC | 12,000th | N/A | January 11 | |
| Fringe | Fox | 100th | "An Enemy of Fate" | January 18 | |
| Family Guy | Fox | 200th | "Valentine's Day in Quahog" | February 10 | |
| Castle | ABC | 100th | "The Lives of Others" | April 1 | |
| Regular Show | Cartoon Network | 100th | "Limousine Lunchtime" | April 8 | |
| American Dad! | Fox | 150th | "The Full Cognitive Redaction of Avery Bullock by the Coward Stan Smith" | April 28 | |
| The Office | NBC | 200th | "Finale" (part 1) | May 16 | |
| Keeping Up with the Kardashians | E! | 100th | "Life's a Beach (House)" | August 11 | |
| The Soup | E! | 500th | N/A; 2 live broadcasts for Eastern & Pacific feeds | August 21 | |
| Big Brother | CBS | 500th | N/A | September 5 | |
| It's Always Sunny in Philadelphia | FXX | 100th | "The Gang Saves The Day" | October 9 | |
| Modern Family | ABC | 100th | "Farm Strong" | October 9 | |
| Grey's Anatomy | ABC | 200th | "Puttin' on the Ritz" | October 10 | |
| The Middle | ABC | 100th | "The 100th" | October 23 | |
| CSI: Crime Scene Investigation | CBS | 300th | "Frame by Frame" | October 23 | |
| Total Drama Island | Cartoon Network | 100th | "Zeke and Ye Shall Find" | November 5 | |
| Arthur | PBS Kids | 200th | "All Thumbs/Kidonia" | November 15 | |
| The Good Wife | CBS | 100th | "The Decision Tree" | December 1 | |
| The Chew | ABC | 500th | "The Chew's 500th Episode" | December 3 | |

=== Programs ending in 2013 ===
| Date | Show | Channel | Debut | Status | Source |
|---|---|---|---|---|---|
| January 3 | Generator Rex | Cartoon Network | 2010 | Cancelled | |
| January 7 | Motorcity | Disney XD | 2012 | Cancelled | |
| January 7 | The Mob Doctor | Fox | 2012 | Cancelled | |
| January 10 | Mobbed | Fox | 2011 | Cancelled | |
| January 15 | Don't Trust the B— in Apartment 23 | ABC | 2011 | Cancelled | |
| January 18 | Fringe | Fox | 2008 | Ended | |
| January 22 | Ben and Kate | Fox | 2012 | Cancelled | |
| January 22 | Private Practice | ABC | 2007 | Ended | |
| January 22 | Flashpoint | ION Television | 2008 | Ended | |
| January 23 | X-Play (returned in 2021) | G4 | 1998 | Cancelled | |
| January 23 | Attack of the Show! (returned in 2021) | G4 | 2005 | Cancelled | |
| January 24 | Last Resort | ABC | 2012 | Cancelled | |
| January 28 | Tron: Uprising | Disney XD | 2012 | Cancelled | |
| January 31 | 30 Rock (returned in 2020 as 30 Rock: A One-Time Special) | NBC | 2006 | Ended | |
| February 2 | Victorious | Nickelodeon | 2010 | Ended | |
| February 5 | Emily Owens, M.D. | The CW | 2012 | Cancelled | |
| February 6 | Love You, Mean It with Whitney Cummings | E! | 2012 | Cancelled | |
| February 7 | Buckwild | MTV | 2012 | Cancelled | |
| February 7 | Do No Harm | NBC | 2013 | Cancelled | |
| February 14 | Handy Manny | Disney Jr. | 2006 | Ended | |
| February 15 | Planet Sheen | Nicktoons | 2010 | Cancelled | |
| February 15 | The Job | CBS | 2013 | Cancelled | |
| February 18 | Pair of Kings | Disney XD | 2010 | Cancelled | |
| February 19 | Level Up | Cartoon Network | 2012 | Cancelled | |
| February 22 | CSI: NY | CBS | 2004 | Cancelled | |
| February 25 | Bunheads | ABC Family | 2012 | Cancelled | |
| February 27 | Guys with Kids | NBC | 2012 | Cancelled | |
| February 28 | Zero Hour | ABC | 2013 | Cancelled | |
| March 3 | Enlightened | HBO | 2011 | Cancelled | |
| March 5 | The Joe Schmo Show (returned in 2025) | Spike | 2003 | Cancelled | |
| March 7 | Delocated | Adult Swim | 2008 | Cancelled | |
| March 12 | The Lying Game | ABC Family | 2011 | Cancelled | |
| March 16 | Green Lantern: The Animated Series | Cartoon Network | 2012 | Cancelled | |
| March 18 | Deception | NBC | 2013 | Cancelled | |
| March 22 | Malibu Country | ABC | 2012 | Cancelled | |
| March 27 | Whitney | NBC | 2011 | Cancelled | |
| March 28 | 1600 Penn | NBC | 2013 | Cancelled | |
| March 31 | 190 North | WLS-TV/Chicago | 1998 | Cancelled | |
| April 2 | The New Normal | NBC | 2012 | Cancelled | |
| April 5 | Scooby-Doo! Mystery Incorporated | Cartoon Network | 2010 | Ended | |
| April 8 | Monday Mornings | TNT | 2013 | Cancelled | |
| April 11 | Go On | NBC | 2012 | Cancelled | |
| April 11 | Incredible Crew | Cartoon Network | 2012 | Cancelled | |
| April 15 | After Lately | E! | 2009 | Cancelled | |
| April 17 | Southland | TNT | 2009 | Cancelled | |
| April 19 | Out There | IFC | 2013 | Cancelled | |
| April 23 | Ready for Love | NBC | 2013 | Cancelled | |
| April 27 | Marvin Marvin | Nickelodeon | 2012 | Cancelled | |
| April 27 | Supah Ninjas | Nickelodeon | 2011 | Cancelled | |
| May 1 | Bucket & Skinner's Epic Adventures | TeenNick | 2011 | Cancelled | |
| May 3 | Happy Endings (returned in 2020 as Happy Endings Special Charity Event) | ABC | 2011 | Cancelled | |
| May 5 | Red Widow | ABC | 2013 | Cancelled | |
| May 10 | Touch | Fox | 2012 | Cancelled | |
| May 10 | Vegas | CBS | 2012 | Cancelled | |
| May 13 | 90210 | The CW | 2008 | Cancelled | |
| May 14 | Golden Boy | CBS | 2013 | Cancelled | |
| May 16 | The Office | NBC | 2005 | Ended | |
| May 19 | The Cleveland Show | Fox | 2009 | Cancelled | |
| May 20 | Rules of Engagement | CBS | 2007 | Cancelled | |
| May 20 | The Big C | Showtime | 2010 | Cancelled | |
| May 20 | Anderson Live | Syndication | 2011 | Cancelled | |
| May 21 | The Jeremy Kyle Show | Syndication | 2011 | Cancelled | |
| May 22 | Judge Joe Brown | Syndication | 1998 | Cancelled | |
| May 26 | Smash | NBC | 2012 | Cancelled | |
| May 28 | Body of Proof | ABC | 2011 | Cancelled | |
| May 31 | Merlin | Syfy | 2010 | Ended | |
| June 3 | The Secret Life of the American Teenager | ABC Family | 2008 | Ended | |
| June 9 | Army Wives | Lifetime | 2007 | Cancelled | |
| June 16 | The Client List | Lifetime | 2012 | Cancelled | |
| June 19 | The Ricki Lake Show | Syndication | 2012 | Cancelled | |
| June 21 | Rock Center with Brian Williams | NBC | 2011 | Cancelled | |
| June 24 | Oh Sit! | The CW | 2012 | Cancelled | |
| June 26 | How to Live with Your Parents (For the Rest of Your Life) | ABC | 2013 | Cancelled | |
| June 27 | Does Someone Have to Go? | Fox | 2013 | Cancelled | |
| July 6 | Brooklyn DA | CBS | 2013 | Cancelled | |
| July 7 | Family Tree | HBO | 2013 | Cancelled | |
| July 9 | Betty White's Off Their Rockers (returned in 2014) | NBC | 2012 | Cancelled | |
| July 10 | Family Tools | ABC | 2013 | Cancelled | |
| July 10 | The American Baking Competition | CBS | 2013 | Cancelled | |
| July 12 | Cult | The CW | 2013 | Cancelled | |
| July 12 | The Backyardigans | Nickelodeon | 2004 | Cancelled | |
| July 13 | 666 Park Avenue | ABC | 2012 | Cancelled | |
| July 21 | The Chris Matthews Show | Syndication | 2002 | Ended | |
| July 25 | Big Time Rush | Nickelodeon | 2009 | Ended | |
| July 26 | Transformers: Prime | The Hub | 2010 | Cancelled | |
| August 18 | Whodunnit? | ABC | 2013 | Cancelled | |
| August 25 | Speed Racer: The Next Generation | Nicktoons | 2008 | Cancelled | |
| August 26 | The Glades | A&E | 2010 | Cancelled | |
| August 26 | Get Out Alive with Bear Grylls | NBC | 2013 | Cancelled | |
| August 27 | The Looney Tunes Show | Cartoon Network | 2011 | Cancelled | |
| August 31 | Fox News Watch | Fox News Channel | 1997 | Cancelled | |
| September 4 | Futurama (returned in 2023) | Comedy Central | 1999 | Cancelled | |
| September 4 | The Jeff Probst Show | Syndication | 2012 | Cancelled | |
| September 10 | Property Envy | Bravo | 2013 | Cancelled | |
| September 11 | Camp | NBC | 2013 | Cancelled | |
| September 12 | Burn Notice | USA Network | 2007 | Ended | |
| September 13 | This Week in Northern California | KQED 9/San Francisco | 1990 | Ended | |
| September 16 | Siberia | NBC | 2013 | Cancelled | |
| September 16 | Breaking Pointe | The CW | 2012 | Cancelled | |
| September 22 | Dexter (returned in 2021 and 2025) | Showtime | 2006 | Ended | |
| September 22 | Wendell & Vinnie | Nickelodeon | 2013 | Cancelled | |
| September 25 | Capture | The CW | 2013 | Cancelled | |
| September 26 | Owner's Manual | AMC | 2013 | Cancelled | |
| September 27 | America Live with Megyn Kelly | Fox News Channel | 2010 | Cancelled | |
| September 27 | Perfect Score | The CW | 2013 | Cancelled | |
| September 29 | Breaking Bad (returned in 2019 as El Camino: A Breaking Bad Movie) | AMC | 2008 | Ended | |
| October 3 | The Pitch | AMC | 2012 | Cancelled | |
| October 6 | Low Winter Sun | AMC | 2013 | Cancelled | |
| October 7 | We Are Men | CBS | 2013 | Cancelled | |
| October 18 | What Not to Wear (returned in 2020) | TLC | 2003 | Cancelled | |
| October 23 | Ironside | NBC | 2013 | Cancelled | |
| October 29 | Nikki & Sara Live | MTV | 2013 | Cancelled | |
| October 29 | Lucky 7 | ABC | 2013 | Cancelled | |
| November 8 | Up Late with Alec Baldwin | MSNBC | 2013 | Cancelled | |
| November 10 | Shake It Up | Disney Channel | 2010 | Ended | |
| November 14 | Totally Biased with W. Kamau Bell | FXX | 2012 | Cancelled | |
| November 16 | Pound Puppies | The Hub | 2010 | Ended | |
| November 17 | Eastbound & Down | HBO | 2009 | Ended | |
| December 2 | Mad | Cartoon Network | 2010 | Ended | |
| December 7 | The Fresh Beat Band | Nick Jr. | 2009 | Ended | |
| December 13 | NTSF:SD:SUV:: | Adult Swim | 2011 | Cancelled | |
| December 16 | Chrissy & Mr. Jones | VH1 | 2012 | Cancelled | |
| December 19 | The X Factor | Fox | 2011 | Cancelled | |
| December 20 | Welcome to the Family | NBC | 2013 | Cancelled | |
| December 27 | Nikita | The CW | 2010 | Ended | |
| December 28 | Kaijudo | The Hub | 2012 | Cancelled | |

=== Made-for-TV movies and miniseries ===
| Premiere date | Title | Channel | Source |
|---|---|---|---|
| February 26 | Parade's End | HBO | |
| March 3 | The Bible | History | |
| March 15 | The Wizards Return: Alex vs. Alex | Disney Channel | |
| March 18 | Top of the Lake | Sundance | |
| March 24 | Phil Spector | HBO | |
| May 26 | Behind the Candelabra | HBO | |
| June 1 | Deadly Spa | Lifetime | |
| June 8 | The Good Mother | Lifetime | |
| June 15 | Gone Missing | Lifetime | |
| June 15 | Playing Father | Hallmark Channel | |
| June 22 | Jodi Arias: Dirty Little Secret | Lifetime | |
| June 29 | Anna Nicole | Lifetime | |
| June 29 | Star Spangled Banner | Hallmark Channel | |
| July 11 | Sharknado | Syfy | |
| July 19 | Teen Beach Movie | Disney Channel | |
| August 1 | Our Nixon | CNN | |
| August 8 | Invasion Roswell | Syfy | |
| August 10 | Clear History | HBO | |
| August 10 | Reading, Writing & Romance | Hallmark Channel | |
| August 17 | This Magic Moment | Hallmark Movie Channel | |
| August 17 | Baby Sellers | Lifetime Network | |
| August 22 | Ghost Shark | Syfy | |
| August 24 | Garage Sale Mystery | Hallmark Movie Channel | |
| August 24 | Swindle | Nickelodeon | |
| September 4 | The Flag | CNN | |
| September 5 | Ragin Cajun Redneck Gators | SyFy | |
| September 6 | Dear Dumb Diary | Hallmark Channel | |
| September 7 | A Sister's Nightmare | Lifetime | |
| September 14 | Sins of the Preacher | Lifetime | |
| September 14 | Robocroc | Syfy | |
| September 14 | Friend Request | Hallmark Movie Channel | |
| September 20 | The Watsons Go to Birmingham | Hallmark Channel | |
| September 21 | Taken: The Search For Sophie Parker | Lifetime | |
| September 28 | The Cheating Pact | Lifetime | |
| October 4 | Transformers Prime Beast Hunters: Predacons Rising | Hub Network | |
| October 5 | House of Versace | Lifetime | |
| October 5 | Dead Letters | Hallmark Channel | |
| October 19 | The Mystery Cruise | Hallmark Channel | |
| October 19 | Missing at 17 | Lifetime | |
| October 21 | Crazy, Sexy, Cool: The TLC Story | VH1 | |
| October 24 | Blackfish | CNN | |
| October 25 | The Hunters | Hallmark | |
| October 26 | The Husband She Met Online | Lifetime | |
| November 8 | Pete's Christmas | Hallmark Channel | |
| November 9 | Snow Bride | Hallmark Channel | |
| November 10 | A Very Merry Mix-up | Hallmark Channel | |
| November 16 | The Christmas Ornament | Hallmark Channel | |
| November 17 | Catch a Christmas | Hallmark Channel | |
| November 17 | Letters To Jackie: Remembering President Kennedy | TLC | |
| November 22 | An Adventure in Space and Time | BBC America | |
| November 23 | Window Wonderland | Hallmark Channel | |
| November 24 | Fir Crazy | Hallmark Channel | |
| November 29 | Jinxed | Nickelodeon | |
| November 30 | Let It Snow | Hallmark Channel | |
| December 1 | The Christmas Spirit | Hallmark Channel | |
| December 1 | Christmas in Conway | ABC | |
| December 5 | The Sound of Music Live! | NBC | |
| December 7 | Santa Switch | Hallmark Channel | |
| December 8 | Holidaze | ABC Family | |
| December 8–9 | Bonnie and Clyde: Dead and Alive | A&E, History, Lifetime (simultaneous airing) | |
| December 14 | Hats Off to Christmas | Hallmark Channel | |
| December 15 | Finding Christmas | Hallmark Channel | |

== Television stations ==
=== Launches ===
| Date | Market | Station | Channel | Affiliation | Source |
|---|---|---|---|---|---|
| January 14 | Alpena, Michigan | WBKB-DT3 | 11.3 | ABC | |
| January 23 | Seattle, Washington | KFFV-DT5 | 44.5 | WeatherNation TV | |
| April 1 | Madison, Wisconsin | WMTV | 15.3 | Antenna TV | |
| September 1 | North Platte, Nebraska | KNPL-LD | 10.1 | CBS | |
| November 1 | Chicago, Illinois | WGN-TV | 9.3 | This TV | |

=== Network affiliation changes ===
The following is a list of television stations that have made or will make noteworthy network affiliation changes in 2013.

| Date | Market | Station | Channel | Prior affiliation | New affiliation | Source |
|---|---|---|---|---|---|---|
| January 31 | Evansville, Indiana | WTVW | 7.1 | Independent | The CW | |
| February 25 | Knoxville, Tennessee | WMAK | 7.1 | Daystar | Independent | |
| March 1 | Fort Wayne, Indiana | WISE-TV | 33.2 | Fox (primary), MyNetworkTV (secondary) | MyNetworkTV (exclusive) | |
| March 1 | Fort Wayne, Indiana | WFFT-TV | 55.1 | Independent | Fox | |
| March 4 | Burlington, Vermont | WPTZ | 5.2 | MeTV (exclusive) | The CW (primary), MeTV (secondary) | |
| March 4 | Burlington, Vermont | WFFF-TV | 44.2 | The CW | Independent | |
| March 11 | Indianapolis, Indiana | WDNI-CD | 19.1 | Independent | Telemundo | |
| March 11 | Washington, D.C. | WJLA-TV | 7.2 | The Local AccuWeather Channel | MeTV | |
| April 1 | Superior, Nebraska | KSNB-TV | 4.1 | Antenna TV (affiliation to remain on 4.2) | MyNetworkTV | |
| April 17 | Boise, Idaho | KIVI-TV | 6.3 | Retro Television Network | The Nashville Network | |
| May 24 | Jackson, Mississippi | WRBJ | 34.1 | The CW | TBN | |
| June 12 | Columbus, Ohio | WBNS-TV | 10.2 | The Local AccuWeather Channel | Antenna TV | |
| July 1 | Charlotte, North Carolina | WCCB | 18.1 | Fox | The CW | |
| July 1 | Charlotte, North Carolina | WJZY | 46.1 | The CW | Fox | |
| July 1 | Milwaukee, Wisconsin | WDJT-TV | 58.4 | Shorewest TV (Time-buy Real estate listings) | TouchVision | |
| August 1 | Panama City, Florida | WMBB-TV | 13.2 | This TV | MeTV | |
| August 1 | New Orleans | WLAE | 32.1 | PBS | Educational Independent | |
| August 20 | New York, New York | WRNN-TV | 48.2 | Al Jazeera English | Blue Ocean Network | |
| September 30 | Wilmington, North Carolina | WWAY | 3.2 | Retro Television Network | The CW | |
| September 30 | Jackson, Mississippi | WJTV | 12.2 | Weather Radar | The CW | |
| October 14 | Macon, Georgia | WMAZ-TV | 13.2 | Weather Radar | The CW | |
| October 31 | Flint/Tri-Cities, Michigan | WJRT-TV | 12.3 | The Local AccuWeather Channel | WeatherNation TV | |
| November 1 | Chicago, Illinois | WCIU-TV | 26.5 | This TV | Bounce TV | |

=== Closures ===
| Date | Market | Station | Channel | Affiliation | Sign-on date | Source |
|---|---|---|---|---|---|---|
| January 3 | Evansville, Indiana | WAZE/WJPS/WIKY | 17/4/5 | The CW | October 15, 1983 (WAZE on Ch. 19); 1985 (WJPS); 2005 (WIKY); March 24, 2011 (LPTV simulcasts) | |
| June 30 | Marion & Norton, Virginia | WMSY-TV/ WSBN-TV | 47/52 | PBS | March 30, 1971 (WSBN-TV); August 1, 1981 (WMSY-TV) (both satellites of WBRA-TV/Roanoke, Virginia) | |
| October 10 | Las Vegas, Nevada | KTUD-CD | 25 | IND | February 12, 1999 | |

== Deaths ==
=== January ===
| Date | Name | Age | Notability | Source |
|---|---|---|---|---|
| Jan. 1 | Patti Page | 85 | Singer, songwriter, actress, and television personality (Credits include Music Hall, United States Steel Hour, The Big Record and The Patti Page Show) | |
| Jan. 1 | Barbara Werle | 84 | Actress (McHale's Navy, Channing, Mister Roberts, Laredo, The Road West, Ironside, The Virginian and San Francisco International Airport) | |
| Jan. 2 | Jim Boyd | 79 | Actor and puppeteer, known for his role of J. Arthur Crank and others in The Electric Company | |
| Jan. 2 | Ned Wertimer | 89 | Actor, best known as Ralph Hart on The Jeffersons | |
| Jan. 4 | Tony Lip | 82 | Actor (Carmine Lupertazzi on The Sopranos) | |
| Jan. 7 | Huell Howser | 67 | TV personality, narrator, voice actor, journalist (host of California's Gold on KCET/Los Angeles; Weekend host/reporter for Entertainment Tonight; news reporter for WSM-TV/Nashville and WCBS-TV/New York City) | |
| Jan. 11 | Jimmy O'Neill | 72 | American television/radio personality and actor (host of Shindig!) | |
| Jan. 14 | Conrad Bain | 89 | Actor (Arthur Harmon in Maude, Phillip Drummond in Diff'rent Strokes) | |
| Jan. 17 | Sophiya Haque | 41 | British singer, actress and television personality (House of Anubis) | |
| Jan. 23 | Susan Douglas Rubeš | 87 | Actress (Suspense, Robert Montgomery Presents, Guiding Light, Westinghouse Studio One, Street Legal Due South) | |

=== February ===
| Date | Name | Age | Notability | Ref. |
|---|---|---|---|---|
| Feb. 1 | Ed Koch | 88 | Politician (Mayor of New York City 1978–89), TV/radio personality/host (judge on The People's Court and hosting Saturday Night Live) | |
| Feb. 1 | Robin Sachs | 61 | British actor (Buffy The Vampire Slayer) | |
| Feb. 2 | John Kerr | 81 | Actor (Peyton Place, The F.B.I., Police Story) | |
| Feb. 2 | Chris Kyle | 38 | Decorated US Navy SEAL, author ("American Sniper", based on his experience as a sniper in the Iraq War) and reality television participant (Stars Earn Stripes) | |
| Feb. 8 | Elizabeth Alley | 58 | Actress (TV appearances include the recurring role of Melinda Fall in Sunset Beach and guest appearances on Diagnosis: Murder, Frasier, V.I.P., Days of Our Lives) | |
| Feb. 11 | Mark Balelo | 40 | Businessman and reality television participant (Storage Wars) | |
| Feb. 11 | Tom Aspell | 62 | New Zealand-American journalist and producer | |
| Feb. 15 | Pat Derby | 69 | Animal trainer and activist (Credits include Flipper, Lassie, Daktari and commercials featuring the Mercury pumas with Farrah Fawcett) | |
| Feb. 17 | Mindy McCready | 37 | Country singer and reality television participant (Celebrity Rehab with Dr. Drew) | |
| Feb. 19 | Lou Myers | 76 | Actor (Vernon Gaines on A Different World) | |
| Feb. 27 | Dale Robertson | 89 | Actor and director (Credits includes leading roles in Tales of Wells Fargo, The Iron Horse, Death Valley Days {co-host}, Dynasty, J.J. Starbuck) | |

=== March ===
| Date | Name | Age | Notability | Ref. |
|---|---|---|---|---|
| Mar. 1 | Bonnie Franklin | 69 | Actress and director (Ann Romano on One Day at a Time) | |
| Mar. 5 | Bill Moody | 58 | Wrestling and sport entertainment manager, promoter, businessman, and licensed mortician (Known to WWE fans as Paul Bearer and TNA as Percy Pringle III) | |
| Mar. 14 | Malachi Throne | 84 | Character actor (Notable roles include False Face in Batman and Noah Bain in It Takes a Thief) | |
| Mar. 18 | Henry Bromell | 65 | Writer and producer (Northern Exposure, I'll Fly Away, Homicide: Life on the Street, Brotherhood, Rubicon, Homeland) | |
| Mar. 19 | Lester Lewis | 46 | Comedy writer and producer (writing credits include The Office, Caroline in the City, Baby Daddy, Jonas L.A., The PJs, The Larry Sanders Show) | |
| Mar. 19 | Lori March | 90 | Actress (One Life to Live, The Edge of Night, Texas, Another Life, Another World, Guiding Light, As the World Turns) | |
| Mar. 21 | Robert Nichols | 88 | Actor (My Little Margie, It's a Great Life, Navy Log) | |
| Mar. 24 | Peter Duryea | 73 | Actor (Dragnet, Family Affair, appeared in the pilot episode of Star Trek, entitled The Cage) | |
| Mar. 26 | Don Payne | 48 | Screenwriter (The Simpsons, Veronica's Closet, Hope and Gloria) | |
| Mar. 30 | Phil Ramone | 79 | Record producer (won an Emmy Award for best sound editing for Duke Ellington...We Love You Madly in 1973) | |
| Mar. 31 | Helena Carroll | 84 | Actress (General Hospital, Edge of Night, Loving Couples, Laverne and Shirley, Murder She Wrote) | |

=== April ===
| Date | Name | Age | Notability | Ref. |
|---|---|---|---|---|
| Apr. 2 | Jane Henson | 78 | Puppeteer and widow of Jim Henson (Sam and Friends, The Muppet Show) | |
| Apr. 2 | Milo O'Shea | 86 | Character actor (Cheers, The West Wing) | |
| Apr. 3 | Jean Sincere | 93 | Actress (Lux Video Theatre, Glee, iCarly) | |
| Apr. 3 | William H. Ginsburg | 70 | Lawyer for Monica Lewinsky during her sexual scandal involving President Bill Clinton, who on February 1, 1998, became the first person to appear on five major Sunday morning talk shows on the same day: This Week, Fox News Sunday, Face the Nation, Meet the Press, and Late Edition on CNN, which later became known as "The Full Ginsburg" | |
| Apr. 4 | Roger Ebert | 70 | Film critic, reviewer, historian, screenwriter, author and preservationist (co-creator of Sneak Previews on WTTW/Chicago and At the Movies, which had three runs: 1982–90, 1986–2010, and 2011–12) | |
| Apr. 8 | Annette Funicello | 70 | Actress and singer (original Mouseketeer on The Mickey Mouse Club, Make Room for Daddy, A Dream Is a Wish Your Heart Makes: The Annette Funicello Story, her last acting role, playing herself in present-day scenes) | |
| Apr. 11 | Jonathan Winters | 87 | Comedian and actor (Davis Rules, Mork & Mindy, The Completely Mental Misadventures of Ed Grimley) | |
| Apr. 13 | Frank Bank | 71 | Actor (Lumpy Rutherford in Leave It to Beaver and The New Leave It to Beaver) | |
| Apr. 14 | Christine White | 86 | Actress (Perry Mason, The Loretta Young Show, The Twilight Zone and Ichabod and Me) | |
| Apr. 16 | Pat Summerall | 82 | Sportscaster and journalist with CBS and Fox Sports | |
| Apr. 19 | Allan Arbus | 95 | Actor (Dr. Sidney Freedman on M*A*S*H) | |
| Apr. 20 | Glenn Cannon | 80 | Actor (Alfred Hitchcock Presents, 77 Sunset Strip, The Outer Limits, Combat!, Hawaii Five-O, Magnum, P.I., Jake and the Fatman, Lost) | |
| Apr. 25 | Virginia Gibson | 88 | Dancer, singer and actress (Studio 57, The Colgate Comedy Hour, The Johnny Carson Show, So This Is Hollywood) | |
| Apr. 26 | George Jones | 81 | Country music singer (Notable appearances include Hee Haw, That Good Old Nashville Music and the 2008 Kennedy Center Honors) | |
| Apr. 26 | Jacqueline Brookes | 82 | Actress (The Secret Storm, Another World, Lou Grant, Ryan's Hope, Miami Vice, The Equalizer, Law & Order and Star Trek: The Next Generation) | |
| Apr. 28 | Jack Shea | 84 | Director (The Jeffersons, Designing Women) and president of the Directors Guild of America, 1997–2002 | |

=== May ===
| Date | Name | Age | Notability | Ref. |
|---|---|---|---|---|
| May 1 | Chris Kelly | 34 | Rapper, known as "Mac Daddy" of the duo Kris Kross (In Living Color, A Different World and Rugrats) | |
| May 3 | Mario Machado | 78 | Newscaster, actor, producer and sports announcer (Alumni of KNXT and KHJ/Los Angeles and voice of NASL and FIFA World Cup broadcasts) | |
| May 8 | Jeanne Cooper | 84 | Actress (Katherine Chancellor on The Young and the Restless since 1973, recurring regular on L.A. Law, playing alongside real-life son and series regular Corbin Bernsen) | |
| May 9 | Ron Weaver | 75 | Producer (The Bold and the Beautiful, Sesame Street) | |
| May 10 | Laurence Haddon | 90 | Actor (Dr. Kildare, Dennis the Menace, Hazel, Barnaby Jones, Trapper John, M.D., Lou Grant, Dallas, Knots Landing) | |
| May 13 | Dr. Joyce Brothers | 85 | Psychologist and TV personality (hosted her own syndicated series; winner on The $64,000 Question for her knowledge on boxing; Hollywood Squares, etc.) | |
| May 14 | Brian Kahle | — | American news anchor and emcee (KHJ-TV/Los Angeles, AM Buffalo on WKBW-TV) | |
| May 15 | Linden Chiles | 80 | Character actor (East Side/West Side, Perry Mason, The Virginian, The F.B.I., Banacek, Cannon, The Streets of San Francisco, James at 16) | |
| May 17 | Alan O'Day | 72 | Singer/songwriter (Composed and performed music for Muppet Babies and Really Wild Animals) | |
| May 17 | Ken Venturi | 82 | Professional golfer (champion of the 1964 US Open) and analyst for PGA Tour on CBS | |
| May 18 | Steve Forrest | 87 | Actor (Lt. Dan "Hondo" Harrelson in The Rookies and its spin-off S.W.A.T.) | |
| May 24 | Ed Shaughnessy | 84 | Musician and jazz drummer (bandmember for The Tonight Show Starring Johnny Carson) | |
| May 28 | Don Oliver | 76 | Correspondent for NBC News | |
| May 31 | Jean Stapleton | 90 | Actress (Edith Bunker in All in the Family and its spin-off Archie Bunker's Place) | |
| May 31 | Tim Samaras | 55 | A group of meteorologists and professional storm chasers known as TWISTEX in the Discovery Channel's show Storm Chasers | |
| May 31 | Paul Samaras | 24 | A group of meteorologists and professional storm chasers known as TWISTEX in the Discovery Channel's show Storm Chasers | |
| May 31 | Carl Young | 45 | A group of meteorologists and professional storm chasers known as TWISTEX in the Discovery Channel's show Storm Chasers | |

=== June ===
| Date | Name | Age | Notability | Ref. |
|---|---|---|---|---|
| June 6 | Maxine Stuart | 94 | Actress (The Edge of Night, The Rousters, and The Twilight Zone episode "Eye of the Beholder") | |
| June 19 | James Gandolfini | 51 | Actor, producer and director (Tony Soprano in The Sopranos) | |
| June 22 | Gary David Goldberg | 68 | Writer/producer (Family Ties, Brooklyn Bridge, Spin City) | |
| June 23 | Richard Matheson | 87 | Author and screenwriter (Lawman, Alfred Hitchcock Presents, The Twilight Zone, The Martian Chronicles miniseries) | |

=== July ===
| Date | Name | Age | Notability | Ref. |
|---|---|---|---|---|
| July 1 | Paul Jenkins | 74 | Actor (Professor Parks on The Waltons; M*A*S*H, Columbo, Lou Grant, Dynasty) | |
| July 7 | Joe Conley | 85 | Actor (storekeeper Ike Godsey in The Waltons) | |
| July 13 | Cory Monteith | 31 | Canadian actor (Finn Hudson on Glee; The Simpsons, The Cleveland Show, Kyle XY) | |
| July 14 | Dennis Burkley | 67 | Actor (King of the Hill, Sanford) | |
| July 20 | Helen Thomas | 92 | Journalist and author, member of The White House press corps since the Kennedy administration, and also an occasional contributor to Sunday morning talk shows | |
| July 22 | Dennis Farina | 69 | Actor, consultant, host (Detective Joe Fontana on Law & Order, Albert Lombard in Miami Vice, Detective Lt. Mike Torello on Crime Story, host of Unsolved Mysteries, Victor Pellet in In-Laws), and a member of Chicago Police Department's Burglary Division from 1968 to 1985 | |
| July 25 | Mark Corwin | 65 | Game show director (Wheel of Fortune) | |
| July 27 | Kidd Kraddick | 53 | Radio and television personality, host of the syndicated Kidd Kraddick in the Morning radio show and contributor on Dish Nation | |
| July 27 | Herb Kaplow | 86 | Journalist for NBC and ABC News | |
| July 30 | Eileen Brennan | 80 | Comedic actress (Capt. Doreen Lewis in both the film and television versions of Private Benjamin; Rowan & Martin's Laugh-In, Taxi, Newhart, Thirtysomething, Will & Grace) | |
| July 31 | Michael Ansara | 91 | Syrian-born actor (Law of the Plainsman, Broken Arrow, Star Trek, Batman: The Animated Series) | |

=== August ===
| Date | Name | Age | Notability | Ref. |
|---|---|---|---|---|
| Aug. 3 | John Palmer | 77 | Reporter for NBC Nightly News, and host of Today, NBC News at Sunrise | |
| Aug. 5 | George Duke | 67 | Jazz and contemporary musician, composer, keyboardist and arranger (Sunday Night and appearing on American Bandstand, Soul Train) | |
| Aug. 7 | Marilyn King | 82 | Singer and actress, part of The King Sisters musical family that hosted their own variety series from 1965 to 1966 and again in 1969 | |
| Aug. 8 | Karen Black | 74 | Actress, singer and songwriter (Adam-12, Mannix, Judd, for the Defense) | |
| Aug. 10 | Sean Sasser | 44 | Reality TV participant and LGBT rights activist (The Real World: San Francisco) | |
| Aug. 10 | Eydie Gormé | 84 | Singer and wife/partner of entertainer Steve Lawrence (The Tonight Show, The Hollywood Palace) | |
| Aug. 11 | Henry Polic II | 68 | Actor (Jerry Silver on Webster), voice actor (Scarecrow in Batman: The Animated Series) host (Double Talk) | |
| Aug. 12 | Gia Allemand | 29 | Reality TV participant, model, and dancer (season 14 of The Bachelor and Bachelor Pad) | |
| Aug. 15 | Lisa Robin Kelly | 43 | Actress best known as the first Laurie Forman on That '70s Show | |
| Aug. 19 | Lee Thompson Young | 29 | Actor (Jett Jackson on The Famous Jett Jackson, Detective Barry Frost on Rizzoli & Isles) | |
| Aug. 20 | Ted Post | 95 | TV/film director (Gunsmoke, The Twilight Zone, Peyton Place) | |
| Aug. 20 | Elmore Leonard | 87 | Author (created the characters in the TV shows Maximum Bob, Karen Sisco, and Justified) | |
| Aug. 24 | Julie Harris | 87 | Actress (Lilimae Clements on Knots Landing; Thicker than Water, The Family Holvak) | |
| Aug. 25 | William Froug | 91 | Writer and producer (The Twilight Zone, Gilligan's Island, Bewitched) | |
| Aug. 26 | Bruce Dunning | 73 | Foreign correspondent for CBS News | |
| Aug. 31 | David Frost | 74 | British journalist and TV presenter (US work including That Was the Week That Was, Inside Edition, The Nixon Interviews) | |

=== September ===
| Date | Name | Age | Notability | Ref. |
|---|---|---|---|---|
| Sep. 8 | Cal Worthington | 92 | Car salesman/pitchman (known for his "My Dog Spot" commercials) | |
| Sep. 10 | John Hambrick | 73 | Anchor/reporter (work at WEWS-TV/Cleveland and WTVJ/Miami among other stations) and actor (Playhouse 90, Friday Night Lights) | |
| Sep. 12 | Ray Dolby | 80 | Audio engineer and founder of Dolby Laboratories, a popular manufacturer of home theater audio systems | |

=== October ===
| Date | Name | Age | Notability | Ref. |
|---|---|---|---|---|
| Oct. 1 | Tom Clancy | 66 | Author (created the characters in the TV movies NetForce and Op-Center) | |
| Oct. 16 | Ed Lauter | 74 | Character actor (Mannix, Kojak, Charlie's Angels, Magnum, P.I., Miami Vice, The X-Files, Law & Order, ER, Grey's Anatomy) | |
| Oct. 17 | Lou Scheimer | 84 | Producer (co-founder of Filmation and producer of such animated series as The Archie Show, He-Man and the Masters of the Universe, Fat Albert and the Cosby Kids) | |
| Oct. 18 | Mary Carver | 89 | Actress (Cecilia Simon on Simon & Simon) | |
| Oct. 25 | Marcia Wallace | 70 | Actress (Carol Kester on The Bob Newhart Show), voice actress (Edna Krabappel on The Simpsons), game show panelist (Password, Hollywood Squares) | |
| Oct. 29 | B.B. Andersen | 77 | Reality television participant that appeared on season one of Survivor | |

=== November ===
| Date | Name | Age | Notability | Ref. |
|---|---|---|---|---|
| Nov. 23 | Jay Leggett | 50 | Actor/writer/producer (In Living Color, ER, The Drew Carey Show, Factory) | |
| Nov. 26 | Jane Kean | 90 | Actress and singer (Trixie Norton in The Honeymooners segments of The Jackie Gleason Show) | |
| Nov. 26 | Tony Musante | 77 | Actor (Toma and Oz) | |
| Nov. 28 | Danny Wells | 72 | Actor (The Jeffersons, The Super Mario Bros. Super Show!) | |
| Nov. 28 | Brian Wood | 64 | Reporter on WNEM-TV/Flint/Tri-Cities from 1986 to 2013 | |
| Nov. 30 | Paul Crouch | 79 | Broadcasting executive and TV evangelist/host, founder of Trinity Broadcasting Network | |
| Nov. 30 | Paul Walker | 40 | Actor (Charles in Charge, Who's the Boss?, The Young and the Restless) | |

=== December ===
| Date | Name | Age | Notability | Ref. |
|---|---|---|---|---|
| Dec. 1 | Christopher Evan Welch | 48 | Actor (Rubicon, Law & Order, Elementary) | |
| Dec. 2 | Bill Beckwith | 38 | Building contractor and TV personality (co-host of HGTV's Curb Appeal) | |
| Dec. 6 | Kate Williamson | 82 | Actress (Mrs. Rogers in Ellen and guest roles in Life Goes On, Seinfeld) | |
| Dec. 8 | Don Mitchell | 70 | Actor (Detective Mark Sanger on Ironside) | |
| Dec. 12 | Mac McGarry | 87 | TV personality (host of It's Academic) | |
| Dec. 12 | Tom Laughlin | 82 | Actor, producer, author and political activist (Climax! and Riverboat) | |
| Dec. 12 | Audrey Totter | 95 | Actress (Medical Center) | |
| Dec. 14 | Peter O'Toole | 81 | Irish producer, director, author, actor (Heaven And Hell: North And South, Book III, Crossing to Freedom, Masada) | |
| Dec. 17 | Richard Heffner | 88 | Public TV executive and personality (founder/GM of WNET/New York City; host of The Open Mind) | |
| Dec. 26 | Allan McKeown | 67 | English actor, producer and director (co-producer of Tracey Takes On... and Tracey Ullman's State of the Union with wife Tracey Ullman) | |
| Dec. 31 | James Avery | 68 | Actor (Philip Banks on The Fresh Prince of Bel-Air, Alonzo Sparks on Sparks) and voice actor (Shredder on Teenage Mutant Ninja Turtles) | |

== See also ==
- 2013 in the United States
- List of American films of 2013
