= Full Ginsburg =

Term in American politics

The "Full Ginsburg" is a term used in American politics to refer to a person who appears on all five American major Sunday morning talk shows on the same day: This Week on ABC, Fox News Sunday on Fox, Face the Nation on CBS, Meet the Press on NBC, and State of the Union on CNN. State of the Union replaced Late Edition on CNN in January 2009.

The term is named for William H. Ginsburg, the lawyer for Monica Lewinsky during the sexual conduct scandal involving President Bill Clinton. Ginsburg was the first person to accomplish this feat, on February 1, 1998.

== Completed full Ginsburgs ==
Name		Office	Reason	Date
	William H. Ginsburg	Attorney for Monica Lewinsky	Representing his client, Monica Lewinsky, as the Lewinsky scandal erupted	February 1, 1998
	Rick Lazio	Nominee for U.S. Senate in New York's 2000 Senate election, U.S. Representative from the State of New York	Announcement of candidacy in Senate election against Hillary Clinton	May 21, 2000
	William M. Daley	Secretary of Commerce	Discussion of his role as the new chairman of Al Gore's 2000 presidential campaign	June 18, 2000
	Dick Cheney	Republican nominee for Vice President of the United States, former Secretary of Defense and U.S. Representative from Wyoming	2000 Republican National Convention	July 30, 2000
	John Edwards	Democratic nominee for Vice President of the United States, United States Senator from North Carolina	Approaching presidential election	October 10, 2004
	Michael Chertoff	Secretary of Homeland Security	Hurricane Katrina	September 4, 2005
	Hillary Clinton	Junior senator from New York, candidate in 2008 presidential election	Her presidential bid	September 23, 2007
	Kathleen Sebelius	Secretary of Health and Human Services	Swine flu	May 3, 2009
	Janet Napolitano	Secretary of Homeland Security	Swine flu	May 3, 2009
	Richard Besser	Acting director for the Centers for Disease Control and Prevention	Swine flu	May 3, 2009
	Bill Clinton	Former President of the United States	Haiti earthquake	January 17, 2010
	George W. Bush	Former President of the United States	Haiti earthquake	January 17, 2010
	Rajiv Shah	Administrator of United States Agency for International Development	Haiti earthquake	January 17, 2010
	Ken Keen	Deputy commander of United States Southern Command	Haiti earthquake	January 17, 2010
	Michele Bachmann	Member of the U.S. House of Representatives	Her presidential bid	August 14, 2011
	Jack Lew	White House Chief of Staff	2012 federal budget	February 12, 2012
	Susan Rice	United States Ambassador to the United Nations	Reactions to Innocence of Muslims and the attack on the U.S. diplomatic mission in Benghazi	September 16, 2012
	Timothy Geithner	United States Secretary of the Treasury	Fiscal cliff	December 2, 2012
	Jeb Bush	Former Governor of Florida	Promoting his book Immigration Wars: Forging an American Solution	March 10, 2013
	Marco Rubio	United States Senator from Florida	Immigration reform	April 14, 2013
	Daniel Pfeiffer	Senior advisor to the president for strategy and communications	Addressing the IRS Tea Party investigation, Associated Press records seizures, and investigation of response to the 2012 Benghazi attack	May 19, 2013
	John Kerry	United States Secretary of State	Addressing possible military action against Syria by the United States	September 1, 2013
	Denis McDonough	White House Chief of Staff	Addressing possible military action against Syria by the United States	September 8, 2013
	Jack Lew	United States Secretary of the Treasury	2013 United States government shutdown	October 6, 2013
	John Kerry	United States Secretary of State	Addressing Malaysia Airlines Flight 17 and Operation Protective Edge	July 20, 2014
	Denis McDonough	White House Chief of Staff	Following up on the 2015 State of the Union Address	January 25, 2015
	Robert Sumwalt	NTSB Board Member	Discussing the 2015 Philadelphia train derailment	May 17, 2015
	Paul Ryan	Speaker of the U.S. House of Representatives	Discussion of his role as the new Speaker of the U.S. House of Representatives	November 1, 2015
	Marco Rubio	United States Senator from Florida	His presidential bid	February 14, 2016
	Marco Rubio	United States Senator from Florida	His presidential bid	February 21, 2016
	Ted Cruz	United States Senator from Texas	His presidential bid	February 28, 2016
	Tim Kaine	United States Senator and former Governor of Virginia	His vice presidential bid	September 18, 2016
	Rudy Giuliani	Former Mayor of New York City	2016 presidential election on behalf of Donald Trump presidential campaign	October 9, 2016
	Jay Sekulow	Member of President Donald Trump's legal team and chief counsel for the American Center for Law and Justice	Donald Trump Jr. and Jared Kushner's meeting with Russian lawyer Natalia Veselnitskaya	July 16, 2017
	Mike Pompeo	United States Secretary of State	President Trump canceling secret talks with the Taliban	September 8, 2019
	Mike Pompeo	United States Secretary of State	President Trump ordering the killing of Qasem Soleimani, the highest military commander in Iran	January 5, 2020
	Pete Buttigieg	Former mayor of South Bend, Indiana	His presidential campaign	February 9, 2020
	Anthony Fauci	Head of the National Institute of Allergy and Infectious Diseases	COVID-19 pandemic in the United States	March 15, 2020
	Joe Manchin	United States Senator from West Virginia	Inflation Reduction Act of 2022	July 31, 2022 (Note: Appearances made using video teleconferencing rather than in-person appearances in the studio.)
	John Lauro	Attorney for former President Donald Trump	Federal prosecution of Donald Trump (election obstruction case)	August 6, 2023
	John Kirby	Biden administration White House National Security Communications Advisor	2024 Iranian strikes in Israel	April 14, 2024
	Chris Van Hollen	United States Senator from Maryland	Trip to El Salvador to meet Kilmar Abrego Garcia	April 20, 2025
Tim Scott's official Portrait	Tim Scott	United States Senator from South Carolina	Death of Senator Lindsey Graham (R-SC)	July 12, 2026
	Sean Duffy	United States Secretary of Transportation	2026 FAA nationwide ground stop	November 15, 2026

== People who have completed multiple full Ginsburgs ==
Name	Dates	Total
Marco Rubio	April 14, 2013	3
Marco Rubio	February 14, 2016	3
Marco Rubio	February 21, 2016	3
Jack Lew	February 12, 2012	2
Jack Lew	October 6, 2013	2
John Kerry	September 1, 2013	2
John Kerry	July 20, 2014	2
Denis McDonough	September 8, 2013	2
Denis McDonough	January 25, 2015	2
Mike Pompeo	September 8, 2019	2
Mike Pompeo	January 5, 2020	2

== Variations ==
On September 20, 2009, President Barack Obama, to promote his health care reform proposals, did what Politico called a "modified Full Ginsburg" when he appeared on five programs, opting for Univision's Spanish-language Al Punto to be his fifth program appearance instead of Fox News Sunday.

Obama also appeared on Monday, September 9, 2013, with reporters from each of the five networks, plus an extra sixth, to discuss possible military intervention in Syria. He appeared with CNN's Wolf Blitzer on The Situation Room, with ABC's Diane Sawyer on ABC World News, with NBC's Savannah Guthrie on NBC Nightly News, with CBS's Scott Pelley on CBS Evening News and with Fox's Chris Wallace on Fox News's Special Report with Bret Baier, in addition to PBS's Gwen Ifill on PBS NewsHour.

The first person to appear on all six shows in the same week was former governor of Florida Jeb Bush, who achieved the feat on March 10, 2013.

Florida Sen. Marco Rubio became the first person to appear on seven Sunday talk shows the same day, on April 14, 2013: all English-language shows listed above, plus Univision's Al Punto and Telemundo's Enfoque, both American Spanish-language shows.
