= Tom Aspell =

- Born: 1950; New Zealand
- Died: February 11, 2013 (aged 62–63)
- Occupation: Television journalist
- Years active: 43
- Employer: NBC News
- Title: News Producer/Correspondent
- Spouse: Nujud Dabbagh
- Children: 2 sons (Peter and Tiger)

Tom Aspell (1950 – February 11, 2013) was a New Zealand-born U.S. television news producer, foreign correspondent, and cameraman. He was employed by NBC News for 28 years and previously worked for ABC News, CBS News, and Visnews.

== Career ==
Aspell began his career as a scriptwriter and cameraman in 1970 with Visnews. He was among the few foreign journalists who remained in Southeast Asia when Saigon fell to communist forces on April 30, 1975. From 1975 to 1978, he was a freelance cameraman in the Middle East. In 1978, he joined CBS News as a cameraman covering Beirut, where he then worked as a producer for ABC News from 1981 to 1983.

In 1985, he was hired by NBC News as a producer based in Cyprus. He then became a foreign correspondent covering major events around the world. His first on-air report for NBC was from Baghdad in August 1990 after Iraq invaded Kuwait. From 1992 on, he spent considerable time covering the war-torn region of Bosnia.

== Personal life ==
Aspell lived on Cyprus with his wife Nujud Dabbagh and their two sons. He loved sailing.

== Death ==
Aspell died on February 11, 2013, after two years suffering from lung cancer. He was 62. Brian Williams, the anchor and managing editor of NBC Nightly News, said Aspell was a journalist with "an intense brand of cool under fire". NBC News president Steve Capus described Aspell as "understated, selfless, perpetually cool, shrewd, wry, curmudgeonly, and a damn good reporter".

== Awards ==
- National Press Photographers Association Award for coverage of the Iranian Revolution (1979)
- Emmy Award for coverage of the Romanian Revolution (1989)
- National Headliner Award for coverage of Yugoslavia (1993)
