= William H. Ginsburg =

American lawyer (1943–2013)

- Born: March 25, 1943; Philadelphia, Pennsylvania, U.S.
- Died: April 1, 2013 (aged 70); Sherman Oaks, California, U.S.
- Education: University of California, Berkeley (BA); University of Southern California (JD)
- Occupation: Lawyer
- Known for: Representing Monica Lewinsky
- Spouse: Laura
- Children: 3

William H. Ginsburg (March 25, 1943 – April 1, 2013) was an American trial lawyer who represented former White House intern Monica Lewinsky in her controversy regarding sexual activities with President Bill Clinton in 1998.

== Early life and education ==
Ginsburg was born in Philadelphia, Pennsylvania. He was the son of a lawyer who had worked on Lyndon Johnson's senate staff and Sylvia Ginsburg. He moved to Los Angeles with his family in the early 1950s. Ginsburg graduated from Hamilton High School and studied political science and drama at University of California, Berkeley, receiving a Bachelor of Arts degree in 1964. He received his Juris Doctor degree from USC Gould School of Law in 1967 and passed the California bar examination in 1968. He was a diplomate of the American Board of Trial Advocates and served as a member of the LA chapter executive committee. He was a national board member and president and trustee of the American Board of Trial Advocates Foundation.

== Career ==
Ginsburg, whose Los Angeles-based practice had previously concentrated on medical malpractice, was a friend of the Lewinsky family. Ginsburg represented Lewinsky for four months, before being fired. He also was involved in the case of the death of college basketball star Hank Gathers, as well as the legal dispute regarding the remains of entertainer Liberace and the landmark Meneeley v. National Spa & Pool Institute case over diving injuries in a sub-standard swimming pool. He tried more than 300 cases in 21 states and participated in more than 350 mediations/arbitrations.

While representing Monica Lewinsky, Ginsburg made appearances on all five of television's major Sunday morning talk shows on a single day (February 1, 1998). Since he became the first person known to have accomplished such a feat, the practice was named after him, as the "full Ginsburg." Ginsburg was portrayed by Fred Melamed in Impeachment: American Crime Story.

== Death ==
Ginsburg died of cancer on April 1, 2013, at his home in Sherman Oaks, Los Angeles, one week after his 70th birthday.
