= Craddock, Alberta =

Coordinates: 49°27′53″N 112°26′59″W

Craddock is a former unincorporated community in southern Alberta, Canada within the County of Warner No. 5. It is located between the Village of Stirling and the Hamlet of New Dayton, approximately 30 kilometres (19 mi) southeast of the City of Lethbridge on Highway 4.

== History ==
Although Craddock was once a shipping and delivery point for Alberta Wheat Pool and had two grain elevators, very little remains of the former community except for one of the two elevators. On January 15, 2002 the larger Alberta Pool elevator was destroyed and burned to the ground by arson. The elevator was only 20 years old at the time of the incident.

== Education ==
Originally named Craddock and formed on February 15, 1917, the district name was changed to Bluesky in 1947. The Bluesky School District No. 3456 was a one room schoolhouse that once stood at township 33 - 81 - 2 - W6.

== Regional attractions ==
The Devil's Coulee Dinosaur Heritage Museum features a Hadrosaur (duck-billed dinosaur) nest and embryo, ancient fossils, dinosaur models, located in the Warner.

The Galt Historic Railway Park located 1 km north of Stirling is another popular museum which displays of life and travel in the 1880s to 1920s are set up in the restored 1890 North West Territories International Train Station from Coutts, Alberta, Canada and Sweetgrass, Montana, USA. The station was moved to the current location near Stirling in 2000 and is added onto every year. Future plans to move the 1925 Oglvie grain elevator from Wrentham for display along the station in the 36-acre (150,000 m^{2}) park is still in the planning stages.

Stirling Agricultural Village is a National Historic Site of Canada, and was listed as one of only three communities in Canada designated as a National Historic Site because it is the best surviving example of a Mormon agricultural village. Located within the village are two museums; the Michelsen Farmstead, a totally restored 1900s home showcasing rural life in Alberta in the 1930s, listed as a Provincial Historic Site in 2001, and the Galt Historic Railway Park.

The Warner elevator row is a row of historic wood-cribbed grain elevators. A total of six elevators still stand in a row from south to north alongside the Canadian Pacific Railway on the east entrance of the village of Warner. Due to the loss of a vast amount of Alberta's many grain elevators, the elevator row in Warner remains the very last row of elevators in Alberta. Only two elevator rows remain in Canada, Warner's row and the elevators in Inglis, Manitoba.

Waterton Lakes National Park is a National Park located in the extreme southwest corner of Alberta, Canada, 40 km west of Cardston, and borders Glacier National Park in Montana, USA. Waterton Lakes was Canada's fourth National Park formed in 1895. The Rocky Mountains rise suddenly out of the rolling prairies in the park. Amid the peaks are the three Waterton Lakes, carved out of the rock by ancient glaciers.

Writing-on-Stone Provincial Park, is one of the largest areas of protected prairie in the Alberta park system, and serves as both a nature preserve and protection for the largest concentration of rock art, created by Plains People. There are over 50 rock art sites, with thousands of figures, as well as numerous archeological sites.

== See also ==
- List of communities in Alberta
