= Welling (disambiguation) =

Welling is a district in the London Borough of Bexley, South East London, England.

Welling may also refer to:

== People ==
- Georg von Welling (1652–1727), Bavarian alchemical and theosophical writer
- Tom Welling (born 1977), American actor
- Torsten Welling (born 1985), German politician

== Places ==
- Welling, Alberta, Canada
- Welling Station, Alberta, Canada
- Welling, Germany
- Welling, Oklahoma, United States
- Welling Beach, Wisconsin, United States

== See also ==
- Welwyn, a village in Hertfordshire, England
- Welwyn Garden City, a town in Hertfordshire, England
