= Warner, Alberta =

Warner
- Village
- Village of Warner
- Nickname: Home of the First Last Elevator Row In Alberta
- Location of Warner
- Coordinates: 49°16′58″N 112°12′28″W
- Country: Canada
- Province: Alberta
- Region: Southern Alberta
- Census Division: No. 2
- Municipal district: County of Warner No. 5
- Incorporated
  - Village: November 12, 1908

Government
  - Mayor: Tyler Lindsay
  - Governing body: Warner Village Council

Area (2021)
  - Land: 1.16 km^{2} (0.45 sq mi)
- Elevation: 1,021 m (3,350 ft)

Population (2021)
  - Total: 364
  - Density: 313.7/km^{2} (812/sq mi)
- Time zone: UTC−06:00 (Alberta Time)
- Area codes: 403, 587, 825
- Highways: 4, 36, 504
- Website: Official website

Warner is a village in Alberta, Canada. It is surrounded by the County of Warner No. 5, approximately 65 km (40 mi) south of Lethbridge. Warner is a farming community. Warner is situated at the intersection of Highway 4 and Highway 36, about 38 km north of the Montana border and Interstate 15. Warner's nearest neighbours are the towns of Stirling and Milk River.

It is home to the Devil's Coulee Dinosaur Heritage Museum.

== Demographics ==
In the 2021 Census of Population conducted by Statistics Canada, the Village of Warner had a population of 364 living in 172 of its 201 total private dwellings, a change of −2.4% from its 2016 population of 373. With a land area of 1.16 km^{2} (0.45 sq mi), it had a population density of 313.8/km^{2} (812.7/sq mi) in 2021.

In the 2016 Census of Population conducted by Statistics Canada, the Village of Warner recorded a population of 373 living in 172 of its 196 total private dwellings, a 12.7% change from its 2011 population of 331. With a land area of 1.16 km^{2} (0.45 sq mi), it had a population density of 321.6/km^{2} (832.8/sq mi) in 2016.

== Local attractions ==
Devil's Coulee Dinosaur Heritage Museum

The Devil's Coulee Dinosaur Heritage Museum features a Hadrosaur (duck-billed dinosaur) nest and embryo, ancient fossils, dinosaur models, located in the Warner.

Warner elevator row

The Warner elevator row is a row of historic wood-cribbed grain elevators. A total of four elevators still stand in a row from south to north alongside the Canadian Pacific Railway on the east entrance of the village of Warner. Only one other elevator row remains in Canada, the elevators in Inglis, Manitoba.

=== Regional attractions ===
Galt Historic Railway Park

The Galt Historic Railway Park located 1 km north of Stirling is another popular museum which displays of life and travel in the 1880s to 1920s are set up in the restored 1890 North West Territories International Train Station from Coutts, Alberta, Canada and Sweetgrass, Montana, USA. The station was moved to the current location near Stirling in 2000 and is added onto every year. Future plans to move the 1925 Ogilvie grain elevator from Wrentham for display along the station in the 36-acre (150,000 m^{2}) park is still in the planning stages.

Stirling Agricultural Village

Stirling Agricultural Village is a National Historic Site of Canada, and was listed as one of only three communities in Canada designated as a National Historic Site because of the community's well preserved settlement pattern that follows the Plat of Zion model. Located within the village are two museums the Michelsen Farmstead a totally restored 1900s home showcasing rural life in Alberta in the 1930s. Listed as a Provincial Historic Site in 2001, and the Galt Historic Railway Park.

Waterton Lakes National Park

Waterton Lakes National Park is a National Park located in the extreme southwest corner of Alberta, Canada, 40 km west of Cardston, and borders Glacier National Park in Montana, USA. Waterton Lakes was Canada's fourth National Park formed in 1895. The Rocky Mountains rise suddenly out of the rolling prairies in the park. Amid the peaks are the three Waterton Lakes, carved out of the rock by ancient glaciers.

Writing On Stone Provincial Park

Writing-on-Stone Provincial Park, is one of the largest areas of protected prairie in the Alberta park system, and serves as both a nature preserve and protection for the largest concentration of rock art, created by Plains People. There are over 50 rock art sites, with thousands of figures, as well as numerous archeological sites.

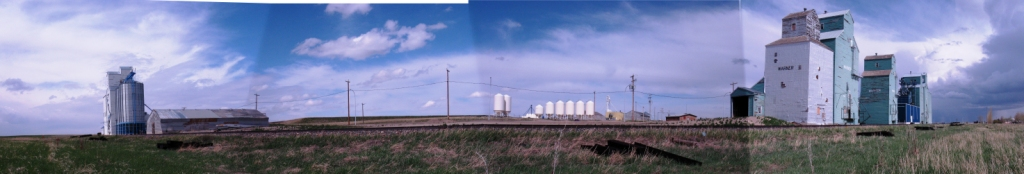

== Notable people ==
- Earl W. Bascom (1906–1995), rodeo champion, inventor, hall of fame inductee, Hollywood actor, western artist, and sculptor, worked on Aaron Ross' Bar R Ranch

== See also ==
- List of communities in Alberta
- List of villages in Alberta
