= Welling station =

Welling station may refer to:

- Welling railway station in London, England
- Welling Station, Alberta, Canada, a hamlet
