= Reis (surname) =

Reis is a common surname in the Portuguese language, namely in Portugal and Brazil. It was originally a Christian devotional family name of the Middle Ages, probably due to the Portuguese name for the Biblical Magi, the Reis Magos (the Magi Kings). Sometimes the surname is dos Reis (of the Kings). The Reis surname does not denote a single genealogical origin and there are many families bearing that surname. The Reis etymology is probably from the Latin Rex ("King"), and it is noticeable that it has relations with the German Reich ("Kingdom, Empire"), and the Dutch Rijk (also "Kingdom, Empire"), the Germanic names Rick, Rich, Richard, etc. The Spanish version of this surname is Reyes.

Reis is also a common surname in the German language (where its alternative meaning is "rice"), a historically famous epithet derived from military rank in Turkey (e.g., Piri Reis), and was also used by some European Jews.

It is a name associated with a great number of people:

- Alves dos Reis (1896–1955), Portuguese financial criminal
- António Reis (1927–1991), Portuguese film director
- Antônio Augusto Ribeiro Reis Júnior (born 1975), Brazilian footballer better known as Juninho Pernambucano
- Claire Raphael Reis (1888–1978), American music promoter
- Reis (footballer) (born 1988), nickname of Deivdy Reis Marques do Nascimento, Brazilian footballer
- Dilermando Reis (1916–1977), Brazilian guitarist and composer
- Gabriel Reis (born 1984), Brazilian water polo player
- Hilda Pires dos Reis (1919–2001), Brazilian composer
- Irving Reis (1906–1953), American radio and film director
- Johann Philipp Reis (1834–1874), German scientist and inventor
- John Reis (born 1969), American musician
- Jonathan Reis (born 1990), football player
- Martin Reis (born 1984), German politician
- Matt Reis (born 1975), American soccer player
- Max Reis (chemical engineer), chemical engineer and President of the Technion – Israel Institute of Technology
- Max Reis (racing driver) (born 2007), German racing driver
- Micaela Reis (born 1988), Angolan model
- Michelle Monique Reis (born 1970), Hong Kong actress
- Nando Reis (born 1963), Brazilian rock bass/acoustic guitarist
- Nicolau dos Reis Lobato (1946–1978), East Timorese politician
- Paola Reis (born 1999), Brazilian BMX rider
- Ricardo Reis (introduced 1924), one of the Portuguese poet Fernando Pessoa's heteronyms
- Ricardo Reis (economist) (born 1978), Portuguese economist
- Roberto Esser dos Reis, Brazilian ichthyologist
- Rodrigo Junqueira dos Reis (born 1975), Brazilian actor
- Ron Reis (born 1969), American professional wrestler
- Ronni Reis (born 1966), American tennis player
