= Wilson Siding =

Locality in southern Alberta, Canada

Coordinates: 49.5988°N 112.6432°W

Wilson Siding, also known as Wilson, is a locality in southern Alberta, Canada within the Lethbridge County. It is located at the intersection of Highway 4 and Highway 845, approximately 13 km (8.1 mi) southeast of Lethbridge. Wilson Siding gets its name from E.H. Wilson of the Alberta Railway and Irrigation Company (ARIC) when a train stop was added in 1908 after Canadian Pacific Railway bought out ARIC. It was used a watering stop for steam-powered trains.

== Grain terminals ==
Wilson Siding is known as one of the largest shipping points in southern Alberta with two concrete grain terminals. One is owned by Parrish and Heimbecker and the other, Lethbridge Inland Terminal, was built and was run by its farmer owners before being sold to Viterra.

== See also ==
- List of communities in Alberta
