= Alberta Highway 52 =

Highway in Alberta, Canada

Highway 52

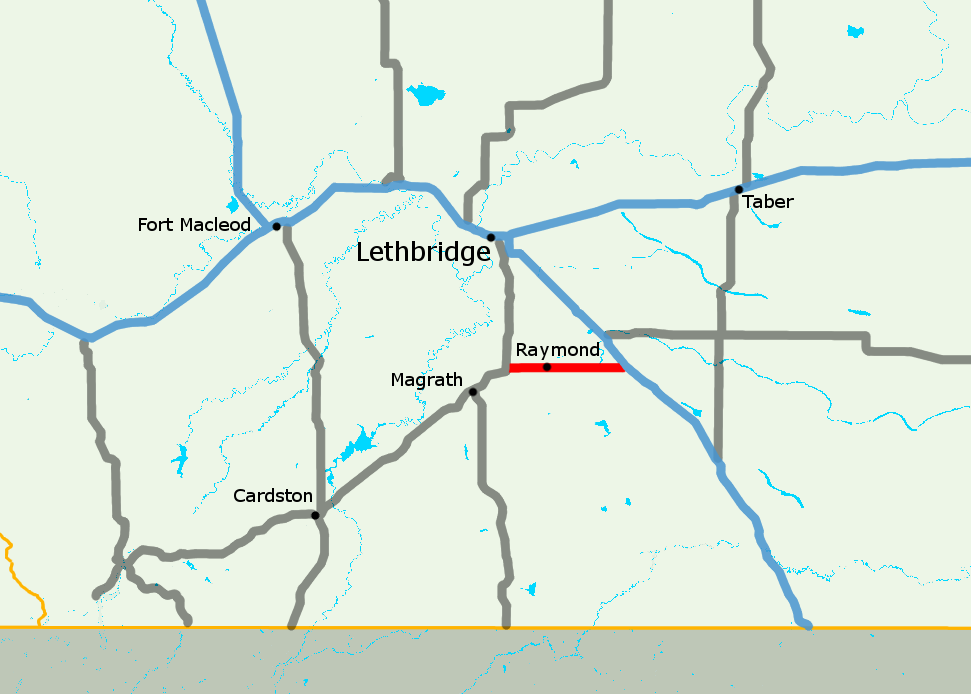
- Highway 52 highlighted in red

Route information
- Maintained by the Ministry of Transportation and Economic Corridors
- Length: 24.4 km (15.2 mi)

Major junctions
- West end: Highway 5 south of Welling
- East end: Highway 4 southeast of Stirling

Location
- Country: Canada
- Province: Alberta
- Specialized and rural municipalities: Cardston County, Warner No. 5 County
- Towns: Raymond

Highway system
- Alberta Provincial Highway Network; List; Former
← Highway 50	→ Highway 53

Alberta Provincial Highway No. 52, commonly referred to as Highway 52, is an east–west highway in southern Alberta, Canada, south of Lethbridge that connects Highway 4 to Highway 5 via Raymond.

== Major intersections ==
Rural/specialized municipality	Location	km	mi	Destinations	Notes
Cardston County		0.0	0.0	Highway 5 – Magrath, Cardston, Lethbridge	Highway 52 western terminus
County of Warner No. 5		6.5	4.0	Highway 844 south	
Raymond		8.9	5.5	Highway 845 north (Broadway) – Coaldale	
County of Warner No. 5		19.4	12.1	Highway 846 north – Stirling	
County of Warner No. 5		24.4	15.2	Highway 4 – Lethbridge, Milk River, Coutts	Highway 52 eastern terminus
1.000 mi = 1.609 km; 1.000 km = 0.621 mi
