= New Dayton =

- Hamlet
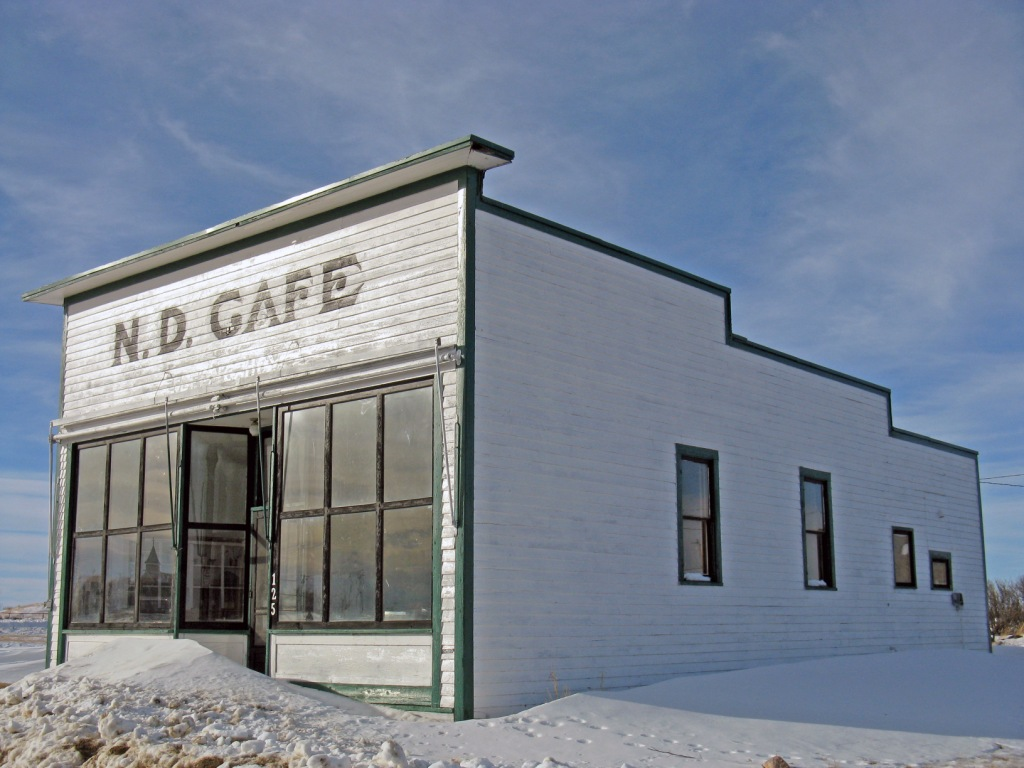
- Repainted N.D. Cafe, 2008

- Location of New Dayton New Dayton (Canada)
- Coordinates: 49°25′36″N 112°22′46″W
- Country: Canada
- Province: Alberta
- Region: Southern Alberta
- Census division: 2
- Municipal district: County of Warner No. 5

Government
  - Type: Unincorporated
  - Governing body: County of Warner No. 5 Council
  - MP: Rachael Harder
  - MLA: Grant Hunter
- Elevation: 975 m (3,199 ft)

Population (1991)
  - Total: 47
- Time zone: UTC−06:00 (Alberta Time)
- Postal code span: T0K 1P0
- Area code: +1-403
- Highways: Highway 4
- Waterways: Tyrrell Lake

New Dayton is a hamlet in southern Alberta, Canada within the County of Warner No. 5. It is located on Highway 4 between the villages of Stirling and Warner, approximately 48 kilometres (30 mi) southeast of Lethbridge. New Dayton was named for their former home by settlers from Dayton, Ohio.

== Demographics ==
Population history of New Dayton
Year	Pop.	±%
1941	95	—
1951	97	+2.1%
1956	94	−3.1%
1961	102	+8.5%
1966	89	−12.7%
1971	65	−27.0%
1976	51	−21.5%
1981	44	−13.7%
1986	65	+47.7%
1991	47	−27.7%
Source: Statistics Canada

New Dayton recorded a population of 47 in the 1991 Census of Population conducted by Statistics Canada.

== Services and amenities ==
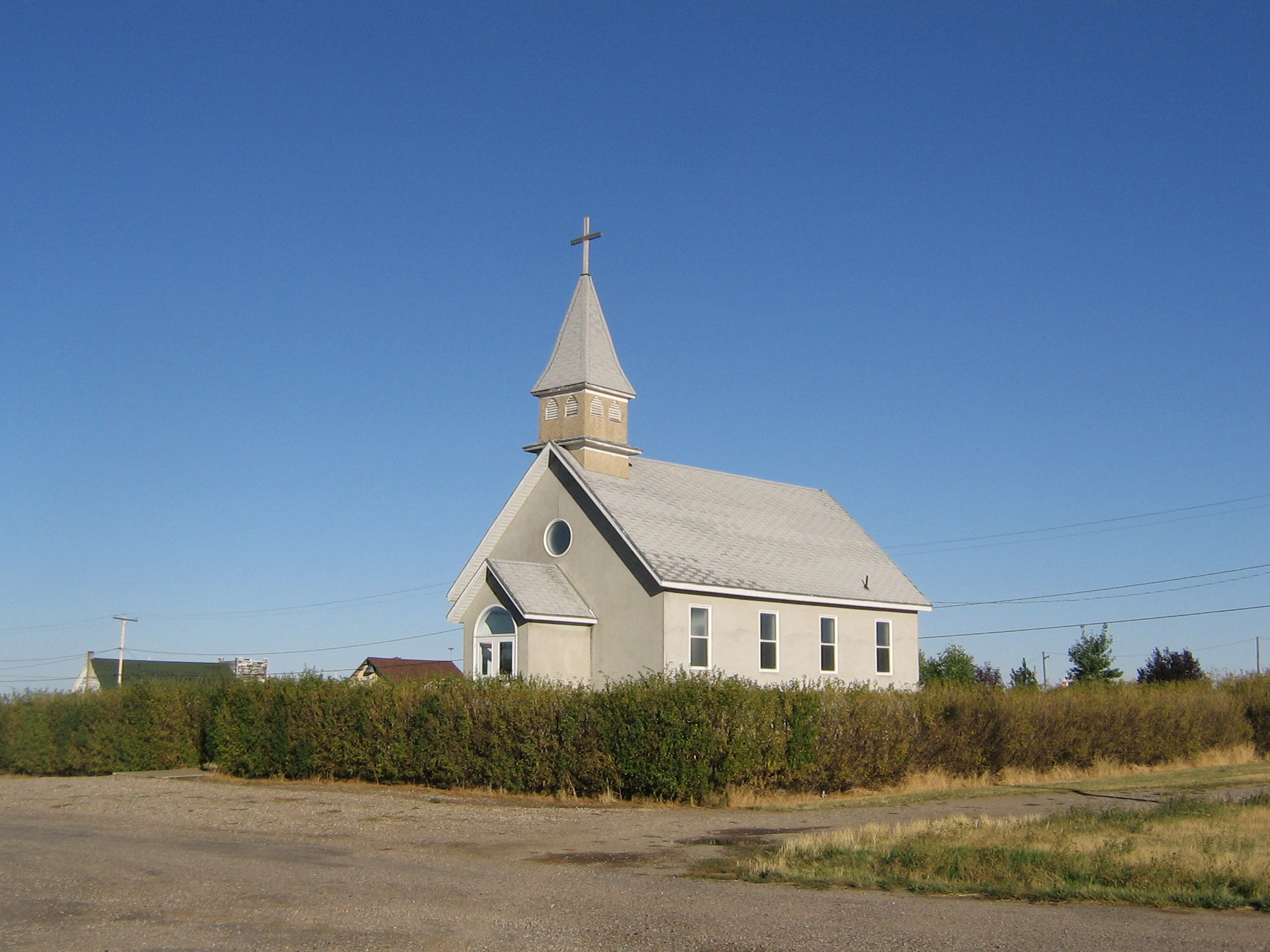
Church in New Dayton

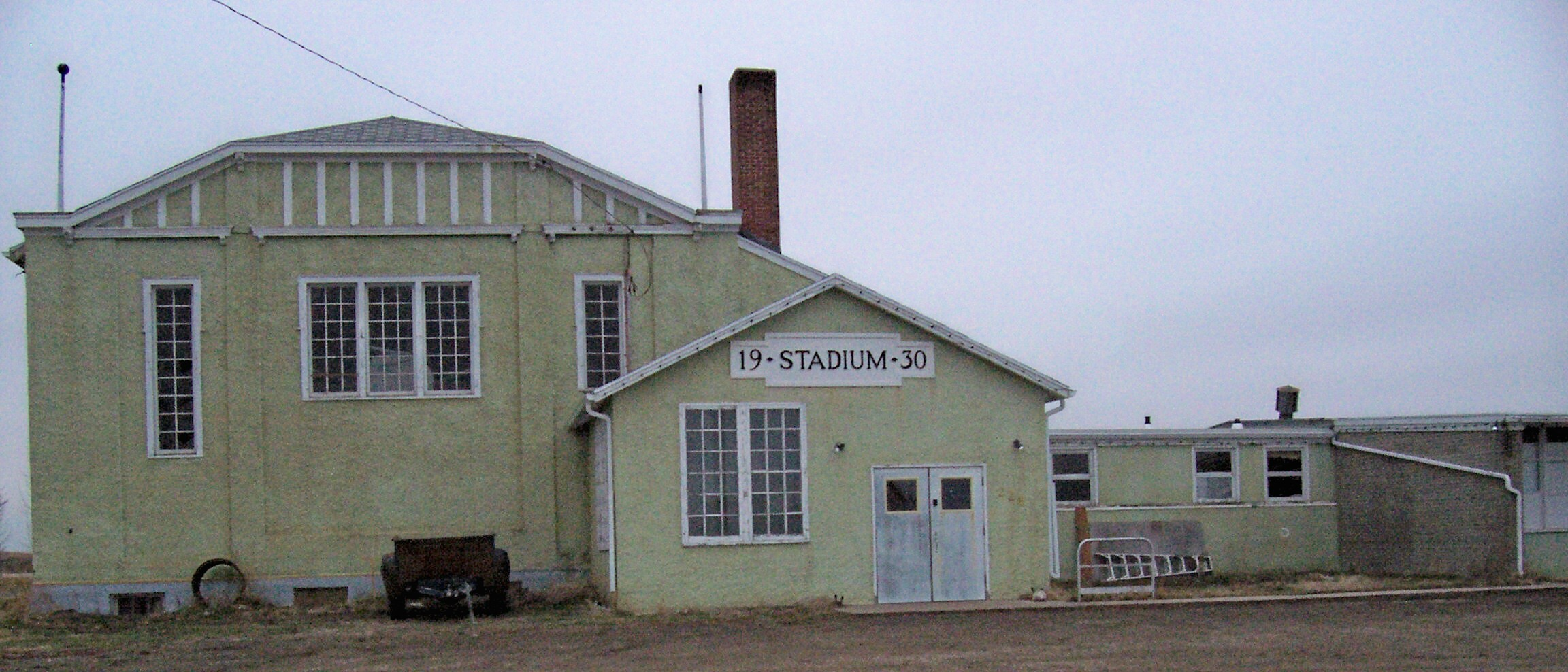
New Dayton School located in New Dayton

The hamlet has a ball diamond, a campground and a postal outlet.

== See also ==
- List of communities in Alberta
- List of hamlets in Alberta
