= Welling Station =

- Hamlet
- Location of Welling Station Welling Station (Canada)
- Coordinates: 49°27′24″N 112°47′13″W
- Country: Canada
- Province: Alberta
- Region: Southern Alberta
- Census division: 3
- Municipal district: Cardston County

Government
  - Type: Unincorporated
  - Governing body: Cardston County Council

Population (2008)
  - Total: 18
- Time zone: UTC−06:00 (Alberta Time)
- Area codes: 403, 587, 825

Welling Station is a hamlet in southern Alberta, Canada within Cardston County.

Welling Station is located on the southeast side of Highway 5 approximately 0.8 kilometres (0.50 mi) south of Highway 5's intersection with Highway 52. The hamlet is approximately 2 kilometres (1.2 mi) south of Welling, 22 kilometres (14 mi) south of Lethbridge, 8 kilometres (5.0 mi) west of Raymond and 7 kilometres (4.3 mi) northeast of Magrath.

== Demographics ==
The population of Welling Station according to the 2008 municipal census conducted by Cardston County is 18.

== Historic site ==
Welling Station is the historic site of rodeo's first side-delivery bucking chute. In 1916, rancher John W. Bascom and his sons moved to Welling Station, running cattle along Pot Hole Creek. The family produced weekend rodeos on the Bascom Ranch where they designed and made their bucking chute. Bascom and his sons - Raymond "Tommy", Melvin, Earl and Weldon - have all been honored in Canada and the United States in halls of fame as rodeo pioneers and for their contributions to the sport of rodeo. Earl Bascom later became a famous western artist and sculptor.

== See also ==
- List of communities in Alberta
- List of hamlets in Alberta
