= Alberta Highway 4 =

Highway in Alberta

Highway 4
- First Special Service Force Memorial Highway
- Highway 4 highlighted in red

Route information
- Maintained by the Ministry of Transportation and Economic Corridors
- Length: 103.369 km (64.231 mi)
- History: 1912 (Sunshine Trail); 1947 (paved); 2009 (Divided expressway complete)

Major junctions
- South end: I-15 at the U.S. border in Coutts
- Highway 36 in Warner; Highway 52 near Stirling; Highway 61 near Craddock; Highway 5 in Lethbridge
- North end: Highway 3 in Lethbridge

Location
- Country: Canada
- Province: Alberta
- Specialized and rural municipalities: County of Warner No. 5, Lethbridge County
- Major cities: Lethbridge
- Towns: Milk River
- Villages: Coutts, Warner

Highway system
- Alberta Numbered Highway Network; List; Former
← Highway 3A	→ Highway 5

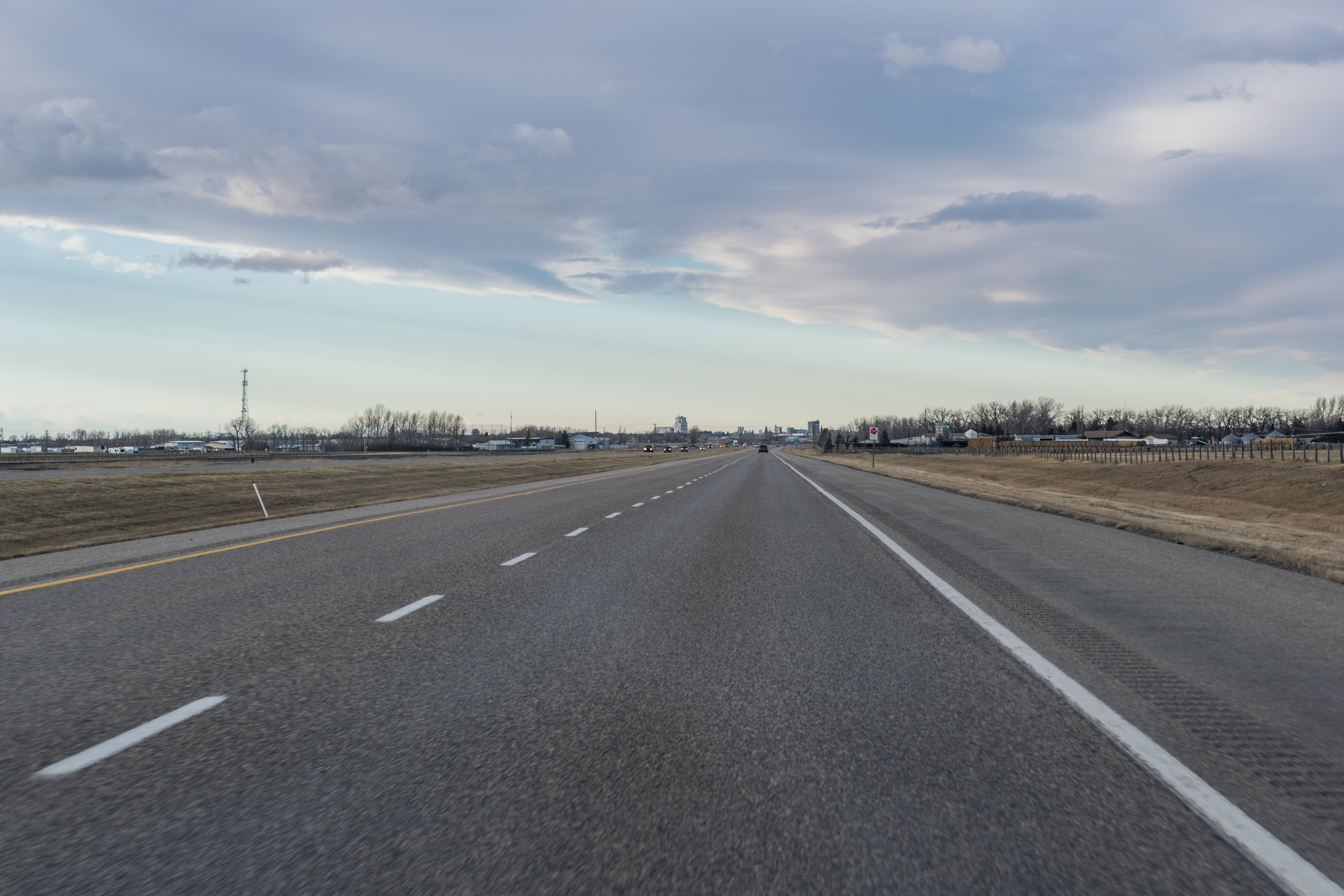
Northbound Highway 4, 2 km southeast of Lethbridge

Traffic volumes (2025) (Note: Alberta Transportation publishes yearly traffic volume data for provincial highways. The table lists the AADT at several locations along Highway 4 using data from 2025, expressed as an average daily vehicle count over the span of a year (AADT).)
Location	Volume
Coutts	1,880
Milk River	2,240
Warner	2,320
Stirling	4,000
Lethbridge
20 Ave S	16,860
S Parkside Dr	19,940
Highway 3	16,400

Highway 4 is a 103-kilometre (64 mi) highway in southern Alberta, Canada, that runs from Highway 3 in Lethbridge to Interstate 15 in Montana, United States. The highway was designated in 1999 as the First Special Service Force Memorial Highway in honour of elite soldiers who travelled to Helena, Montana, for training before World War II. The highway continues into the United States retaining that name.

It begins in Coutts at Alberta's busiest border crossing, winding north through gentle rolling hills and farmlands in the south of the province. It bypasses Milk River, Warner, and Stirling before reaching Lethbridge, where it becomes 43 Street and ends at Crowsnest Trail on the east side of the city. In 1995, it was designated as part of the CANAMEX Corridor that links Canada with Mexico and the United States, including the major cities of Salt Lake City, Las Vegas, Los Angeles, and San Diego, which lie on Interstate 15.

Between Lethbridge and Highway 61 near Stirling, Highway 4 is signed as part of the Red Coat Trail, a historic route stretching from southern Alberta into Manitoba that is advertised as approximating the path travelled by the North-West Mounted Police on their quest to the prairies.

The highway began as a trail parallel to a branch of the Canadian Pacific Railway that was built in the late 1800s connecting Lethbridge to Great Falls. It had been named the Sunshine Trail by 1912, and developed into an all-weather gravelled road by the 1930s. Paving and a realignment to eliminate curves was completed by 1947, and in the late 1980s Alberta Transportation announced plans to twin the entire length as part of upgrades to the CANAMEX Corridor south of Calgary that included Highways 2 and 3. An expressway bypass of Milk River completed all work in 2009. A bypass of Lethbridge at the highway's northern terminus is also proposed; it would link Highway 4 to a newly aligned Highway 3 north of the city, making Alberta's portion of the CANAMEX Corridor free-flowing from Coutts to Fort Macleod.

In January and February 2022, a blockade closed sections of Highway 4 near the Coutts border crossing for more than two weeks.

== Route description ==
A core route of the National Highway System, Highway 4 is identified as a key international corridor. It is a four-lane, divided highway, constructed parallel to a line of the Canadian Pacific Railway. Outside of Lethbridge and Coutts, the highway has a posted speed limit of 110 kilometres per hour (68 mph), like most other major divided highways in Alberta outside of urban areas.

Interstate 15 becomes Highway 4 as it crosses the international border between Montana and Alberta into Coutts, the only border crossing between Montana and Alberta that is open 24 hours year-round. The border crossing includes a joint Canadian and American vehicle inspection station, operated by both countries to process commercial traffic. The highway curves north out of Coutts alongside the railway to a three-way intersection with Highway 501 which leads west to Del Bonita. The two highways continue concurrently to the north, briefly paralleling Milk River. The concurrency ends and Highway 501 splits to the east into the community of Milk River, becoming Railway Street, while Highway 4 continues north across the river to bypass the town.

Highway 4 continues 16 km (9.9 mi) north to Warner, which it bypasses to the east; the original alignment of the highway was directly through the community. From Warner, Highway 36 splits to the north en route to Taber and Vauxhall. Highway 4 continues north-northwest to the Hamlet of New Dayton and an intersection with Highway 52 at Craddock, leading west to Raymond. Further north, Stirling Lake and the town of Stirling lie immediately west of Highway 4. New pavement was built east of Stirling to allow the divided highway to curve smoothly to the northeast, and a portion of the former two lane road remains. Just north of Stirling, Highway 61 splits to the east leading to Foremost. North of Stirling, the community of Wilson Siding lies at the intersection of Highway 4 and Highway 845. Highway 4 reaches Lethbridge and curves due west across the CPR tracks becoming 24 Avenue South.

In Lethbridge, the highway turns north onto 43 Street as a major arterial road with a speed limit of 70 km/h (43 mph). It intersects the major east–west arterial routes of 20 Avenue and South Parkside Drive in south Lethbridge before crossing the Canadian Pacific Railway tracks a final time, then ends at an intersection with Crowsnest Trail. With only four traffic lights, it provides an alternative to the busy Mayor Magrath Drive, the main north–south route in Lethbridge, which has a dozen sets of lights over the same distance. The section of 43 Street near 6 Avenue South is the busiest part of Highway 4, carrying over 19,000 vehicles per day in 2017. Between Lethbridge and Wilson Siding, traffic quickly decreases to less than 10,000 vehicles per day, and less than 5,000 vehicles per day for the remaining 86 km (53 mi) until Coutts.

== History ==
=== Sunshine Trail ===
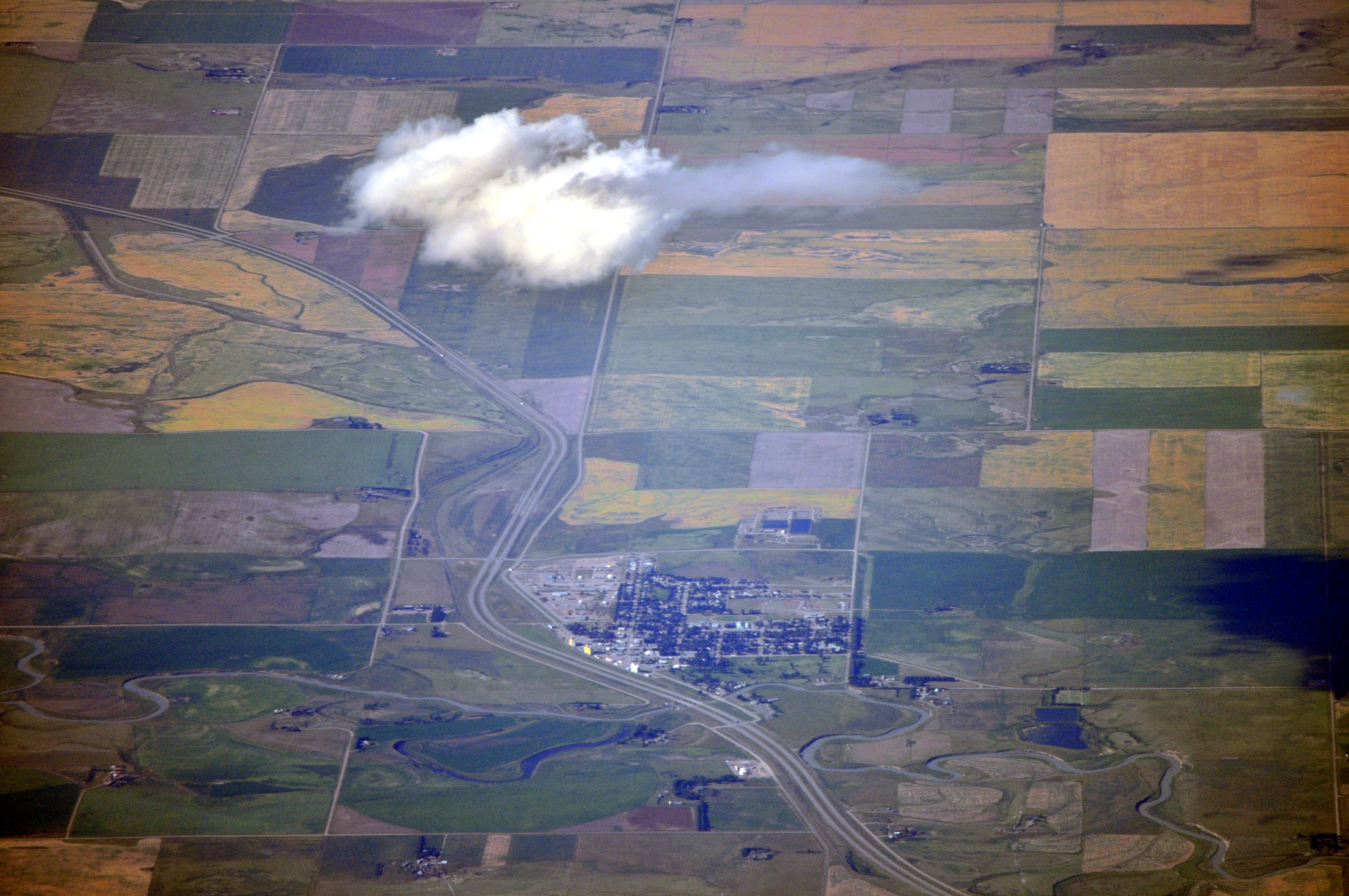
A Highway 4 bypass of the town of Milk River was completed in 2009, the final section of the highway to become divided

Like many other main highways in southern Alberta, the alignment of Highway 4 is based on an existing railway. In the late 1890s, a railway was constructed between Lethbridge and Coutts by the Alberta Railway and Coal Company, who then extended the route to Great Falls, Montana. A spur to the southwest from Stirling to Cardston was also built. A trail developed paralleling the railroad, eventually evolving by 1912 into a dirt road known as part of the Sunshine Trail. The route was identified as a key corridor connecting Alberta to major cities of the United States for the purposes of trade and tourist travel. Lethbridge mayor W. D. L. Hardie supported proposals for the road to be gravelled, claiming it would be a relatively easy and affordable process and could set precedent for other gravelling projects in the province. In tandem with the Red Trail (now Highway 3) and Highway 1 (now Highway 2), Highway 4 comprised the north portion of the all-weather Sunshine Trail that would eventually run from Los Angeles to Peace River.

The alignment of the highway has changed slightly from its inception to the present day. From its northern end in Lethbridge, it originally followed the railway line on a southeasterly heading before turning due east along Township Road 54 at New Dayton. It then followed present-day Highway 36 south through Warner, before turning back east toward the railway north of Milk River, before following it through the town and into Coutts. In 1938, Lethbridge City council lobbied to the provincial government for the entire route to paved. Along with other Lethbridge officials, they hoped the highway would be given priority over other projects in the area as the Coutts border crossing was far and away the busiest in Alberta, carrying more traffic than all the others combined. Work began in 1945 to reconstruct and straighten out the existing alignment of the highway that consisted of the numerous aforementioned 90° turns. The first section to be reconstructed and paved was from Coutts to Craddock. Work continued on the northern half of the highway and was mostly completed by 1947, with the official opening of the new Lethbridge–Coutts highway held in May 1948 in Coutts. The road was designated as Highway 4 by the following decade.

=== Later years ===
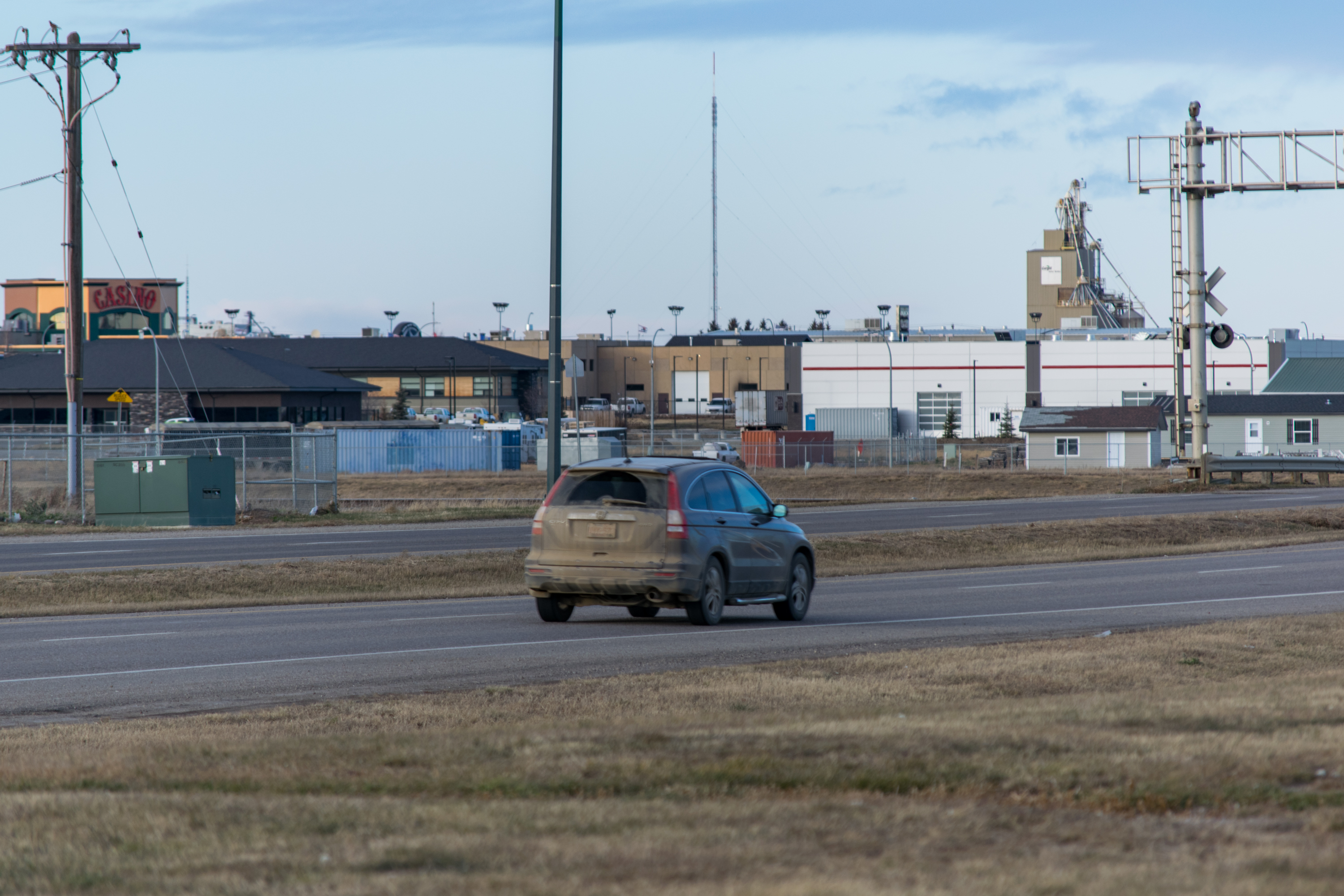
43 Street in south Lethbridge, the busiest section of Highway 4

Prior to the construction of 43 Street, the former alignment of Highway 4 in Lethbridge was along Mayor Magrath Drive, cosigned with Highway 5 to 3 Avenue in south Lethbridge, which was then Highway 3. It was later signed as 24 Avenue past Highway 5 (Mayor Magrath Drive), becoming Scenic Drive and continuing in a northwest direction to Highway 3 near downtown. In 1992, 43 Street in south Lethbridge was widened from two to four lanes, although it did not carry the Highway 4 designation at this time. Ordinarily, Alberta begins to consider upgrading to a divided highway when traffic levels reach 10,000 vehicles per day. The majority of Highway 4 remains well below this threshold, but it is a component of the CANAMEX Corridor in southern Alberta, to which Alberta had made a commitment to upgrading in the late 1980s. Plans for a divided highway were confirmed by 1989, and reiterated as a priority by annual reports published by Alberta Transportation through the 1990s. The highway was the southernmost component of what was then called the Export Highway, which also included Highways 2 and 3, which were given priority for twinning in the first half of the 1990s. In 1993, federal and provincial funding was announced for various twinning projects in Alberta, including the entirety of Highway 4.

By 1996, work had begun on a 13-kilometre (8.1 mi) section north of Coutts, and a $26 million commitment had been made by Alberta to a group of projects that included the widening of Highway 4 in Lethbridge. By 1998, a 12-kilometre (7.5 mi) section south of Lethbridge to Highway 845 had been completed. For the majority of the highway, the newly constructed lanes carried northbound traffic and the existing road was converted to carry southbound traffic. Almost all work had been completed before the end of the decade. On September 18, 1999, Highway 4 was renamed the First Special Service Force Memorial Highway. The route was travelled between 1942 and 1944 by Canadian volunteers of the force to join their American counterparts for training at Fort William Henry Harrison near Helena in preparation for World War II. Several Canadian and American members of the force that came to be known as the "Devil's Brigade" were on hand in Milk River for the dedication of plaques for the route, and signs at both ends of the highway were erected. Interstate 15 between Sweet Grass and Helena had received the same name in 1996.

The section of Highway 4 through Milk River was the last remaining section that was not a divided expressway. Work had been delayed by land acquisition and some uncertainty on the final routing. A bypass east of the town and upgrades to the existing route through the community had been considered, but ultimately a new twinned highway west of the town, and a relocation of the railway, was chosen. The $59 million project included the construction of two bridges over Milk River and was completed in 2009.

=== 2022 border blockade ===
On January 29, 2022, a demonstration against COVID-19 vaccine mandates for cross-border truckers began blocking Highway 4 near Coutts. The protest was held in solidarity with a separate trucker convoy protest then underway in Ottawa. The RCMP issued a travel advisory for the highway between south of Lethbridge and the border, and access to the border crossing and the village of Coutts was blocked for periods over the following days. Alberta Premier Jason Kenney and NDP leader Rachel Notley both called for the blockade to end.

Traffic to the border was blocked again in early February after the province announced it would lift its COVID-19 public health restrictions, and the RCMP later laid charges against several individuals for offences including dangerous driving in connection with incidents at the blockade. The blockade ended on February 15, 2022, after the RCMP arrested 13 people and seized a cache of firearms and ammunition near the protest site. A criminal trial related to the blockade was still before the courts as of 2025.

== Future ==
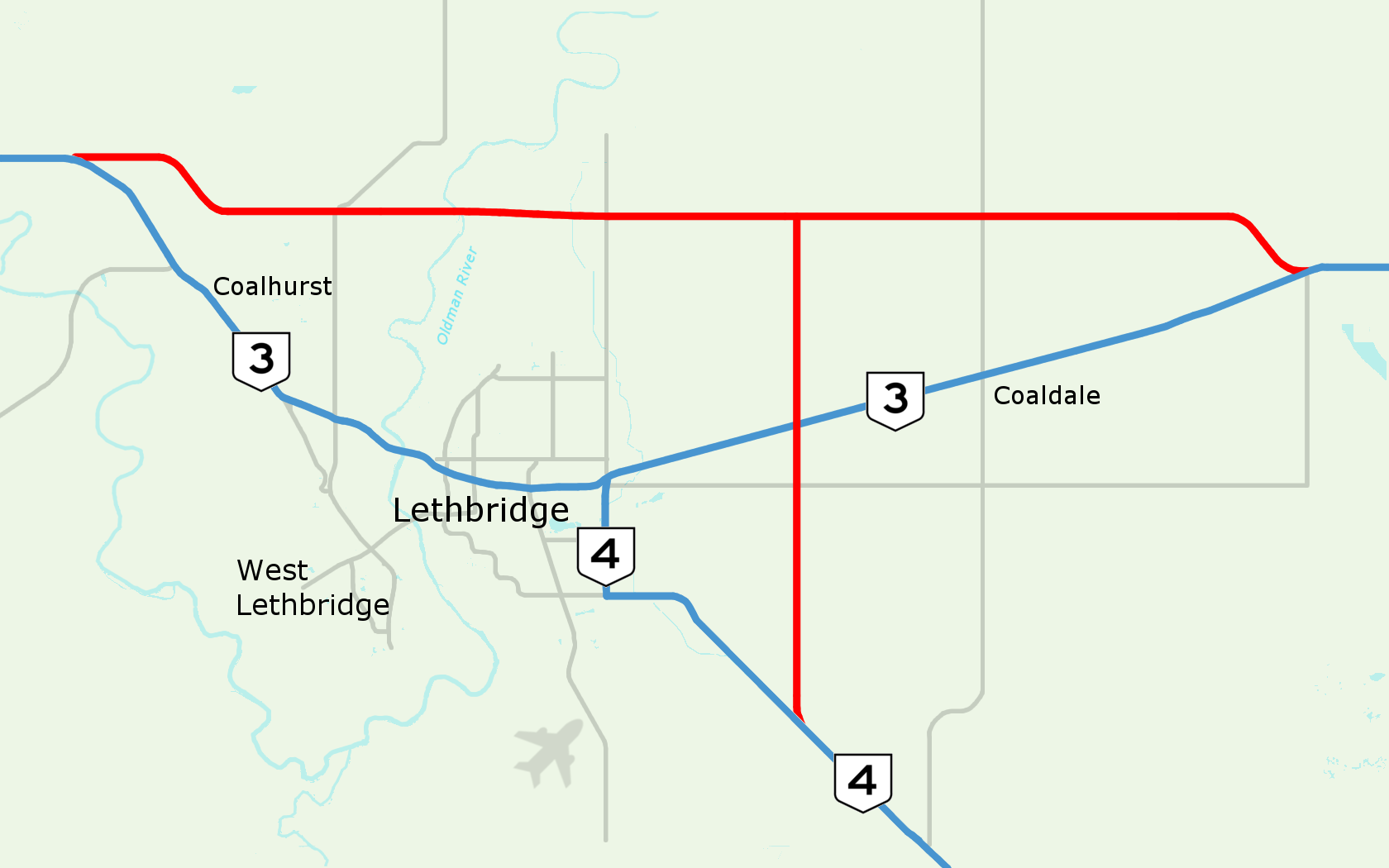
Proposed freeway bypasses of Lethbridge, Coaldale, and Coalhurst highlighted in red

Alberta Transportation has proposed the construction of a freeway bypass of Lethbridge, tentatively called Highway 4X. In combination with proposed bypasses of Fort Macleod, Claresholm and Nanton, the project would eliminate all traffic lights on the CANAMEX Corridor in southern Alberta. In a study completed by Stantec, the recommended alignment of the route would split from the existing Highway 4 southeast of Lethbridge between Range Roads 210 and 205, approximately equidistant between Lethbridge and Wilson Siding. The divided highway would proceed due north, crossing Highway 3 between Lethbridge and Coaldale to a second new highway north of the city serving as a realigned Lethbridge bypass of Highway 3 between Township Roads 94 and 100. The alternative to a bypass project would be a significant upgrading of Crowsnest Trail to a freeway standard through Lethbridge. This upgrade would potentially require relocation of the adjacent CPR railway line, and significant demolition of adjacent properties. During the study, the city of Lethbridge indicated that this disruptive alignment would be rejected, hence the need for a bypass outside of city limits to the east and north. In 2005, the entire project was estimated to cost $546 million, equivalent to $800 million in 2025.

== Major intersections ==
Rural/specialized municipality	Location	km	mi	Destinations	Notes
County of Warner No. 5	Coutts	0.0	0.0	I-15 south – Great Falls	Continuation into Montana
County of Warner No. 5	Coutts	0.0	0.0	Canada–United States border at Sweetgrass–Coutts Border Crossing	
County of Warner No. 5	Coutts	1.3	0.81	Highway 500 east	
County of Warner No. 5		16.1	10.0	Highway 501 west – Del Bonita	South end of Highway 501 concurrency
County of Warner No. 5	Milk River	19.2	11.9	Highway 501 east (South Milk River access) – Writing-on-Stone Provincial Park	North end of Highway 501 concurrency; former Highway 4 alignment
County of Warner No. 5	Milk River	21.5	13.4	North Milk River access	Former Highway 4 alignment
County of Warner No. 5	Warner	37.8	23.5	Highway 36 north to Highway 504 east – Taber, Brooks	
County of Warner No. 5		46.2	28.7	Highway 506 west	
County of Warner No. 5		65.8	40.9	Highway 52 west – Raymond, Magrath	
County of Warner No. 5	Stirling	74.2	46.1	Highway 61 east (Red Coat Trail) – Foremost; Highway 846 south – Stirling	South end of Red Coat Trail concurrency
Lethbridge County		86.4	53.7	Highway 845 – Raymond, Coaldale	
Lethbridge County		88.8	55.2	Highway 508 west – Lethbridge Airport	
City of Lethbridge		99.5	61.8	24 Avenue S (Highway 5 south) – Lethbridge Airport, Cardston, Waterton Park	North end of Red Coat Trail concurrency; Highway 4 follows 43 Street
City of Lethbridge		102.7	63.8	1 Avenue S (Highway 512 east)	
City of Lethbridge		103.4	64.2	Crowsnest Trail (Highway 3) to Highway 2 – Fort Macleod, Calgary, Coaldale, Taber, Medicine Hat 43 Street to Highway 843 north	CANAMEX Corridor follow Highway 3 west; 43 Street continues north
1.000 mi = 1.609 km; 1.000 km = 0.621 mi: Concurrency terminus; Route transition

== See also ==
- Pan-American Highway
- Transportation in Lethbridge
