= Interstate 15 =

Interstate in the Western United States

Interstate 15
- I-15 highlighted in red

Route information
- Length: 1,433.52 mi (2,307.03 km)
- Existed: August 14, 1957–present
- NHS: Entire route

Major junctions
- South end: I-8 / SR 15 in San Diego, CA
- I-10 in Ontario, CA; I-40 in Barstow, CA; I-11 / US 93 / US 95 in Las Vegas, NV; I-70 near Cove Fort, UT; I-80 in Salt Lake City, UT; I-84 from Riverdale, UT to Tremonton, UT; I-86 in Chubbuck, ID; I-90 near Butte, MT
- North end: Highway 4 at the Canadian border in Sweet Grass, MT

Location
- Country: United States
- States: California, Nevada, Arizona, Utah, Idaho, Montana

Highway system
- Interstate Highway System; Main; Auxiliary; Suffixed; Business; Future

Interstate 15 (I-15) is a major Interstate Highway in the Western United States, running through Southern California and the Intermountain West. I-15 begins near the Mexican border in San Diego County and stretches 1,433 miles (2,306 km) north to Alberta, Canada, passing through the states of California, Nevada, Arizona, Utah, Idaho, and Montana. The Interstate serves the cities of San Diego and San Bernardino in California; Las Vegas, Nevada; Salt Lake City, Utah; Idaho Falls, Idaho; and Great Falls, Montana. It also passes close to the urban areas of Los Angeles, Orange, and Riverside counties in California. The stretches of I-15 in Idaho, Utah, and Arizona have been designated as the "Veterans Memorial Highway". The southern end is at a junction with I-8 and State Route 15 (SR 15) in San Diego, and the northern end is at a connection with Alberta Highway 4 at the Sweetgrass–Coutts Border Crossing, at the Canada–United States border.

I-15 was built to connect the Inland Empire with San Diego in California, facilitate tourism access to Las Vegas, provide access to the Arizona Strip, interconnect all of the metropolitan statistical areas in Utah except for Logan, and provide freeway bypasses for Pocatello, Idaho Falls, and Great Falls. Since its creation, I-15 has served as a long-haul route for North American commerce. It is now officially chartered for this purpose: from the junction of I-11 in Las Vegas to the Canadian border, I-15 forms part of the CANAMEX Corridor, a High Priority Corridor, as a result of the North American Free Trade Agreement. Since the construction of I-15, California, Idaho, Nevada, and Utah have consistently ranked in the fastest-growing areas of the United States. As a result, the route of I-15 has substantially increased in population and commuter traffic.

== Route description ==
Lengths
	mi	km
CA	287.26	462.30
NV	123.77	199.19
AZ	29.39	47.30
UT	401.07	645.46
ID	196.00	315.43
MT	396.03	637.35
Total	1,433.52	2,307.03

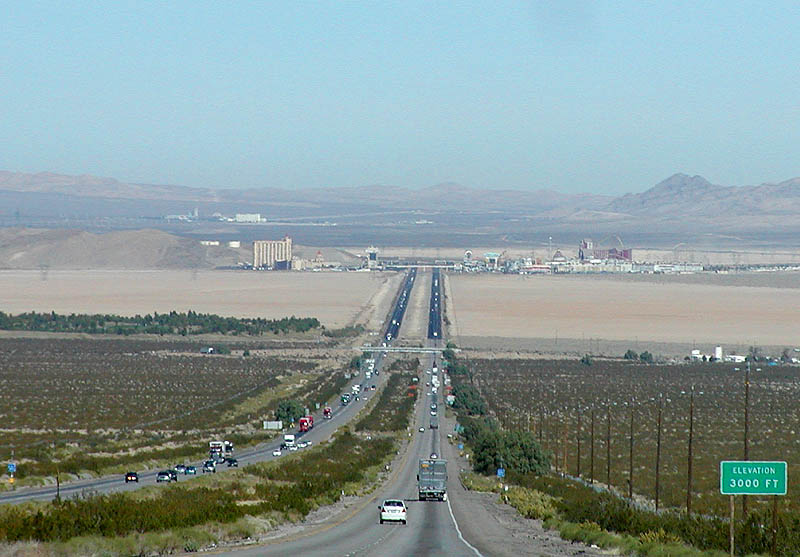
Northbound I-15 makes a steep descent from the Mountain Pass into the Ivanpah Valley

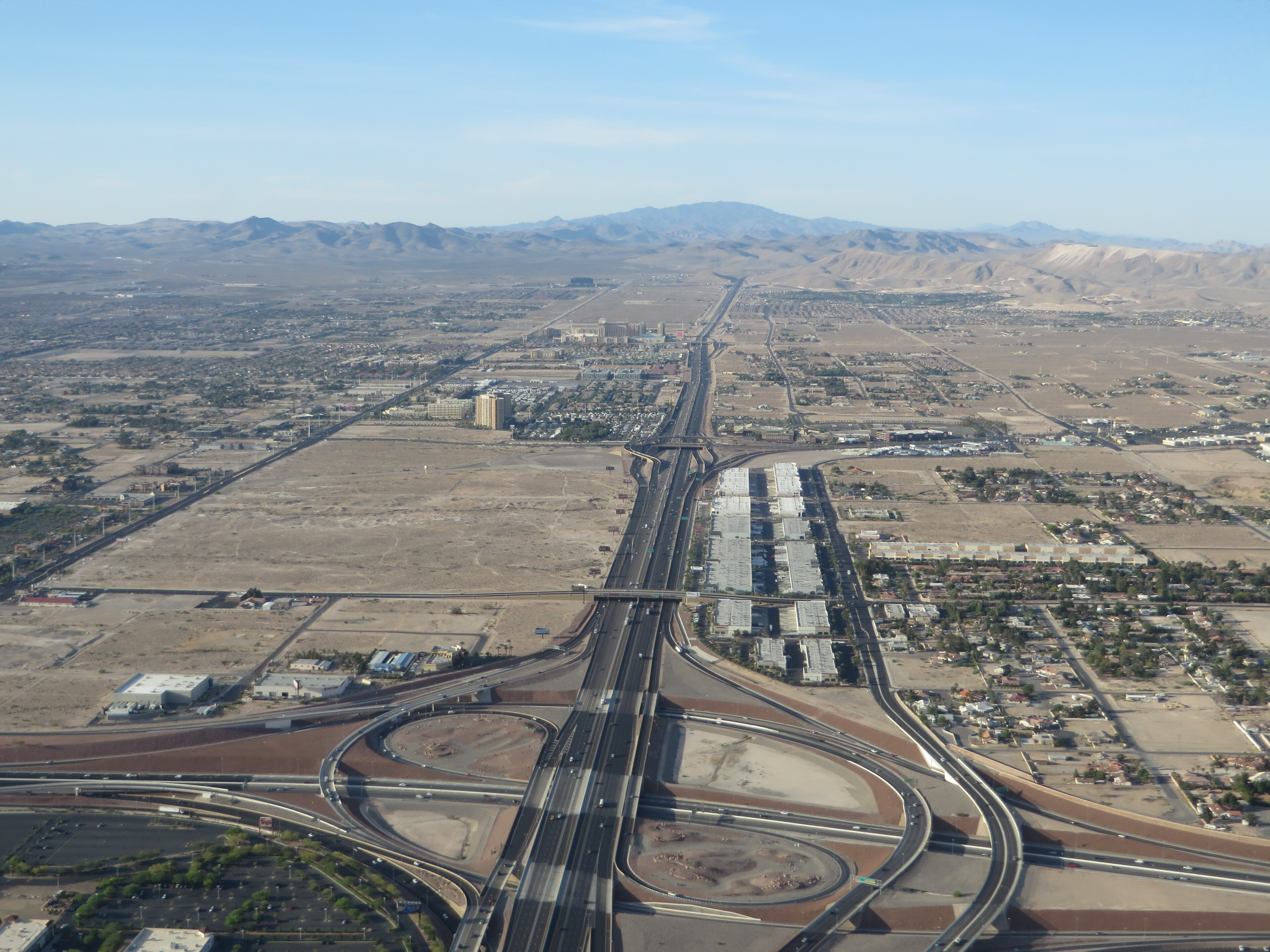
Aerial view of I-15 looking south from Sunset Road in the Las Vegas Valley

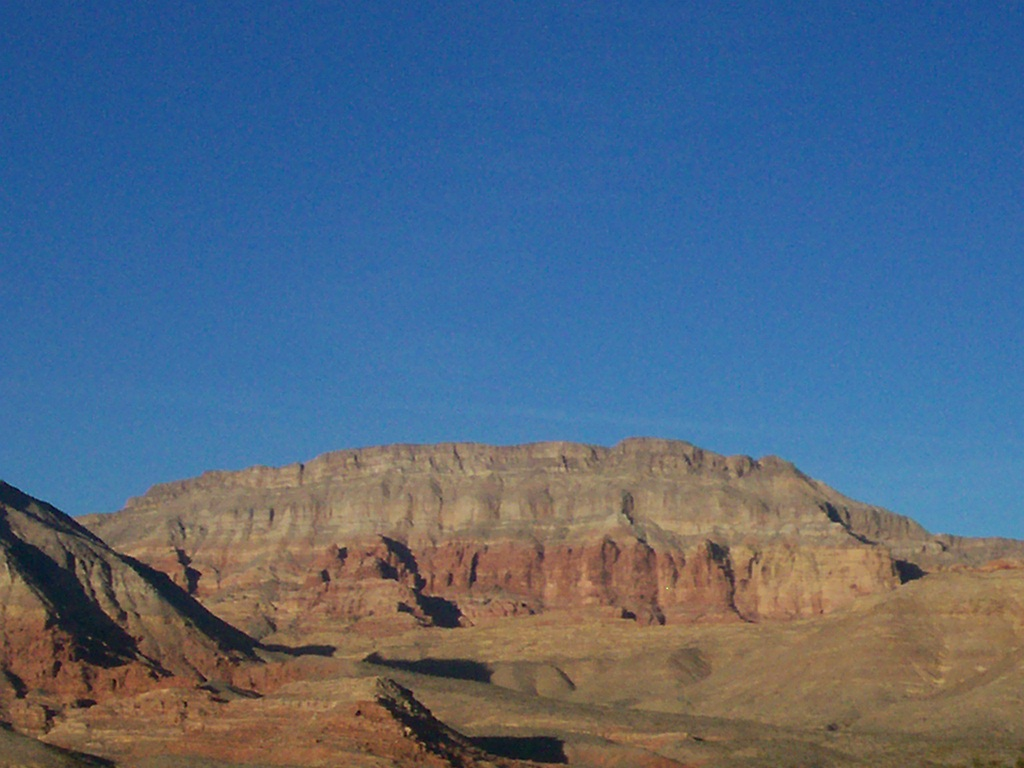
I-15 passes through the Virgin River Gorge, Arizona, revealing scenic reddish brown cliffs

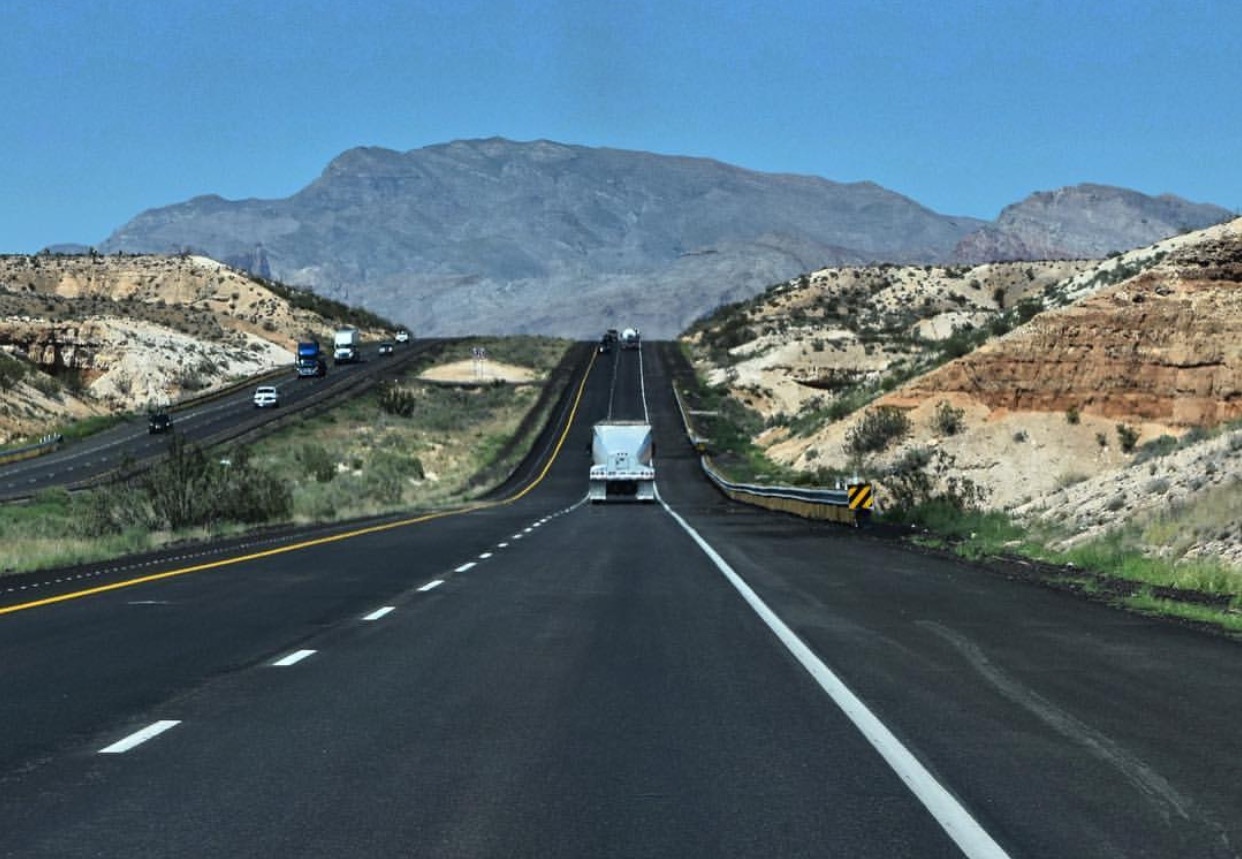
I-15 in Arizona

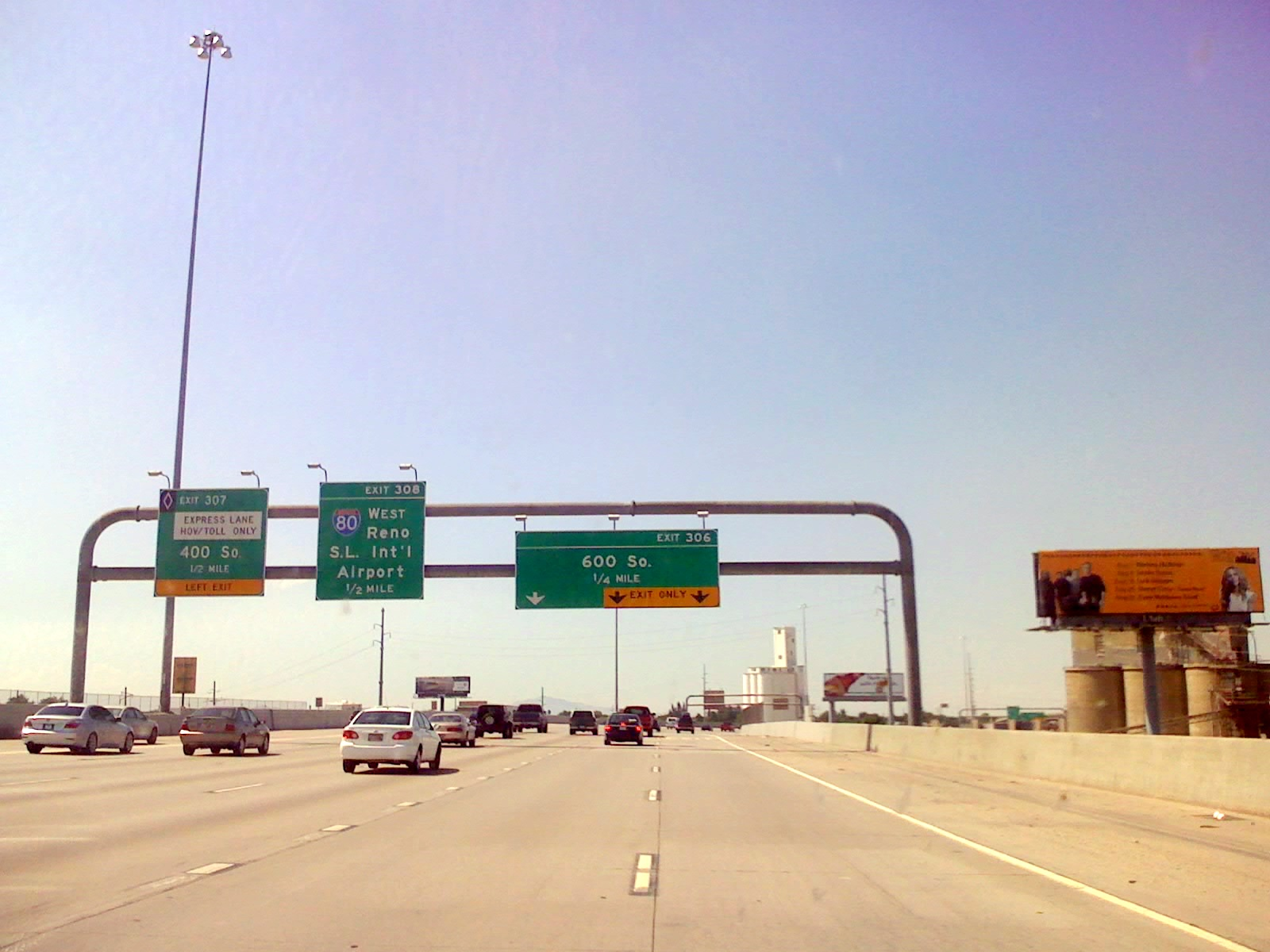
I-15 in Salt Lake City

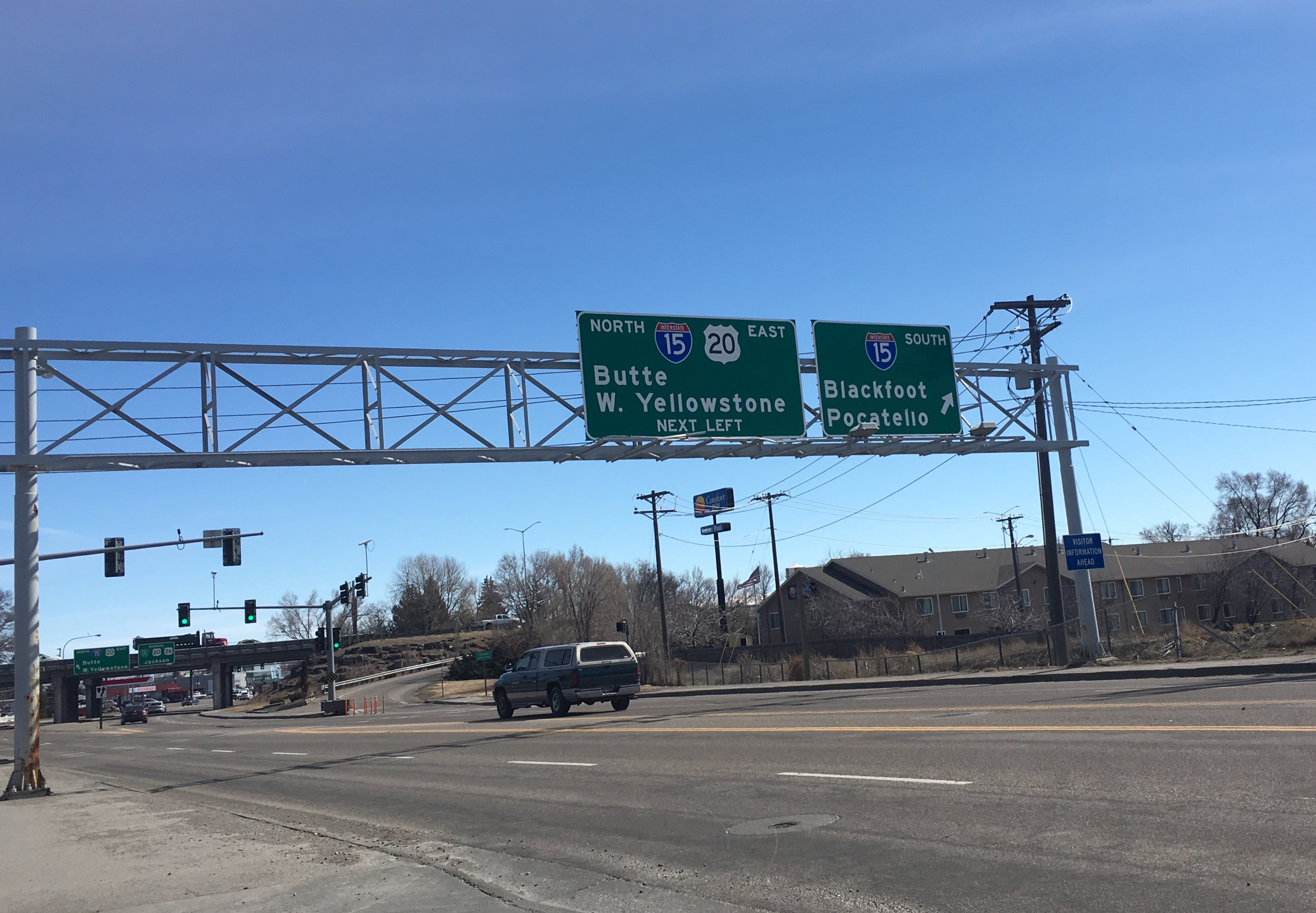
I-15/US 20 Jct. in Idaho Falls, Idaho

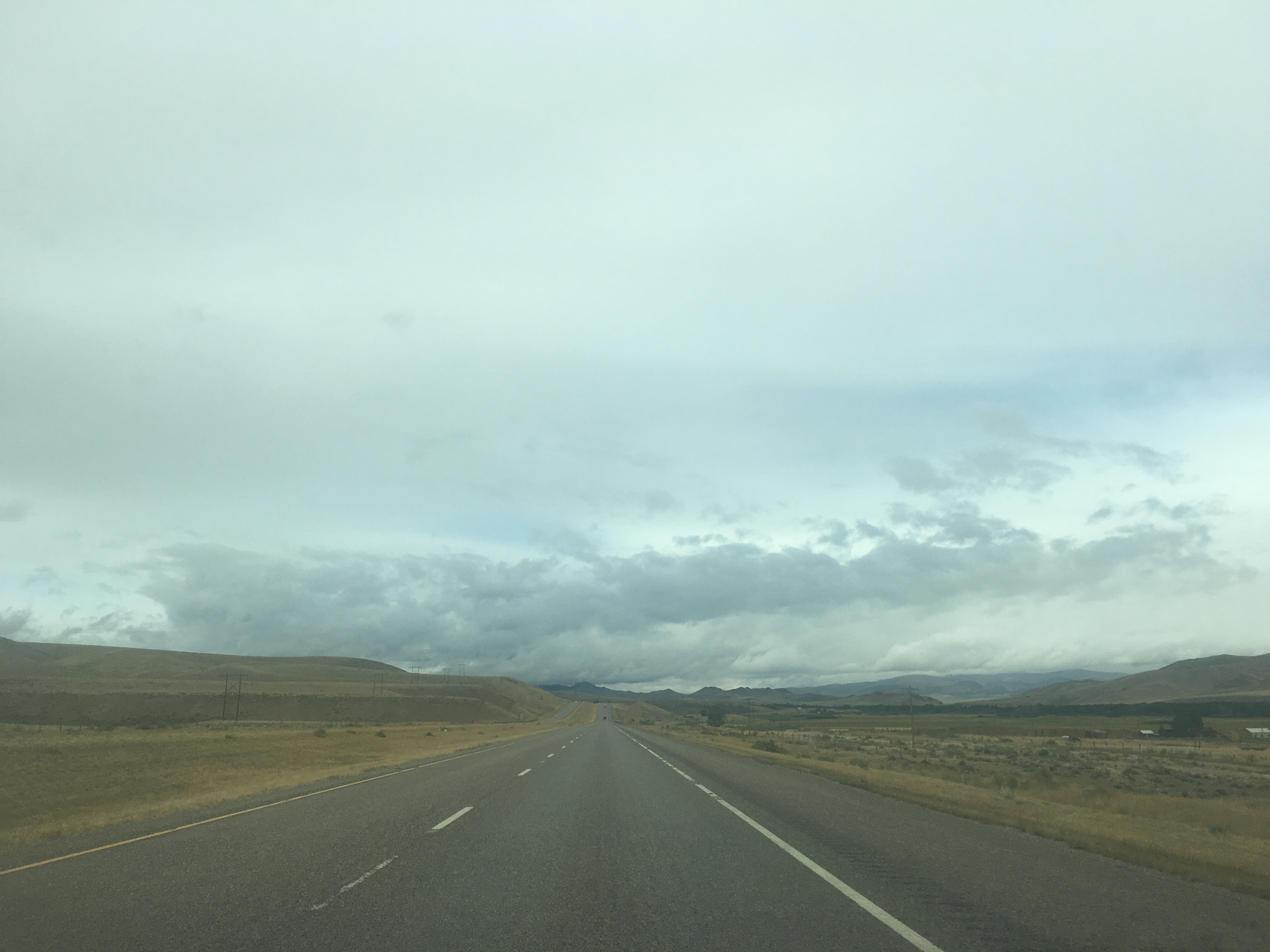
I-15, 20 miles (32 km) south of Dillon, Montana

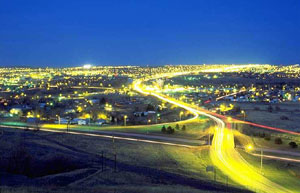
I-15 (foreground left to right) goes through Great Falls, Montana

This highway's southern terminus is in San Diego, California, at I-8, although via SR 15, a southern extension of the freeway, the route connects to I-5 12.5 miles from the US/Mexico border in southern San Diego. The northern terminus is in Sweet Grass, Montana, at the Canada–US border, where it becomes Alberta Highway 4. It is 1,433 miles (2,306 km) long from San Diego to Sweet Grass.

=== California ===
North of its junction with SR 91 in Corona, the route roughly follows the former routes of State Route 31. North of Devore, the highway follows the approximate alignment of historic US Route 66 along with US 91 and US 395. US 395 breaks away at Hesperia and the route continues on a direct path to Barstow 35 miles (56 km) to the north. Meanwhile, the old alignments of US 91 and US 66 follow the Mojave River from Victorville to Barstow along the National Trails Highway. At that point, I-15 follows the old route of US 91 exclusively as US 66 turned east toward Needles. For many parts of the highway, high-voltage powerlines, such as Path 46 and Path 27, almost all originating from the Hoover Dam, follow the freeway. Many of these link distant power stations to the Los Angeles metropolitan area.

The southern starting point of I-15 was in 1957 planned to be in San Bernardino, at the interchange with the San Bernardino Freeway (then US 70/US 99, now I-10). This was logical as I-15 was following the old alignment of the historic Route 66 which passed through San Bernardino. The segment was completed accordingly.

In 1964, legislation was later passed to extend the Interstate to San Diego. Instead of extending the existing freeway from the I-10 interchange south, however, the California Department of Transportation drew a new segment in Devore that "branched" off of the original alignment and bypassed San Bernardino altogether. This segment's alignment is generally northeast to southwest for about 13 miles (21 km). Then, in Rancho Cucamonga, its directional alignment shifts to north–south where it eventually meets with I-10 (about 15 miles (24 km) west of the original interchange in San Bernardino). The segment that had been built from Devore to San Bernardino was retained as an Interstate, but was renumbered as I-215. Note that during the construction of I-15's present alignment, and for some time afterward, I-215 was numbered as I-15E, and its actual mileage would begin at I-10. I-15 runs for a total of 287 miles (462 km) in California.

=== Nevada ===
I-15 begins in Primm and continues through Las Vegas along the Las Vegas Strip corridor. Then, the Interstate crosses the border with Arizona in Mesquite. The Interstate in Nevada runs entirely in Clark County, for a distance of 123.8 miles (199 km).

=== Arizona ===
I-15 passes through the northwestern corner of Arizona with a total length of 29.4 miles (47 km). The stretch is separated from the rest of the state and has one major exit, at Beaver Dam/Littlefield, Arizona. It includes a spectacular section where the road twists between the narrow walls of the Virgin River Gorge.

=== Utah ===
I-15 continues through Utah for 401 miles (645 km). It is the main north–south connection for the state. The highway approximately follows the old alignment of US 91 from St. George to Brigham City. The highway passes through the fast-growing Utah's Dixie region in the southwestern part of the state, which includes St. George, Cedar City, and eventually most of the major cities and suburbs along the Wasatch Front, including Provo, Orem, Sandy, Salt Lake City, Layton, and Ogden. Near Cove Fort, I-70 begins its journey eastward across the country. The Interstate merges with I-80 for about three miles (4.8 km) from South Salt Lake to just west of Downtown Salt Lake City and also merges with I-84 from Ogden to Tremonton. Along nearly its entire length through the state, I-15 winds its way along the western edge of a nearly continuous range of mountains (the Wasatch Range in the northern half of the state). The only exceptions are north of Cove Fort and when it passes between Cedar City and St. George, known as the Black Ridge, a transition zone of drastic change in elevation and climate, an area where the eastern Great Basin, Colorado Plateau, and Mojave Desert converge.

=== Idaho ===
I-15 passes through Idaho for 196 miles (315 km). I-15 crosses the Utah state line in Oneida County. The highway runs through Pocatello, Blackfoot, and Idaho Falls, intersecting with I-86. The last county in Idaho that I-15 passes through is Clark County. Finally, the Interstate reaches the Montana state line at Monida Pass.

=== Montana ===
I-15 continues onward through 396 miles (637 km) of Montana through the cities of Butte, Helena, Great Falls, and Shelby, intersecting with I-90, I-115, and I-315. At Sweet Grass, I-15 terminates upon crossing the Canadian border into the province of Alberta; however, I-15 signage is present on Alberta Highway 4 southbound from Lethbridge to the Canadian border.

== History ==
I-15 was constructed along the route of US 91. Once I-15 was relatively intact, US 91 was decommissioned, except for one part in Northern Utah / Southern Idaho where I-15 instead followed the route of former US 191.

I-15 originally had two suffixed routes. In California, I-15 had an eastern branch bypassing San Bernardino, which was designated I-15E. I-15E was renumbered and is now I-215. Present day routing of I-15 in California was originally given "I-15W" as its title while it was under construction (the original asphalt portions from Temescal Canyon to Ontario Avenue were dubbed I-15W on maps until 1974), but was never officially signed as such. In Idaho, I-15 had a western branch near Pocatello that connected I-15 and I-84 (then I-80N). This highway was designated I-15W. It is now the western I-86.

=== Growth along route ===
Since the construction of I-15, California, Nevada, and Utah have consistently ranked in the fastest-growing areas of the United States. As a result, the route of I-15 has substantially increased in population and commuter traffic has increased the traffic burden on the freeway. Current population estimates are that more than 75 percent of the population of Utah, 19 percent of the population of California, and more than 70 percent of the population of Nevada live in counties where I-15 is the primary Interstate Highway.

Similarly, in California, I-15 is seeing more commuter traffic due to the growth of the Mojave Desert communities of Hesperia, Victorville, and Barstow. In Utah, I-15 has been under near-constant construction in the Wasatch Front, and future plans released by the Utah Department of Transportation (UDOT) indicate that this will continue in the north and the far south of the state as well, due to the extremely rapid growth of Washington County and surrounding areas. In like manner, Las Vegas in Nevada has seen growth along I-15, and in all of the states that it currently serves, it has recently been or is currently in the process of being widened. The portions in Arizona, Idaho and Montana have retained their rural, long-haul character. Although Arizona has also grown substantially since the construction of I-15, this highway serves only the isolated corner of northwestern Arizona.

Due to this rapid area growth, the I-15 corridor is the focus of several mass transit projects. The Las Vegas Monorail, FrontRunner commuter rail system, and TRAX light rail in Salt Lake City are mass transit lines loosely parallel to I-15 that are now in operation.

The Los Angeles–Las Vegas corridor has long been proposed as a high-speed maglev train route to relieve highway congestion. Proposals from as early as the 1970s were succeeded by the California–Nevada Interstate Maglev project, which was studied from 2004 to 2010 but never realized. Amtrak ran a conventional passenger rail service between the two cities, named the Desert Wind, from 1979 to 1997. The Brightline West line, a conventional high-speed rail service under a private operator, broke ground in 2024 and is scheduled to commence in 2028 with service between Rancho Cucamonga and Las Vegas. It will use the median of I-15 for most of its 218-mile (351 km) route and reach speeds of up to 186 miles per hour (299 km/h).

== Future ==
The segment signed as SR 15 from I-5 to I-8 in San Diego is planned to be redesignated as part of I-15 once this segment is completely converted to Interstate standards, namely where the freeway's interchange with SR 94 is concerned. The interchange currently has left-exits and blind merges, and is due to be updated with a widening of both SR 15 and SR 94. At that time, SR 15 is planned to be resigned as part of I-15. The remaining portion of SR 15 conforms with Interstate standards.

== Junction list ==
California
I-8 / SR 15 in San Diego
I-215 in Murrieta
I-10 in Ontario
I-215 in San Bernardino
US 395 in Hesperia
I-40 in Barstow
Nevada
I-215 in Enterprise
I-11 / US 93 / US 95 in Las Vegas. I-15/US 93 travels concurrently to northeast of North Las Vegas.
Arizona
No major junctions
Utah
I-70 south-southwest of Cove Fort
US 50 north-northeast of Holden. The highways travel concurrently to Scipio.
US 6 in Santaquin. The highways travel concurrently to Spanish Fork.
US 189 in Provo
US 89 in Lehi. The highways travel concurrently to Draper.
I-215 in Murray
I-80 in South Salt Lake. The highways travel concurrently to Salt Lake City.
US 89 in Salt Lake City
US 89 in North Salt Lake
I-215 in North Salt Lake
US 89 on the West Bountiful–Bountiful city line. The highways travel concurrently to Farmington.
I-84 in Riverdale. The highways travel concurrently to Tremonton.
US 91 on the Perry–Brigham City city line.
Idaho
US 91 north-northwest of Virginia. The highways travel concurrently to Pocatello.
US 30 northwest of McCammon. The highways travel concurrently to Pocatello.
I-86 in Chubbuck
US 91 southwest of Blackfoot
US 26 in Blackfoot. The highways travel concurrently to Idaho Falls.
US 20 in Idaho Falls. The highways travel concurrently through Idaho Falls.
Montana
I-90 in Butte. The highways travel concurrently through Butte.
I-115 in Butte
US 12 / US 287 in Helena. I-15/US 287 travels concurrently to northeast of Wolf Creek.
I-315 / US 89 in Great Falls. I-15/US 89 travels concurrently to northeast of Vaughn.
US 2 in Shelby
Highway 4 at the Sweetgrass-Coutts Border Crossing in the Canadian border east-northeast of Sweet Grass

== Auxiliary routes ==
- Inland Empire, California – I-215
- Las Vegas, Nevada – I-215, I-515 (former)
- Salt Lake City, Utah – I-215
- Butte, Montana – I-115
- Great Falls, Montana – I-315 (unsigned)

== See also ==
- U.S. Route 66
- U.S. Route 91
