= CANAMEX Corridor =

Series of transportation infrastructure linking Canada and Mexico

The CANAMEX corridor (Spanish: Corredor CANAMEX) is a series of improvements to freeways and other transportation infrastructure linking Canada to Mexico through the United States. The corridor was established under the North American Free Trade Agreement. Currently the corridor is defined by a series of highways. However, the corridor is also proposed for use by railroads and fiber optic telecommunications infrastructure.

== Origin ==
While the tri-lateral corridor was defined in NAFTA, the U.S. portion of CANAMEX Trade Corridor was outlined in 1991 in the "ISTEA" highway bill, and defined by Congress in the 1995 National Highway Systems Designation Act, Public Law 104-59, November 28, 1995.

== Route description ==
The CANAMEX corridor is defined by the numbered highway designations along its length:

Canada

- British Columbia
  - Highway 97 (Alaska Highway)
  - Highway 2 – Dawson Creek to Alberta border
- Alberta
  - Highway 43 – British Columbia border to Highway 16
  - Highway 16 – to Edmonton
  - Highway 216 through Edmonton
  - Highway 2 – Edmonton to Fort Macleod
  - Highway 201 alternate route through Calgary (Note: CANAMEX Corridor is defined by both Highway 2 (Deerfoot Trail) and Highway 201 (Stoney Trail) through Calgary.)
  - Highway 3 – Fort Macleod to Lethbridge
  - Highway 4 – Lethbridge to the Sweetgrass–Coutts Border Crossing (continues as Interstate 15)

United States

- Montana – Interstate 15
- Idaho – Interstate 15
- Utah – Interstate 15
- Arizona – Interstate 15
- Nevada
  - Interstate 15 – Arizona state line to Las Vegas
  - Interstate 11 – Las Vegas to the Arizona state line
- Arizona
  - U.S. Route 93 – Nevada state line to Wickenburg, future Interstate 11
  - U.S. Route 60 – Wickenburg to Surprise, implied unofficial route
  - Arizona State Route 303 – Surprise to Goodyear, implied unofficial route
  - Interstate 10 – Goodyear to Tucson
  - Interstate 19 – Tucson to Nogales
  - Arizona State Route 189 – Nogales to the Mexico–United States border

Mexico

- Mexico Federal Highway 15D – Heroica Nogales to Mexico City

== Highway ==
The United States portion of the highway was established as a High Priority Corridor. The treaty establishes that the CANAMEX highway will be upgraded to at least 4 lanes along its entire length. In 2008, 84% of the highway in the United States was compliant and 86% of the highway in Mexico was compliant.

When the corridor was first approved, two bottlenecks were identified with the Arizona portion of the corridor that required significant infrastructure to address. The first was the route of U.S. Route 93 across northwestern Arizona, which then included a slow route with numerous hairpin curves over the Hoover Dam. The Hoover Dam Bypass opened on October 19, 2010, resolving that issue.

The second issue was a gap near Phoenix. The official designation is Interstate 10 to U.S. Route 93 at Phoenix. However, US 93 does not enter Phoenix or connect with I-10. US 93 currently terminates at Wickenburg, northwest of Phoenix. Making the connection originally required driving U.S. Route 60, a surface street through the western suburbs of Phoenix that was not compliant with the standards established by the treaty. The chosen alternative for resolution involved creating a compliant connection between Wickenburg and Phoenix via upgrades and extensions to Arizona State Route 303. The final phase of the portion of AZ 303 necessary to fill the gap was upgraded to freeway standards in 2016. A second proposal has since been made for a freeway connection between Las Vegas and Casa Grande, Arizona, Interstate 11 that would in its course connect Wickenburg to Phoenix.

== Railroad ==
While the corridor is defined as series of highways, when proposed the corridor was envisioned as a muti-modal corridor including rail and telecommunications infrastructure. While most of the corridor is paralleled by existing rail lines, there is no existing contiguous line that follows the entire corridor and through rail traffic from Canada to Mexico would have to use alternate corridors for at least parts of the journey. The Union Pacific Railroad owns and operates a rail line following the corridor between Nogales, Sonora, Mexico, and Phoenix, Arizona, United States, acquired from the former Southern Pacific Railroad. There is no railroad directly connecting Phoenix and Las Vegas, but it is possible to route trains between those cities via Barstow, California, along tracks owned by Arizona and California Railway and BNSF Railway. The Union Pacific again owns tracks following the I-15 portion of the corridor from Las Vegas to Butte, Montana, acquired from the former Los Angeles and Salt Lake Railroad and Oregon Short Line. No line directly follows the corridor between Butte and Helena, Montana, but it is possible to route trains between those cities via a combination of BNSF Railway and Montana Rail Link lines. North of Helena, BNSF owns lines that closely follow the CANAMEX corridor, including a connection with Canadian Pacific Kansas City at Coutts, Alberta, Canada, acquired from the former Great Northern Railway.

== See also ==
- Pan-American Highway
- CanAm Highway
