= Devil's Coulee Dinosaur Heritage Museum =

Museum in Warner, Alberta, Canada

Coordinates: 49.2822°N 112.2036°W

- Location within Alberta
- Established: 1997
- Location: Warner, Alberta, Canada
- Type: Paleontology
- Website: www.devilscoulee.com

Devil's Coulee Dinosaur Heritage Museum, located in Warner, Alberta, Canada, is a key historic site in southern Alberta. In 1997, ten fossilized dinosaur eggs, believed to have come from a Hadrosaur, specifically a Hypacrosaurus were found at Devil's Coulee site. These were not the first fossils to be found in what was often called the Fossil Coulee region of the province and as a result the town of Warner established the museum to help interpret the story.

== Affiliations ==
The Museum is affiliated with: CMA, CHIN, and Virtual Museum of Canada.
