= Martin Reis =

German politician (born 1984)

Member of the Landtag of Rhineland-Palatinate
- Incumbent
- Assumed office 18 May 2026
- Preceded by: Torsten Welling
- Constituency: Mayen

Personal details
- Born: 1984 (age 41–42)
- Party: Christian Democratic Union

Martin Reis (born 1984) is a German politician serving as a member of the Landtag of Rhineland-Palatinate since 2026. He has served as chairman of the Christian Democratic Union in Mayen since 2018.
