= Sweetgrass–Coutts Border Crossing =

Border crossing between Canada and the United States

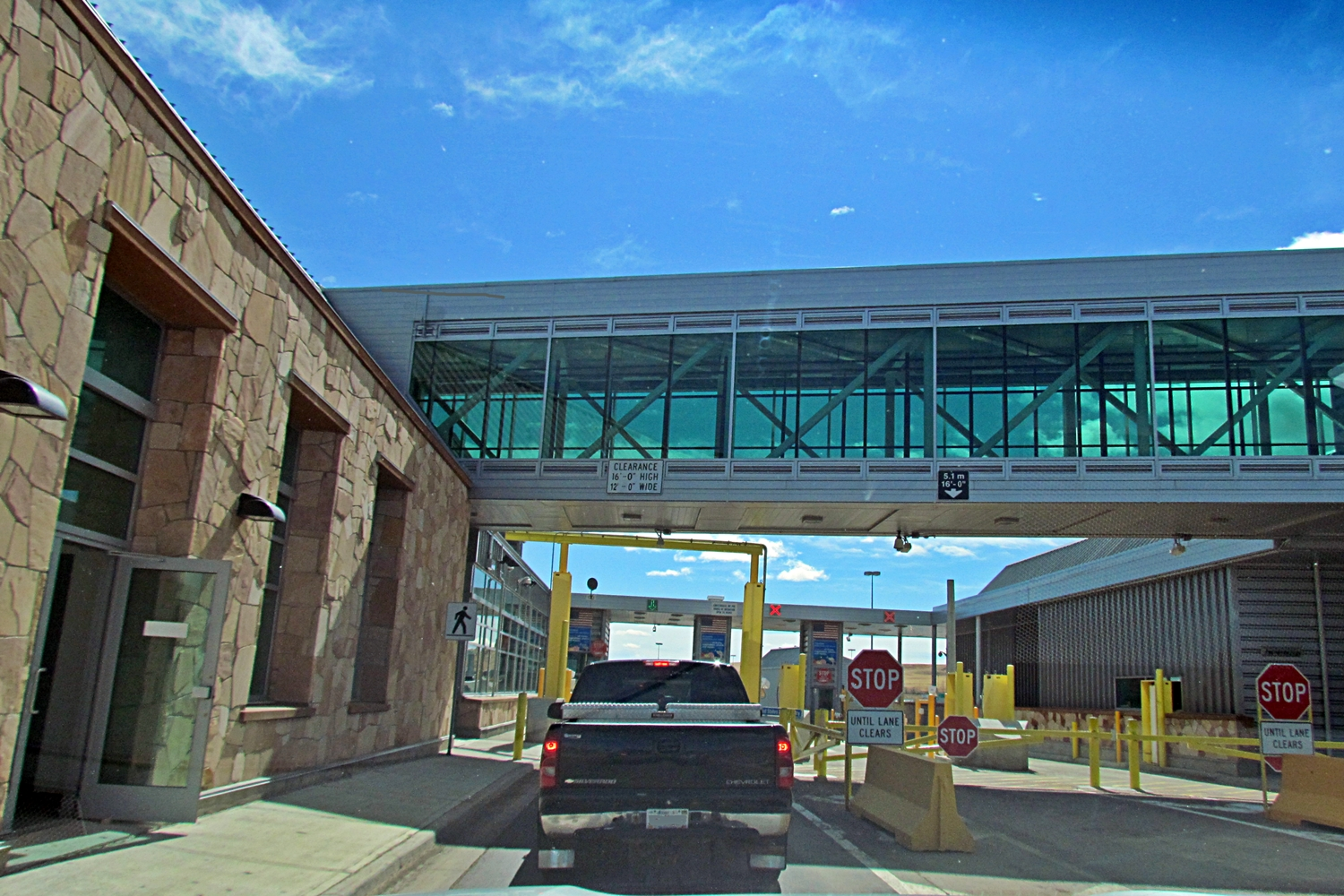
- Entering the United States at the Sweetgrass–Coutts Joint Border Inspection Station

Location
- Country: United States; Canada
- Location: I-15 / Highway 4; US Port: 39825 Interstate 15, Sweet Grass, Montana 59484; Canadian Port: Highway #4 South, Coutts, Alberta T0K 0N0
- Coordinates: 48°59′54″N 111°57′38″W

Details
- Opened: 1890

Website
- US Canadian

- US Customs Building
- U.S. National Register of Historic Places
- Location within Montana Location within the United States
- Location: I-15 just S of U.S.-Canada border, Sweetgrass, Montana
- Area: less than one acre
- Built: 1935
- Architect: Office of the Supervising Architect under Louis A. Simon
- Architectural style: Late 19th and 20th Century Revivals, Dutch Colonial Revival
- NRHP reference No.: 91000152
- Added to NRHP: February 28, 1991

The Sweetgrass–Coutts Border Crossing connects the town of Sweet Grass, Montana, with the village of Coutts, Alberta, on the Canada–United States border. I-15 on the American side joins Alberta Highway 4 on the Canadian side. Similarly, BNSF Railway and Canadian Pacific Railway (CP) connect. A primary conduit for cross border trade estimated at CA$6 billion, it is the busiest crossing for both the province of Alberta and state of Montana, and among the busiest west of the Great Lakes.

== Canadian side ==
Prior to the building of the CP across the prairies in the early 1880s, this part of Canada was accessed via the Macleod–Benton Trail from the Missouri River. The trail crossed the boundary about 11 kilometres (7 mi) west of Coutts. In 1890, the Galt group built a Coutts–Lethbridge, Alberta, narrow gauge railway. That year, a customs office opened using a room in the train station. In 1891, administrative oversight was transferred from Fort McLeod to the Port of Lethbridge. Oversight moved to the Port of Calgary in 1896, returning to Lethbridge in 1899. A combined customs office/residence building was completed in 1912. The status was upgraded to Port of Coutts in 1936. With the completion of the Calgary–Great Falls, Montana, highway in the mid-1940s, freight and passenger travel largely shifted from rail to highway. In the early 1950s, a new larger highways customs facility was built. In 2004, the US and Canada completed a CA$43 million joint border inspection station which houses the agencies of both countries.

== US side ==
In 1890, the Galt group built a Sweetgrass–Great Falls narrow gauge railway, facilitating the transport of coal from Lethbridge to Great Falls. In 1936, the US built an elaborate Georgian Revival border station, which is listed in the National Register of Historic Places. This station was replaced around 1979 with a single-story brick building when US Route 91 was replaced by I-15 a few feet to the west. This later building has since been demolished.

The United States Department of Agriculture's Food Safety and Inspection Service (FSIS) operates at this crossing, one of three main points where all meat products cross the border from Western Canada.

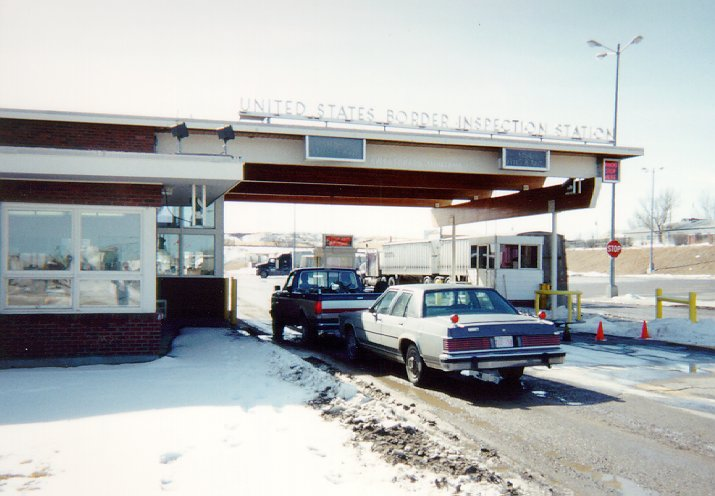
US border station, Sweetgrass, MT, 1997.

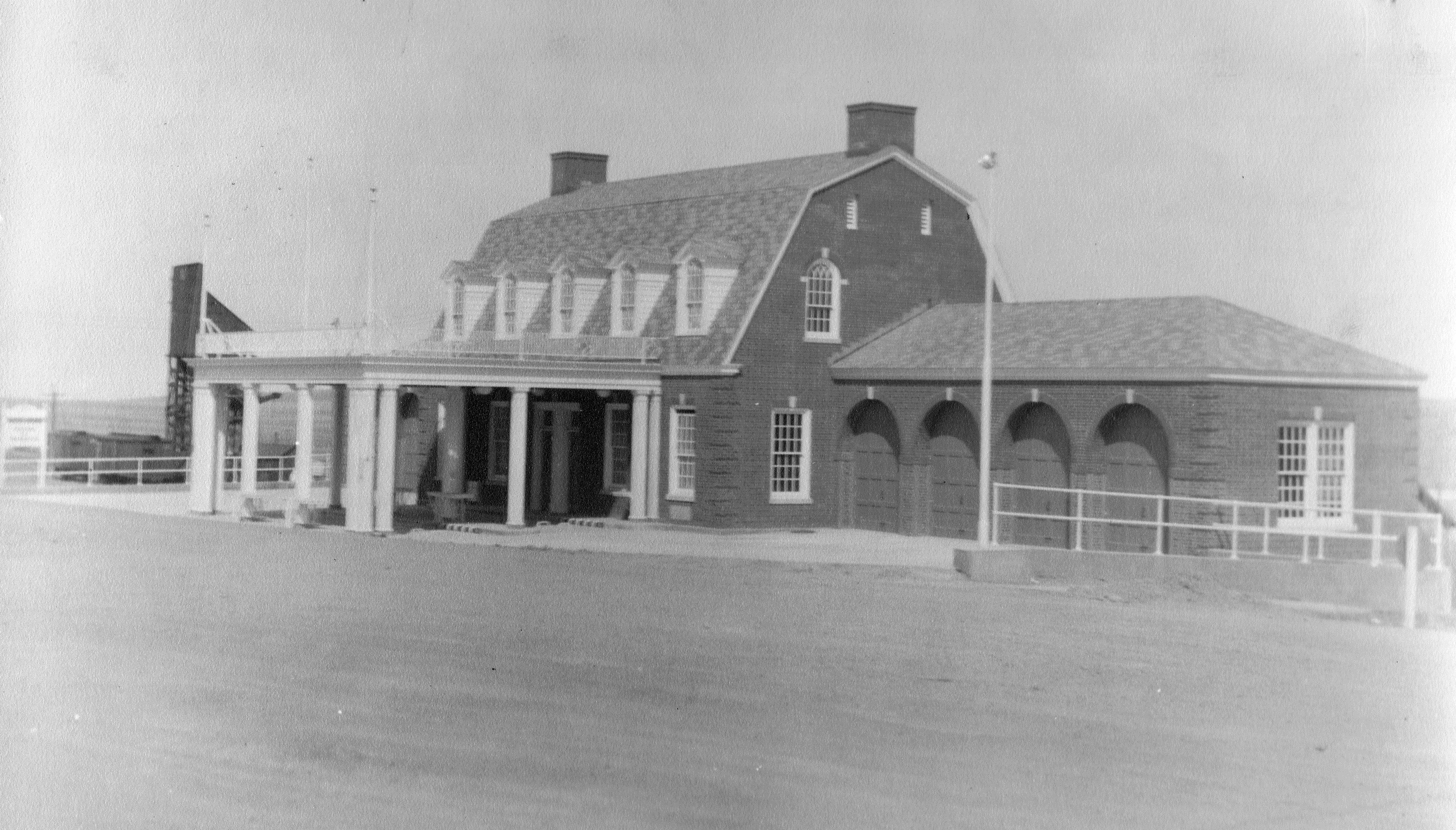
US border station, Sweetgrass MT, 1936.

== COVID-19 protocols ==
In the fall of 2020, after several months of cross border travel restrictions due to the COVID-19 pandemic, the governments of Alberta and Canada announced a pilot program. Essential workers and Canadian citizens entering Canada through this and one other crossing needed to quarantine for only 48 hours instead of the usual 14 days if a COVID test was negative.

In January 2022, protesting truck drivers "demanding an end to pandemic restrictions" created a blockade on the Canadian side of the crossing. Farmers in solidarity with the Canada convoy protest also protested against the government's COVID-19 public health measures. Protesters refused to dismantle this blockade and allegedly assaulted Royal Canadian Mounted Police (RCMP). On February 1, after the RCMP created a roadblock on Highway 4, a protester driving at high speed hit a passenger vehicle and assaulted a resident. The protester allegedly had tried to ram RCMP members, which led to the collision with a civilian vehicle.

On February 2, after five days of disruption, protesters moved vehicles to the shoulders, opening a lane in both directions. The RCMP discouraged travel to the area. That day, protesters held a meeting in the Smugglers Saloon with their lawyer Chad Williamson and rural United Conservative Party MLAs.

== See also ==
- List of Canada–United States border crossings
