= Torsten Welling =

German politician (born 1985)

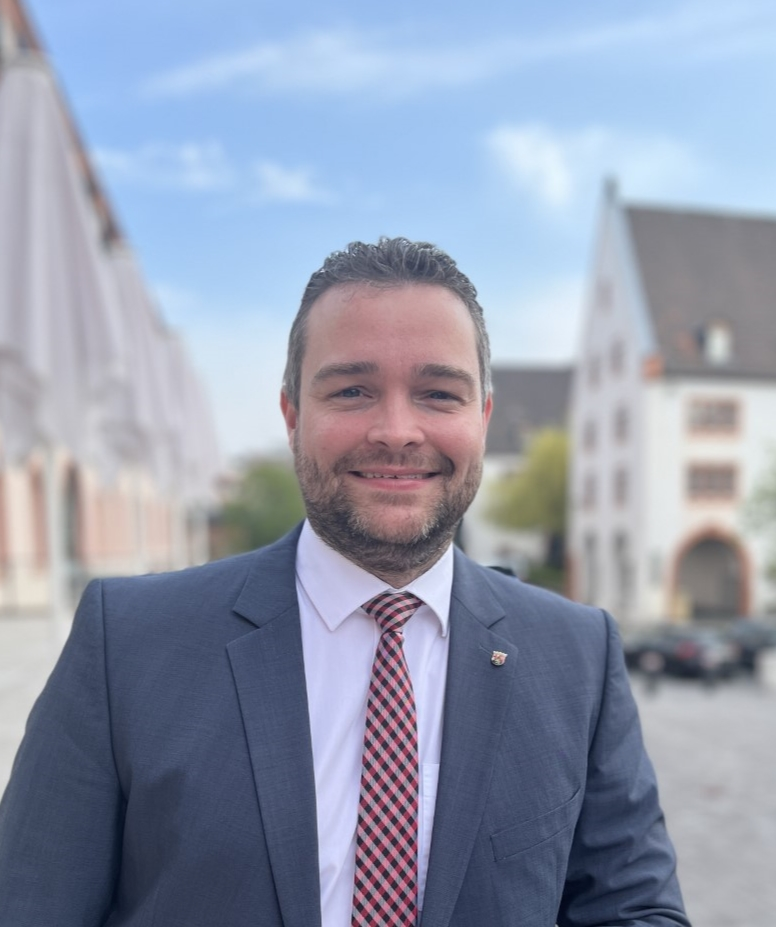
- Welling in 2022

Member of the Landtag of Rhineland-Palatinate
- In office 18 May 2021 – 18 May 2026
- Preceded by: Adolf Weiland
- Succeeded by: Martin Reis
- Constituency: Mayen

Personal details
- Born: 13 February 1985 (age 41)
- Party: Christian Democratic Union

Torsten Welling (born 13 February 1985) is a German politician serving as state secretary for federal and European affairs, sports, volunteering and media of Rhineland-Palatinate since 2026. From 2021 to 2026, he was a member of the Landtag of Rhineland-Palatinate.
