= Warner elevator row =

Grain elevators in Alberta, Canada

- Interactive map of the Warner elevator row area

General information
- Location: Warner, Alberta, Canada
- Coordinates: 49.286987°N 112.206182°W
- Construction started: 1913–1960s
- Completed: 1960s
- Demolished: X. C. Hadford Company (1950–2001); Ogilvie Flour Mills (1929–2000); Ellison Milling & Flour Co. (1939–2000); Alberta Farmers' Co-operative Elevator Company (1913-2014); Alberta Wheat Pool (1951-2014); Alberta Pool elevator (1928-2014)
- Client: Current owner(s); Viterra

Technical details
- Structural system: Wood-crib

Design and construction
- Architects: Companies (builders); United Grain Growers; X.C. Hadford Company; Alberta Farmers Co-operative Elevator Co. Alberta Pacific Grain Co. Federal Grain LTD. Ogilvie Flour Mills; Ellison Milling & Flour Co.

The Warner elevator row is a group of four historic wood-cribbed grain elevators standing in a row from south to north alongside the Canadian Pacific Railway line from Great Falls, Montana to Lethbridge, Alberta at the east entrance of the village of Warner, Alberta, Canada. At one time, the row had at least seven elevators.

== History and significance ==
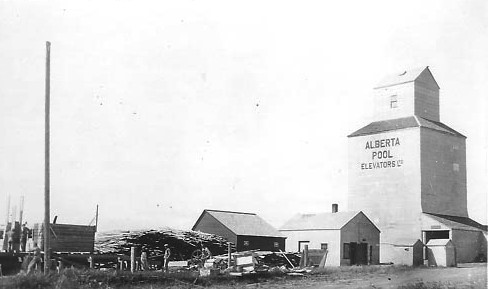
Alberta Farmers Co-operative elevator, built in 1913 before Alberta Wheat Pool takeover (photo circa 1920)

Many once-common wood-crib grain elevators in Western Canada have been torn down. Warner has four elevators, and the Inglis elevator row in Manitoba has five. Warner's elevators are not protected. In 2014, two of the elevators were demolished.

Before 1911, Warner had two elevators: one a 30,000 imperial bushels (1,100 m^{3}) house built by the Alberta Pacific Elevator Company, and the other a 25,000 imperial bushels (910 m^{3}) elevator built by Jones and Dill. In 1913, the first elevator in the remaining group was built by the Alberta Farmers' Co-operative Elevator Company. The structure and history of each elevator was influenced by developments in the grain industry and its companies from before World War II to the 1980s.

The Warner elevators date from 1913 to 1960. The row included an early example of the Alberta Farmers' Co-operative Elevator Company design and examples of complex component arrangements: elevator and twin, elevator and annexes and original and replacement offices. The 1939 elevator built by the Ellison Milling and Elevator Company is an architecturally-significant example of an essentially-unchanged 1940s complex consisting of an elevator, two balloon annexes and a track-side office and warehouse (usually from an earlier period). A small number of late-1930s elevators remain in Alberta, a reminder that few were built for some time after 1934. This elevator was demolished in the early 2000s. The Warner elevator row is included in Jim Pearson's book, Grain Elevators of Eastern Saskatchewan.

== Grain elevators ==
With the exception of the United Grain Growers elevator, Warner's elevators were little-modified and several have small scales and air dumps on site. The first elevator was built in 1911, when the Canadian Pacific Railway reached Warner.

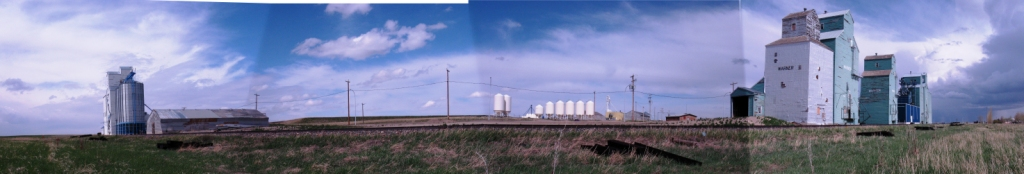
2009 panorama of the row, with six elevators standing

=== Demolitions ===
From 1999 to 2014, 5 elevators were demolished, bringing the total elevator count down to 4.

=== History ===
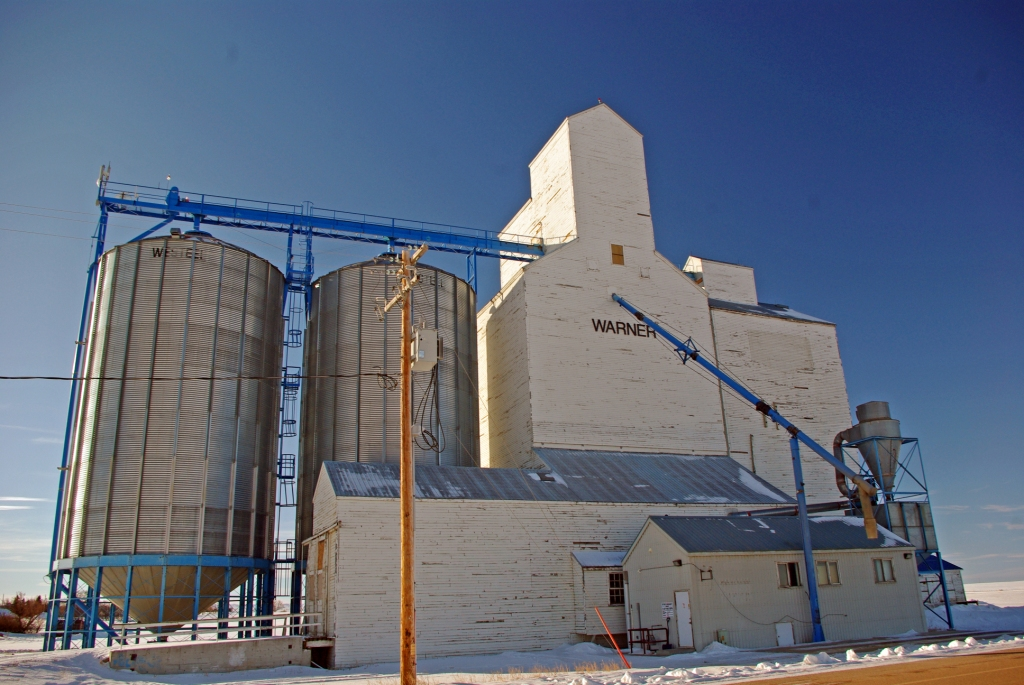
134,000-imperial-bushel (4,900 m^{3}) United Grain Growers elevator, built in 1960

The United Grain Growers elevator and annex were built between 1957 and 1960, and the complex was licensed for 134,000 imperial bushels (4,900 m^{3}) in 1960. It was UGG's second elevator at Warner; the first was sold to Alberta Pool Elevators in 1928. The elevator was upgraded during the late 1980s, including the installation of a new leg which required raising part of the cupola; the metal bin annexes on the south side and drag auger date from that time. A cyclone dust collector and truck-loading spout have been installed, and a roofed track-side warehouse on the north side was probably built at the same time as the elevator.

A demolished 1950 elevator built by X. C. Hadford Company was licensed as a 15,000-imperial-bushel (550 m^{3}) seed elevator in 1952. In 1992, it was licensed as a 240-tonne primary elevator.

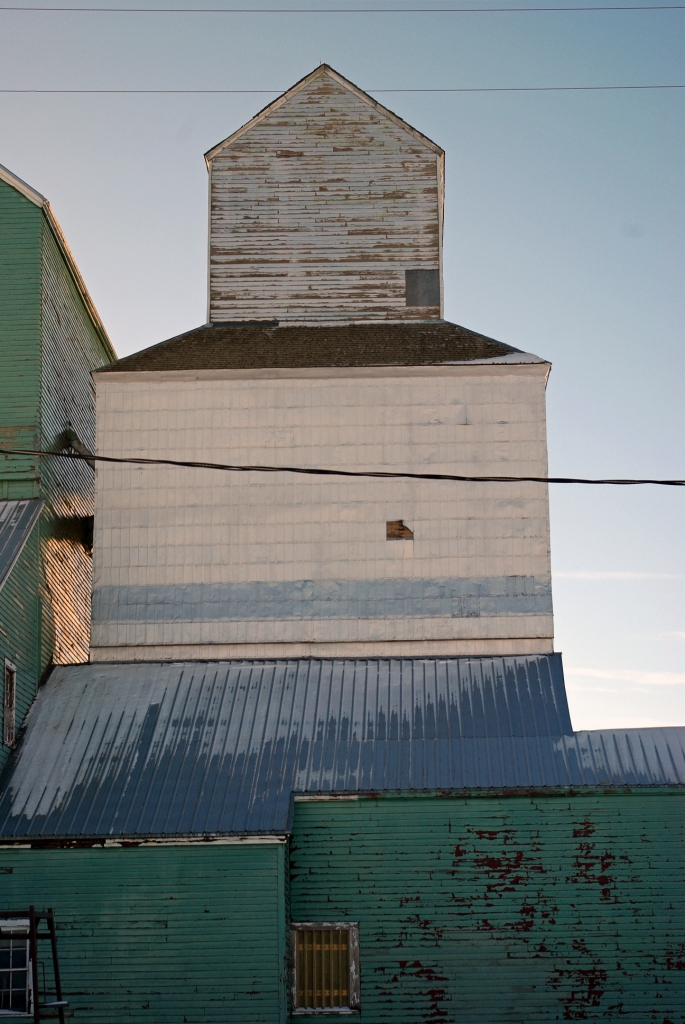
1913 Alberta Farmers Co-operative elevator in early 2010

The 35,000-imperial-bushel (1,300 m^{3}), 31 × 42 × 65 feet (9.4 × 12.8 × 19.8 m) Alberta Farmers' Co-operative elevator was built in 1913. Before its demolition, it was one of the two oldest examples of standard Alberta Farmers' Elevator Company 1913–1917 design. It had a pyramidal roof, with a gable-roofed cupola housing the head of the leg. Archival photographs of other Alberta Farmers' Co-operative Elevator Company facilities suggest that this elevator originally had a track-side office and warehouse next to the elevator.

In 1913, the United Farmers of Alberta proposed the establishment of the Alberta Farmers' Elevator Company as a solution to producer problems in the province. Shares were issued to farmers at $60 each, payable in four annual installments. The Alberta government provided loans of 85 percent of the share sum. To market their grain and guarantee their loans during rapid wartime expansion, the Alberta Farmers' Co-operative Elevator Company relied on the experience of the Grain Growers Grain Company of Manitoba. In 1917 the companies merged to form the United Grain Growers, headquartered in Winnipeg, Manitoba.

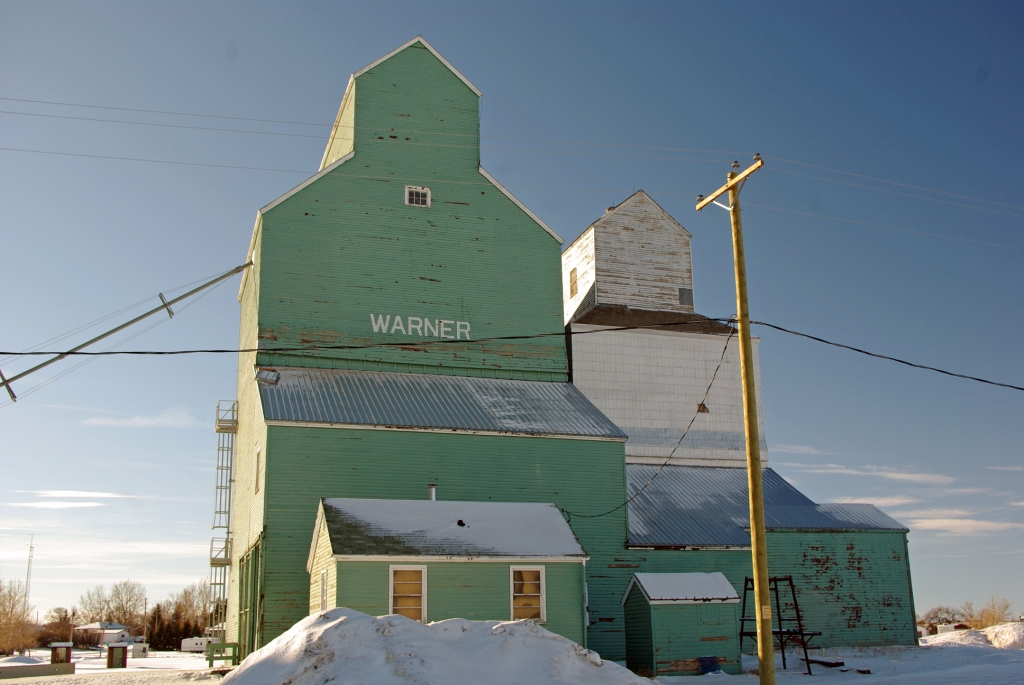
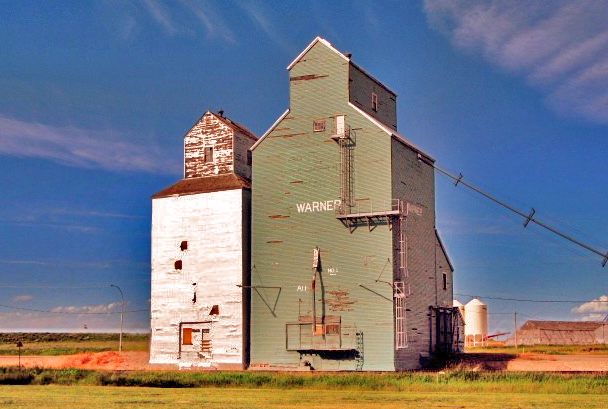
Two views of demolished 1913 Co-operative elevator, twinned with an Alberta Wheat Pool elevator in 1951

In 1928 the UGG sold their 1913 Warner elevator to the Alberta Pool Elevator Company. A coal shed associated with the elevator since 1926 was sold in 1940 and removed from the site. In 1940 a 35,000-imperial-bushel (1,300 m^{3}) balloon annex, built by the F. W. McDougall Construction Company, was added to the elevator and later removed. In 1951, the elevator was twinned with a new 38 × 42 × 65 feet (12 × 13 × 20 m), 60,000-imperial-bushel (2,200 m^{3}) elevator built by the pool; a new driveway was also built at this time. Both elevators have been demolished.

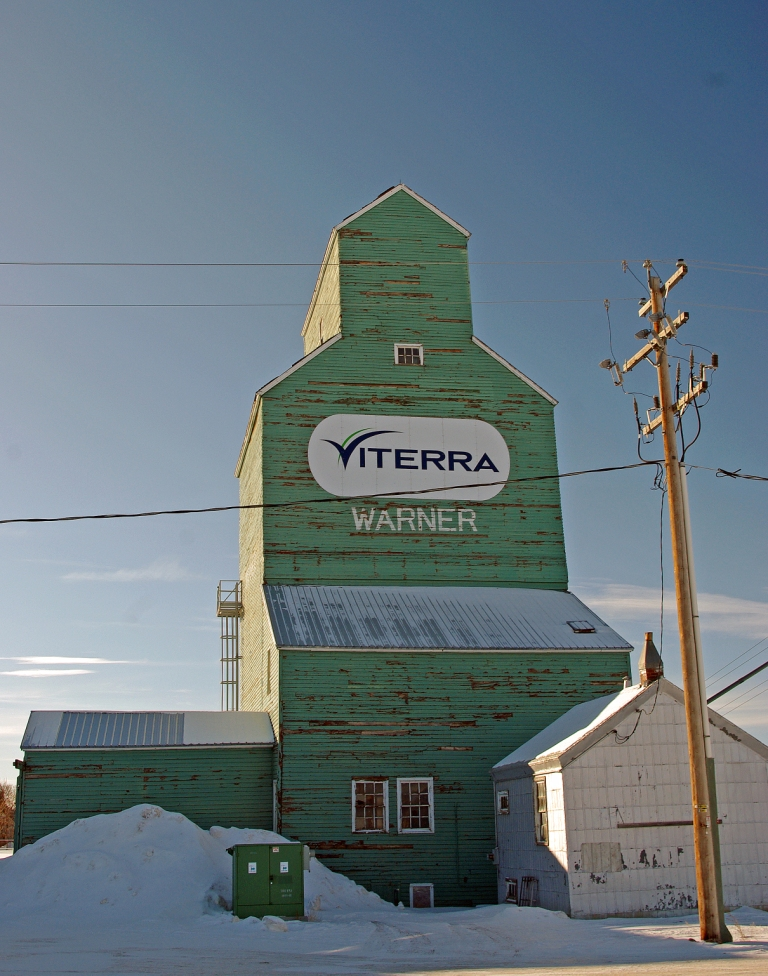
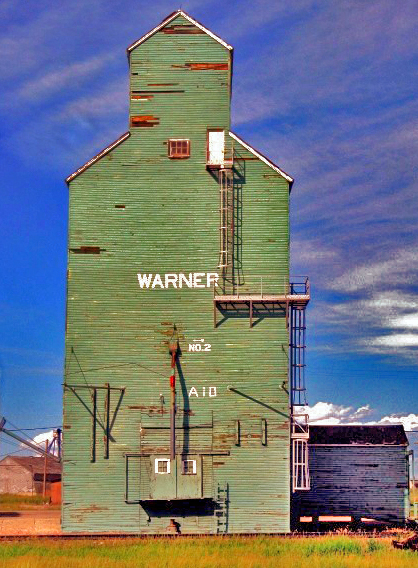
Road- and track-side views of 1928 Alberta Wheat Pool elevator

The 1928 Alberta Wheat Pool elevator was built by Voss Bros for the Alberta Pool Elevator Company in accordance with the standard 40,000-imperial-bushel (1,500 m^{3}) plan at a cost of $15,300. It measured 34 × 35 × 62 feet (10 × 11 × 19 m); a balloon annex built on the south side in 1940 was removed in 1995. The elevator has been demolished.

A 45,000-imperial-bushel (1,600 m^{3}) elevator was built in 1918 by the Alberta Pacific Grain Company, replacing a pre-1911 Alberta Pacific Elevator Company structure. It may have had an annex, since it was licensed in 1918 for 60,000 imperial bushels (2,200 m^{3}) and for 45,000 imperial bushels (1,600 m^{3}) in 1922. In 1953 a 23,000-imperial-bushel (840 m^{3}) annex (removed in 1997) was attached to the elevator's north side, and a second annex was added six years later. In 1967, the elevator was taken over by Federal Grain; the following year Federal built a new elevator, twinning it with the 1918 structure and moving the 1959 annex to the south side of the new elevator. A driveway the length of both elevators was also built at this time. In 1972 the complex was sold to Alberta Wheat Pool, and in the summer of 1997 it was the AWP No. 4 house.

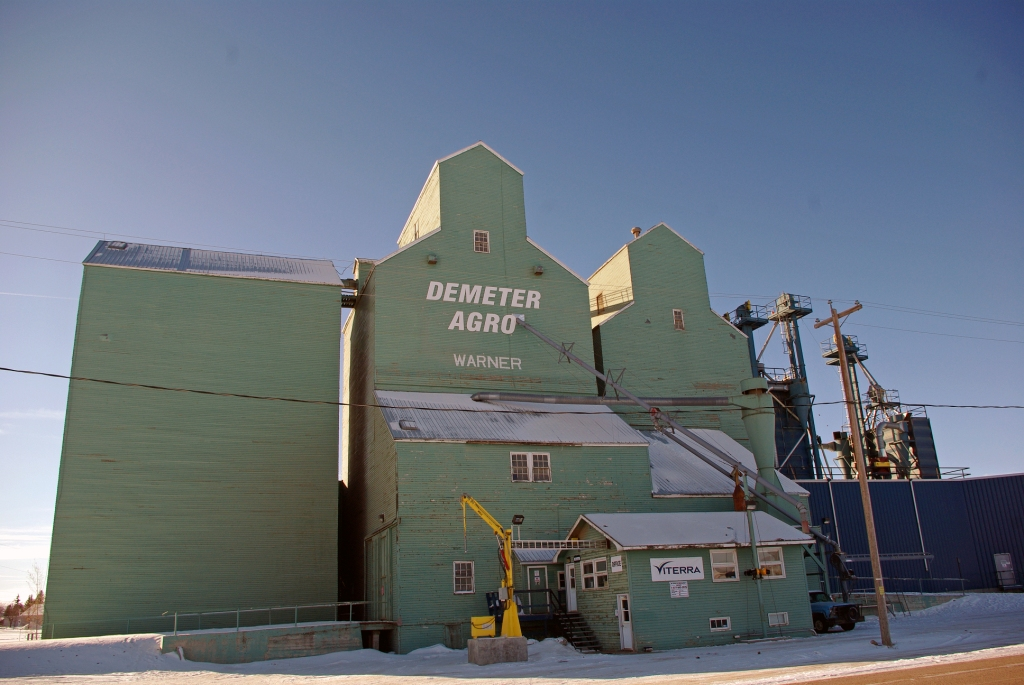
1918 Alberta Pacific elevator (right) and 1968 Federal Grain elevator

The 1968 65,000-imperial-bushel (2,400 m^{3}) Federal Grain elevator measures 38 × 44 × 66 feet (12 × 13 × 20 m), with an electronic scale and an exterior loading spout for trucks. It was among the last elevators built according to the traditional design, before the single composite design came into widespread use.

A 35,000-imperial-bushel (1,300 m^{3}) elevator was built by Ogilvie Flour Mills in 1929. A 30,000-imperial-bushel (1,100 m^{3}) balloon annex was added in 1940, followed by a 25,000-imperial-bushel (910 m^{3}) annex twelve years later. One annex was removed in 1997, and the elevator has been demolished.

A 40,000-imperial-bushel (1,500 m^{3}) elevator was built by the Ellison Milling and Flour Company in 1939, with annexes probably built during World War II as temporary storage. In 1974 it was sold to Parrish & Heimbecker, and to UGG in 1985. The elevator has been demolished.
