= Welling, Alberta =

Hamlet in Alberta, Canada

Welling
- Hamlet
- Location of Welling Welling (Canada)
- Coordinates: 49°28′52″N 112°47′08″W
- Country: Canada
- Province: Alberta
- Region: Southern Alberta
- Census division: 3
- Municipal district: Cardston County

Government
  - Type: Unincorporated
  - Governing body: Cardston County Council

Population (2008)
  - Total: 30
- Time zone: UTC−06:00 (Alberta Time)
- Area codes: 403, 587, 825

Welling is a hamlet in southern Alberta, Canada within Cardston County. It is located north of the junction of Highway 5 and Highway 52, approximately 30 kilometres (19 mi) south of the City of Lethbridge.

== Demographics ==
The population of Welling according to the 2008 municipal census conducted by Cardston County is 30.

== See also ==
- List of communities in Alberta
- List of hamlets in Alberta
