= Coutts, Alberta =

Village in Alberta, Canada

Coutts
- Village
- Village of Coutts
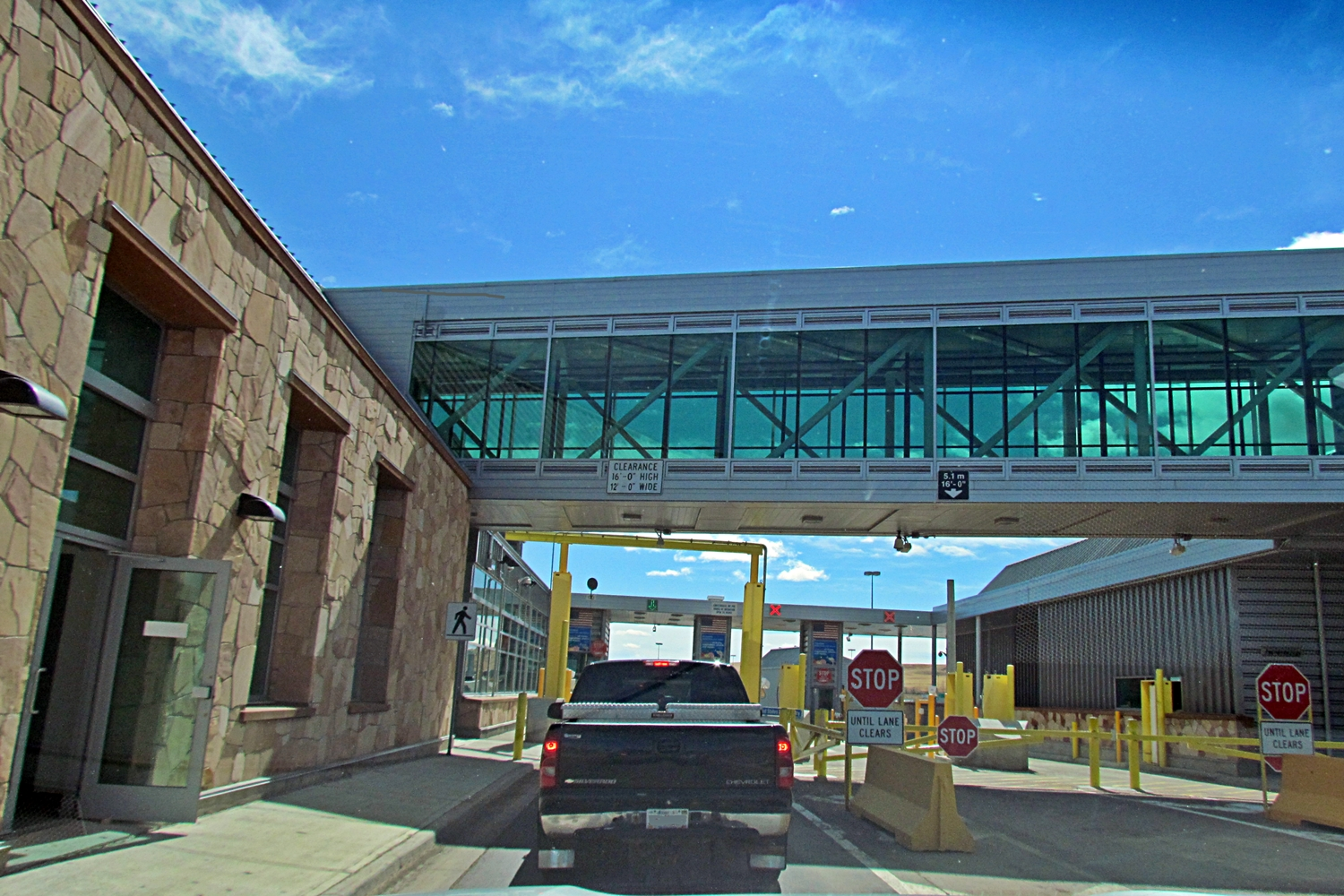
- Coutts border crossing, into the US
- Motto: The Gateway to Alberta
- Location within County of Warner

- Location in Alberta
- Coordinates: 49°00′23″N 111°57′51″W
- Country: Canada
- Province: Alberta
- Region: Southern Alberta
- Planning region: South Saskatchewan
- Municipal district: Warner
- Incorporated
  - Village: January 1, 1960

Government
  - Mayor: Scott MacCumber
  - Governing body: Coutts Village Council

Area (2021)
  - Land: 1.18 km^{2} (0.46 sq mi)
- Elevation: 1,070 m (3,510 ft)

Population (2021)
  - Total: 224
  - Density: 190.4/km^{2} (493/sq mi)
- Time zone: UTC−06:00 (Alberta Time)
- Area code: 403 / 587
- Highways: Highway 4; Highway 500; I-15
- Waterway: Milk River
- Website: www.couttsalberta.com

Coutts (/ˈkuːts/ KOOTS) is a border village in southern Alberta, Canada, that is a port of entry into the U.S. state of Montana. It is one of the busiest ports of entry on the Canada–United States border in western Canada. It connects Highway 4 to Interstate 15, an important trade route (CANAMEX Corridor) between Alberta, American states along I-15, and Mexico. It is 99 km to Lethbridge and 146 km to Medicine Hat.

The community has the name of William Burdett-Coutts, a railroad official.

In 2004, a joint border facility opened in Coutts–Sweet Grass, Montana, housing both Canadian and American federal authorities.

== History ==
In February 2022, four men were arrested on allegations that they conspired to kill Royal Canadian Mounted Police (RCMP) officers. The arrests occurred during the Canada convoy protest in Coutts. According to police, the plot was part of a wider plan to alter "Canada's political, justice and medical systems." In December 2022, Coutts was described by CTV News as a "village divided" as residents identified as supporting or opposing the protest earlier that year.

== Demographics ==
Federal census population history
Year	Pop.	±%
1996	386	—
2001	364	−5.7%
2006	305	−16.2%
2011	277	−9.2%
2016	245	−11.6%
2021	224	−8.6%
Source: Statistics Canada

In the 2021 Census of Population conducted by Statistics Canada, the Village of Coutts had a population of 224 living in 112 of its 152 total private dwellings, a change of −8.6% from its 2016 population of 245. With a land area of 1.18 km^{2} (0.46 sq mi), it had a population density of 189.8/km^{2} (491.7/sq mi) in 2021.

In the 2016 Census of Population conducted by Statistics Canada, the Village of Coutts recorded a population of 245 living in 122 of its 159 total private dwellings; this represents a change of −11.6% from its 2011 population of 277. With a land area of 1.24 km^{2} (0.48 sq mi), it had a population density of 197.6/km^{2} (511.7/sq mi) in 2016.

== See also ==
- List of communities in Alberta
