= Sweet Grass, Montana =

Census-designated place in Montana, United States, along the Canadian border

Sweetgrass, Montana
- Census-Designated Place
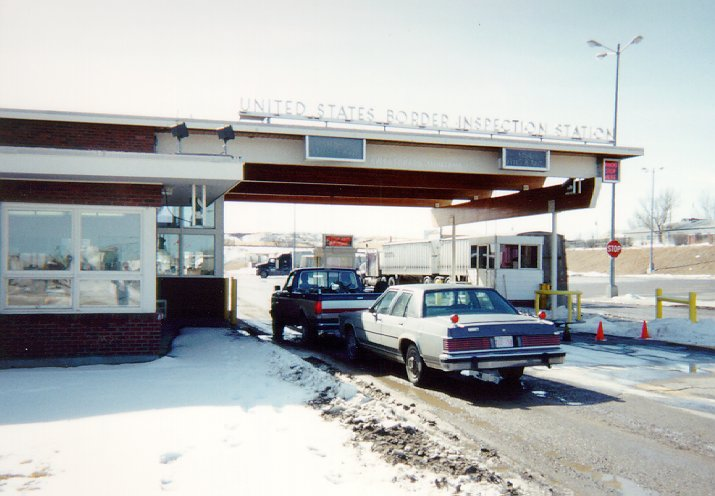
- Sweetgrass border station in 1997

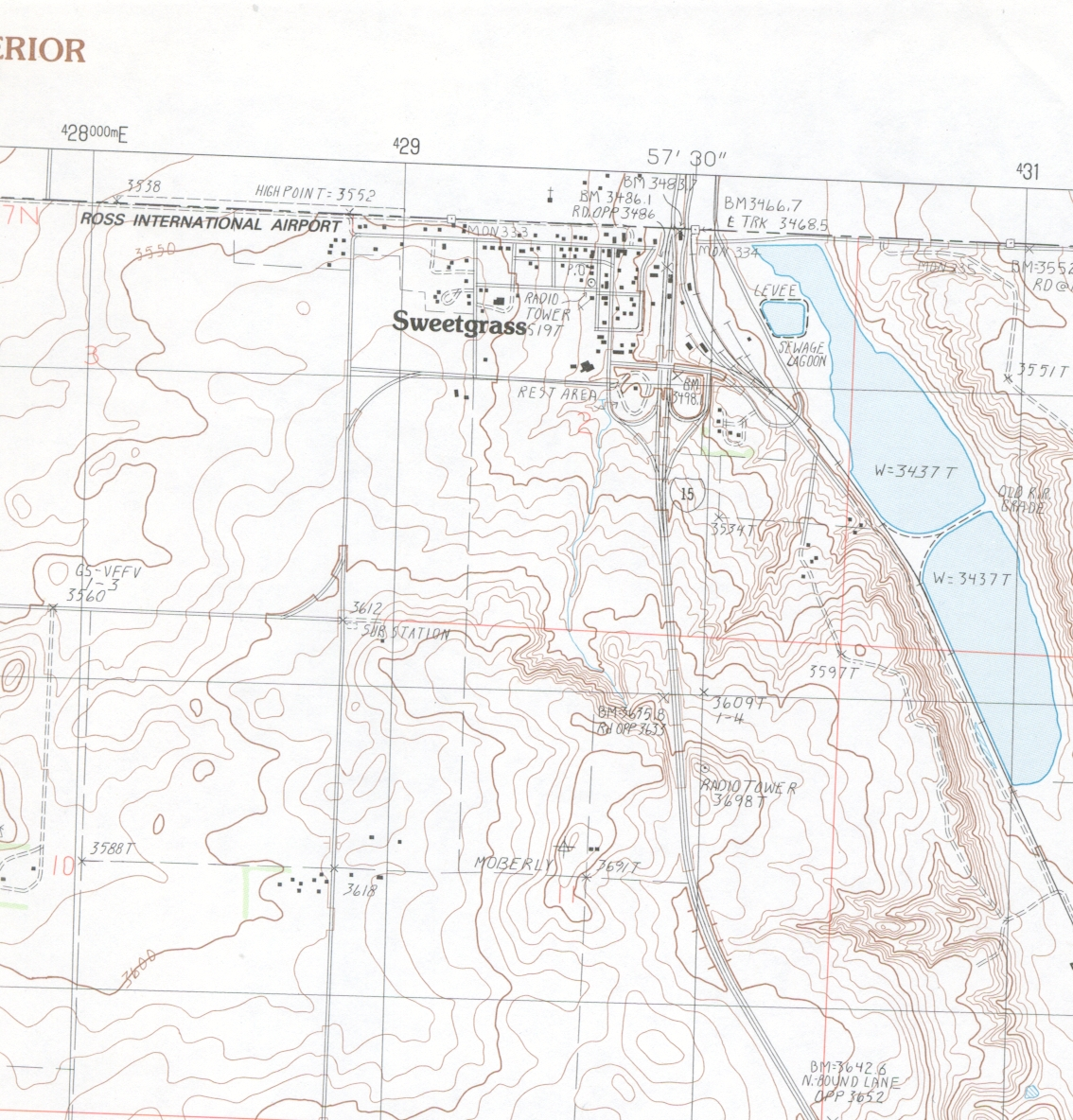
- Topographical map of the Sweet Grass area
- Coordinates: 48°59′46″N 111°57′38″W
- Country: United States
- State: Montana
- County: Toole

Area
  - Total: 0.48 sq mi (1.25 km^{2})
  - Land: 0.48 sq mi (1.25 km^{2})
  - Water: 0 sq mi (0.00 km^{2})
- Elevation: 3,547 ft (1,081 m)

Population (2020)
  - Total: 65
  - Density: 134.5/sq mi (51.94/km^{2})
- FIPS code: 30-73075
- GNIS feature ID: 2583856

Sweet Grass is a census-designated place and unincorporated community in Toole County, Montana, United States, on the Canada–United States border. It is the northern terminus of Interstate 15, an important route connecting western Canada, the western United States, and Mexico. The population was 65 according to the 2020 census.

In 2004, a joint border facility opened at the Sweetgrass port of entry and Coutts, Alberta, housing both Canadian and American federal authorities.

Fire service is provided through the volunteer fire department in Coutts.

It is 34 miles (55 km) to Shelby, 108 miles (174 km) to Havre and 174 miles (280 km) to Missoula.

== Climate ==
Sweet Grass has a semi-arid climate (Köppen BSk) that closely borders a humid continental climate (Köppen Dwb).

Climate data for Sweet Grass, Montana
Month	Jan	Feb	Mar	Apr	May	Jun	Jul	Aug	Sep	Oct	Nov	Dec	Year
Record high °F (°C)	64 (18)	70 (21)	72 (22)	84 (29)	91 (33)	96 (36)	105 (41)	105 (41)	95 (35)	88 (31)	74 (23)	67 (19)	105 (41)
Mean daily maximum °F (°C)	31 (−1)	35 (2)	43 (6)	54 (12)	65 (18)	73 (23)	82 (28)	81 (27)	70 (21)	57 (14)	40 (4)	31 (−1)	55 (13)
Mean daily minimum °F (°C)	8 (−13)	12 (−11)	20 (−7)	30 (−1)	39 (4)	47 (8)	52 (11)	50 (10)	42 (6)	31 (−1)	19 (−7)	10 (−12)	30 (−1)
Record low °F (°C)	−39 (−39)	−35 (−37)	−29 (−34)	−7 (−22)	16 (−9)	30 (−1)	35 (2)	30 (−1)	12 (−11)	−12 (−24)	−26 (−32)	−44 (−42)	−44 (−42)
Average precipitation inches (mm)	0.30 (7.6)	0.23 (5.8)	0.58 (15)	1.00 (25)	2.61 (66)	3.13 (80)	1.96 (50)	1.94 (49)	1.45 (37)	0.62 (16)	0.45 (11)	0.30 (7.6)	14.57 (370)
Average snowfall inches (cm)	9.5 (24)	8.3 (21)	8.9 (23)	6.6 (17)	2.3 (5.8)	0.4 (1.0)	0.1 (0.25)	0.1 (0.25)	2.6 (6.6)	4.2 (11)	7.4 (19)	9.1 (23)	59.5 (151.9)

== Demographics ==
Historical population
Census	Pop.	Note	%±
2020	65		—
U.S. Decennial Census
