= 2021 Montana train derailment =

Amtrak passenger train accident near Joplin, Montana

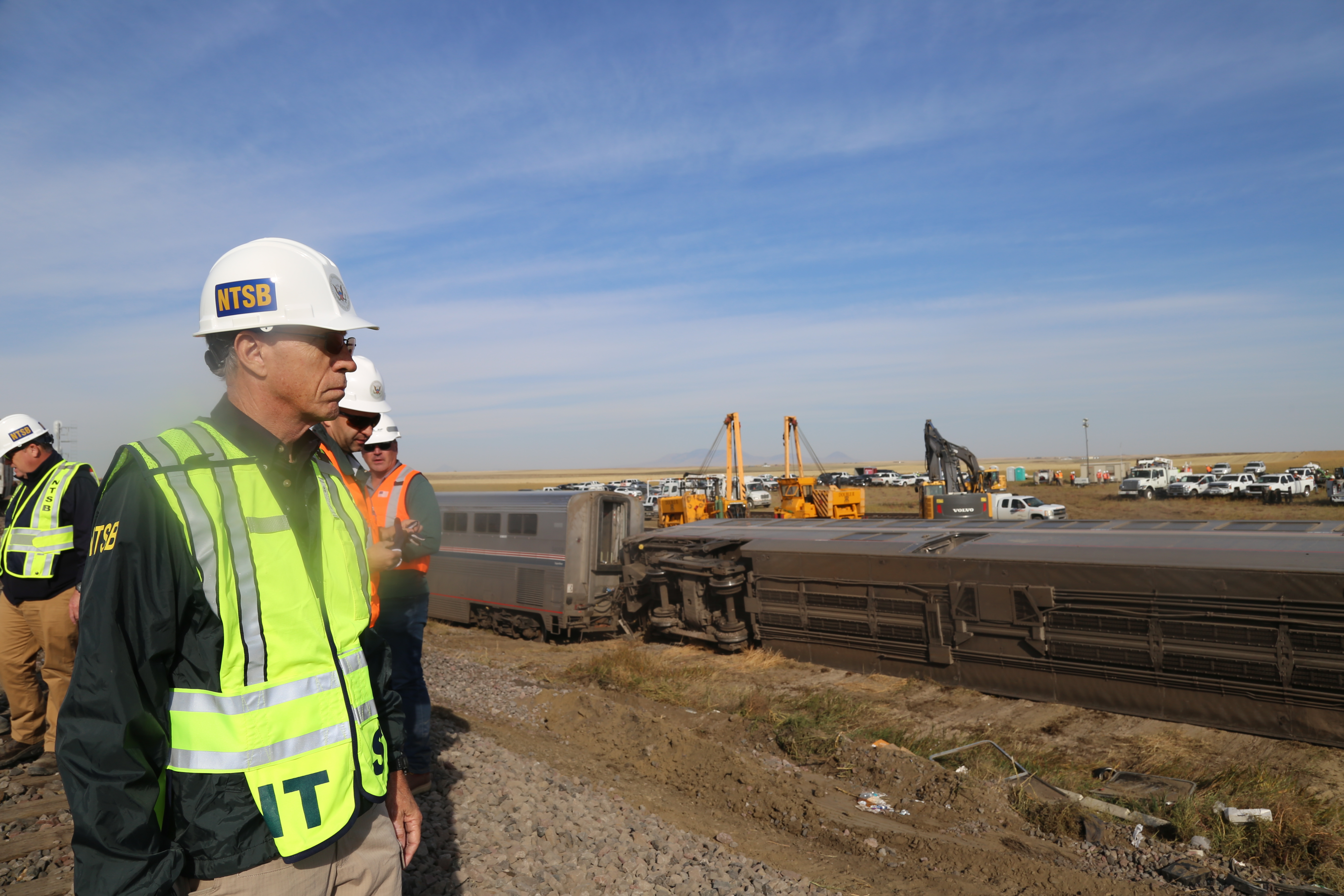
- NTSB Vice Chairman Bruce Landsberg at the accident site

- Location within Montana

Details
- Date: September 25, 2021; 4 years ago 3:56 PM MDT (21:56 UTC)
- Location: Joplin, Montana; 2 mi (3.2 km) west of town
- Coordinates: 48°33′30″N 110°48′57″W
- Country: United States
- Line: Hi-Line
- Operator: Amtrak (passenger train); BNSF Railway (railroad)
- Service: Empire Builder
- Incident type: Derailment
- Cause: Problem with tracks (bent tracks)

Statistics
- Trains: 1
- Passengers: 149
- Crew: 16
- Deaths: 3
- Injured: 49 (15 hospitalized)
- Damage: Yes
Empire Builder

On September 25, 2021, at 3:56 p.m. Mountain Daylight Time, Amtrak passenger train 7/27, the westbound Empire Builder, carrying 149 passengers and 16 crew members, derailed west of the town of Joplin, Montana, United States. The train consisted of two locomotives and ten cars, eight of which derailed.

Three people were killed, and 49 others were injured, with 15 of them being hospitalized.

== Background ==
The Empire Builder is a long-distance passenger rail service operated by Amtrak traveling on tracks of the BNSF Railway between the cities of Chicago and Seattle or Portland. Trains are split or combined at Spokane, with the Portland section being at the rear of westbound trains.

The derailment occurred on the Hi-Line, a portion of the BNSF's Northern Transcon. BNSF conducted its most recent inspection of the section through Joplin on September 23, 2021. The last major Amtrak accident in Montana occurred in 1988, when an Empire Builder train hit a track buckle and derailed in Saco.

== Derailment ==
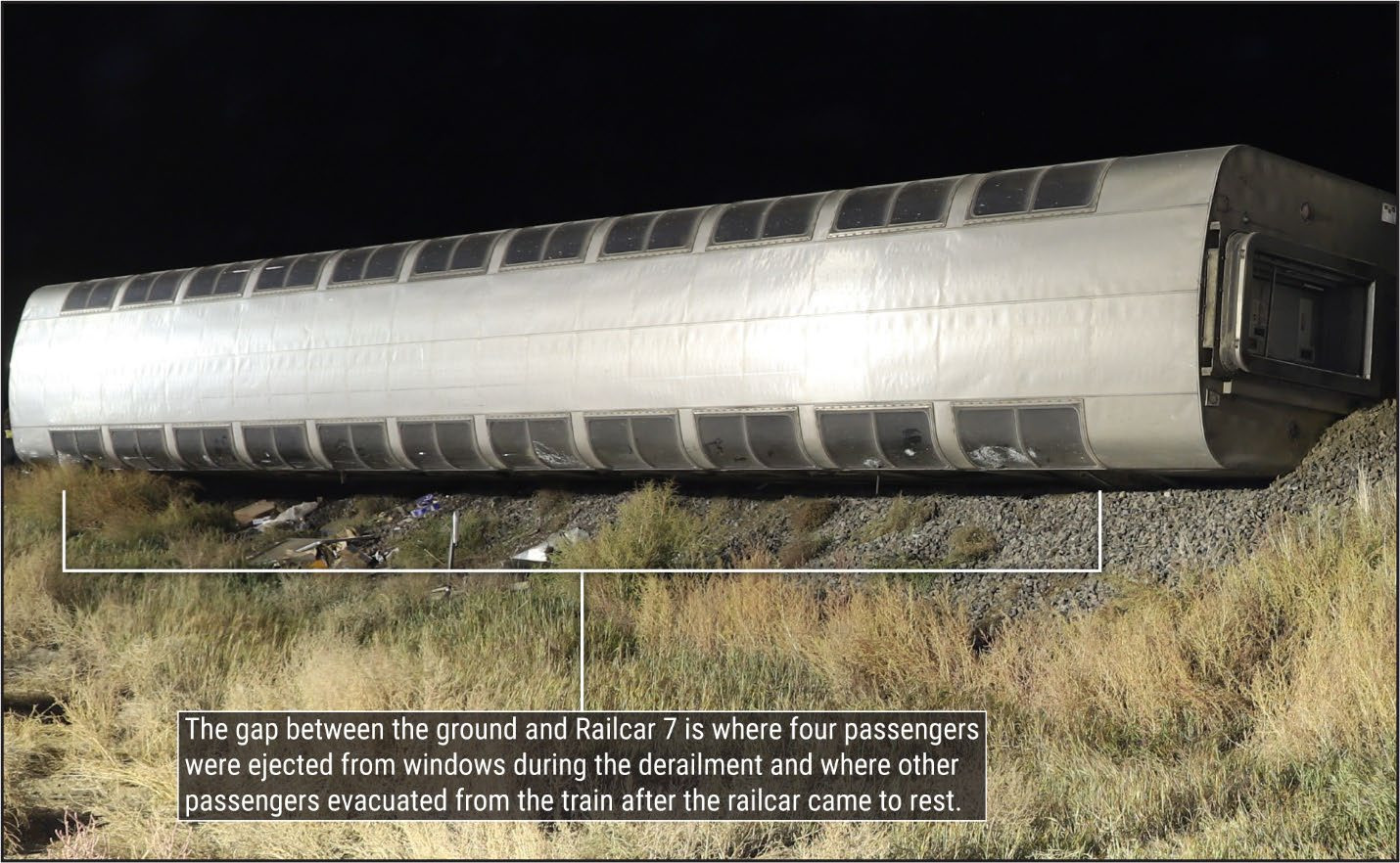
One of the overturned cars

The westbound Empire Builder train 7/27, operating with two P42DC locomotives (units #74 and #38) and 10 railcars (one baggage car followed by nine Superliners), was carrying 149 passengers and 19 crew members at the time of the derailment. At 3:56 p.m., while traveling just under the speed limit of 79 mph, the eight rear cars derailed near the town of Joplin, Montana, located 150 miles (240 km) northeast of Helena. The train was at the east end of Buelow siding.

The rear four cars (a Sightseer Lounge, two coaches and a sleeper), all destined for Portland, tipped over after derailing. Three people on board were killed, and 49 others were injured, including 15 who were hospitalized.

NTSB Vice Chairman Bruce Landsberg stated that the Empire Builder derailment happened at a gradual right-hand curve, just prior to reaching a railroad switch at the entrance to a railway siding while travelling on the single-track mainline, contrary to previous speculation that a defect with the switch itself caused the accident. According to The New York Times, several passengers reported a "bumpy" ride before the derailment.

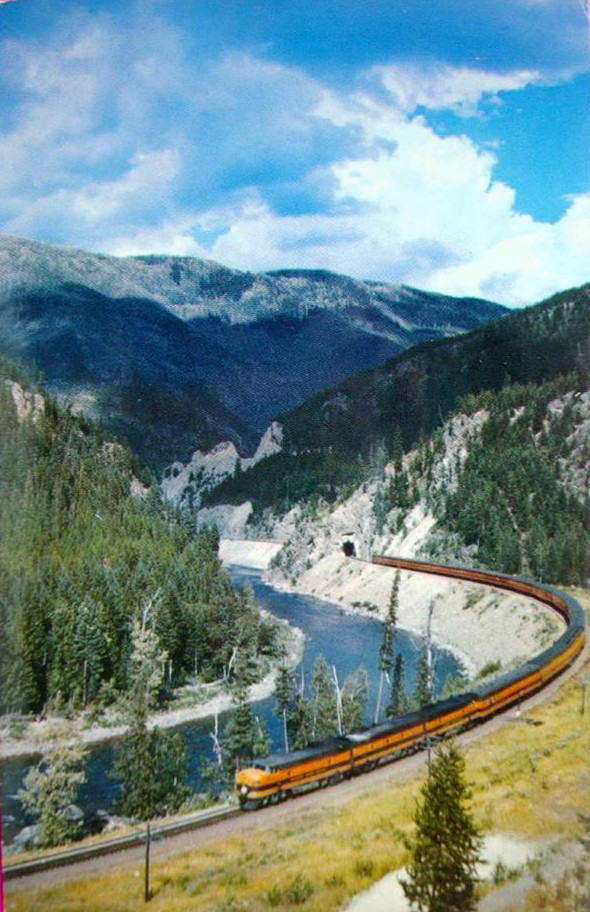
The Western Star, the companion service to the Empire Builder (at the time both services were operated by Great Northern) that run over the same route. On March 7, 1966 the Western Star collided head-on with the Builder at the entrance to the Buelow siding, the same location where 55 years later the Amtrak train derailment would occur.

The derailment occurred at the same location where 55 years earlier, on 7 March 1966, the Builder eastbound collided head-on with the Western Star traveling in the opposite direction. In the accident, the two crew members of the Western Star were fatally injured, and 77 people were injured. This incident, one of the most serious in the history of the service, became known as the Great Northern Buelow Wreck.

== Response ==
Emergency personnel from six local counties were dispatched to the derailment site, and five hospitals were put on standby to treat injured passengers. Three people were transported to Benefis Hospital in Great Falls and two others were treated at Logan Health in Kalispell. Non-injured passengers were taken to the Liberty County Senior Center in Joplin, Chester High School in Chester, and hotels in Shelby. Residents of nearby communities provided food and assistance to passengers after an emergency siren alerted them to the incident. A section of nearby U.S. Route 2 was closed to allow for emergency access. Three air ambulance helicopters were sent to the scene.

Amtrak announced the deployment of their Incident Response Team along with emergency personnel and agency leaders. Service was immediately suspended between Minot, North Dakota, and Shelby, Montana, and later Empire Builder trips were truncated to Minneapolis. Track repair crews from BNSF Railway were also brought to the site to replace damaged railroad ties and roadbed. The line was closed until September 28.

== Investigations ==
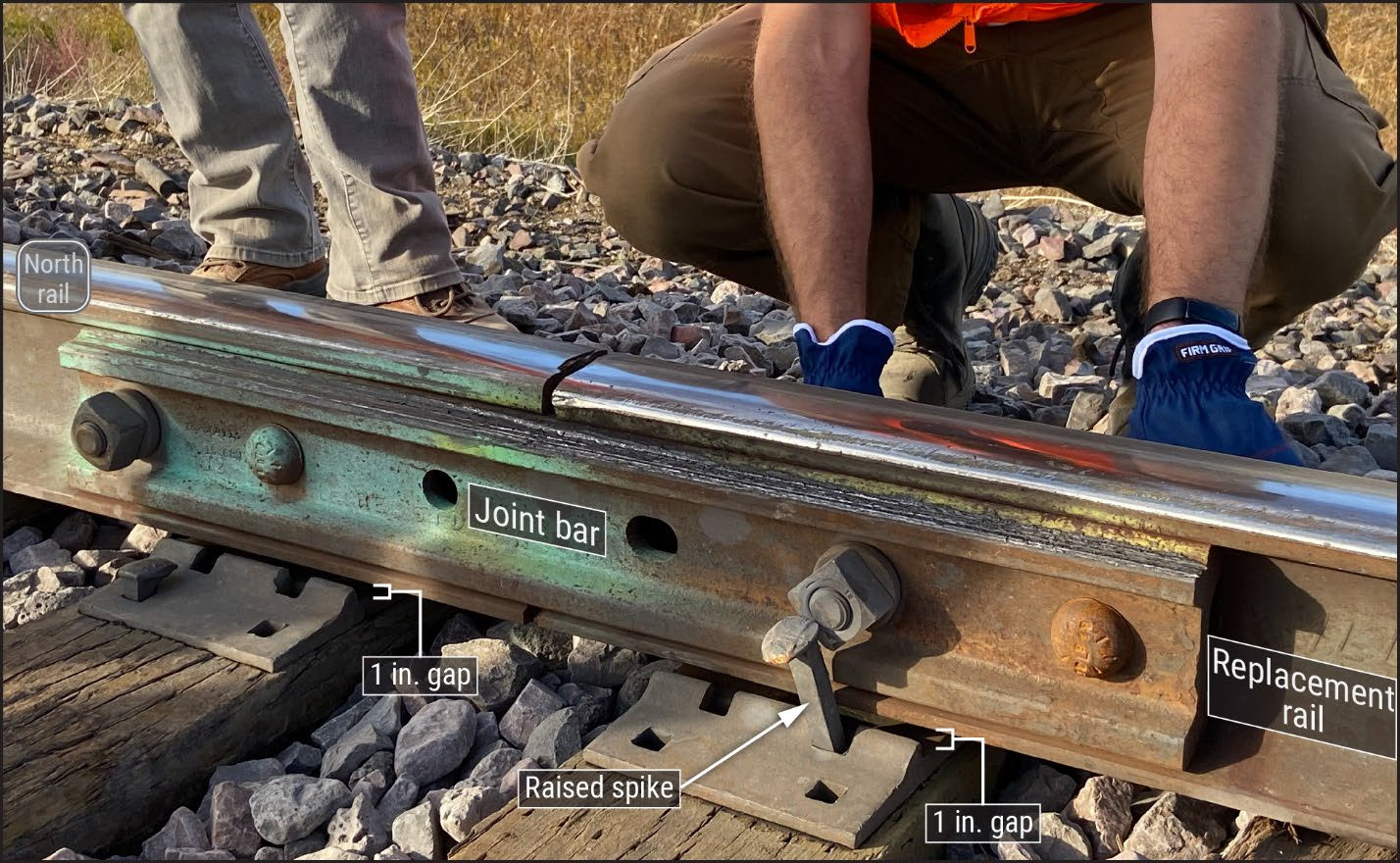
NTSB photo showing a track joint with vertical displacement

The National Transportation Safety Board (NTSB) opened an investigation into the derailment and dispatched a 14-person "go-team". Those investigators arrived on September 26 and were expected to remain on-site for approximately one week. The NTSB team held their first press conference the following afternoon, after formally taking over the investigation from Liberty County Disaster and Emergency Services. A preliminary report was expected within 30 days.

The Federal Railroad Administration (FRA) announced on September 26 that it had sent a team of 18 technical experts to the site to initiate a forensic investigation that will also support the NTSB investigation.

Amtrak and BNSF each had their own investigators and incident response personnel on-site within one day of the derailment.

In July 2023, the NTSB released their final report into the derailment. The report cited poor track conditions — worn and damaged track — missed by the railroad's inspectors for the derailment as the cause of accident. Unstable rail bed also contributed to the derailment. Additionally, the NTSB stated the failure of some windows to stay in place caused passenger ejections, contributing to the severity of injuries.

== See also ==
- 1966 Great Northern Buelow collision
- List of accidents on Amtrak
