= 1966 Great Northern Buelow collision =

Head-on train wreck in Montana, US

Great Northern Buelow Wreck

Details
- Date: March 7, 1966 (60 years ago) at 11:08 AM MST (18:08 UTC)
- Location: Buelow; 5 mi (8.0 km) east from Chester, Montana
- Coordinates: 48.555357°N 110.860582°W
- Country: United States
- Operator: Great Northern Railway
- Service: Empire Builder and Western Star
- Incident type: Head-on collision
- Cause: Human error (disputed)

Statistics
- Trains: 2
- Passengers: 145
- Deaths: 2
- Injured: 77 (29 hospitalized)
- Damage: All locomotives of the Empire Builder were damaged or destroyed; all cars of the Empire Builder were damaged; all locomotives of the Western Star were derailed and some or both of the trucks of many of the cars of the Western Star were derailed.

The Great Northern Buelow Wreck occurred on March 7, 1966, when two Great Northern Railway trains, an eastbound Empire Builder passenger train and a westbound Western Star mail and passenger train, collided near Chester, Montana. Two were killed, 77 were injured, and 29 were hospitalized.

== Background ==
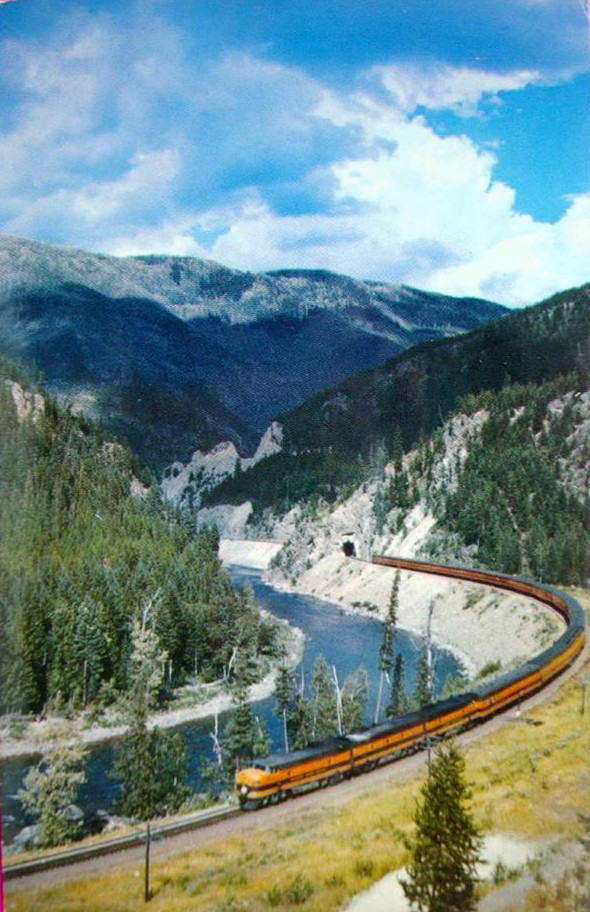
The Western Star was a companion train to the Empire Builder.

The Empire Builder is a long-distance passenger train operated at the time of the accident by Great Northern Railway. It travels from Seattle and Portland to Chicago. The Western Star was a passenger and mail train that was also operated by Great Northern Railway between Chicago and the Pacific Northwest. It would travel slower than the Empire Builder and called at more stops. It also had dedicated mail cars. (Note: By the time of the accident, the Western Star had been combined with the Fast Mail line, and carried mail not only in its baggage and RPO, like the Empire Builder, but also in specific mail cars.)

Before the accident, both trains were delayed by snow storms. There was 6–8 inches (15–20 cm) of snow at the site of the accident at the time of the incident, but the weather was clear.

The Buelow passing siding is on the on tracks of the Hi-Line subdivision of the present-day BNSF Railway between Havre and Shelby near Chester. The 2021 Montana train derailment happened at the same siding 55 years later.

== Summary ==
In the morning of March 7, 1966, the Empire Builder #32 passenger train was headed east and approaching the west side of the Buelow passing siding. At the same time, the Western Star #27 was headed west, approaching the same siding on its east end. The Empire Builder had been directed by the Havre dispatcher to enter the siding, which is 5 miles (8.0 km) east of Chester and about 47 miles (76 km) west of Havre, Montana; the Empire Builder was approximately 500 feet (150 m) from the siding traveling at 12 miles per hour (19 km/h) while the #27 passenger and mail train approached the siding at a speed of 79 miles per hour (127 km/h). The reason for the high speed of the #27 was unknown, but it ultimately contributed to the head-on collision of the two trains, as the Empire Builder was unable to side before being struck by the fast-approaching Western Star. The ensuing wreck that occurred at 11:08 AM caused the death of the two train engineers and 77 injuries.

The Western Star train was crewed by Bernard "Barney" L. Runyan, Engineer; Dick Parks, Conductor; Roger Hardy, Fireman; and Bruce Pfrimmer, Head Brakeman. Eric "Sonny" A. Walters was the engineer of the Empire Builder, crewed together with Minor Stocking, Conductor; Arnold Hale, Fireman; Harry Maddux, Head Brakeman; and Richard "Dick" Guymon, Rear Brakeman. Both engineers were killed in the accident; Runyan, 67, and Walters, 68, were both residents of Whitefish, Montana. Coincidentally, the train company's president, John M. Budd, and vice president for operations, John L. Robson, were on the Empire Builder during the accident but were unharmed.

== Response ==
Ruben Halverson, an employee of Great Northern in Chester, got a call on the radio from someone in the crashed business car, perhaps President Budd, alerting him to the wreck; he sounded the fire alarm and notified the emergency personnel. Help arrived from Chester in minutes. Dr. Richard Buker was one of the first to arrive. Ambulances came soon after from Chester, Shelby, Rudyard, and Havre.

One onlooker said the scene "was almost as if an explosion had occurred with hundreds of pieces of metal scattered about". Mail that was being transported by the trains together with other goods were strewn everywhere. Postal authorities quickly gathered the loose deliveries, ascertaining them all. Many people were treated at the scene and 29 were transported to the hospital; uninjured passengers were transported away from the incident by school buses. Train officials said the mail and express cars behind the locomotives probably took much of the blow, reducing the number of injuries and fatalities; the trains' configurations, however, were not stated as such a factor in the official report.

== Investigations ==
An official investigation was initiated on March 8, 1966, the day after the wreck which was led by superintendent Eugene Coan of Great Falls. Paul F. Cruikshank, a spokesman for the railway company in Spokane, Washington asserted the same day of the accident that the westbound train driven by Runyan "went through red signals". The Liberty County sheriff concurred, saying the Western Star ran through "one red light for sure." Other train officials closer to the scene in Whitefish, however, "were in a quandary as to the cause of the head on train wreck...and some believe the answer may never be known". This dilemma resulted from the testimony of multiple witnesses who said that the signal at the east end of the siding was green, indicating to Engineer Runyan that the track ahead was clear. There were rumors that the signal system was not working. (Note: Dave Sprau, who became a train dispatcher in Havre six years after the accident, heard these rumors; he said it was "silly" to think that a respected, veteran railroader like Runyan would believe such rumors and ignore red and yellow signals, especially when he knew the Empire Builder was on the main track.)

The westbound Western Star, carrying 88 passengers and a load of mail, had the right of way on the main track. It is for this reason, that the eastbound Empire Builder, a passenger train carrying 57 persons, had been directed into the siding at Buelow. The signal for this train was verified after the accident to be red over yellow, indicating that the Havre dispatcher had centrally triggered the switch to allow the Empire Builder to enter the siding. Consequently, it slowed to 30 miles per hour (48 km/h), so it could stop in the siding while the oncoming train passed on the main track. The collision happened prior to the eastbound train entering the siding, however, resulting in a head-on strike.

The westbound Western Star could not see the slow approaching train because it was obscured by a hill, a common topographic phenomenon in the rolling hills of the Golden Triangle where the accident took place. This left Engineer Runyan to rely solely on the track's signals which were centrally controlled. Several witnesses present at the accident claimed immediately after the wreck that Runyan's signal at the east end of the Buelow switch was green when it should have been yellow. If it were yellow, Runyan should have slowed to 30 miles per hour (48 km/h) and the signal at the west end of the siding should have been red, indicating to Runyan that the track ahead was obscured by the fateful Empire Builder. Consequently, Runyan, a veteran railroader, missed important signals or there was at least one device failure.

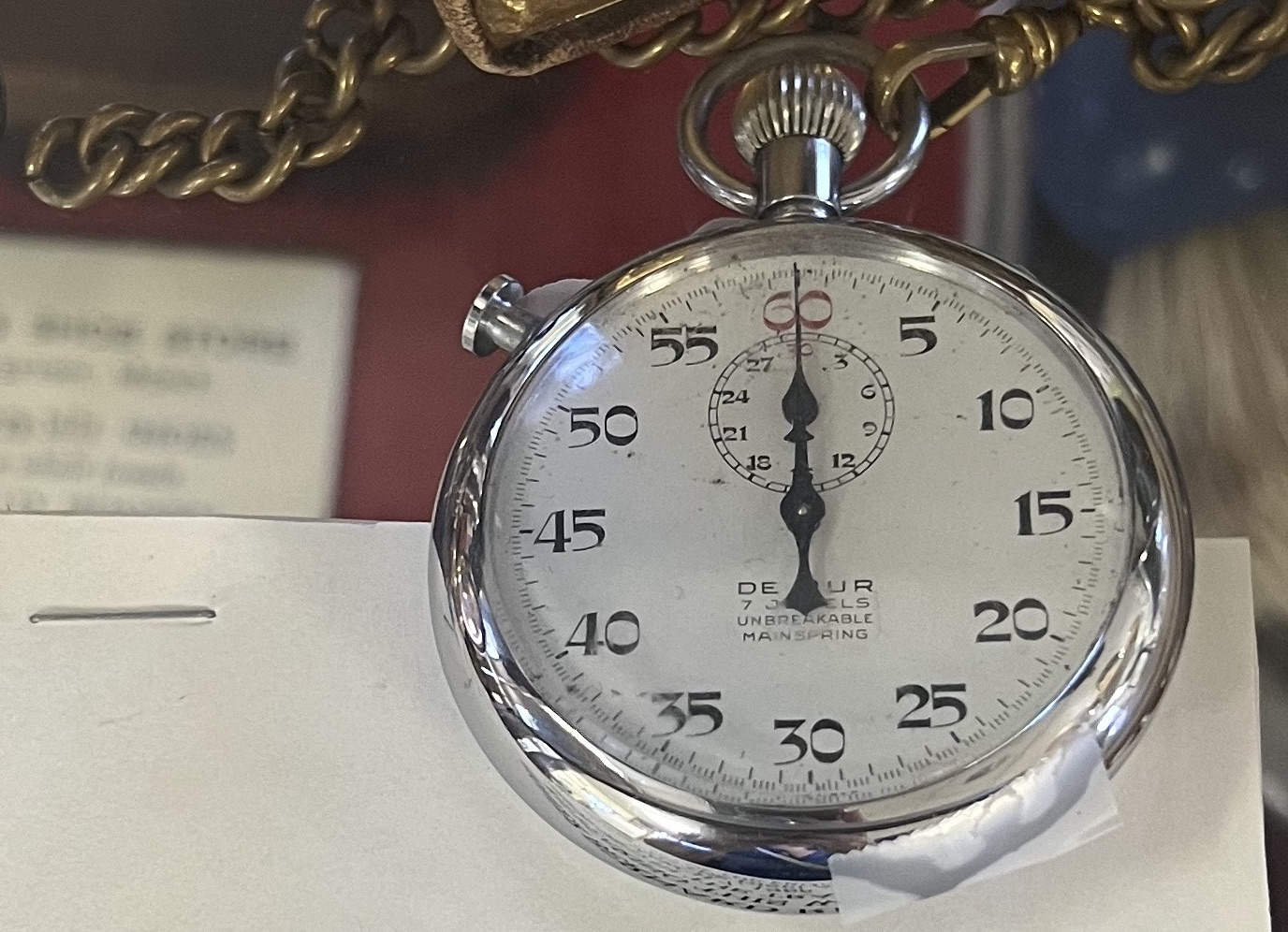
Slightly broken pocket watch of Bernard Runyan, engineer on the Western Star, recovered from the scene of the accident

An autopsy of Runyan showed that the cause of his death was injuries he sustained in the accident. It also "showed no carbon monoxide poising, no natural diseases, no alcohol, and no drugs or pain killers" were present in the engineer's body. As a result, the autopsy "gave no clues [as to] why [the] two passenger trains collided head-on". A station attendant at Joplin said that he heard the horn of the Western Star, indicating that Runyan was alert just minutes before the accident. The Western Star was on a "make-up schedule", trying to regain time it lost over the weekend due to a historic blizzard that hit the Northern Plains, delaying it in Breckenridge, Minnesota. Despite the long and hurried trip, Runyan had alighted the Western Star in Havre and had been off duty for two days prior to starting his drive from that point in the interstate journey. Before leaving Havre, he told Hardy, the fireman onboard who was the most seriously injured survivor, that he was well rested; Runyan was also aware that the Empire Builder was due in the eastbound direction and had not been overtaken. All of these factors make the notion that the wreck was due to operator error questionable in light of eyewitness accounts saying the signal at the east end of the switch was green.

Both Engineer Walters and Fireman Hale jumped from the Empire Builder moments before the collision after seeing there was nothing more they could do to avoid it. Walters was found dead on the ground, but Hale survived with only minor injuries. Fireman Hardy, from the Western Star suffered a serious head injury.

The findings of Great Northern were not made public, and the company held a hearing about the collision behind closed doors five days after the accident. After which, the viewpoint of the Great Northern investigating officials ultimately prevailed, laying the blame on Runyan which the Railroad Safety and Service Board of the Interstate Commerce Commission concurred with in its official report. Had the alternative view that a signal failure caused the crash won over instead, Runyan would have been absolved of any fault and Great Northern would have had to compensate Runyan's survivors.

== See also ==
- List of American railroad accidents
- List of rail accidents (1960–1969)
- 2021 Montana train derailment
