= Joseph E. Rehal =

American businessman

- Born: Joseph Elias Rehal; 14 July 1872; Zahlé, Ottoman Syria
- Died: 8 February 1923; Casper, Wyoming
- Occupation: Businessman
- Years active: 1888–1899
- Parent(s): Bekash Rehal; Elias Rehal

Joseph Elias Rehal (Arabic: جوزيف الياس رحال; 14 July 1872 – 8 February 1923) was a Lebanese-American merchant and farmer, who was the founder of Joplin, Montana. Rehal had valuable real estate holdings and is known to have built the first four buildings of the town.

== Early life ==
Rehal was born into a Christian family in Zahlé, Ottoman Syria (now Lebanon), the son of Elias and Bekash Rehal. His father, who was engaged in the liquor business, played a major role in the defense of Zahlé during the 1860 civil conflict in Mount Lebanon and Damascus.

Rehal attended school in Zahlé until he was sixteen. He worked at his father's business until 1888, when Rehal and his four brothers immigrated to America.

== Founding Joplin ==
Rehal immigrated to the United States in 1892. He worked as a dry goods merchant in Great Falls, Montana. He filed a homestead in Chouteau County, Montana and in 1910 founded the village of Joplin, becoming the first postmaster. Rehal erected the first four buildings in Joplin, one of them being Park Hotel. It was recognized as the best hotel between Havre and Shelby. Rehal and E. C. Tolley are jointly credited for establishing the town. They promoted rival parts of the town, which led to uneven and scattered business development. They erected a large new sign by the railroad crossing facing the depot.

== Later life ==
From 1912–14, Rehal worked as a merchant with his brother Shebel Rehal, then returned to farming and raising horses in Chester, Montana. In 1921, he returned to his mercantile business in Casper, Wyoming. He died there following a stroke in 1923. He was survived by his wife and five children.
