= Golden Triangle (Montana) =

Agricultural region of Montana, United States

Coordinates: 48.2°N 111.0°W

The Golden Triangle of Montana is a folk region in the northern plains of Montana, United States, renowned for its extensive wheat farming. Situated between the cities of Shelby, Great Falls, and Havre, this area encompasses some of the most productive agricultural land in the state. The fertile soil, combined with favorable climatic conditions, has made the Golden Triangle a vital agricultural hub, contributing significantly to Montana's economy and its status as a top producer of wheat in the nation.

== Geography ==
The Golden Triangle occupies a vast expanse of land in north-central Montana, spanning parts of several counties including Cascade, Toole, Glacier, Teton, Liberty, Hill, Chouteau, and Pondera. The region's landscape is characterized by expansive plains, rolling hills, and occasional coulees, offering ideal conditions for large-scale wheat cultivation. Readily available water from the Missouri River watershed including the Marias River as well as the Missouri itself lend to the agricultural potential of the area.

== Agriculture ==
Wheat farming is the primary agricultural activity in the Golden Triangle, with the region being particularly renowned for its hard red winter wheat, whose growing season runs from September through the following year until harvest in late summer. Farmers in the area also cultivate other cereal crops such as barley and oats, as well as oilseed crops like canola. The combination of rich soil, ample sunshine, and moderate rainfall creates optimal conditions for high-yield crop production, attracting agricultural enterprises and individual farmers alike.

== Economics ==
The agricultural output of the Golden Triangle plays a crucial role in Montana's economy. The Wheat Industry contributed around $2 Billion in 2012. The success of agriculture in the Golden Triangle has led to the development of supporting industries and infrastructure, including grain elevators, processing facilities, and transportation networks for efficient distribution of crops to domestic and international markets. Many farms employ advanced farming techniques and equipment to maximize yields. There are various varieties of wheat that are planted both in the Spring and Winter, with a big determining factor by farmers as to which variety they will grow being resistance to the Sawfly.

== History ==
European descendants have called this region of Montana home since the late 1800s. The Great Northern Railway built through the area west of Havre in 1890 with their mainline to Seattle fully operational in 1893. GN also built a line to Great Falls, which eventually continued to Helena and Butte. In Great Falls there were connections with the Northern Pacific Railway and the Milwaukee Road. GN advertised for these lands and ran special trains for immigrants coming from the Eastern United States as well as Europe, known as Immigrant Cars. The Homestead Acts put into action by the Federal Government of the United States allowed for farmers to grab up land and begin the agricultural processes. Towns such as Conrad, Chester, Kevin, and Sunburst were created to support this agriculture. Generally built along the railroads, these towns allowed for the wheat to be collected and stored in grain elevators while awaiting the railroad to ship it to its destinations. Services needed by farmers and their families such as mechanics for equipment, grocery stores, healthcare, law enforcement, and other services were generally located in towns such as these.

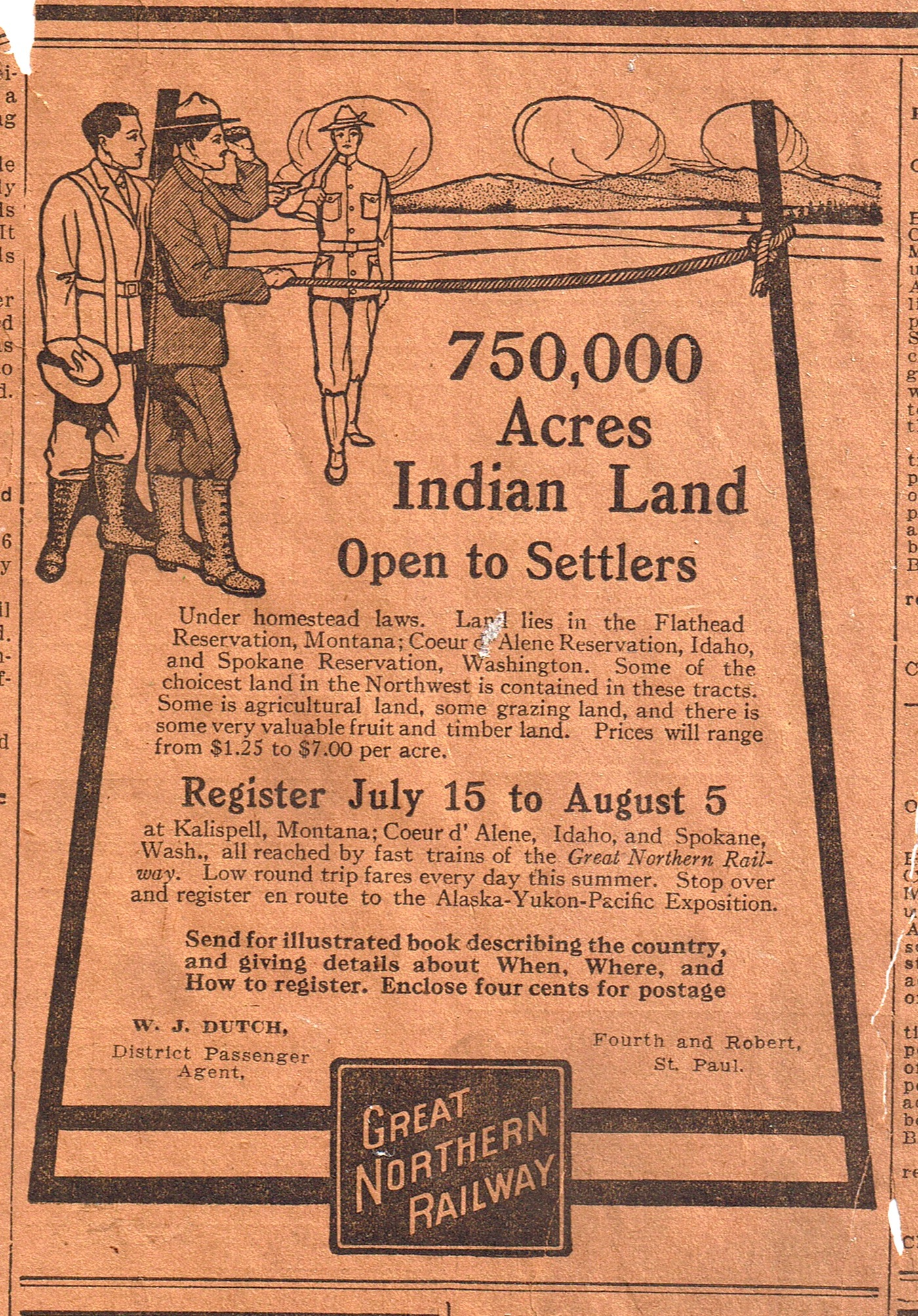
A 1909 ad advertising the Great Northern's Immigrant Car service, advertising lands such as those of the Golden Triangle.

== Transportation ==
Other than the aforementioned railroads, The US Interstate and Highway systems contribute greatly to the region. US 2 runs through the northern section of the triangle, Interstate 15 runs across the western edge, and US 87 runs across the region to the east. These highways serve as vital links and lifelines for these communities, allowing for products such as agricultural equipment, fertilizer, sprinklers, and more to come directly to the farms themselves. Some people even expand the definition of the Golden triangle, taking it's Northwest apex from Shelby at the intersection of I-15 and US 2 and instead shifting it west to Browning where US 2 meets US 89.
