= Liberty County Airport (Montana) =

- IATA: none; ICAO: KLTY; FAA LID: LTY

Summary
- Airport type: Public
- Owner: Liberty County
- Serves: Chester, Montana
- Elevation AMSL: 3,160 ft / 963 m
- Coordinates: 48°30′39″N 110°59′27″W
- Interactive map of Liberty County Airport

Runways
Direction	Length		Surface
Direction	ft	m	Surface
7/25	4,607	1,404	Asphalt
16/34	1,710	521	Turf

Statistics (2008)
- Aircraft operations: 4,700
- Source: Federal Aviation Administration

Liberty County Airport (ICAO: KLTY, FAA LID: LTY, formerly 4U3) is a county-owned airport a mile west of Chester, in Liberty County, Montana.

Most U.S. airports use the same three-letter location identifier for the FAA and IATA, but this airport is LTY to the FAA and has no IATA code.

== Facilities ==
The airport covers 279 acres (113 ha) and has two runways: 7/25 is 4,607 x 75 ft (1,404 x 23 m) asphalt and 16/34 is 1,710 x 60 ft (521 x 18 m) turf. In the year ending August 24, 2008 the airport had 4,700 general aviation aircraft operations, average 12 per day.

== See also ==
- List of airports in Montana
