= Lothair, Montana =

- Unincorporated community
- Location within Montana Location within the United States
- Coordinates: 48°28′18″N 111°13′56″W
- Country: United States
- State: Montana
- County: Liberty
- Elevation: 3,320 ft (1,010 m)
- Time zone: UTC-7 (Mountain (MST))
  - Summer (DST): UTC-6 (MDT)
- ZIP code: 59461
- Area code: 406
- GNIS feature ID: 773709

Lothair is an unincorporated community in Liberty County, Montana, United States. Lothair is located on U.S. Route 2 and the Hi-Line, 12.5 miles (20.1 km) west of Chester. The community had a post office until December 17, 2005; it still has its own ZIP code, 59461.

Originally a station on the Great Northern Railway, Lothair became a town in 1910.
