= Riverview Colony, Montana =

- Census-designated place
- Location within Montana Location within the United States
- Coordinates: 48°10′56″N 111°01′58″W
- Country: United States
- State: Montana
- County: Liberty

Area
  - Total: 0.90 sq mi (2.34 km^{2})
  - Land: 0.90 sq mi (2.34 km^{2})
  - Water: 0 sq mi (0.00 km^{2})
- Elevation: 3,133 ft (955 m)

Population (2020)
  - Total: 100
  - Density: 110.5/sq mi (42.66/km^{2})
- Time zone: UTC-7 (Mountain (MST))
  - Summer (DST): UTC-6 (MDT)
- ZIP Code: 59522 (Chester)
- Area code: 406
- FIPS code: 30-63266
- GNIS feature ID: 2804308

Riverview Colony is a Hutterite community and census-designated place (CDP) in Liberty County, Montana, United States. It is in the southern part of the county, 29 miles (47 km) south of Chester, the county seat.

As of the 2020 census, Riverview Colony had a population of 100.

The community was first listed as a CDP prior to the 2020 census.

== Demographics ==
Historical population
Census	Pop.	Note	%±
2020	100		—
U.S. Decennial Census
