= Eagle Creek Colony, Montana =

- Census-designated place
- Location within Montana Location within the United States
- Coordinates: 48°42′08″N 111°12′11″W
- Country: United States
- State: Montana
- County: Liberty

Area
  - Total: 0.40 sq mi (1.04 km^{2})
  - Land: 0.40 sq mi (1.04 km^{2})
  - Water: 0 sq mi (0.00 km^{2})
- Elevation: 3,599 ft (1,097 m)

Population (2020)
  - Total: 164
  - Density: 410.0/sq mi (158.32/km^{2})
- Time zone: UTC-7 (Mountain (MST))
  - Summer (DST): UTC-6 (MDT)
- ZIP Code: 59444 (Galata)
- Area code: 406
- FIPS code: 30-22655
- GNIS feature ID: 2804307

Eagle Creek Colony is a Hutterite community and census-designated place (CDP) in Liberty County, Montana, United States. It is in the northwest part of the county, 20 miles (32 km) northwest of Chester, the county seat. As of the 2020 census, Eagle Creek Colony had a population of 164.

The community was first listed as a CDP prior to the 2020 census.

== Demographics ==
Historical population
Census	Pop.	Note	%±
2020	164		—
U.S. Decennial Census
