= Bourne Coulee =

Coordinates: 48.68472°N 111.04247°W

Location of Bourne Coulee in United States.

Bourne Coulee is a river in Liberty County, Montana, United States.
