= Sage Creek Colony, Montana =

- Census-designated place
- Location within Montana Location within the United States
- Coordinates: 48°55′44″N 110°58′20″W
- Country: United States
- State: Montana
- County: Liberty

Area
  - Total: 0.24 sq mi (0.61 km^{2})
  - Land: 0.24 sq mi (0.61 km^{2})
  - Water: 0 sq mi (0.00 km^{2})
- Elevation: 3,458 ft (1,054 m)

Population (2020)
  - Total: 81
  - Density: 343.5/sq mi (132.63/km^{2})
- Time zone: UTC-7 (Mountain (MST))
  - Summer (DST): UTC-6 (MDT)
- ZIP Code: 59522 (Chester)
- Area code: 406
- FIPS code: 30-65160
- GNIS feature ID: 2804309

Sage Creek Colony is a Hutterite community and census-designated place (CDP) in Liberty County, Montana, United States. As of the 2020 census, Sage Creek Colony had a population of 81. It is in the northern part of the county, 33 miles (53 km) north of Chester, the county seat, and 5 miles (8 km) south of the Canadian border.

The community was first listed as a CDP prior to the 2020 census.

== Demographics ==
Historical population
Census	Pop.	Note	%±
2020	81		—
U.S. Decennial Census
