= Joplin, Montana =

- Unincorporated community
- Location within Liberty County and Montana
- Coordinates: 48°33′33″N 110°46′22″W
- Country: United States
- State: Montana
- County: Liberty

Area
  - Total: 1.29 sq mi (3.34 km^{2})
  - Land: 1.26 sq mi (3.27 km^{2})
  - Water: 0.027 sq mi (0.07 km^{2})
- Elevation: 3,317 ft (1,011 m)

Population (2020)
  - Total: 159
  - Density: 125.9/sq mi (48.62/km^{2})
- Time zone: UTC-7 (Mountain (MST))
  - Summer (DST): UTC-6 (MDT)
- ZIP code: 59531
- Area code: 406
- FIPS code: 30-39775
- GNIS ID: 2408452

Joplin is an unincorporated community and census-designated place (CDP) in Liberty County, Montana, United States. As of the 2020 census, Joplin had a population of 159.

== History ==
Joplin was founded in 1910 by Lebanese immigrant Joseph E. Rehal, who was its first postmaster. It was a station house on the Great Northern Railway as early as 1902.

=== Train derailment ===
On September 25, 2021, at approximately 3:55 p.m., Amtrak passenger train 7/27, also known as the westbound Empire Builder, suffered a derailment 1 mile (1.6 km) west of Joplin while en route from Chicago to Seattle. Three people were killed and 50 more were injured when the eight rear cars of the ten-car train derailed.

== Geography ==
Joplin is located on the eastern edge of Liberty County. It is bordered to the east by Inverness in Hill County. U.S. Route 2 runs along the southern edge of Joplin, leading west 10 miles (16 km) to Chester, the Liberty county seat, and east 50 miles (80 km) to Havre.

According to the United States Census Bureau, the Joplin CDP has a total area of 1.3 square miles (3.3 km^{2}), of which 0.03 square miles (0.07 km^{2}), or 2.20%, are water.

=== Climate ===
Climate data for Joplin, Montana (1991–2020 normals, extremes 1932–1938, 1947–present)
Month	Jan	Feb	Mar	Apr	May	Jun	Jul	Aug	Sep	Oct	Nov	Dec	Year
Record high °F (°C)	66 (19)	72 (22)	78 (26)	88 (31)	95 (35)	103 (39)	106 (41)	106 (41)	99 (37)	88 (31)	76 (24)	65 (18)	106 (41)
Mean maximum °F (°C)	50.8 (10.4)	52.9 (11.6)	64.1 (17.8)	75.2 (24.0)	84.5 (29.2)	90.0 (32.2)	96.0 (35.6)	96.1 (35.6)	90.1 (32.3)	78.3 (25.7)	61.9 (16.6)	50.9 (10.5)	98.1 (36.7)
Mean daily maximum °F (°C)	29.4 (−1.4)	32.8 (0.4)	43.2 (6.2)	55.4 (13.0)	65.5 (18.6)	73.3 (22.9)	83.5 (28.6)	82.4 (28.0)	71.1 (21.7)	56.0 (13.3)	40.7 (4.8)	30.6 (−0.8)	55.3 (12.9)
Daily mean °F (°C)	18.6 (−7.4)	21.4 (−5.9)	31.1 (−0.5)	42.0 (5.6)	51.9 (11.1)	59.7 (15.4)	67.6 (19.8)	66.4 (19.1)	56.1 (13.4)	42.9 (6.1)	29.8 (−1.2)	20.4 (−6.4)	42.3 (5.7)
Mean daily minimum °F (°C)	7.8 (−13.4)	10.1 (−12.2)	18.9 (−7.3)	28.6 (−1.9)	38.3 (3.5)	46.0 (7.8)	51.6 (10.9)	50.3 (10.2)	41.1 (5.1)	29.8 (−1.2)	18.9 (−7.3)	10.2 (−12.1)	29.3 (−1.5)
Mean minimum °F (°C)	−19.5 (−28.6)	−14.0 (−25.6)	−4.2 (−20.1)	15.2 (−9.3)	25.7 (−3.5)	35.6 (2.0)	42.5 (5.8)	39.5 (4.2)	28.3 (−2.1)	11.6 (−11.3)	−3.7 (−19.8)	−13.9 (−25.5)	−27.9 (−33.3)
Record low °F (°C)	−42 (−41)	−43 (−42)	−26 (−32)	−11 (−24)	9 (−13)	26 (−3)	32 (0)	28 (−2)	9 (−13)	−14 (−26)	−25 (−32)	−48 (−44)	−48 (−44)
Average precipitation inches (mm)	0.36 (9.1)	0.28 (7.1)	0.34 (8.6)	0.82 (21)	1.59 (40)	2.47 (63)	1.34 (34)	1.05 (27)	1.06 (27)	0.65 (17)	0.50 (13)	0.30 (7.6)	10.76 (273)
Average snowfall inches (cm)	8.0 (20)	5.4 (14)	4.4 (11)	3.0 (7.6)	0.4 (1.0)	0.2 (0.51)	0.0 (0.0)	0.0 (0.0)	0.0 (0.0)	2.4 (6.1)	5.3 (13)	6.2 (16)	35.3 (90)
Average precipitation days (≥ 0.01 in)	4.6	4.2	4.5	5.2	8.1	10.3	5.6	5.5	5.0	4.8	4.2	4.1	66.1
Average snowy days (≥ 0.1 in)	3.2	3.2	2.2	1.3	0.2	0.0	0.0	0.0	0.0	1.0	2.1	2.8	16.0
Source: NOAA

== Demographics ==
Historical population
Census	Pop.	Note	%±
2020	159		—
U.S. Decennial Census

For statistical purposes, the United States Census Bureau has defined this community as a census-designated place (CDP).

As of the census of 2000, there were 210 people, 91 households, and 66 families residing in the CDP. The population density was 166.6 inhabitants per square mile (64.3/km^{2}). There were 105 housing units at an average density of 83.3 per square mile (32.2/km^{2}). The racial makeup of the CDP was 99.52% White, 0.48% from other races. Hispanic, or Latino of any race were 1.90% of the population.

There were 91 households, out of which 22.0% had children under the age of 18 living with them, 64.8% were married couples living together, 7.7% had a female householder with no husband present, and 26.4% were non-families. 24.2% of all households were made up of individuals, and 13.2% had someone living alone who was 65 years of age or older. The average household size was 2.31, and the average family size was 2.70.

In the CDP, the population was spread out, with 22.4% under the age of 18, 5.7% from 18 to 24, 23.8% from 25 to 44, 25.2% from 45 to 64, and 22.9% who were 65 years of age or older. The median age was 43 years. For every 100 females, there were 110.0 males. For every 100 females age 18 and over, there were 96.4 males.

The median income for a household in the CDP was $38,281, and the median income for a family was $40,625. Males had a median income of $28,750 versus $17,500 for females. The per capita income for the CDP was $24,014. About 4.6% of families and 4.4% of the population were below the poverty line, including none of those under the age of 18 and 5.6% of those 65 or over.

== Education ==
The former Joplin School was closed in 2005 when the consolidated Chester-Joplin-Inverness public school district was formed. The school district serves students from Kindergarten to 12th grade.

Joplin Schools consolidated with Inverness, MT in the early 1980s to form J-I school before it consolidated with the Chester School District. The 1974 graduating class was 18 students.

== Notable people ==
- Joseph E. Rehal - founder of Joplin, Montana
