= Burlington Northern Railroad =

Former American railroad company

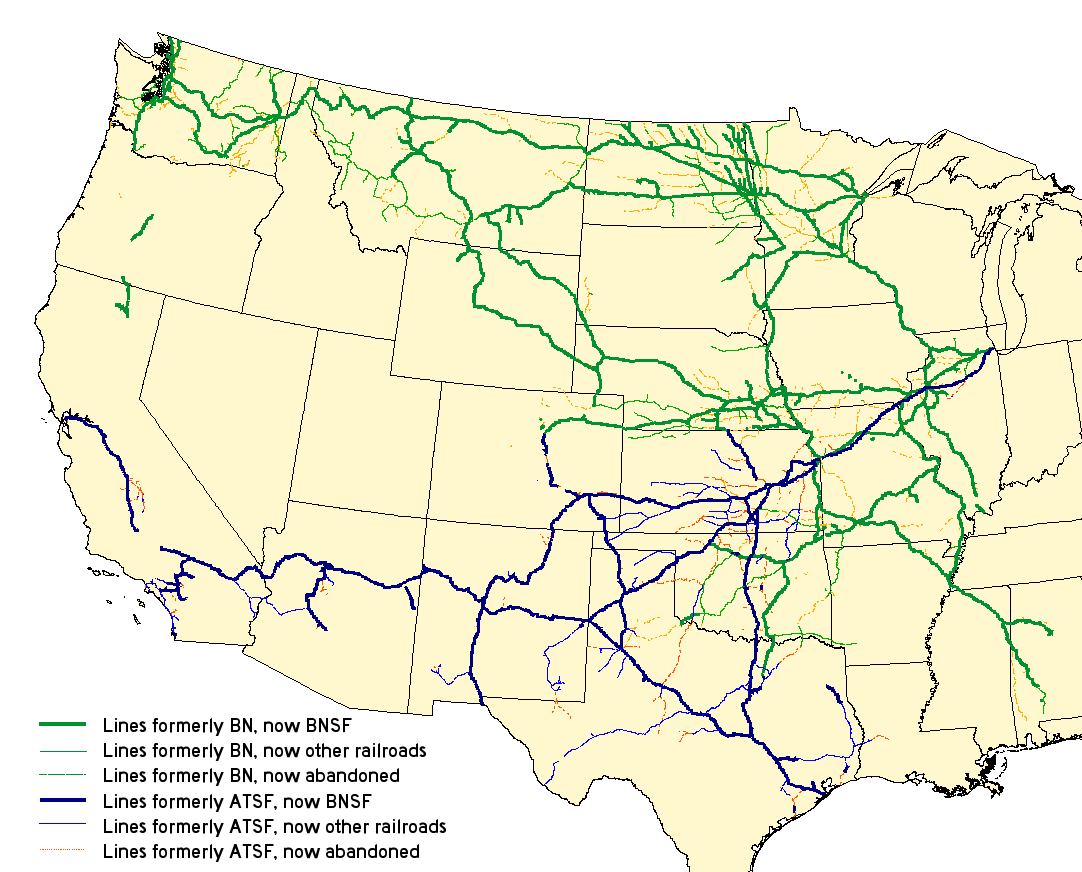
- Burlington Northern Railroad trackage (shown in green) at the time of the merger with the ATSF.

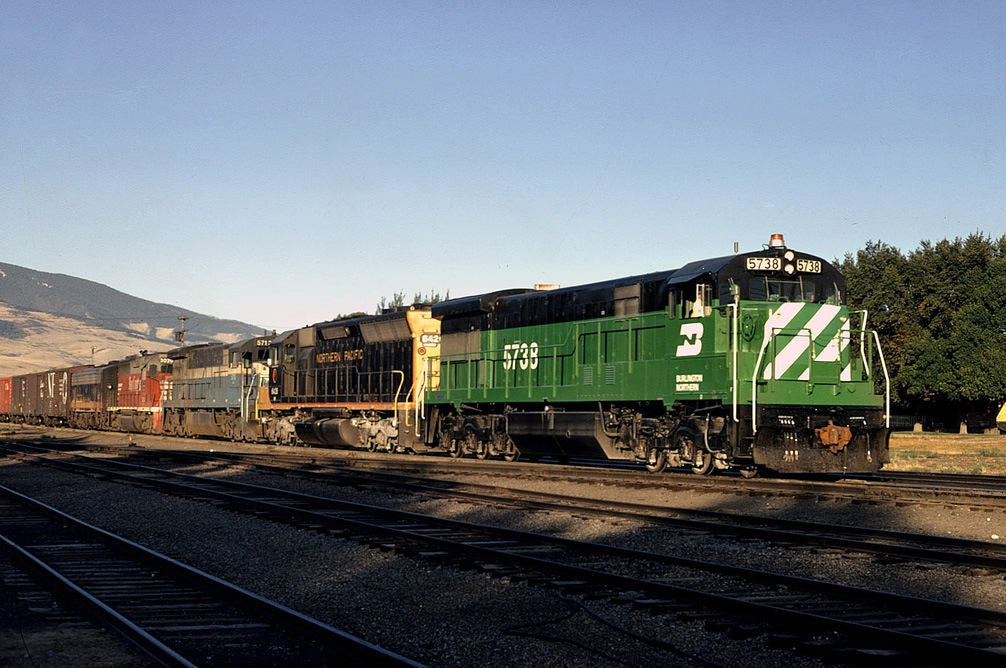
- With three of four predecessor railroad locomotives in a five-unit consist, BN 5738, a GE U33C, departs Livingston, Montana in August 1971.

Overview
- Headquarters: Saint Paul, Minnesota (1970–1981); Seattle, Washington (1981–1988); Fort Worth, Texas (1988–1996)
- Reporting mark: BN
- Locale: Pacific Northwest, Midwestern United States, Central United States
- Dates of operation: March 2, 1970–December 31, 1996
- Predecessor: Great Northern Railway; Northern Pacific Railway; Spokane, Portland and Seattle Railway; Chicago, Burlington and Quincy Railroad (all merged by March 2, 1970); St. Louis-San Francisco Railway (merged 1980); Colorado and Southern Railway (merged 1981); Fort Worth and Denver Railway (merged 1982)
- Successor: BNSF Railway

Technical
- Track gauge: 4 ft 8 1/2 in (1,435 mm) standard gauge
- Length: 27,000 miles (43,000 km)

The Burlington Northern Railroad (reporting mark BN) was an American–based Class 1 railroad company formed from a merger of four major U.S. railroads. Burlington Northern operated between March 2, 1970 and December 31, 1996.

Its historical lineage begins in the earliest days of railroading with the chartering in 1848 of the Chicago and Aurora Railroad, a direct ancestor line of the Chicago, Burlington and Quincy Railroad, which lends Burlington, from Burlington, Iowa, to the names of various merger-produced successors.

Burlington Northern acquired the Atchison, Topeka and Santa Fe Railway on December 31, 1996, to form the Burlington Northern and Santa Fe Railway (later renamed BNSF Railway), which was owned by the Burlington Northern Santa Fe Corporation. That corporation was purchased in 2009 by Berkshire Hathaway, which is controlled by investor Warren Buffett.

== History ==
The Burlington Northern Railroad was the product of the merger of four major railroads: the Great Northern Railway (GN), the Northern Pacific Railway (NP), the Spokane, Portland and Seattle Railway (SP&S) and the Chicago, Burlington and Quincy Railroad (CB&Q).

The four railroads shared a very intertwined history, due to the efforts of James J. Hill, the railroad tycoon who had founded the Great Northern Railway. Hill purchased an interest in the Northern Pacific in 1896 as the railway endured a period of financial turmoil. Hill attempted to merge the two railways but was rebuffed by the leaders of the Northern Pacific.

In 1901, the two railways teamed up to purchase nearly all shares of the Chicago, Burlington and Quincy Railroad, giving both a needed connection to Chicago, the nation's railroad hub. That same year, came the next attempt to merge the railroads with the establishment of the Northern Securities Company, a trust that controlled all three, with Hill serving as president. The company was sued in 1902 under the Sherman Antitrust Act and in 1904 the Justice Department won in the Supreme Court ruling Northern Securities Co. v. United States.

Although the ruling forced the three companies to be operated independently, they were still closely linked, even sharing a headquarters building, the Railroad and Bank Building in Saint Paul, Minnesota. In 1905, the Spokane, Portland and Seattle Railway was founded. Like the Chicago, Burlington and Quincy Railroad, this new railroad was co-owned by the Great Northern and Northern Pacific and allowed both to access Portland via the Columbia River Gorge. Leaders attempted to merge another two times, in 1927 and 1955, but were unsuccessful.

The four railroads were finally cleared to merge on March 2, 1970, after a legal challenge that once again went to the Supreme Court. By that time, the GN's president was John M. Budd, the NP's president was Louis W. Menk, and the CB&Q's president was William John Quinn. Under the leadership of Budd and Menk, the newly established holding company, Burlington Northern, Inc. purchased the four railroads and merged them into the Burlington Northern Railroad. Budd became the company's first board chairman and CEO while Menk became the company's first president and COO.

To further expand the Burlington Northern, a single track was constructed in 1972 into the Powder River Basin to serve various coal mines. The expansion was a source of traffic unprecedented in United States railroad history. In 1971, the first full year for the new railroad, trains carried 64,116 million revenue ton-miles of freight, by 1979 the total was 135,004 million. Most of the increase was attributed to Powder River coal from Wyoming.

The Burlington Northern, along with handling freight trains, briefly operated inter-city passenger trains. The BN had started operations just a matter of weeks before the end of service of the original California Zephyr, which had been operated by the CB&Q, in conjunction with the Denver and Rio Grande Western and Western Pacific railroads, and continued to operate the North Coast Limited, Mainstreeter, Empire Builder, Western Star, Denver Zephyr, "Gopher", and "International", until Amtrak took over intercity passenger service in May 1971, thus becoming the last "new" Class I railroad to operate its own passenger trains. The BN also operated a commuter line inherited from the CB&Q from Aurora, Illinois to Chicago Union Station. This line is still owned and operated to this day by the BNSF Railway under a purchase-of-service agreement with Metra.

In May 1980 when Mount St. Helens erupted, the BN owned the land around the summit of Mount St. Helens in Washington state. In the 19th century, the United States government distributed land to railroads as a way to open up the American West and the 9,677-foot (2,950 m) peak was granted to the Northern Pacific. It was inherited in the 1970 merger by Burlington Northern. Following the eruption the land including the volcano was subsequently transferred in a land swap between the railroad and the United States Forest Service so the Mount St. Helens National Volcanic Monument could be established.

On November 21, 1980, the St. Louis–San Francisco Railway was acquired, giving the railroad trackage as far south as Florida.

In the early 1980s, two independently operated railroads, owned by Burlington Northern Inc. were absorbed into the Burlington Northern Railroad; the Colorado and Southern Railway was absorbed in 1981, followed by the Fort Worth and Denver Railway in 1982.

The railroad relocated its headquarters from Saint Paul to Seattle, Washington in 1981, as well as its parent company and sister companies.

The railroad made significant investments in establishing unit trains for transportation of grain in the 1980s. In 1982, grain traffic made up 13 percent of the railroad's freight. Unit trains allowed the company to more efficiently use its equipment and reduce its operating expenses.

All of Burlington Northern, Inc's non-rail operations were spun off to a new company, Burlington Resources in 1988.

The railroad once again relocated its headquarters in 1988, moving from Seattle to Fort Worth, Texas.

On September 22, 1995, the Atchison, Topeka and Santa Fe Railway merged with the Burlington Northern to create the Burlington Northern Santa Fe Railway. However, the merger was not official until December 31, 1996, when a common dispatching system was established, Santa Fe's non-union dispatchers were unionized and the implementation of Santa Fe's train identification codes systemwide. On January 24, 2005, the railroad shortened its name to BNSF Railway.

== Route ==
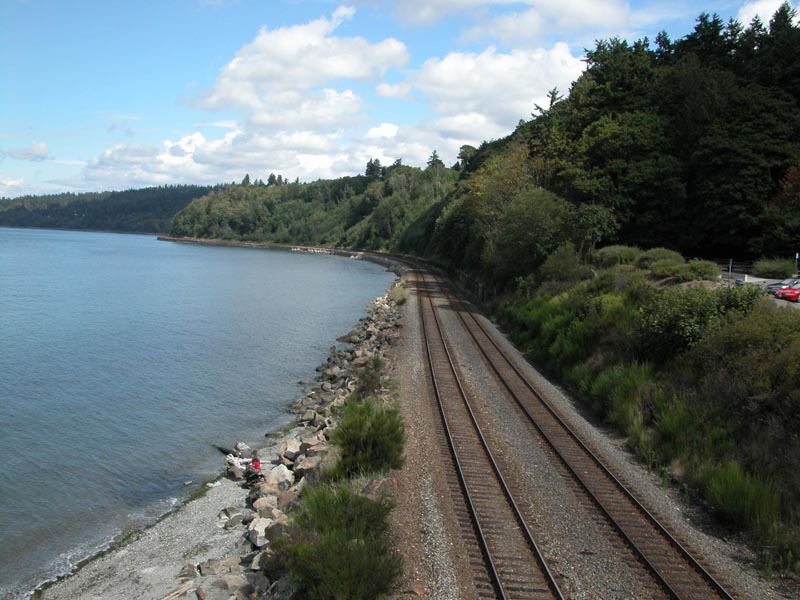
Main line heading north out of Seattle, Washington along the shore of Puget Sound

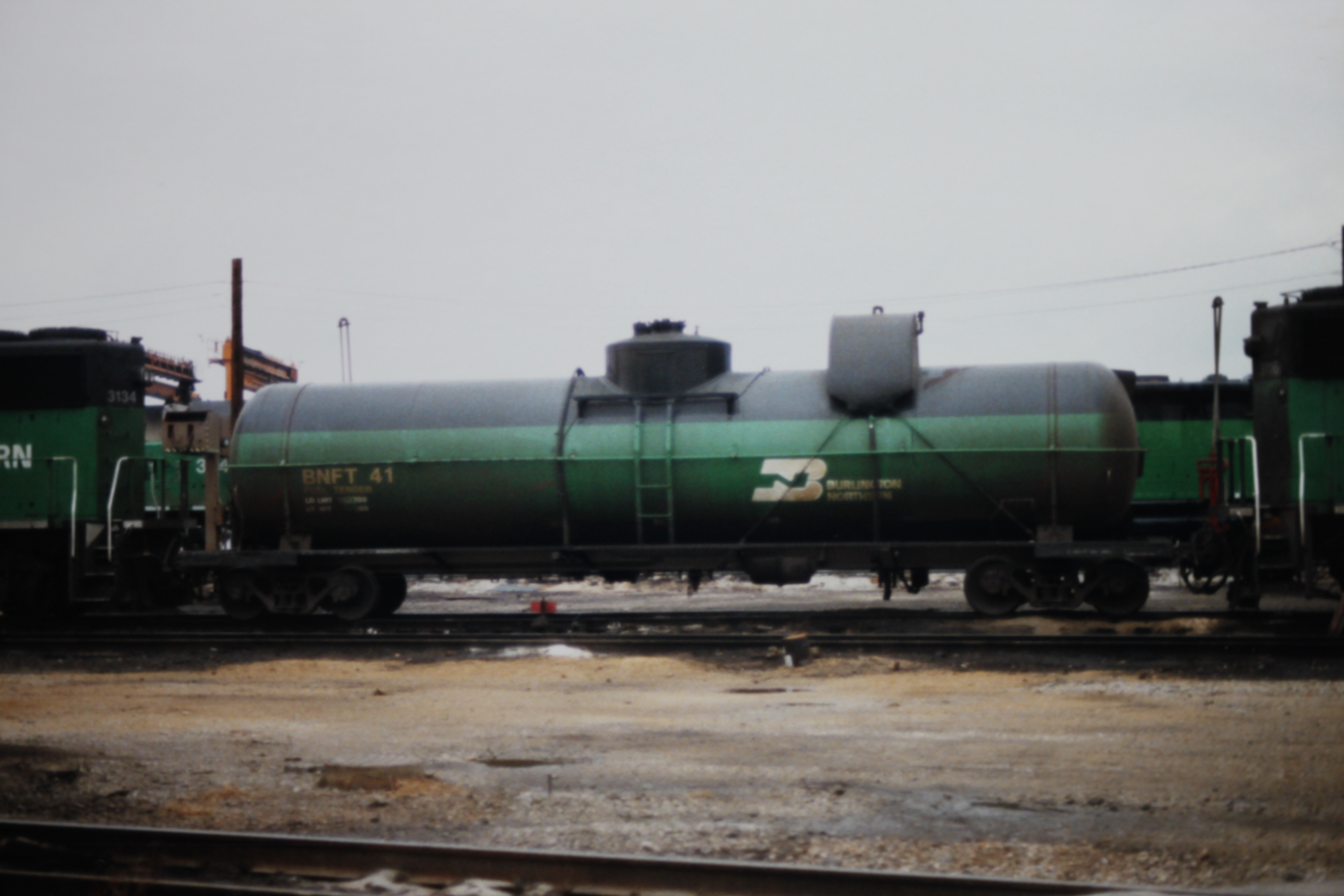
Burlington Northern used fuel tenders between specially equipped locomotives in areas that lacked service facilities. BNSF has eliminated this practice with the construction of new facilities like the Hauser Refueling Facility in Rathdrum, Idaho.

The Burlington Northern traversed the most northerly routes of any railroad in the western United States. These routes started at Chicago, Illinois and ran west-northwest to La Crosse, Wisconsin. From here the routes continued northwest through Minneapolis and St. Paul, Minnesota to Grand Forks, North Dakota. From Grand Forks the routes ran west through North Dakota, Montana, and Idaho to Spokane, Washington. The former GN routed through North Dakota/Northern Montana, crossing the continental divide at Marias Pass, while the former NP line routed through the southern part of Montana (which was spun off to Montana Rail Link in 1987), crossing the continental divide at Mullan and Homestake Passes. At Spokane the routes split into three. The former Great Northern route ran west to Wenatchee, Washington, crossed under the Cascade Range at New Cascade Tunnel on Stevens Pass, and descended to the Puget Sound region through Everett, Washington. The former Northern Pacific turned southwest towards the Tri-Cities, then northwest to Yakima, Washington, and crossed under the Cascade Range at Stampede Tunnel, descending to the Green River Valley at Auburn, Washington where it connected with existing NP lines from British Columbia to Portland, Oregon. The Spokane, Portland and Seattle ran southwest to the Tri-Cities, then followed the north bank of the Columbia River to Vancouver, Washington.

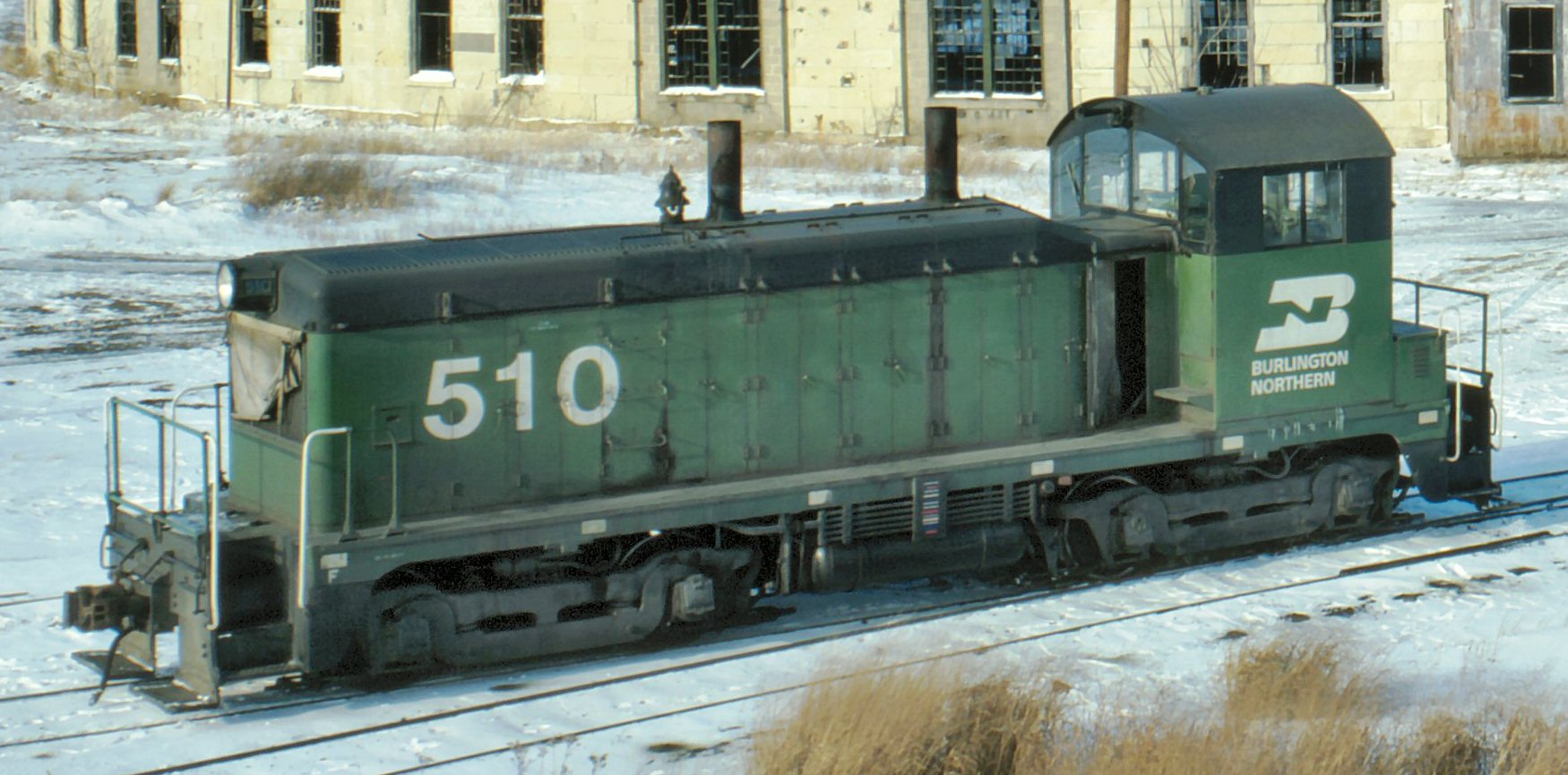
NW2 510 at Aurora, Illinois

With the acquisition of the St. Louis – San Francisco Railway the route was extended into the South Central and Southeastern United States.

Transport Statistics shows BN operated 23,609 miles of line and 34,691 miles of track at the end of 1970; it shows 4,547 SLSF miles of line not including QA&P and AT&N. At the end of 1981 BN showed 27,374 miles (44,054 km) of line and 40,041 miles (64,440 km) of track.

At the time of the 1980 eruption of Mount St. Helens, the summit of the volcano was owned by Burlington Northern. Following the eruption, Burlington Northern agreed to a land swap with the U.S. government and exchanged its square mile (2.59 square kilometer) of land on the mountain for national forest land elsewhere to allow for the creation of the Mount St. Helens National Volcanic Monument to preserve the volcano and allow for its aftermath to be scientifically studied.

== Company officers ==
=== Presidents of the Burlington Northern Railroad ===
- Louis W. Menk (1970–1971)
- Robert W. Downing (1971–1976)
- Norman Lorentzsen (1976–1981)
- Richard C. Grayson (1981–1982)
- Walter A. Drexel (1982–1985)
- Darius W. Gaskins, Jr. (1985–1989)
- Gerald Grinstein (1989–1995)
- Robert D. Krebs (1995–1996) [Post BN]

== See also ==
- Paul Bunyan Trail Rail Trail
- List of Superfund sites in Minnesota
