= Hauser Refueling Facility =

Rail yard and fueling station

The BNSF Hauser Refueling Facility is a rail yard and fueling station located near Rathdrum, Idaho, and is part of the BNSF Railway It was completed in 2004. The facility has several storage tanks and dispenses 250,000 US gallons (950,000 L) of fuel daily as of 2020. The facility also provides routine maintenance and repair services for BNSF locomotives and railcars. The facility was constructed due to the sparse network of fueling sites in the region before 2000, making it often necessary to sandwich a fuel tender between locomotives.

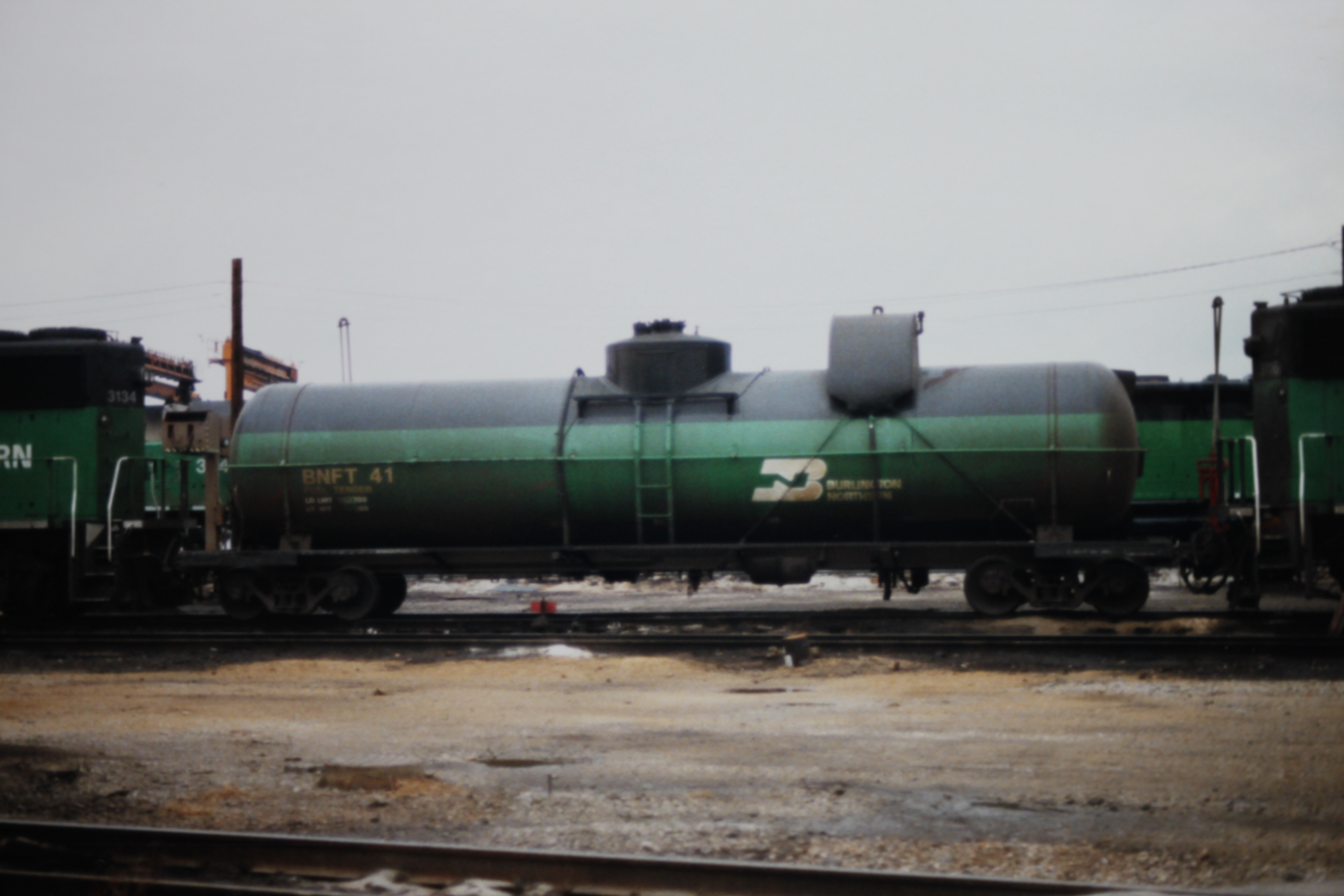
BN used fuel tenders between specially equipped locomotives in areas that lacked service facilities. BNSF has eliminated this practice with the construction of the Hauser Refueling Facility.

The facility uses various containment structures and automated fuel transit systems to prevent and contain any fuel leaks. Nonetheless, in December 2004, a wastewater spill occurred at the facility, and small amounts of petroleum-laced wastewater reached the Spokane Aquifer, the sole source of drinking water for 400,000 people in northern Idaho and northeast Washington. Preliminary tests showed no immediate threat to drinking water, but Washington state agencies formed a network to monitor the situation and push for more scrutiny of potential sources of contamination. BNSF apologized and vowed to take measures to ensure another spill won't happen.

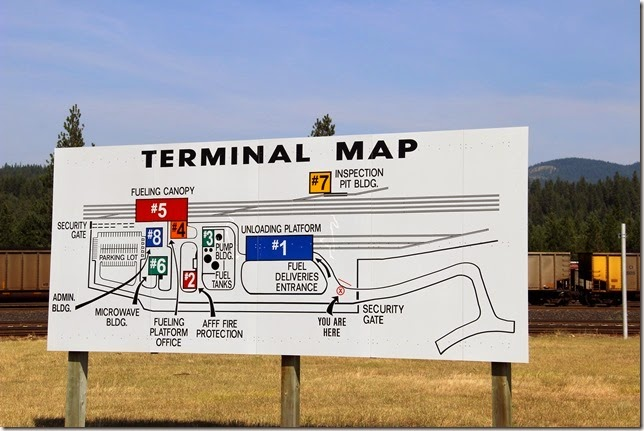
Map of the Hauser Refueling Facility

About 32 locomotives are serviced daily in a "quick-stop" process. Traffic through the facility declined during the COVID-19 pandemic, but the facility still sees heavy use and is essential to the ability of BNSF freight trains to travel the railroad's vast network in the West.

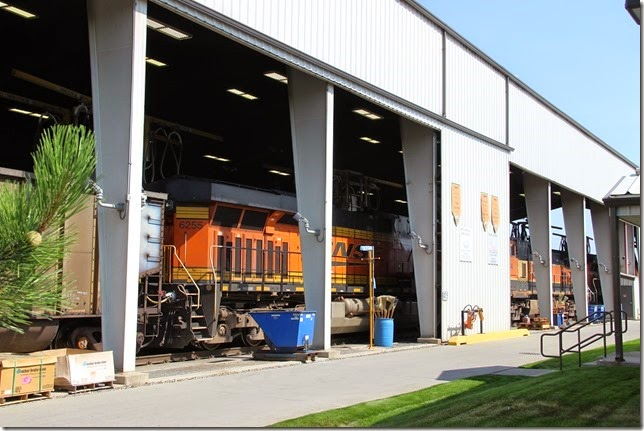
The concrete fuel pad at Hauser Refueling Facility

== See also ==
- BNSF railway
- Burlington Northern railway
- Hauser, ID
- Rathdrum, ID
