= Oriental Limited =

Former passenger train operating between Chicago and Seattle

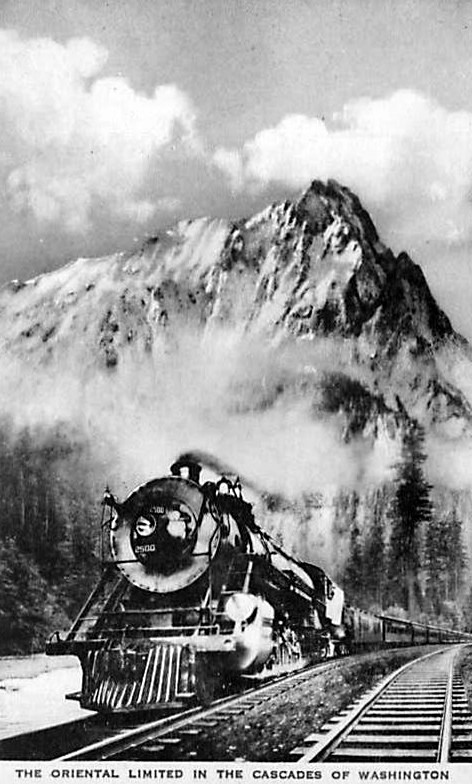
- Oriental Limited in the Cascade range in Washington state

Overview
- Service type: Passenger
- Status: Defunct
- First service: 1905 (first version); 1946 (second version)
- Last service: 1931 (first version); 1951 (second version, renamed as Western Star)
- Successor: Western Star; Empire Builder
- Current operators: Great Northern Railway and Chicago, Burlington and Quincy Railroad

Route
- Termini: Chicago; Seattle

The Oriental Limited was a named passenger train that ran between Chicago, Illinois and Seattle, Washington. The train was operated by the Great Northern Railway between St. Paul, Minnesota and Seattle, Washington, and by the Chicago, Burlington and Quincy Railroad between St. Paul and Chicago. The train's name was intended to be evocative of travel to the Far East and Japan, since trans-Pacific Great Northern steamships once connected with the railway's trains in Seattle.

The Oriental Limited name was in use by December 1905 as a St. Paul–Seattle train; the route was extended to Chicago in 1909. A new Pullman-equipped train debuted in June 1924 powered by an oil-burning steamer with electric power utilized in western Washington.

It was the premiere train on its route until 1929 when the Empire Builder started. The Oriental Limited name disappeared in 1931, and during the Great Depression and beyond the Great Northern operated only one through train between Chicago and the coast. The Oriental Limited name returned in 1946, when the railroad's secondary through train was resumed, but that train became the Western Star in 1951.
