= Lake Elwell =

- Location within Montana Location within the United States
- Location: Liberty / Toole counties, Montana, United States
- Coordinates: 48°19′20″N 111°05′48″W
- Type: reservoir
- Primary inflows: Marias River
- Primary outflows: Marias River
- Basin countries: United States
- Surface area: 14,842 acres (60.06 km^{2})
- Surface elevation: 3,025 ft (922 m)

Lake Elwell (a.k.a. Tiber Reservoir) is a reservoir in north central Montana. The reservoir was created by the damming of the Marias River at the Tiber Dam. Lake Elwell was named for Judge Charles B. Elwell (1888–1974), former director of the Montana Reclamation Association.

== See also ==
- List of lakes in Montana
- List of lakes in Liberty County, Montana
