= Marias River Bridge =

- U.S. National Register of Historic Places
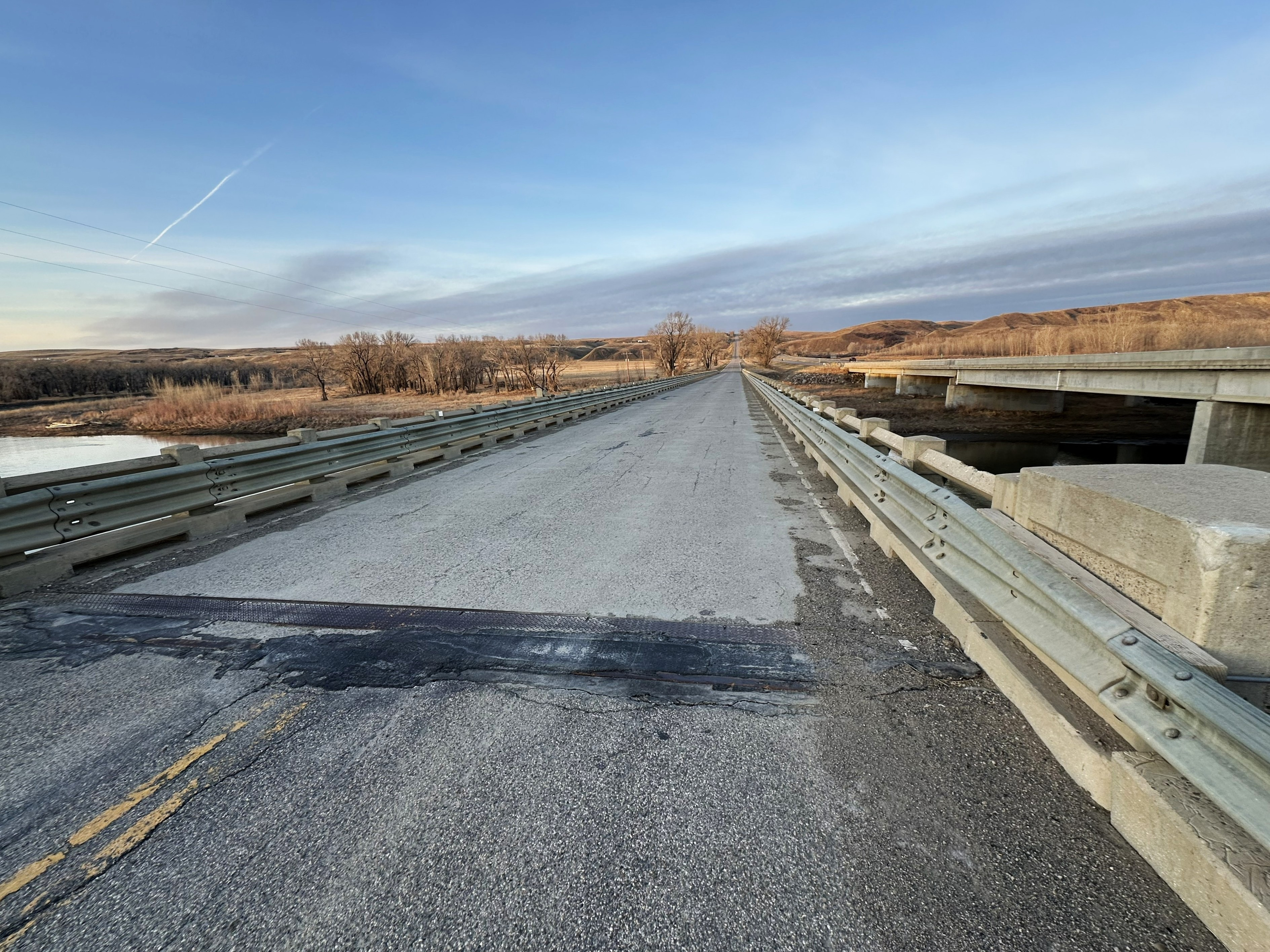

- Location within Montana Location within the United States
- Location: Mile 6, Marias Valley Rd. near Shelby in Toole County, Montana
- Coordinates: 48.427307°N 111.890624°W
- MPS: Montana's Steel Stringer and Steel Girder Bridges Multiple Property Submission
- NRHP reference No.: 12000173
- Added to NRHP: March 26, 2012

The Marias River Bridge spans the Marias River near Shelby in Toole County, Montana. It was listed on the National Register of Historic Places in 2012.

Montana's Department of Transportation is responsible for the bridge.
