= Western Star (train) =

Train operated by the Great Northern Railway

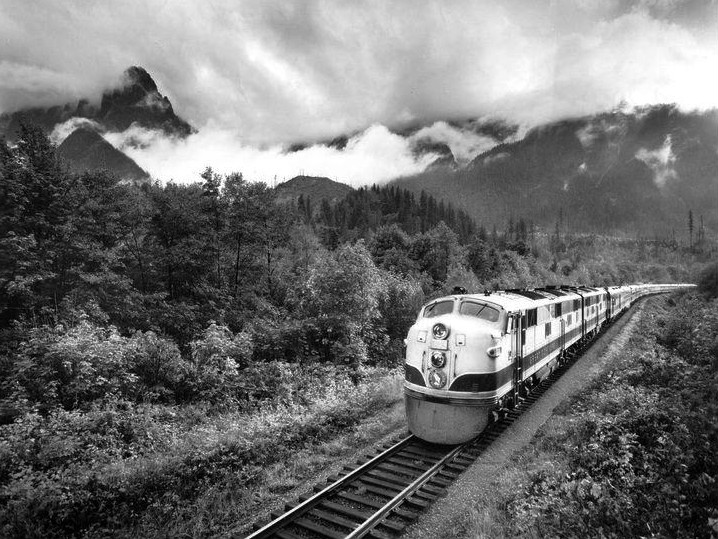
- Western Star in the Cascades, 1951

Overview
- Status: Discontinued
- Predecessor: Oriental Limited
- First service: June 3, 1951
- Last service: May 1, 1971
- Successor: Empire Builder
- Former operators: Chicago, Burlington and Quincy Railroad; Great Northern Railway; Spokane, Portland and Seattle Railway; Burlington Northern Railroad

Route
- Termini: Chicago, Illinois; Seattle, Washington/Portland, Oregon

The Western Star was a named passenger train operated by the Great Northern Railway between Chicago and the Pacific Northwest via Minneapolis/St. Paul, Minnesota. Between Chicago and St. Paul the train used the route of the Chicago, Burlington and Quincy Railroad; in later years eastbound passengers were accommodated on Burlington trains east of St. Paul. Through cars from the train operated between Spokane, Washington and Portland, Oregon via the Spokane, Portland and Seattle Railway. It operated from 1951 to 1971.

== History ==
The Western Star was inaugurated on June 3, 1951, replacing the Oriental Limited as the secondary train along the Great Northern's transcontinental route. The Great Northern's primary train was the famed Empire Builder, which made the run in 45 hours. The Western Star required a more leisurely 58 hours, making more intermediate stops and serving branches the Empire Builder bypassed, such as Grand Forks, North Dakota and Great Falls, Montana. The Star used equipment from the Empire Builder, which had been completely reequipped.

On March 7, 1966, the westbound Star crashed head-on with the eastbound Empire Builder at Buelow, 5 miles (8.0 km) east of Chester, Montana, while Great Northern's then-president John M. Budd rode along in the Empire. The engineers of each train died and 79 were hurt with 29 of those having to be hospitalized. The accident became known as the Great Northern Buelow wreck.

The Western Star and a connecting train between Havre and Great Falls continued operating until May 1, 1970. Amtrak did not retain the Western Star as part of its national route network and the train was discontinued, although it did re-route the Empire Builder to serve Grand Forks.

== Equipment ==
The 1951 Western Star required six sets of equipment to operate; it inherited five of these from the faster Empire Builder. Each set of equipment consisted of fourteen cars:

- Baggage-mail car
- Baggage car
- Coach (60 seats)
- Coach (48 seats)
- Coach (48 seats)
- Coach (48 seats)
- Lounge car
- Dining car
- Sleeping car
- Sleeping car
- Sleeping car
- Sleeping car
- Sleeping car
- Observation lounge

Each set could carry 330 passengers.
