= Tiber Dam =

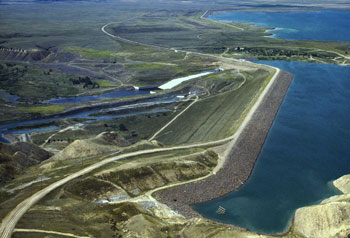

- Location within Montana
- Country: United States
- Location: Chester, Montana
- Coordinates: 48°19′19″N 111°05′52″W
- Status: Operational
- Construction began: 1952
- Opening date: 1956
- Owner: U.S. Bureau of Reclamation

Dam and spillways
- Type of dam: Embankment, zoned earth-fill
- Height: 211 ft (64 m)
- Length: 4,300 ft (1,311 m)
- Elevation at crest: 3,026 ft (922 m)
- Width (crest): 30 ft (9 m)
- Width (base): 2,500 ft (762 m)
- Dam volume: 9,800,000 cu yd (7,492,638 m^{3})
- Spillway capacity: Main: 68,467 cu ft/s (1,939 m^{3}/s); Auxiliary: 5,845 cu ft/s (166 m^{3}/s)

Reservoir
- Total capacity: 1,515,000 acre⋅ft (1.868724984×10^{9} m^{3})
- Catchment area: 4,375 sq mi (11,331 km^{2})
- Normal elevation: 2,933 ft (894 m)

The Tiber Dam is a dam on the Marias River in southern Liberty County, Montana, which forms Lake Elwell (also known as Tiber Reservoir). Construction on the dam began in 1952 and was completed in 1956. Between 1967 and 1969, a dike was added to the southern rim of the reservoir near the dam due to difficulties with the spillway settling. From 1976 to 1989, the spillway was rehabilitated. The dam is also considered one of the biggest earth-fill dams in the world, along with Fort Peck Dam.

The dam is an earth-fill type with a length of 4,300 ft (1,311 m) and height of 211 ft (64 m). The dike is 17,000 ft (5,182 m) long and 60 ft (18 m) tall. The dam's main spillway is controlled by three gates and has a maximum discharge of 68,467 cu ft/s (1,939 m^{3}/s). The dam's auxiliary spillway can release up to 5,845 cu ft/s (166 m^{3}/s) and the outlet works 1,605 cu ft/s (45 m^{3}/s).
