= Marias River =

River in the Montana, United States

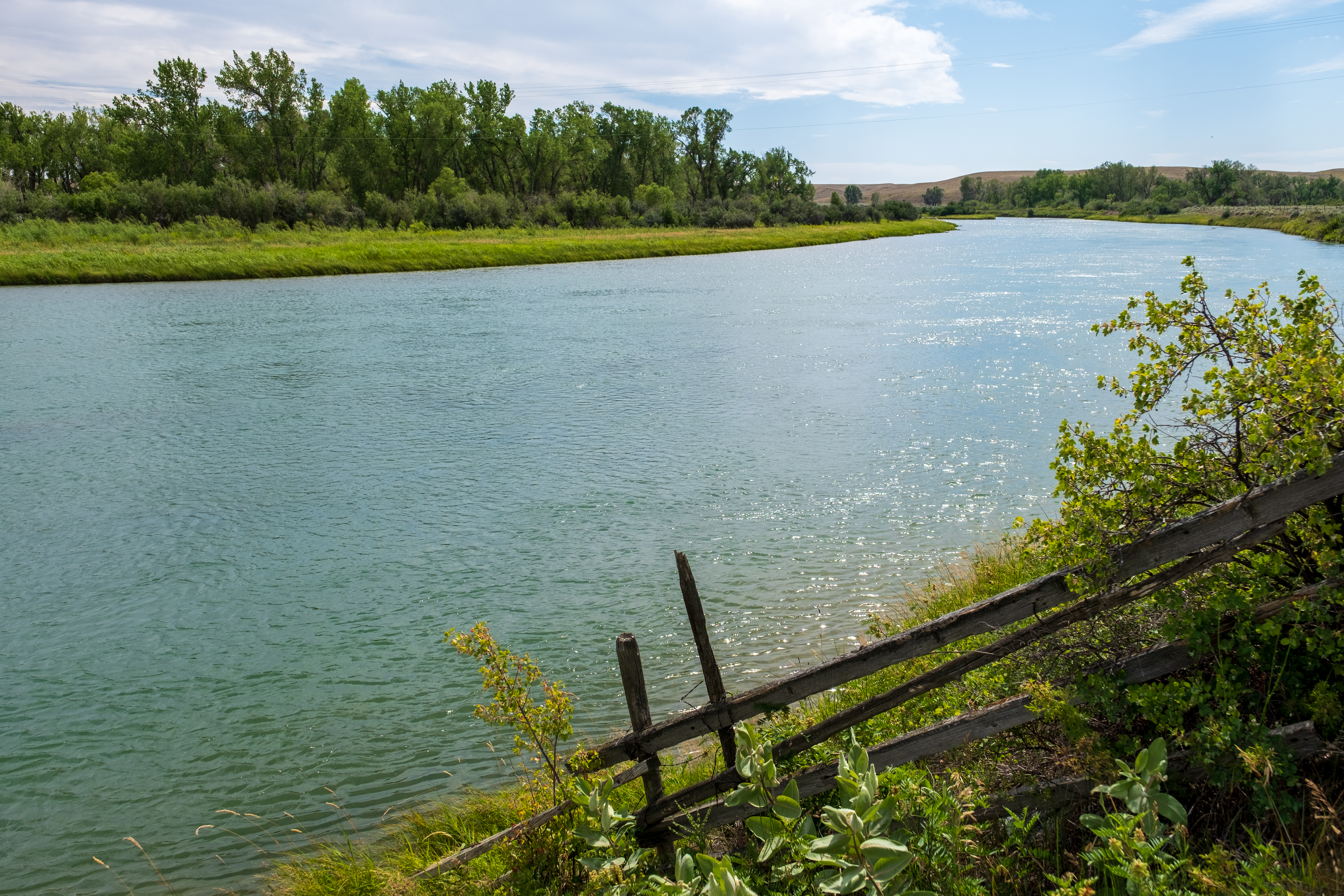
- Marias River at Moffat Bridge Recreation Area

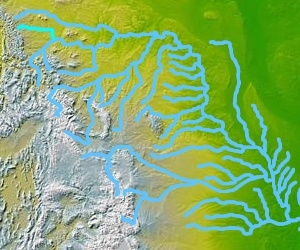
- Marias River

Location
- County: Chouteau, Hill, Liberty, Toole, Pondera and Glacier County, Montana

Physical characteristics
- Source
  - coordinates: 48°29′12″N 112°13′41″W
- Mouth
  - coordinates: 47°55′46″N 110°28′21″W
  - elevation: 2,559 feet (780 m)
- Discharge
  - location: near Loma (includes Teton River)
  - average: 1,043 cu ft/s (29.5 m^{3}/s)

Basin features
- River system: Missouri River

The Marias River is a tributary of the Missouri River, approximately 210 mi (338 km) long, in the U.S. state of Montana. It is formed in Glacier County, in northwestern Montana, by the confluence of the Cut Bank Creek and the Two Medicine River. It flows east, through Lake Elwell, formed by the Tiber Dam, then southeast, receiving the Teton River at Loma, 2 mi. (3.2 km) above its confluence with the Missouri.

The river was explored in 1805 by the Lewis and Clark Expedition. Some of the men on the expedition mistook it for the main branch of the Missouri until their subsequent discovery of the Great Falls of the Missouri near Great Falls, Montana. The river was named by Meriwether Lewis after his cousin, Maria Wood. Lewis led a small detachment of men to further explore the Marias River on the Expedition's return trip in 1806 to determine if the river ventured north above the Canada border, and he killed a young Blackfeet warrior trying to steal horses and a gun from the small detachment. In 1831 James Kipp of the American Fur Company built Fort Piegan at the mouth of the river as a trading post. In 1832 it was abandoned.

The river was the scene of the 1870 Marias Massacre.

In 1950 a flood diverted the course of the river which permanently forced it to enter the Missouri about one mile further upstream.

The Marias is a Class I river from Tiber Dam to its confluence with the Missouri River for public access for recreational purposes.

The Montana Watershed Coordination Council is an advocate for the river.

The Marias River Bridge was listed on the National Register of Historic Places in 2012.

== See also ==
- List of rivers of Montana
- Montana Stream Access Law
