= Inverness, Montana =

- CDP
- Location of Inverness, Montana
- Coordinates: 48°33′35″N 110°43′45″W
- Country: United States
- State: Montana
- County: Hill

Area
  - Total: 3.90 sq mi (10.10 km^{2})
  - Land: 3.90 sq mi (10.10 km^{2})
  - Water: 0 sq mi (0.00 km^{2})
- Elevation: 3,291 ft (1,003 m)

Population (2020)
  - Total: 77
  - Density: 19.8/sq mi (7.63/km^{2})
- Time zone: UTC-7 (Mountain (MST))
  - Summer (DST): UTC-6 (MDT)
- ZIP code: 59530
- Area code: 406
- FIPS code: 30-38725
- GNIS feature ID: 2408429

Inverness is a census-designated place (CDP) in Hill County, Montana, United States. As of the 2020 census, Inverness had a population of 77. It was named after a city in Scotland.

== Geography ==
Inverness is located about halfway between Shelby and Havre. U.S. Route 2 passes through town.

According to the United States Census Bureau, the CDP has a total area of 4.0 square miles (10 km^{2}), all land.

== Demographics ==
Historical population
| Census | Pop. | Note | %± |
|---|---|---|---|
| 2020 | 77 | | — |
U.S. Decennial Census

As of the census of 2000, there were 103 people, 40 households, and 30 families residing in the CDP. The population density was 26.1 inhabitants per square mile (10.1/km^{2}). There were 47 housing units at an average density of 11.9 per square mile (4.6/km^{2}). The racial makeup of the CDP was 99.03% White and 0.97% Native American.

There were 40 households, out of which 40.0% had children under the age of 18 living with them, 65.0% were married couples living together, 10.0% had a female householder with no husband present, and 25.0% were non-families. 25.0% of all households were made up of individuals, and 10.0% had someone living alone who was 65 years of age or older. The average household size was 2.58 and the average family size was 3.10.

In the CDP, the population was spread out, with 30.1% under the age of 18, 5.8% from 18 to 24, 30.1% from 25 to 44, 20.4% from 45 to 64, and 13.6% who were 65 years of age or older. The median age was 38 years. For every 100 females, there were 98.1 males. For every 100 females age 18 and over, there were 105.7 males.

The median income for a household in the CDP was $28,750, and the median income for a family was $33,438. Males had a median income of $25,625 versus $10,000 for females. The per capita income for the CDP was $15,594. There were 20.7% of families and 23.5% of the population living below the poverty line, including 37.8% of under eighteens and none of those over 64.

== Transportation ==
Amtrak’s Empire Builder, which operates between Seattle/Portland and Chicago, passes through the town on BNSF tracks, but makes no stop. The nearest stations are located in Havre, 47 miles (76 km) to the east, and Shelby, 56 miles (90 km) to the west.

== Education ==
It is part of the Chester-Joplin-Inverness School District.
