= John M. Budd =

American railroad executive (1907–1979)

John Marshall Budd
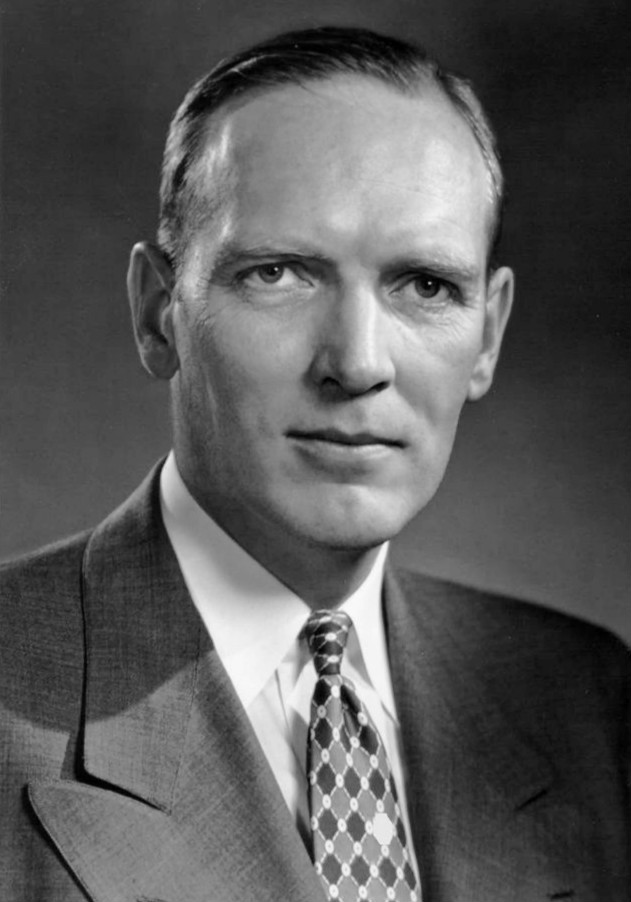
- Budd in 1966
- Born: November 2, 1907; Des Moines, Iowa, U.S.
- Died: October 25, 1979 (aged 71)
- Education: Yale University (BS)
- Spouse: Frances Bullard
- Children: John M. Budd, Jr. William B. Budd
- Parents: Ralph Budd (father); Georianna Marshall Budd (mother)

John Marshall Budd (November 2, 1907 – October 25, 1979) was an American railroad executive who was the chairman and chief executive officer of Burlington Northern Railroad from 1970 to 1971, chairman from 1971 to 1972, and a director from 1970 to 1977.

Budd was born November 2, 1907, in Des Moines, Iowa. He was the son of Ralph Budd and Georianna Marshall Budd. He married Frances Bullard on January 31, 1931. They had two children: John M. Budd, Jr., and William B. Budd. John M. Budd planned and led one of the largest railroad mergers (Burlington Northern) in the United States to 1970. This is in marked contrast with the attempted merger and subsequent bankruptcy of Penn Central Transportation between 1968 and 1970, which became the largest corporate bankruptcy in the United States to that time.

== Background ==
Budd graduated from Yale University with a Bachelor of Science in Civil Engineering in 1930.

Budd joined the Great Northern Railway on his summers away from Yale in 1925 and 1926. Following graduation, he joined the Great Northern as assistant to the electrical engineer, a position he held from 1930 to 1932. In 1933 he was appointed assistant trainmaster at Willmar, Minnesota. From 1933 to 1940 he was assistant trainmaster and then trainmaster at Sioux City, South Dakota, Wenatchee, Washington, and Spokane, Washington. From 1940 to 1942 he served as division superintendent at Klamath Falls, Oregon, then Whitefish, Montana.

In 1942 Budd was commissioned a major in the U.S. Army's Military Railway Service. He served in Algeria, Italy, France and Germany. Promoted to lieutenant colonel, he commanded the 727th Railway Operating Battalion. He was discharged in November 1945.

From November 1945, to May 1947, Budd was assistant general manager for Lines East of Williston, North Dakota, on the Great Northern. In June 1947, he joined the Chicago and Eastern Illinois Railroad as its president, a position he held until May 1949. In this capacity he was the youngest president of any U.S. Class I railroad.

He returned to the Great Northern in May 1949, following the death of Thomas F. Dixon to become the Great Northern's vice-president in charge of operations. He held this position until May 1951, when he was named president, succeeding Francis J. Gavin who had been in office since 1939. John Budd's father, Ralph Budd, another civil engineer, was president of the Great Northern from 1919 to 1930, and president of the Chicago, Burlington and Quincy Railroad, a company half-owned by the Great Northern in cooperation with the Northern Pacific Railway, from 1930 until his retirement in 1949.

In 1952, Budd was traveling in his private train car that "drifted" past a switch onto the main line. While railroad men attempted to rectify the situation, Budd's train was struck by another traveling in the opposite direction. Again in 1966, his "home on wheels" was attached to the Empire Builder when he and his wife were involved in the Great Northern Buelow wreck. He was not hurt either time though two others died in each accident.

In 1955, Budd entered discussions with Robert Stetson Macfarlane, president of the Northern Pacific, about merger of the Great Northern, Northern Pacific, and the Burlington. The companies continued to the Interstate Commerce Commission and the U.S. Supreme Court, which resulted in the creation of the Burlington Northern Railroad in March 1970.

He was a member of the American Association of Railroad Superintendents; Boy Scouts of America; and Hamline University.

Budd died on October 25, 1979, at the age of 71.
