= Chester, Montana =

- Town
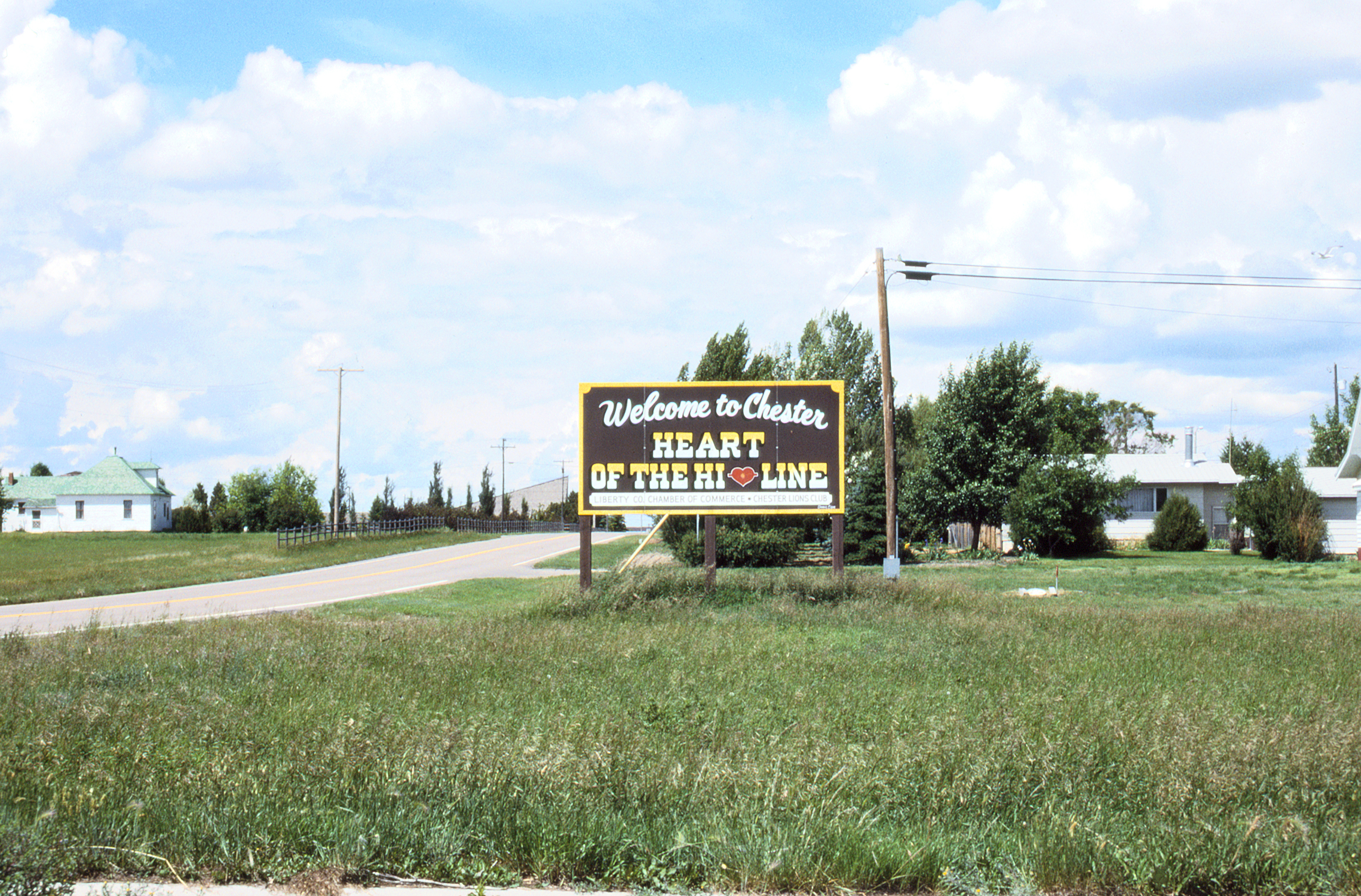
- Chester Welcome Sign

- Location of Chester, Montana
- Coordinates: 48°30′41″N 110°57′58″W
- Country: United States
- State: Montana
- County: Liberty

Government
  - Mayor: James Dahlen

Area
  - Total: 0.49 sq mi (1.26 km^{2})
  - Land: 0.49 sq mi (1.26 km^{2})
  - Water: 0 sq mi (0.00 km^{2})
- Elevation: 3,133 ft (955 m)

Population (2020)
  - Total: 847
  - Density: 1,739.1/sq mi (671.48/km^{2})
- Time zone: UTC-7 (Mountain (MST))
  - Summer (DST): UTC-6 (MDT)
- ZIP code: 59522
- Area code: 406
- FIPS code: 30-14200
- GNIS ID: 2413195
- Website: chester-montana.com

Chester is a town in and the county seat of Liberty County, Montana, United States. The population was 847 at the time of both the 2010 and 2020 U.S. census.

== History ==
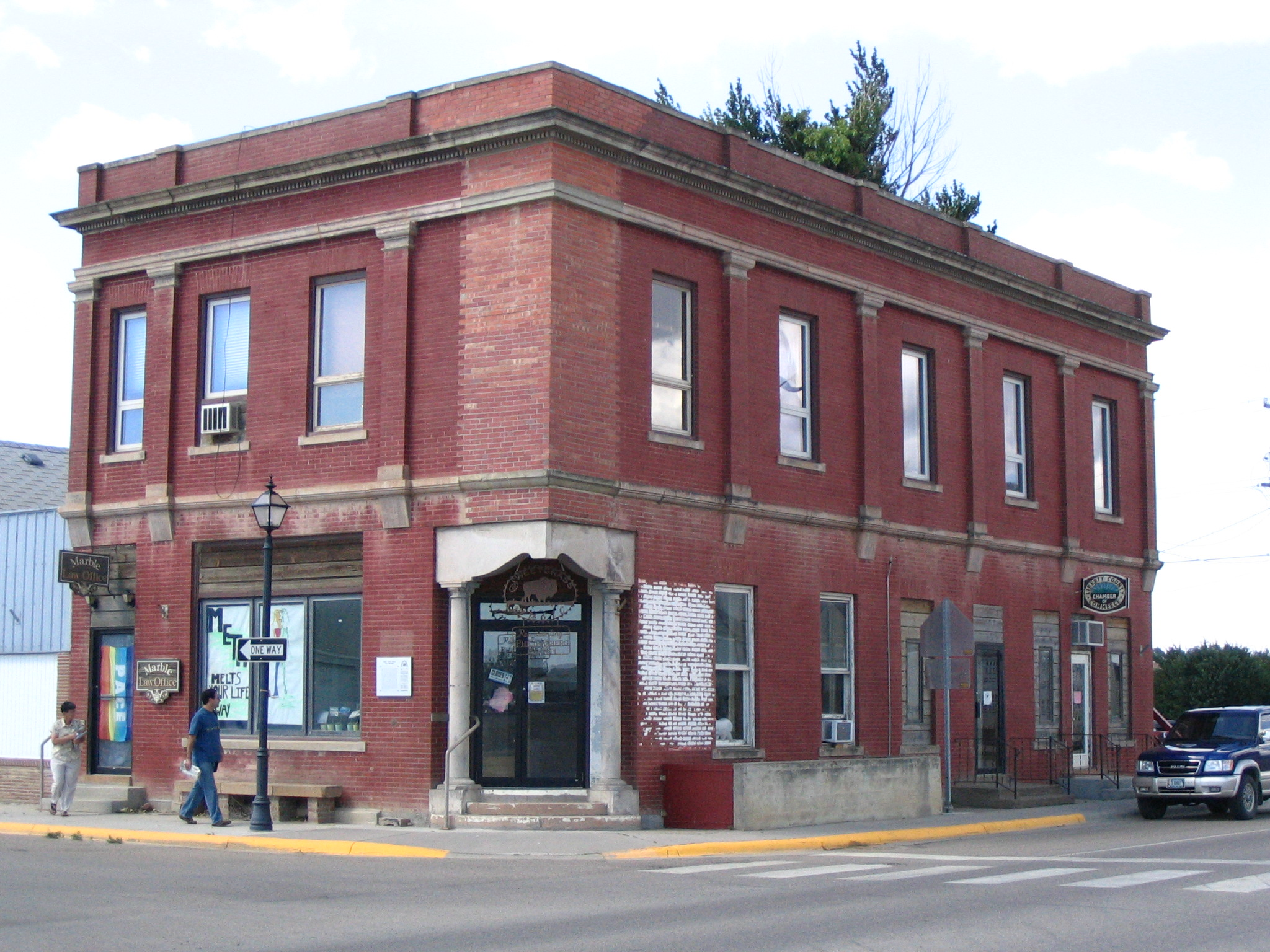
First State Bank of Chester

The Blackfoot, Piegan Blackfeet, and Blood Tribe migrated to the area via the Old North Trail in the early 18th century. The Lewis and Clark Expedition came through the area as it trekked around Lake Elwell and the Marius River in July 1806. Meriwether Lewis accounted in his journal that "there were not less than 10 thousand buffalo within a circle of 2 miles around that place". The Earl of Southesk concurred during his 1859 expedition to the area when he said that as "[f]ar as the eye could reach, these plains were covered with troops of buffalo; thousands and thousands were constantly in sight."

With gold prospectors arriving in the area and the railroad booming, the first post office was commissioned on November 22, 1895. The town was incorporated a few years later in 1910, the same year that a new railroad depot was built and a railroad signal was installed. Its namesake was chosen by the town's first telegraph operator which he chose in honor of his hometown in Pennsylvania.

== Geography ==
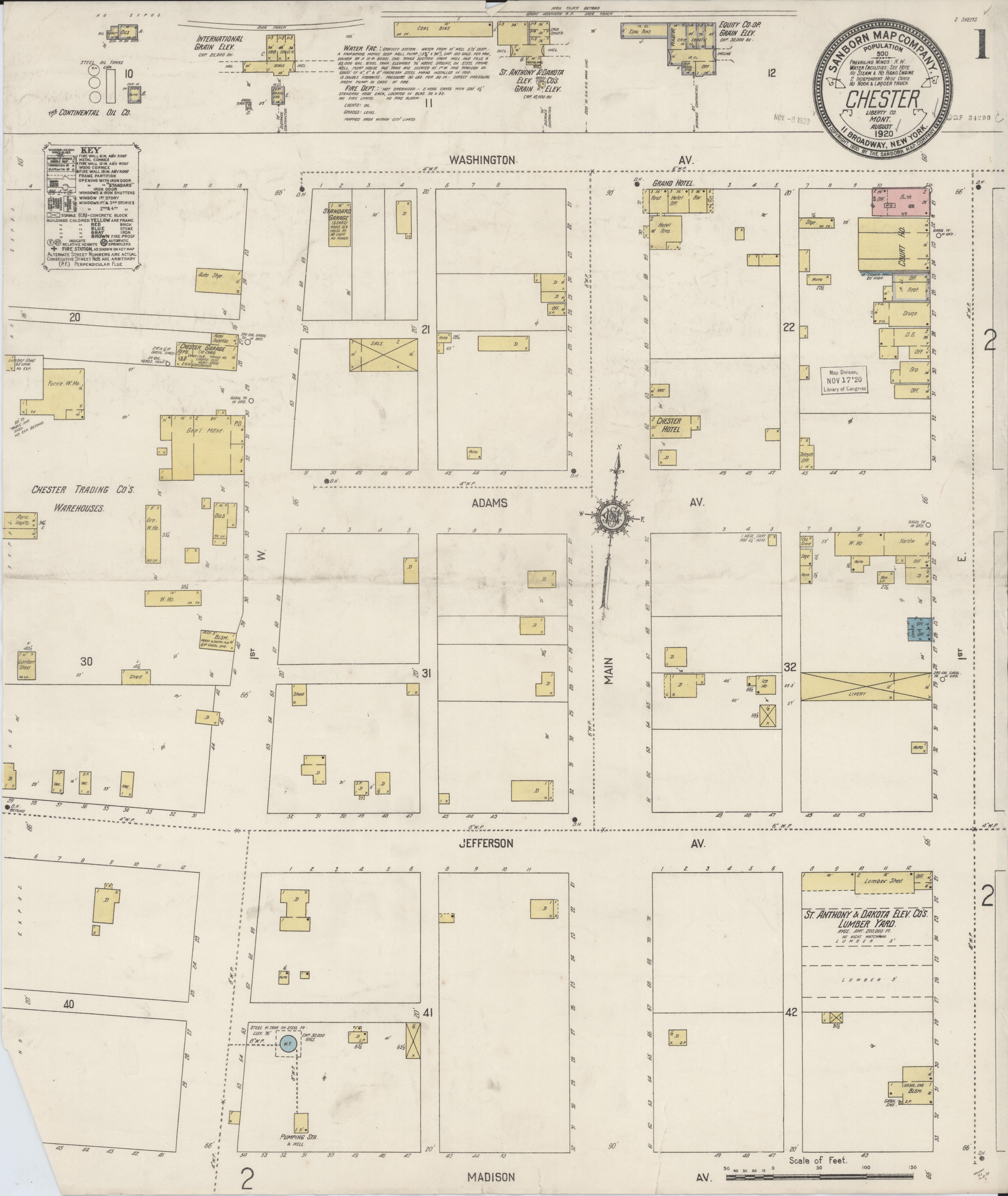
Sanborn Fire Insurance Map, 1920

According to the United States Census Bureau, the town has a total area of 0.48 square miles (1.24 km^{2}), all land. It is located close to the center of the Golden Triangle.

=== Climate ===
Chester experiences a semi-arid climate (Köppen BSk) with long, cold, dry winters and short, hot, wetter summers. This type of a semi-arid climate is a dry continental variety with similar temperatures as the more humid ones, albeit with less precipitation.

Climate data for Chester, Montana (1991–2020 normals, extremes 1900–1920, 1942–present)
Month	Jan	Feb	Mar	Apr	May	Jun	Jul	Aug	Sep	Oct	Nov	Dec	Year
Record high °F (°C)	66 (19)	74 (23)	79 (26)	88 (31)	94 (34)	101 (38)	104 (40)	105 (41)	99 (37)	90 (32)	77 (25)	71 (22)	105 (41)
Mean maximum °F (°C)	50.3 (10.2)	53.5 (11.9)	65.1 (18.4)	75.1 (23.9)	83.4 (28.6)	88.1 (31.2)	95.1 (35.1)	94.8 (34.9)	89.2 (31.8)	78.7 (25.9)	61.8 (16.6)	52.8 (11.6)	96.9 (36.1)
Mean daily maximum °F (°C)	28.7 (−1.8)	33.0 (0.6)	44.1 (6.7)	55.5 (13.1)	65.8 (18.8)	72.7 (22.6)	82.5 (28.1)	82.0 (27.8)	71.0 (21.7)	56.8 (13.8)	41.1 (5.1)	31.6 (−0.2)	55.4 (13.0)
Daily mean °F (°C)	15.7 (−9.1)	19.6 (−6.9)	30.4 (−0.9)	41.5 (5.3)	52.0 (11.1)	59.5 (15.3)	67.1 (19.5)	65.8 (18.8)	55.7 (13.2)	42.1 (5.6)	28.2 (−2.1)	18.6 (−7.4)	41.4 (5.2)
Mean daily minimum °F (°C)	2.6 (−16.3)	6.2 (−14.3)	16.6 (−8.6)	27.5 (−2.5)	38.2 (3.4)	46.2 (7.9)	51.7 (10.9)	49.7 (9.8)	40.5 (4.7)	27.3 (−2.6)	15.2 (−9.3)	5.6 (−14.7)	27.3 (−2.6)
Mean minimum °F (°C)	−26.0 (−32.2)	−17.1 (−27.3)	−5.9 (−21.1)	13.3 (−10.4)	23.9 (−4.5)	34.9 (1.6)	41.2 (5.1)	38.0 (3.3)	25.9 (−3.4)	8.5 (−13.1)	−9.4 (−23.0)	−17.2 (−27.3)	−32.9 (−36.1)
Record low °F (°C)	−57 (−49)	−44 (−42)	−38 (−39)	−19 (−28)	8 (−13)	19 (−7)	30 (−1)	28 (−2)	8 (−13)	−17 (−27)	−33 (−36)	−52 (−47)	−57 (−49)
Average precipitation inches (mm)	0.54 (14)	0.45 (11)	0.59 (15)	1.10 (28)	1.68 (43)	2.76 (70)	1.19 (30)	1.09 (28)	1.00 (25)	0.74 (19)	0.58 (15)	0.56 (14)	12.28 (312)
Average snowfall inches (cm)	8.3 (21)	5.7 (14)	5.1 (13)	3.7 (9.4)	0.4 (1.0)	0.1 (0.25)	0.0 (0.0)	0.0 (0.0)	0.6 (1.5)	0.7 (1.8)	5.6 (14)	6.3 (16)	36.5 (93)
Average precipitation days (≥ 0.01 in)	5.2	5.2	5.7	6.9	10.2	11.7	6.4	5.9	5.9	5.6	5.4	5.0	79.1
Average snowy days (≥ 0.1 in)	4.0	4.8	3.1	1.6	0.2	0.0	0.0	0.0	0.1	0.6	3.4	4.0	21.8
Source: NOAA

== Demographics ==
Historical population
Census	Pop.	Note	%±
1920	402		—
1930	387		−3.7%
1940	548		41.6%
1950	733		33.8%
1960	1,158		58.0%
1970	936		−19.2%
1980	963		2.9%
1990	942		−2.2%
2000	871		−7.5%
2010	847		−2.8%
2020	847		0.0%
U.S. Decennial Census

=== 2010 census ===
As of the census of 2010, there were 847 people, 395 households, and 223 families living in the town. The population density was 1,764.6 inhabitants per square mile (681.3/km^{2}). There were 462 housing units at an average density of 962.5 per square mile (371.6/km^{2}). The racial makeup of the town was 97.3% White, 0.2% African American, 0.2% Native American, 0.2% Asian, and 2.0% from two or more races.

There were 395 households, of which 21.3% had children under the age of 18 living with them, 48.4% were married couples living together, 7.3% had a female householder with no husband present, 0.8% had a male householder with no wife present, and 43.5% were non-families. 41.8% of all households were made up of individuals, and 21.7% had someone living alone who was 65 years of age or older. The average household size was 2.09 and the average family size was 2.86.

The median age in the town was 51 years. 21.3% of residents were under the age of 18; 4.3% were between the ages of 18 and 24; 17.2% were from 25 to 44; 29.3% were from 45 to 64; and 27.9% were 65 years of age or older. The gender makeup of the town was 45.5% male and 54.5% female.

=== 2000 census ===
As of the census of 2000, there were 871 people, 384 households, and 228 families living in the town. The population density was 1,668.2 inhabitants per square mile (644.1/km^{2}). There were 471 housing units at an average density of 1,010.2 per square mile (390.0/km^{2}). The racial makeup of the town was 98.74% White, 0.23% Native American, 0.57% Asian, and 0.46% from two or more races.

There were 384 households, out of which 24.7% had children under the age of 18 living with them, 50.5% were married couples living together, 7.6% had a female householder with no husband present, and 40.6% were non-families. 37.2% of all households were made up of individuals, and 18.8% had someone living alone who was 65 years of age or older. The average household size was 2.11 and the average family size was 2.79.

In the town, the population was spread out, with 20.7% under the age of 18, 4.4% from 18 to 24, 20.1% from 25 to 44, 27.2% from 45 to 64, and 27.7% who were 65 years of age or older. The median age was 47 years. For every 100 females there were 84.1 males. For every 100 females age 18 and over, there were 81.8 males.

The median income for a household in the town was $27,578, and the median income for a family was $42,639. Males had a median income of $26,154 versus $17,417 for females. The per capita income for the town was $16,077. About 14.6% of families and 13.5% of the population were below the poverty line, including 17.1% of those under age 18 and 13.5% of those age 65 or over.

== Arts and culture ==
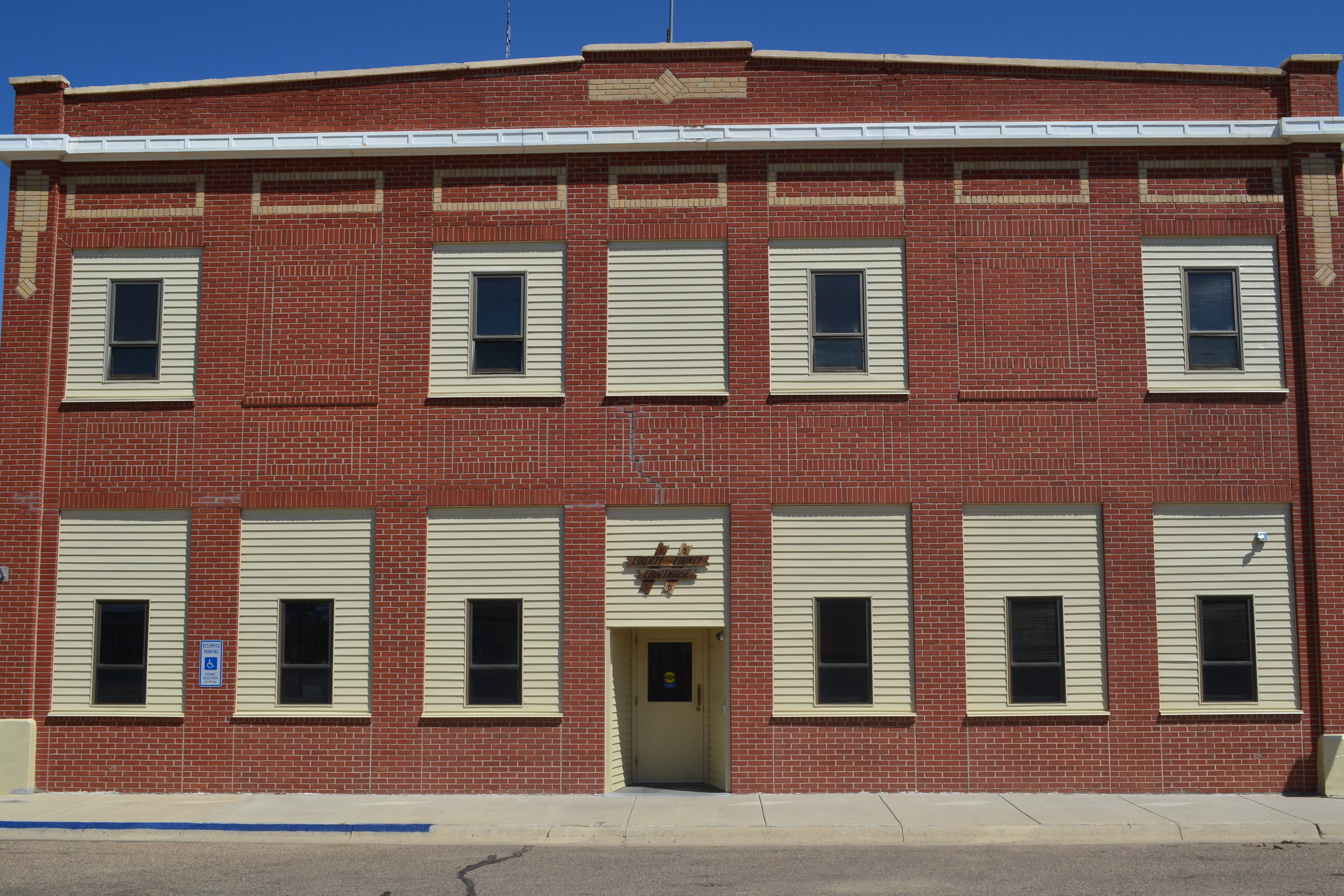
Liberty County Courthouse

During the summer, the Liberty County Museum showcases the rich history of the area and its people. The Liberty Village Arts Center displays a variety of local and regional items for show and for purchase.

At the Liberty County Library, there are print and digital media and internet connected computers.

== Parks and recreation ==
Lake Elwell, 15 miles (24 km) southwest of Chester, offer opportunities for boating, skiing, camping, picnicking, and both freshwater fishing and ice fishing. Fishing and floating are also available on the Marias River downstream from Tiber Dam. The Sweet Grass Hills to the north are the highest elevation peaks east of Glacier Park within 30 miles (48 km) of Highway 2. Hunting for deer, antelope, game birds, and elk is popular in the fall.

During the summer, the city operates the swimming pool, provides certified swim lessons, and hosts an annual swim meet drawing competitors from around the state. The city park provides a pavilion, picnic and playground area, and restrooms. In the winter, there is an ice skating rink.

== Education ==
CJI (Chester-Joplin-Inverness) School was formed in 2005 and competes in the Class C division of the Montana High School Association.

== Local media ==
=== Radio ===
- KSEN AM 1150 "Good as Gold", Shelby, MT(Oldies)
- KZIN FM 96.7 "Wide Open Country", Shelby, MT (Country music)
- KPQX FM 92.5 "Your Kind of Country", Havre, MT (Country music)
- KXEI FM 95.1 "Your Network of Praise", Havre, MT (Christian music)
- KMON AM 560 Great Falls, MT(Classic Country)

=== Television ===
Stations available from the Great Falls market:

- KRTV Ch. 3.1 (CBS), Ch 3.2 (CW), Ch 3.3 (Grit), Ch 3.4 (ION), Ch 3.5 (Laff)
- KTVH Ch. 12.1 (NBC), Ch 12.2 (CW), Ch 12.3 (Cozi TV), 12.4 (Court TV), 12.5 (Court TV Mystery)
- KUGF-TV Ch. 21.1 (PBS), Ch 21.2 (PBS Kids), Ch 21.3 (Create), Ch 21.4 (World)), Ch 21.5 (Legislature)
- KFBB Ch. 5.1 (ABC), Ch 5.2 (FOX), Ch 5.3 (SWX Right Now)

Stations available from the Lethbridge, Alberta, market:

- CISA-DT Ch. 7.1 (Global)
- CFCN-DT Ch. 13.1 (CTV)

Satellite television providers are available to the entire area. Wired internet streaming available from Triangle Telephone ITS.

=== Newspapers ===
The Liberty County Times is a weekly newspaper from Chester. The Havre Daily News is regionally available. Its circulation is 3,500 papers daily, published Monday through Friday. It has a full online edition by subscription, as well as some free content online. The larger Great Falls Tribune is also available in most areas.

== Infrastructure ==
U.S. Route 2 passes on the northern side of the town.

Liberty County Airport is a county-owned airport a mile (1.6 km) west of Chester.

Amtrak's Empire Builder, which operates between Seattle/Portland and Chicago, passes through the town on BNSF tracks but makes no stop. The nearest station is located in Shelby, 43 miles (69 km) to the west. This train has suffered multiple major accidents just outside the town on the Buelow passing siding. The first was the Great Northern Buelow wreck in March 1966 when an eastbound Empire Builder (Note: When it was still operated by Great Northern Railway) was struck head-on by a westbound Western Star killing two and injuring 77. The second was in September 2021 when a westbound Empire Builder derailed, killing three and injuring 49.

Liberty County Transit is available for all ages and provides transportation within Liberty County and to connect to Amtrak in Shelby or to the bus and planes in Great Falls. Transportation for medical appointments is also available.

Logan Health Chester is host to primary care physicians, nurses, and visiting medical specialists.

== Notable people ==
- Philip Aaberg, pianist, keyboardist, and composer was born in Chester in 1949
- Michael Claxton (born 1976), basketball player and coach
- Casey FitzSimmons, NFL tight end with Detroit Lions
- William E. Hunt, Montana Supreme Court Justice (1985–2000)
- Allen Kolstad, former Lieutenant Governor of Montana (1989–1991)
