= Liberty County, Montana =

County in Montana, United States

- County
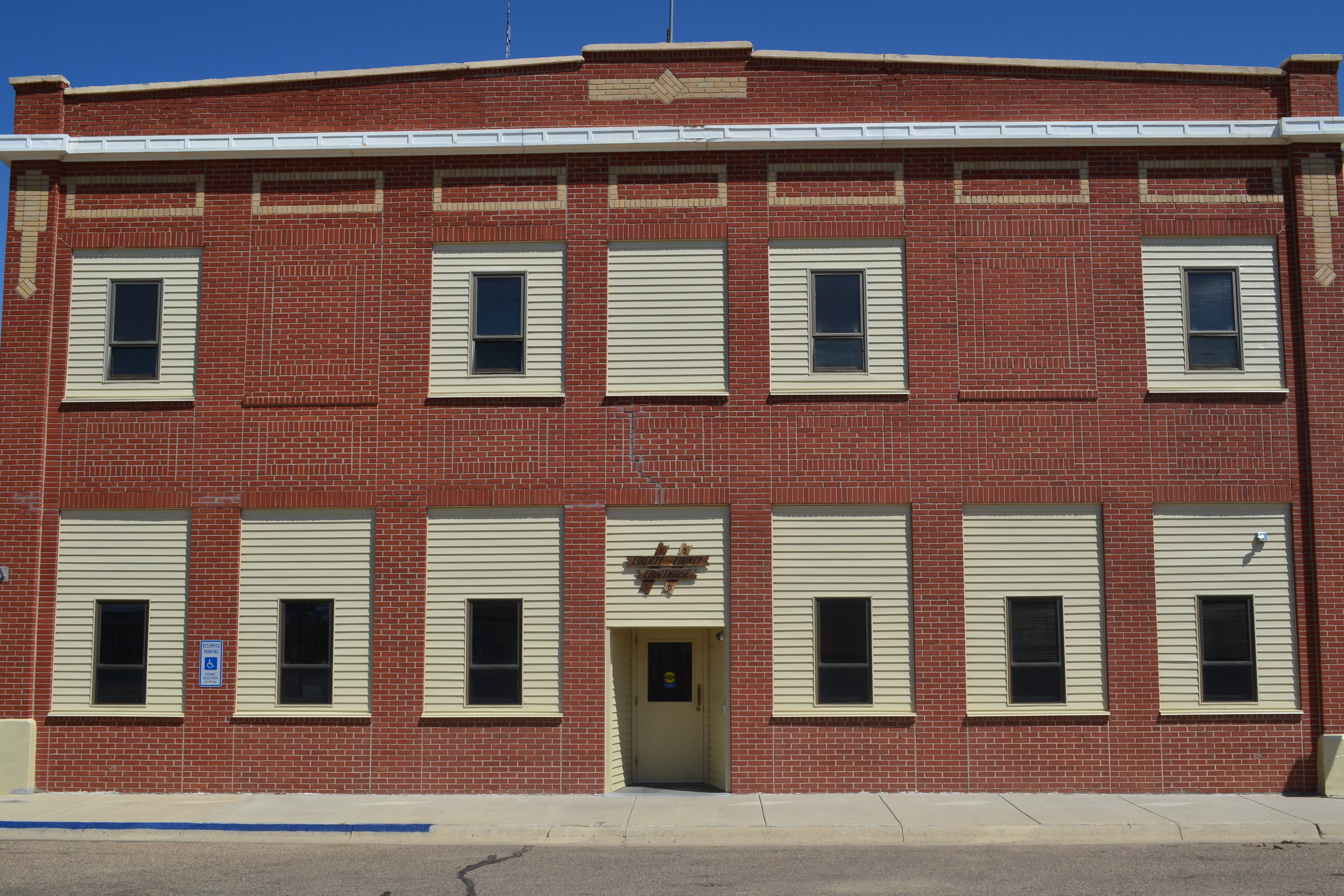
- Liberty County Courthouse in Chester

- Location within the U.S. state of Montana
- Coordinates: 48°33′N 111°02′W
- Country: United States
- State: Montana
- Founded: February 11, 1920
- Named for: Liberty
- Seat: Chester
- Largest town: Chester

Area
  - Total: 1,447 sq mi (3,750 km^{2})
  - Land: 1,430 sq mi (3,700 km^{2})
  - Water: 17 sq mi (44 km^{2}) 1.2%

Population (2020)
  - Total: 1,959
  - Estimate (2025): 1,957 ▼
  - Density: 1.4/sq mi (0.54/km^{2})
- Time zone: UTC−7 (Mountain)
  - Summer (DST): UTC−6 (MDT)
- Congressional district: 2nd
- Website: www.libertycountymt.gov
- Montana county number 48

Liberty County is a county located in the U.S. state of Montana. As of the 2020 census, the population was 1,959. Its county seat is Chester. The decision to separate the future Liberty County area from the previous Hill and Chouteau counties was carried in a 1919 vote; the organization was authorized to commence in the following February.

The southwestern corner of Liberty County holds Tiber Dam, a popular tourist and recreation area.

== Geography ==
Liberty County is on the state's north line, so that it shares the US border with Canada. It abuts the Canadian province of Alberta. According to the United States Census Bureau, the county has a total area of 1,447 square miles (3,750 km^{2}), of which 1,430 square miles (3,700 km^{2}) is land and 17 square miles (44 km^{2}) (1.2%) is water.

=== Adjacent counties ===
- Toole County – west
- Pondera County – southwest
- Chouteau County – south
- Hill County – east
- County of Forty Mile No. 8, Alberta – north

== Demographics ==
Historical population
Census	Pop.	Note	%±
1920	2,416		—
1930	2,198		−9.0%
1940	2,209		0.5%
1950	2,180		−1.3%
1960	2,624		20.4%
1970	2,359		−10.1%
1980	2,329		−1.3%
1990	2,295		−1.5%
2000	2,158		−6.0%
2010	2,339		8.4%
2020	1,959		−16.2%
2025 (est.)	1,957	▼	−0.1%
U.S. Decennial Census:

=== 2020 census ===
As of the 2020 census, the county had a population of 1,959. Of the residents, 23.8% were under the age of 18 and 23.5% were 65 years of age or older; the median age was 42.1 years. For every 100 females there were 93.8 males, and for every 100 females age 18 and over there were 92.3 males. 0.0% of residents lived in urban areas and 100.0% lived in rural areas.

The racial makeup of the county was 94.7% White, 0.1% Black or African American, 0.5% American Indian and Alaska Native, 0.3% Asian, 0.3% from some other race, and 4.0% from two or more races. Hispanic or Latino residents of any race comprised 0.7% of the population.

There were 732 households in the county, of which 26.8% had children under the age of 18 living with them and 24.9% had a female householder with no spouse or partner present. About 33.4% of all households were made up of individuals and 17.8% had someone living alone who was 65 years of age or older.

There were 933 housing units, of which 21.5% were vacant. Among occupied housing units, 71.0% were owner-occupied and 29.0% were renter-occupied. The homeowner vacancy rate was 3.7% and the rental vacancy rate was 5.8%.

=== 2010 census ===
As of the 2010 census, there were 2,339 people, 822 households, and 537 families living in the county. The population density was 1.6 inhabitants per square mile (0.62/km^{2}). There were 1,043 housing units at an average density of 0.7 units per square mile (0.27 units/km^{2}). The racial makeup of the county was 98.2% white, 0.2% American Indian, 0.1% black or African American, 0.1% Asian, 0.2% from other races, and 1.2% from two or more races. Those of Hispanic or Latino origin made up 0.3% of the population. In terms of ancestry, 55.4% were German, 24.1% were Norwegian, 14.5% were Irish, 9.9% were English, and 1.4% were American.

Of the 822 households, 23.7% had children under the age of 18 living with them, 59.5% were married couples living together, 4.7% had a female householder with no husband present, 34.7% were non-families, and 32.2% of all households were made up of individuals. The average household size was 2.36 and the average family size was 3.00. The median age was 44.6 years.

The median income for a household in the county was $40,212 and the median income for a family was $44,957. Males had a median income of $35,788 versus $30,714 for females. The per capita income for the county was $19,097. About 12.4% of families and 19.5% of the population were below the poverty line, including 31.6% of those under age 18 and 15.6% of those age 65 or over.

=== 2000 census record ===
Researchers William P. O'Hare and Kenneth M. Johnson described the county as typical of the northern Great Plains in being very thinly settled, almost fully dependent on agriculture, and lacking in urban areas. They noted that income can fluctuate substantially from year to year, depending on rainfall (which affects harvest yields) as well as grain and cattle prices, and that the 2000 Census recorded low incomes in 1999 after several years of drought. Also, the presence of Hutterite colonies in the county depresses per capita incomes because Hutterite families have significantly more children than the general population.

== Politics ==
As of 2024 Liberty County is a solid Republican county.

United States presidential election results for Liberty County, Montana
Year	Republican		Democratic		Third party(ies)	
Year	No.	%	No.	%	No.	%
1920	757	63.61%	331	27.82%	102	8.57%
1924	239	33.71%	141	19.89%	329	46.40%
1928	446	56.74%	332	42.24%	8	1.02%
1932	252	24.95%	731	72.38%	27	2.67%
1936	276	25.92%	758	71.17%	31	2.91%
1940	434	43.66%	550	55.33%	10	1.01%
1944	393	46.67%	440	52.26%	9	1.07%
1948	354	38.23%	542	58.53%	30	3.24%
1952	671	61.67%	411	37.78%	6	0.55%
1956	601	55.19%	488	44.81%	0	0.00%
1960	597	54.27%	501	45.55%	2	0.18%
1964	533	46.15%	619	53.59%	3	0.26%
1968	670	58.57%	390	34.09%	84	7.34%
1972	808	65.43%	365	29.55%	62	5.02%
1976	638	54.86%	506	43.51%	19	1.63%
1980	872	69.43%	283	22.53%	101	8.04%
1984	895	72.82%	323	26.28%	11	0.90%
1988	771	63.82%	418	34.60%	19	1.57%
1992	512	42.28%	321	26.51%	378	31.21%
1996	634	54.56%	379	32.62%	149	12.82%
2000	752	72.03%	243	23.28%	49	4.69%
2004	734	71.06%	281	27.20%	18	1.74%
2008	594	59.34%	367	36.66%	40	4.00%
2012	702	70.34%	257	25.75%	39	3.91%
2016	698	72.63%	206	21.44%	57	5.93%
2020	821	75.81%	249	22.99%	13	1.20%
2024	752	76.11%	214	21.66%	22	2.23%

== Communities ==
=== Town ===
- Chester (county seat)

=== Census-designated places ===
- Eagle Creek Colony
- Joplin
- Riverview Colony
- Sage Creek Colony
- Whitlash

=== Other unincorporated communities ===
- Hill
- Lothair
- Tiber

== See also ==
- List of lakes in Liberty County, Montana
- List of mountains in Liberty County, Montana
- National Register of Historic Places listings in Liberty County MT
