= Remote Video Inspection System =

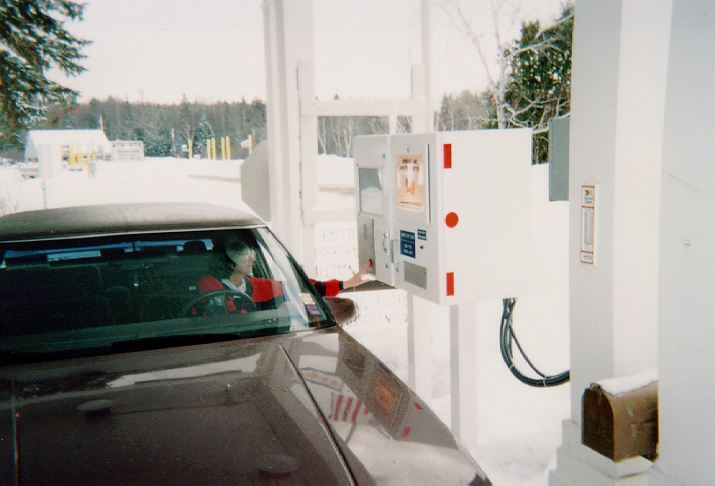
RVIS in use at the Orient, Maine, port of entry in January 1997

The Remote Video Inspection System (RVIS) was deployed by United States in the late 1990s at select low-traffic border entry points from Canada. The system allowed passport and customs inspections to be conducted remotely, so that low-risk travelers could enter the country during hours that the border station did not have on-site staff. The system was successfully deployed at a number of entry points, in six different states. RVIS was discontinued following the September 11 attacks.

== Conception ==
In the early 1990s, the Immigration and Naturalization Service (INS) was interested in finding ways to enable low-risk travelers to enter the United States from Canada at small ports of entry after inspection services had ended for the day. INS commissioned its contractor EDS, as well as the U.S. Department of Transportation John A. Volpe National Transportation Systems Center and its contractors Labblee Inc. and Bishop Systems to develop and deploy a system that transmitted audio, video and data to an inspector at a nearby 24-hour port of entry. The system was originally named "Remote Inspection Communicator And Remote Document Observer" (RICARDO), but the name was changed to Remote Video Inspection System (RVIS) prior to its first deployment.

== Deployment ==
RVIS consisted of a series of pan–tilt–zoom cameras (PTZ), an amplified speakerphone, a card reader and a telecommunications device for the deaf (TDD). There were vehicle sensors at the Canada–United States border that initiated the system, and exit sensors that alerted operators that a drive-by had occurred. There were also area lights, a text display and a traffic signal. Some ports of entry had electronic gates for traffic management. Inspectors at the remote location could control the PTZ cameras, and conduct a verbal interview with the driver and passengers.

The first two RVIS sites were at the border crossings of Forest City and Orient in Maine in 1996. By 2000, RVIS systems had been deployed at 18 of 22 planned locations:

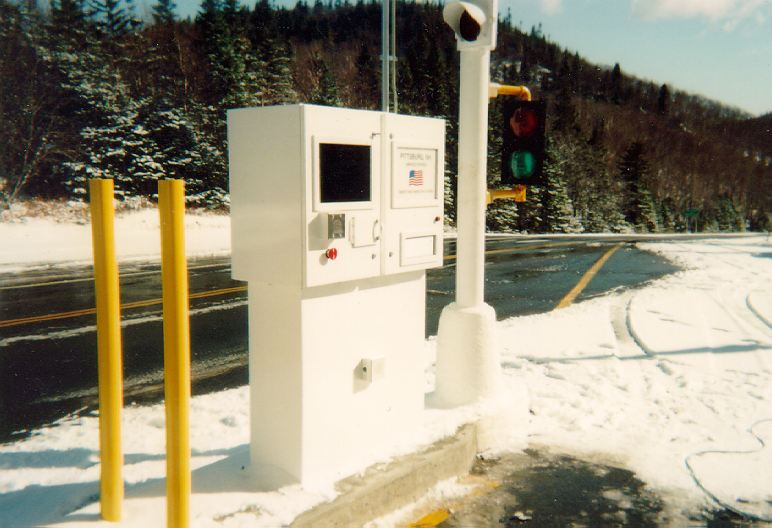
RVIS at the Pittsburg–Chartierville Border Crossing

U.S. state	U.S. location	Border crossing
Maine	Easton	Easton–River de Chute Border Crossing
Maine	Forest City	Forest City Border Crossing
Maine	Monticello	Monticello–Bloomfield Border Crossing
Maine	Orient	Orient–Fosterville Border Crossing
Minnesota	Noyes	Noyes–Emerson East Border Crossing†
Minnesota	Pinecreek	Pinecreek–Piney Border Crossing
Montana	Scobey	Scobey–Coronach Border Crossing
Montana	Whitetail	Whitetail–Big Beaver Border Crossing‡
Montana	Whitlash	Whitlash–Aden Border Crossing
New Hampshire	Pittsburg	Pittsburg–Chartierville Border Crossing
North Dakota	Ambrose	Ambrose–Torquay Border Crossing
North Dakota	Carbury	Carbury–Goodlands Border Crossing
North Dakota	Hannah	Hannah–Snowflake Border Crossing
North Dakota	Hansboro	Hansboro–Cartwright Border Crossing
North Dakota	Maida	Maida–Windygates Border Crossing
North Dakota	Northgate	Northgate Border Crossing
Washington	Ferry	Ferry–Midway Border Crossing
Washington	Nighthawk	Nighthawk–Chopaka Border Crossing

† Closed since 2006
‡ Closed since 2013

RVIS was planned for the Morses Line Border Crossing in Vermont, but local residents opposed its installation. However, in 2016, the Canadian side implemented a similar system.

== Decommission ==
The RVIS system never achieved its full potential because its deployment pre-dated the rollout of high speed data networking at all ports of entry, which caused the video transmission to be slow and cumbersome. Its usage was suspended following the September 11 attacks, and the RVIS system was officially decommissioned on November 1, 2002.

== See also ==
- PORTPASS
- U.S. Customs and Border Protection
