= Mount Brown (Liberty County, Montana) =

Mountain in Liberty County, Montana, United States

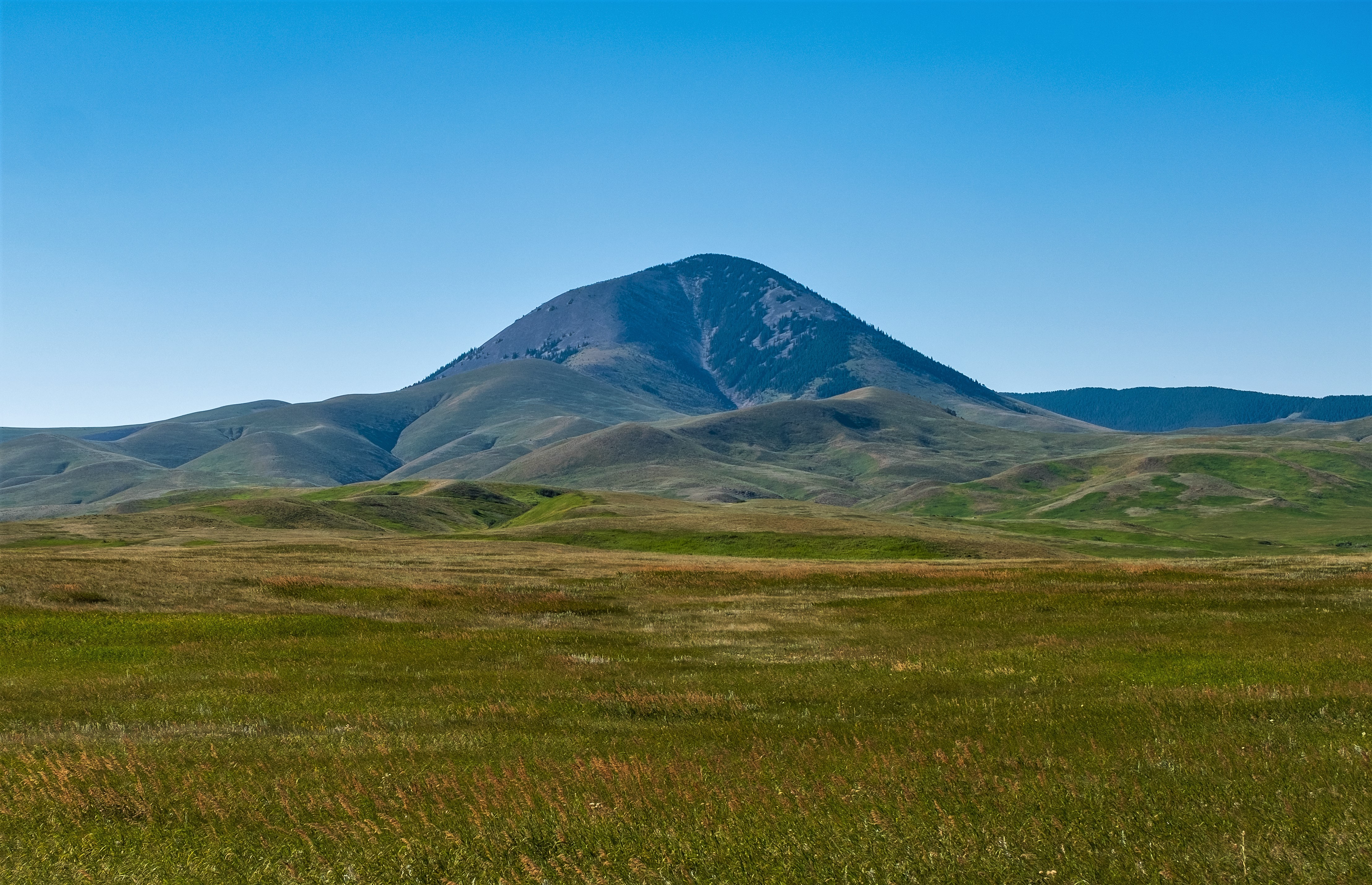
- North aspect

Highest point
- Elevation: 6,958 ft (2,121 m)
- Prominence: 3,203 ft (976 m)
- Parent peak: West Butte (6,983 ft)
- Isolation: 18.29 mi (29.43 km)
- Coordinates: 48°52′27″N 111°08′22″W

Geography
- Location within Montana Location within the United States
- Country: United States
- State: Montana
- County: Liberty
- Parent range: Sweet Grass Hills
- Topo map: USGS Haystack Butte

Geology
- Rock age: Eocene
- Mountain type: Laccolith
- Rock type: Igneous rock

Climbing
- Easiest route: class 2

Mount Brown is a 6,958-foot-elevation (2,121-meter) mountain summit located in Liberty County, Montana, United States.

== Description ==
Mount Brown is the highest point in the county, highest point of the East Butte complex, and second-highest peak in the Sweet Grass Hills. It is situated 26 miles (42 km) north of Chester, Montana, and eight miles (13 km) south of the Canada–United States border. Precipitation runoff from the mountain drains north to the Milk River. Topographic relief is significant as the summit rises 3,000 feet (910 meters) above the surrounding plains in four miles (6.4 km) which makes it a prominent landmark visible for many miles. The slopes provide habitat for elk, mule deer, and white-tailed deer.

== Geology ==
Mount Brown is an exposed laccolith composed of syenitic and monzonitic trachytes created by an igneous intrusion through older Jurassic and Cretaceous sedimentary rocks during the Eocene, about 50 million years ago. These sedimentary rocks are primarily shale and siltstone. Over time, erosion of the sedimentary rock has exposed the solidified laccolith which is more resistant to weathering.

== History ==
The Sweet Grass Hills, which are centered in buffalo hunting territory, are sacred to the Blackfoot and other tribes. The Blackfoot called East Butte "pinapitsékatúyis" which means "east side sweet pine." In 1806, Meriwether Lewis sighted the mountains from the Missouri River, which is 100 miles (160 km) distant, and George Mercer Dawson reported seeing them from 140 miles (230 km) away at Blackfoot Crossing in Alberta. The landform's toponym has been officially adopted by the United States Board on Geographic Names.

== Climate ==
Based on the Köppen climate classification, Mount Brown is located in a semi-arid climate zone with long, cold, dry winters and hot summers with cool nights. Winter temperatures can drop below −10 °F with wind chill factors below −30 °F. The wettest period of the year is generally May through August, with up to 20 inches of precipitation falling annually on the peak.

== See also ==
- Gold Butte (Middle Butte)
- Mount Lebanon (East Butte)

== Gallery ==
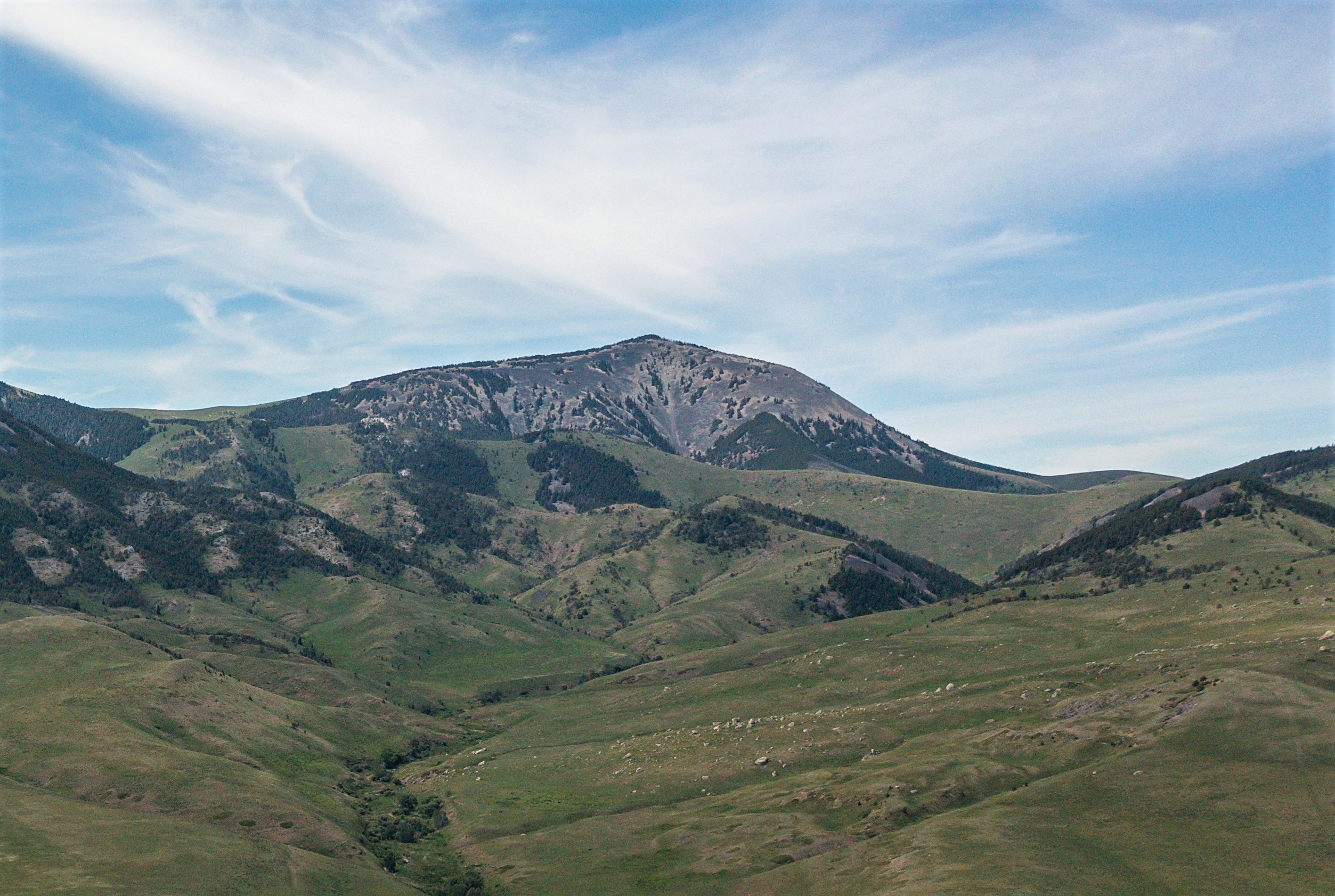
Southeast aspect.

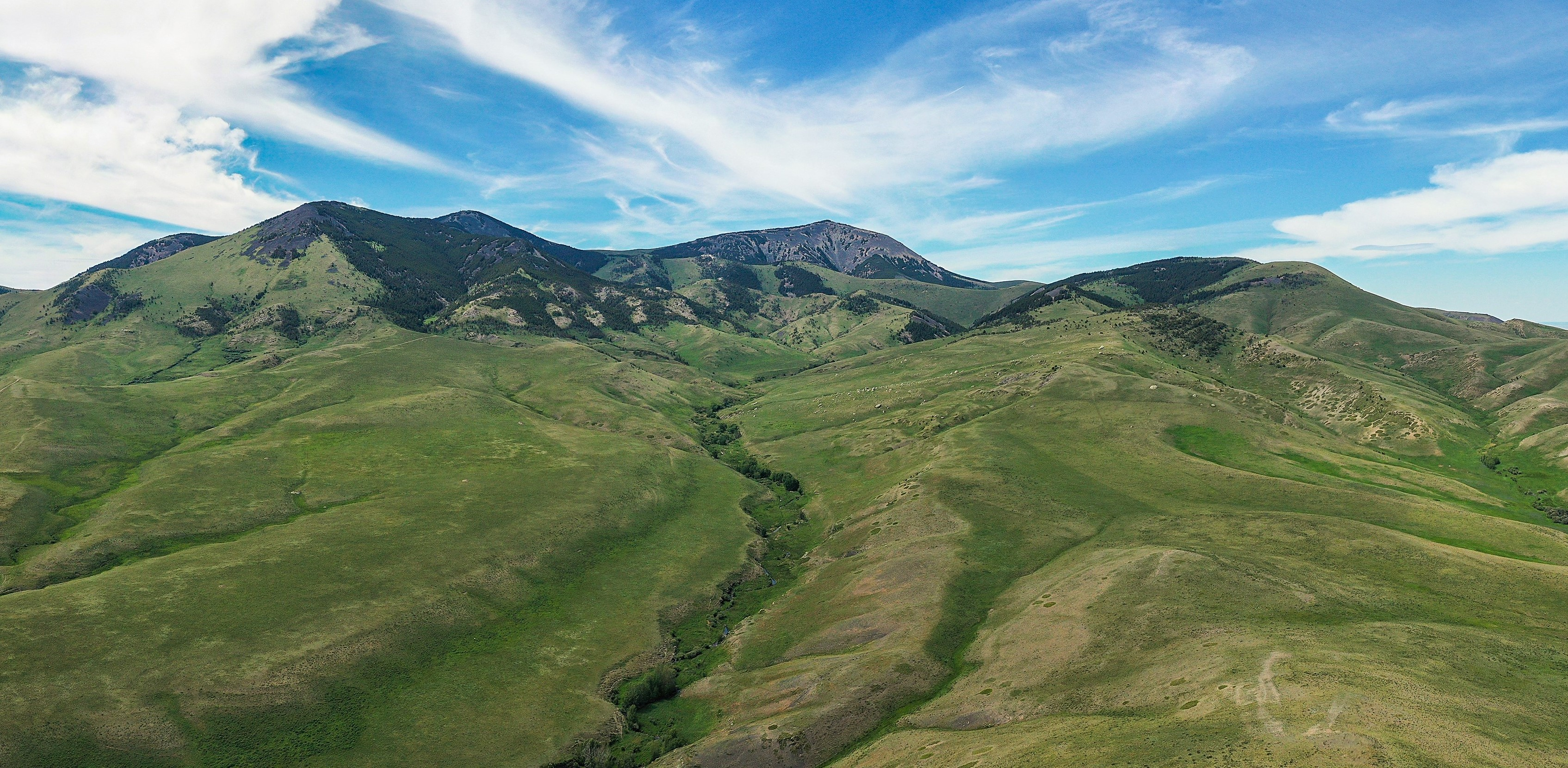
East Butte complex with Mount Brown centered at top, in back.

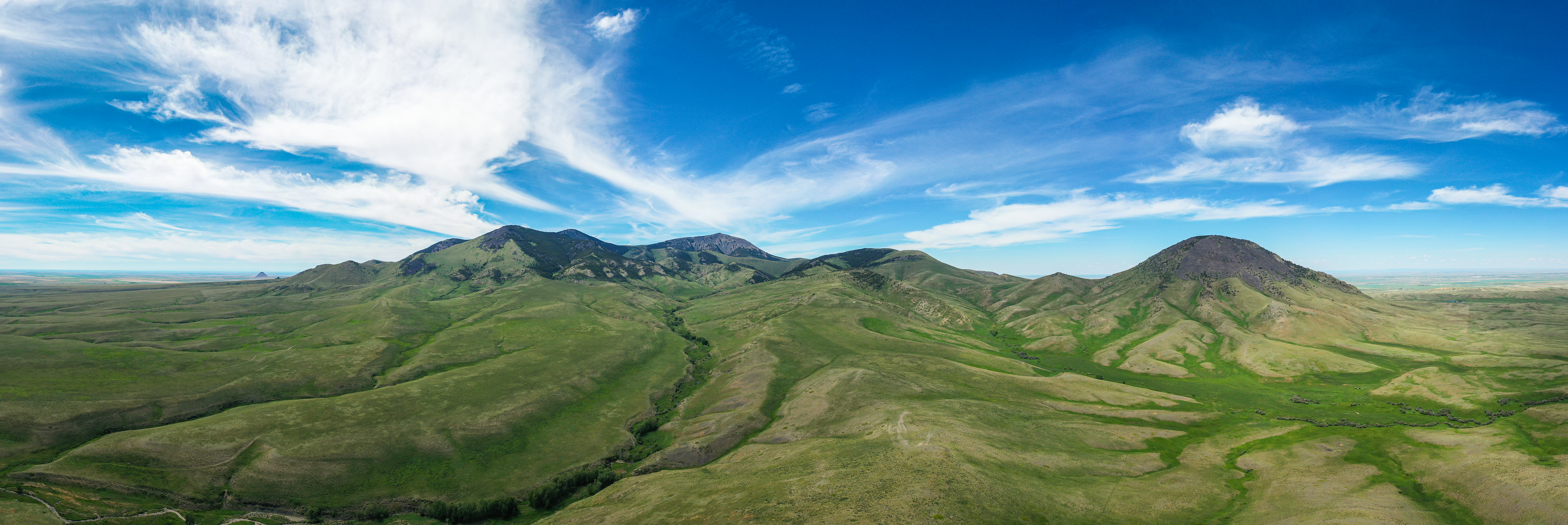
East Butte complex from southeast. Mount Brown centered on skyline, with Mount Lebanon to the right.
