= Sweet Grass Hills =

Topographic feature in Montana

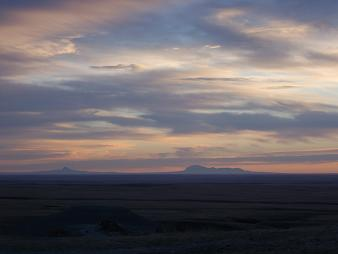
- Sweet Grass Hills in Montana from Red Rock Coulee, Alberta

Highest point
- Peak: West Butte
- Elevation: 6,983 ft (2,128 m)
- Coordinates: 48°52′N 111°22′W

Geography
- Location within Montana
- Country: United States
- State: Montana

The Sweet Grass Hills (Blackfoot: kátoyissiksi, Cheyenne: vé'ho'ôhtsévóse, Kalispel-Pend d'Oreille: ččaɫalqn, "three peaks") are a small group of low mountains rising more than 3,000 feet (910 m) above the surrounding plains southwest of Whitlash, Montana, in Liberty and Toole County, Montana.

The tallest point in the hills is West Butte at 6,983 feet (2,128 m). Quite prominent in the local area, they are clearly visible from US Highway 2 to the south, I-15, and can sometimes be seen as far North as the Crowsnest Highway (Highway 3) near Medicine Hat in Alberta as well as from the West, near Glacier National Park and Browning, Montana. Visibility may vary depending on local air temperatures or heat domes that may increase or decrease the apparent height of the features. Other named peaks in the small group are Gold Butte (6,512 ft [1,985 m]), East Butte (with two peaks, the taller of which is Mount Brown at 6,958 ft [2,121 m]), and Mount Lebanon (5,807 ft [1,770 m]).

The Sweet Grass Hills are an example of the island ranges that dot the central third portion of the state of Montana. These island ranges, completely surrounded by the 'sea' of plains and not geographically (or often geologically) part of the Rocky Mountains to the west, are "biological hotspots", containing more species than the prairie below.

== Formation and natural features ==
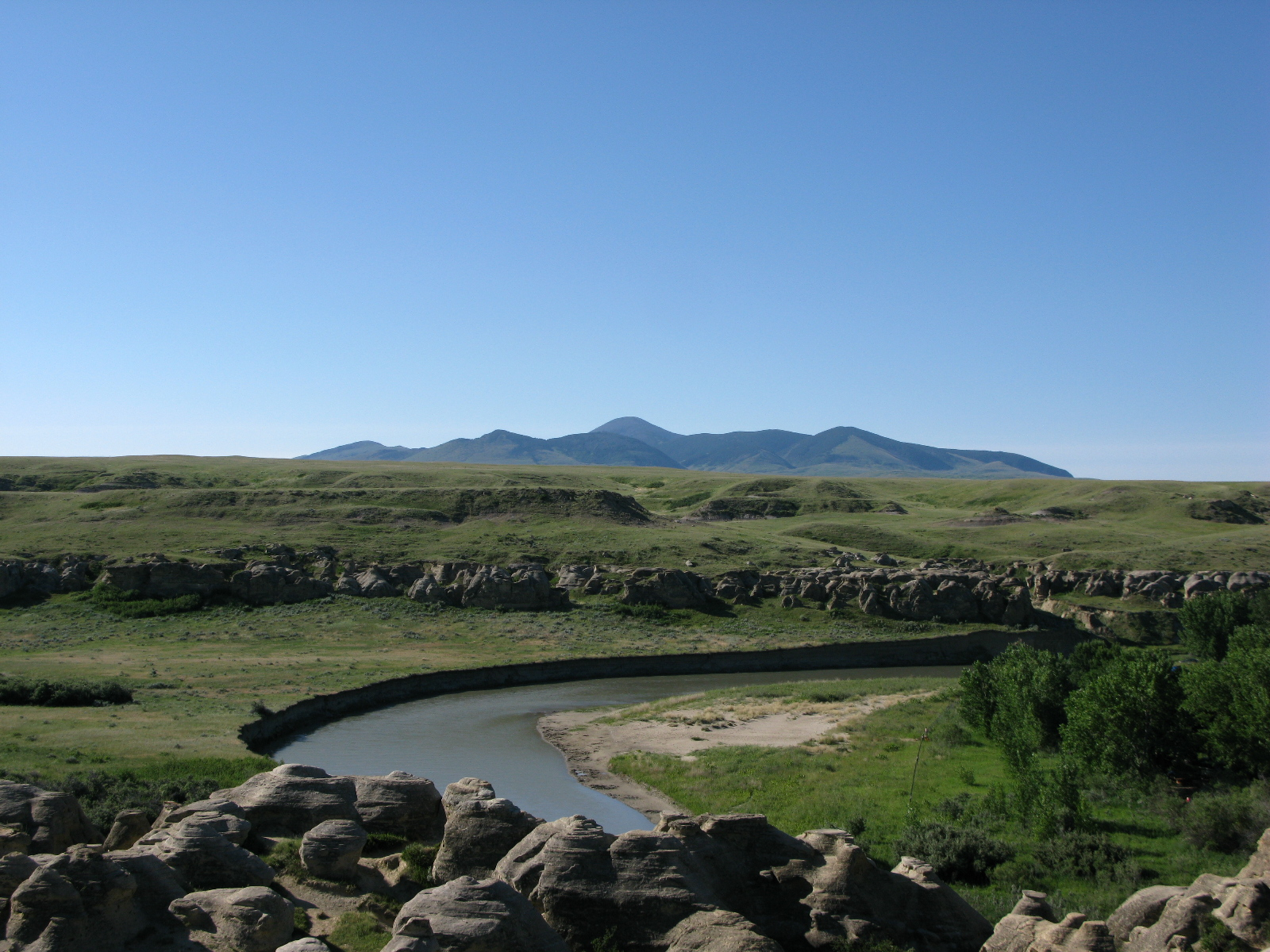
The Sweet Grass Hills as seen from Writing-on-Stone Provincial Park in Canada.

The hills were formed in the early Paleogene period, and geologically are known as stocks - intrusive igneous rock forced up from below and solidified. Because of uplift and erosion, the overlying rock formations have disappeared. The upper slopes of the hills have not been glaciated and would have stood above the ice sheet that covered the area during the last ice age. Since the Sweet Grass Hills are at a higher elevation than the surrounding prairie, temperatures are cooler and precipitation is higher. Forested areas, consisting mainly of Douglas fir, are therefore able to grow on the hills' slopes.

== Climate ==
Goldbutte 7 N is a weather station 5.5 miles (8.9km) northeast of West Butte (Montana).

Climate data for Goldbutte, Montana, 1991–2020 normals, extremes 1907–present
Month	Jan	Feb	Mar	Apr	May	Jun	Jul	Aug	Sep	Oct	Nov	Dec	Year
Record high °F (°C)	66 (19)	73 (23)	78 (26)	90 (32)	93 (34)	104 (40)	105 (41)	105 (41)	97 (36)	88 (31)	74 (23)	67 (19)	105 (41)
Mean maximum °F (°C)	55.0 (12.8)	55.6 (13.1)	64.1 (17.8)	75.3 (24.1)	82.3 (27.9)	85.7 (29.8)	93.6 (34.2)	93.6 (34.2)	87.8 (31.0)	76.8 (24.9)	62.5 (16.9)	54.7 (12.6)	95.8 (35.4)
Mean daily maximum °F (°C)	33.2 (0.7)	34.9 (1.6)	43.9 (6.6)	55.2 (12.9)	64.3 (17.9)	70.8 (21.6)	80.4 (26.9)	80.1 (26.7)	69.9 (21.1)	55.2 (12.9)	42.1 (5.6)	33.7 (0.9)	55.3 (13.0)
Daily mean °F (°C)	21.4 (−5.9)	23.1 (−4.9)	31.2 (−0.4)	41.1 (5.1)	50.1 (10.1)	56.9 (13.8)	63.9 (17.7)	63.0 (17.2)	54.4 (12.4)	42.1 (5.6)	30.4 (−0.9)	22.4 (−5.3)	41.7 (5.4)
Mean daily minimum °F (°C)	9.5 (−12.5)	11.2 (−11.6)	18.5 (−7.5)	27.0 (−2.8)	35.8 (2.1)	43.1 (6.2)	47.4 (8.6)	45.8 (7.7)	38.9 (3.8)	29.1 (−1.6)	18.7 (−7.4)	11.0 (−11.7)	28.0 (−2.2)
Mean minimum °F (°C)	−23.2 (−30.7)	−14.3 (−25.7)	−7.6 (−22.0)	9.5 (−12.5)	19.9 (−6.7)	31.7 (−0.2)	35.4 (1.9)	33.5 (0.8)	23.6 (−4.7)	7.6 (−13.6)	−8.0 (−22.2)	−19.1 (−28.4)	−30.5 (−34.7)
Record low °F (°C)	−42 (−41)	−41 (−41)	−37 (−38)	−15 (−26)	8 (−13)	22 (−6)	24 (−4)	25 (−4)	9 (−13)	−19 (−28)	−32 (−36)	−46 (−43)	−46 (−43)
Average precipitation inches (mm)	0.45 (11)	0.47 (12)	0.63 (16)	1.31 (33)	1.89 (48)	3.53 (90)	1.25 (32)	1.54 (39)	1.41 (36)	1.19 (30)	0.64 (16)	0.50 (13)	14.81 (376)
Average snowfall inches (cm)	12.4 (31)	12.9 (33)	15.1 (38)	10.8 (27)	3.7 (9.4)	0.3 (0.76)	0.0 (0.0)	0.4 (1.0)	1.4 (3.6)	5.2 (13)	10.6 (27)	13.1 (33)	85.9 (216.76)
Average precipitation days (≥ 0.01 in)	6.7	6.0	6.8	8.2	9.4	11.9	6.8	6.7	6.7	6.9	6.7	6.2	89.0
Average snowy days (≥ 0.1 in)	5.7	5.3	5.6	3.2	0.8	0.1	0.0	0.1	0.4	2.2	4.4	5.5	33.3
Source 1: NOAA
Source 2: XMACIS2

== History and cultural significance ==
The Sweet Grass Hills are a sacred site of the Blackfoot aboriginal people who live on both sides of the 49th parallel north which forms the Canada–United States border. The Sweetgrass Hills Massacre occurred in 1872 when wolfers killed four Assiniboine people in what historian Hugh Dempsey described as being "in many ways a prelude" to the Cypress Hills Massacre of 1873. The Sweet Grass Hills Treaty of 1887 was signed between the Blackfeet and the United States, ceding 17,500,000 acres (71,000 km^{2}) of land to the US Government, and dividing the remaining 6,000,000 acres (24,000 km^{2}) into three separate reservations – The Blackfeet, Fort Belknap and Fort Peck. This is often referred to as the Sweet Grass Hills Treaty/Agreement and was ratified by congress in 1888. In 1993, the Hills were listed as one of America's Most Endangered Places. Mineral claims were staked here by Manhattan Minerals in 1995.

Several TV transmitting towers were erected on Mount Royal in the late 20th Century to relay broadcasts from Lethbridge and Great Falls. Despite the low power of these rebroadcasting transmitters, their high elevations relative to the surrounding terrain allow even the UHF signals to be received as far north as the southern outskirts of Lethbridge. The transmitters remain in place today, although storm damage may keep some of them off the air for months at a time.

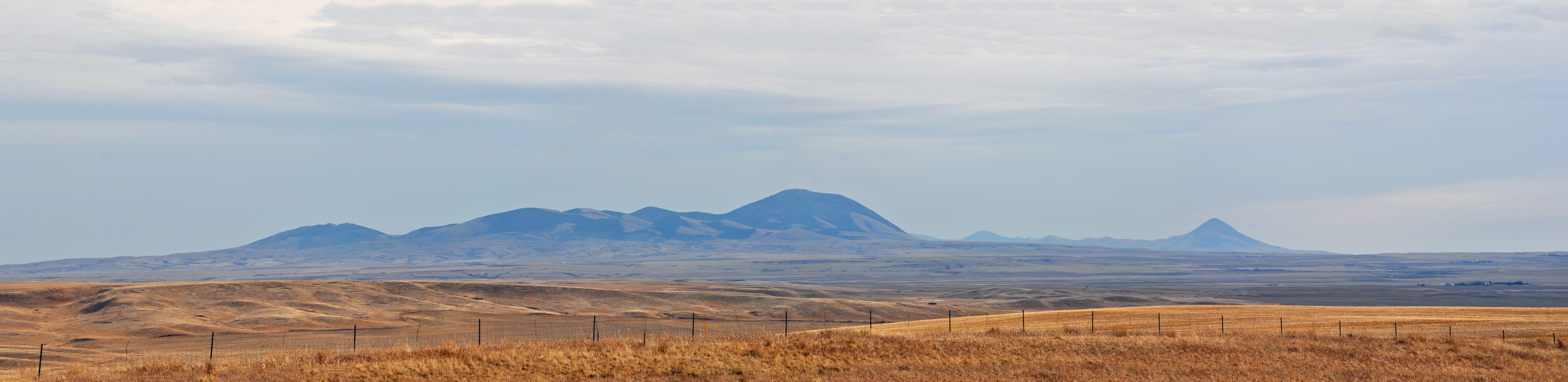
West face Sweet Grass Hills from Sunburst, Montana on October 27, 2016

== See also ==
- Sweet Grass, Montana
- Milk River (Alberta–Montana)
- Milk River Ridge
- List of mountain ranges in Montana
- Island Range
- Sky Island
