= Castle Mountains (Montana) =

Mountain range in Meagher County, Montana, United States

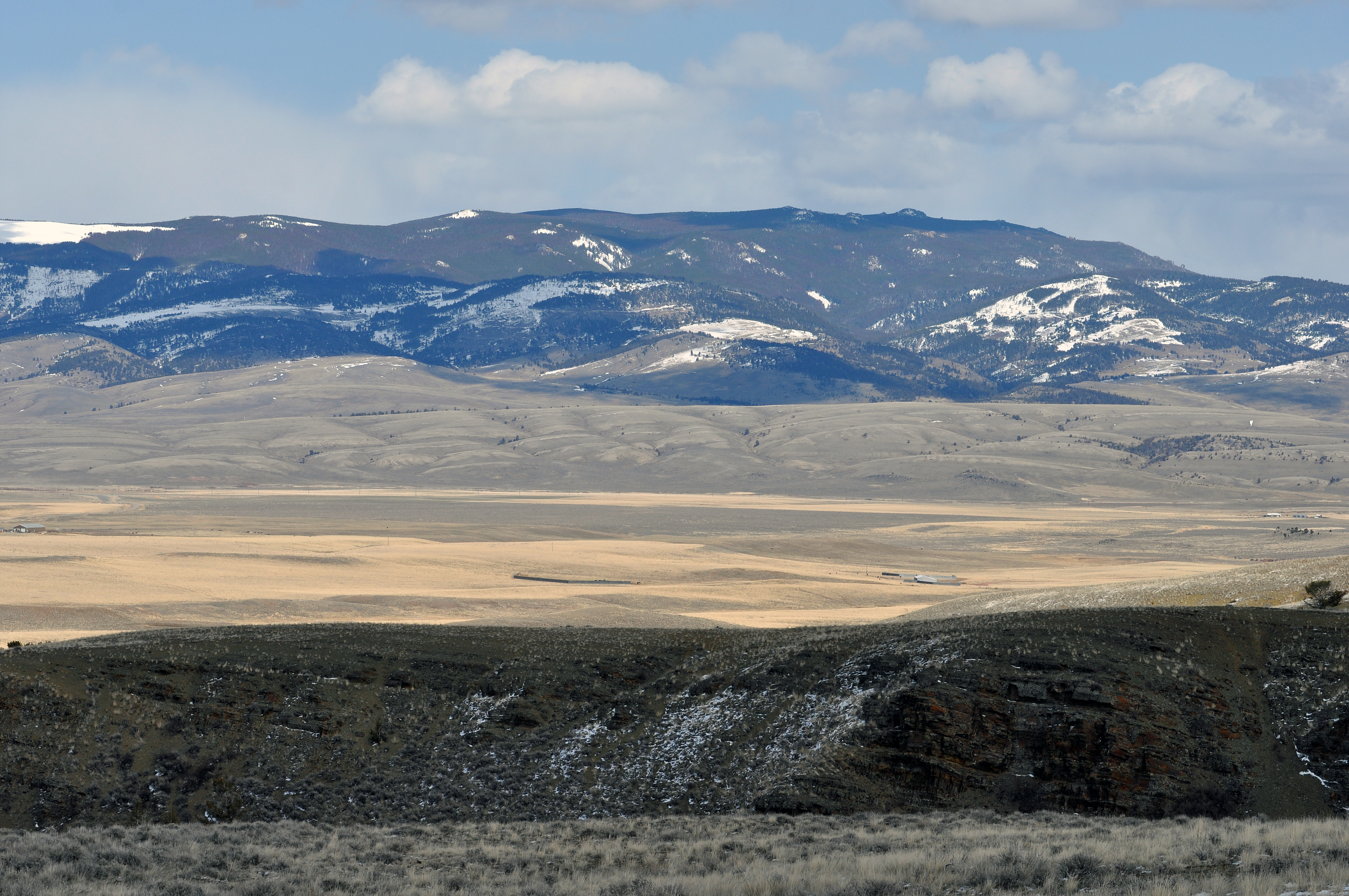
- Western face of Castle Mountains near Ringling, Montana

Highest point
- Peak: Elk Peak (Meagher County, Montana)
- Elevation: 8,589 ft (2,618 m)
- Coordinates: 46°28′11″N 110°45′54″W

Geography
- Country: United States
- State: Montana

The Castle Mountains, highest point Elk Peak, el. 8,589 feet (2,618 m), are an island range east of White Sulphur Springs in Meagher County, Montana, United States. About 30,000 acres of the Castles were roadless as of 1995. The western portion of the Castles are moist, while the eastside is dry, porous limestone hills. The range gets its name from "castle turrets", 50-foot high igneous rock spires on the western slopes. The range was the focus of mining activity in the previous century; crumbling remains of old miners' cabins and diggings are present throughout the area. The landscape is characterized by a central cluster of peaks over 8,000 feet and extensive grassy parks surrounded by lodgepole pine and limber pine. The Castles are lightly used by recreationists except for hunters in the fall. On the peak of Castle Mountain itself is a logbook for the few who reach the top. There is no trail that leads to the peak.

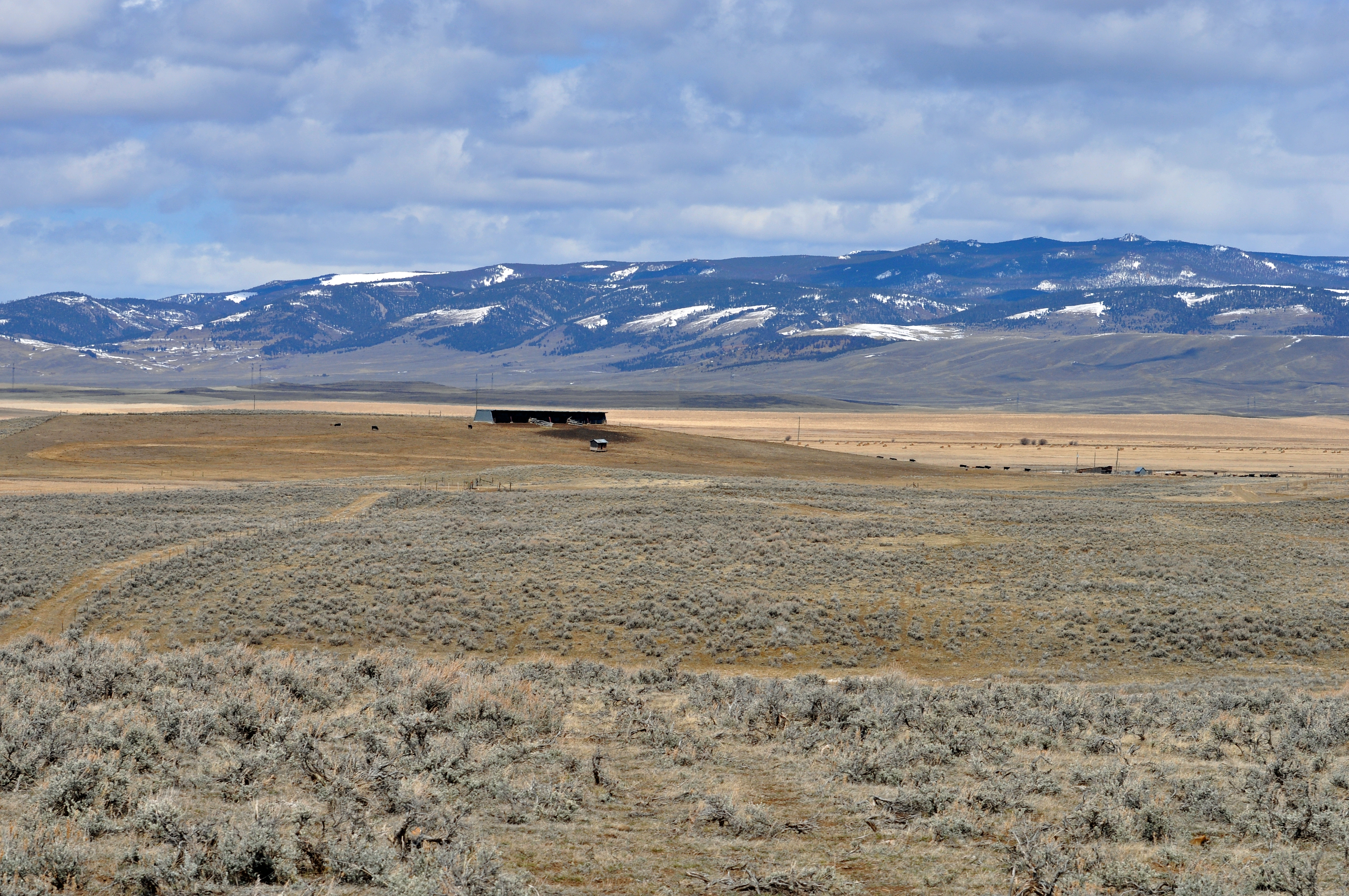
Southern face of Castle Mountains from Ringling, Montana

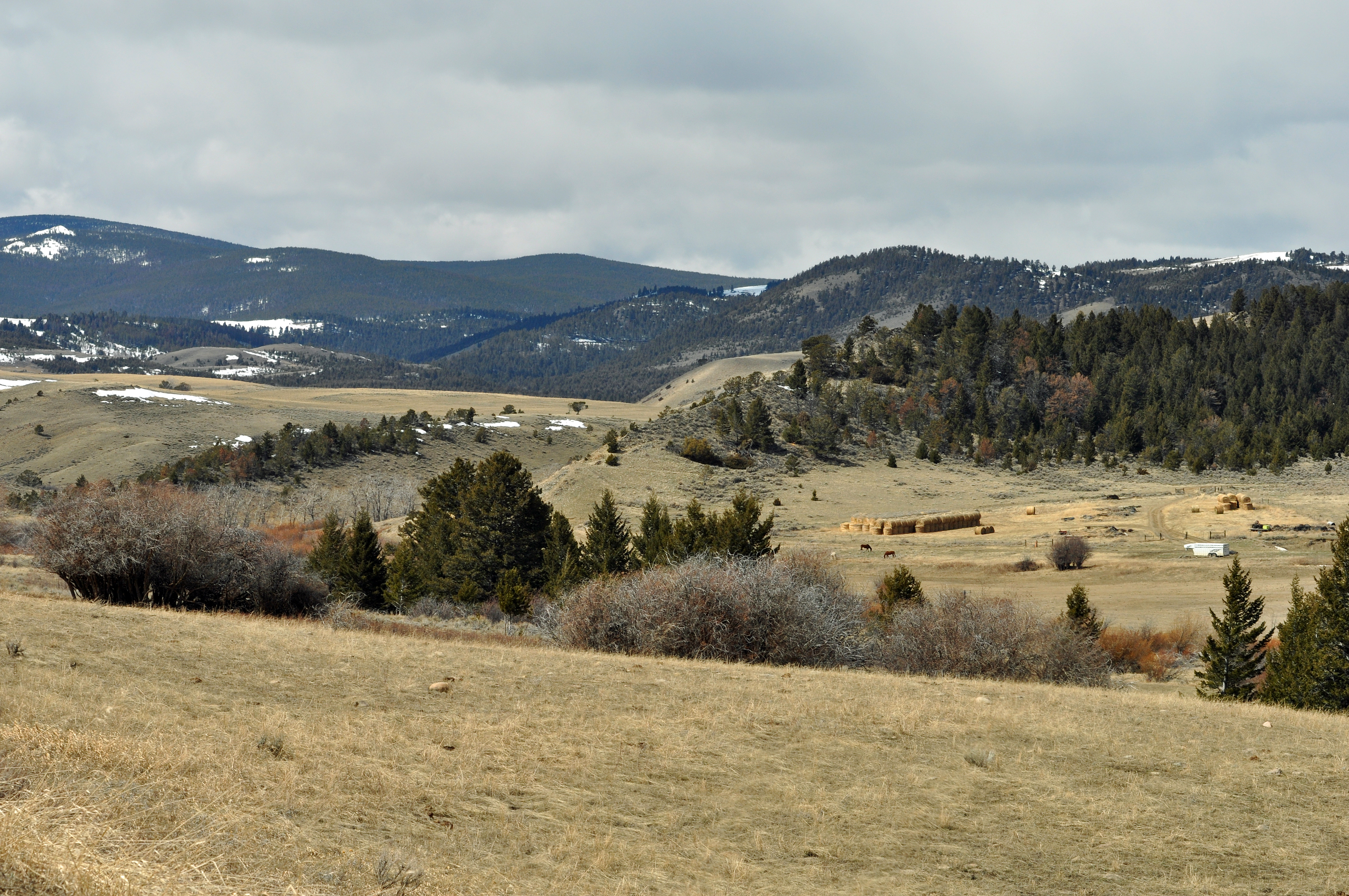
Southeastern corner of Castle Mountain on Castle Town road

== See also ==
- List of mountain ranges in Montana
- Island Range
- Sky Island
