= List of mountains in Liberty County, Montana =

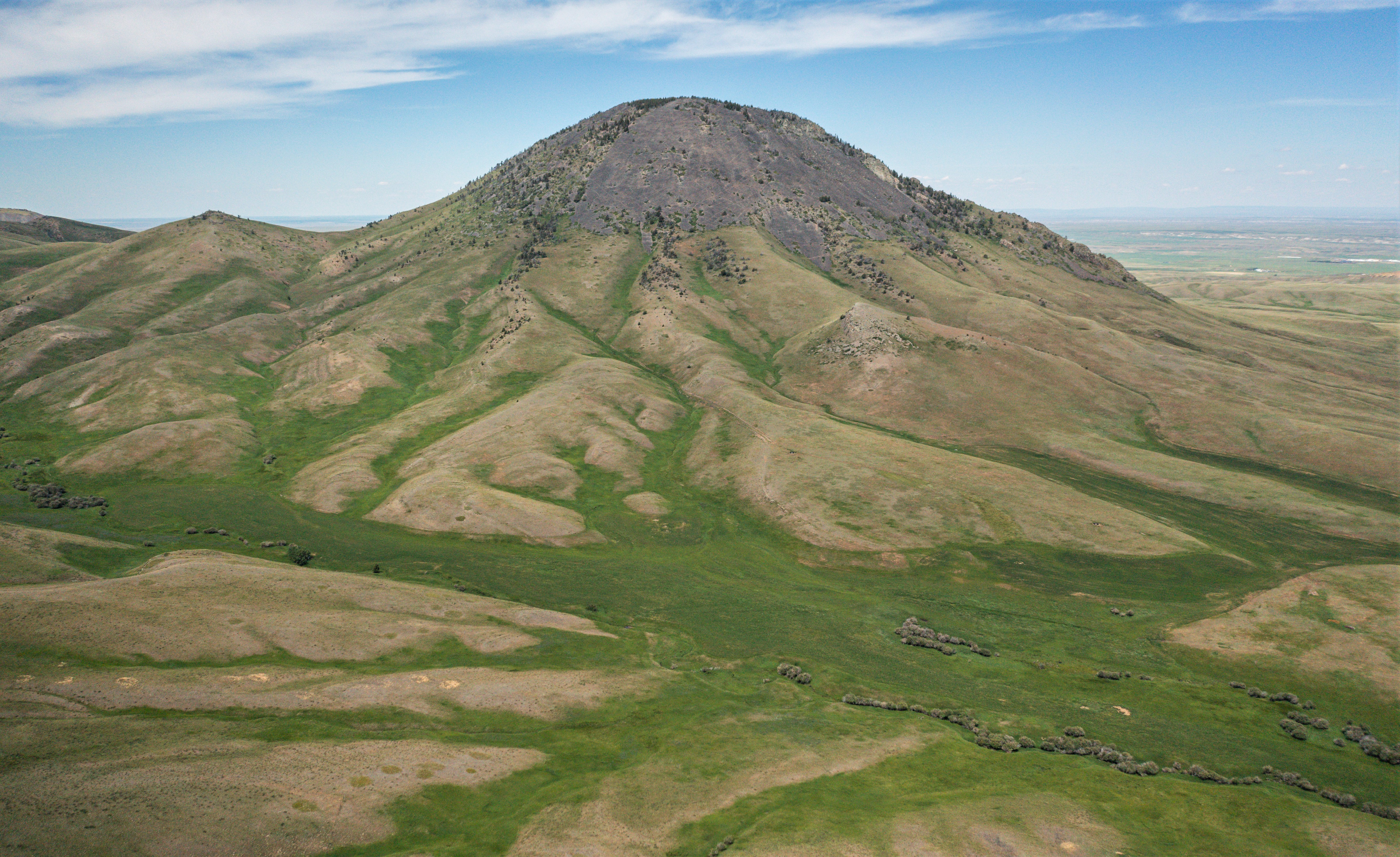
SE aspect of Mount Lebanon in Montana (2021) by NRCS Montana

There are at least 12 named mountains in Liberty County, Montana.

- Black Jack Butte, 48°53′57″N 111°06′21″W, el. 5,200 feet (1,600 m)
- Devils Chimney, 48°51′40″N 111°06′57″W, el. 5,515 feet (1,681 m)
- East Butte, 48°51′39″N 111°06′56″W, el. 5,499 feet (1,676 m)
- Hawley Hill, 48°54′05″N 111°13′42″W, el. 4,468 feet (1,362 m)
- Haystack Butte, 48°47′18″N 111°12′28″W, el. 4,498 feet (1,371 m)
- Ikes Butte, 48°58′42″N 111°10′36″W, el. 4,147 feet (1,264 m)
- McGuire Hill, 48°45′42″N 111°07′18″W, el. 4,006 feet (1,221 m)
- Morgan Hill, 48°55′45″N 111°11′31″W, el. 4,190 feet (1,280 m)
- Mount Brown, 48°52′26″N 111°08′21″W, el. 6,922 feet (2,110 m)
- Mount Lebanon, 48°52′05″N 111°03′39″W, el. 5,725 feet (1,745 m)
- Mount Lily, 48°56′07″N 111°05′50″W, el. 4,239 feet (1,292 m)
- Mount Royal, 48°51′15″N 111°08′28″W, el. 6,844 feet (2,086 m)

== See also ==
- List of mountains in Montana
