= Monticello–Bloomfield Border Crossing =

Canada–United States border crossing

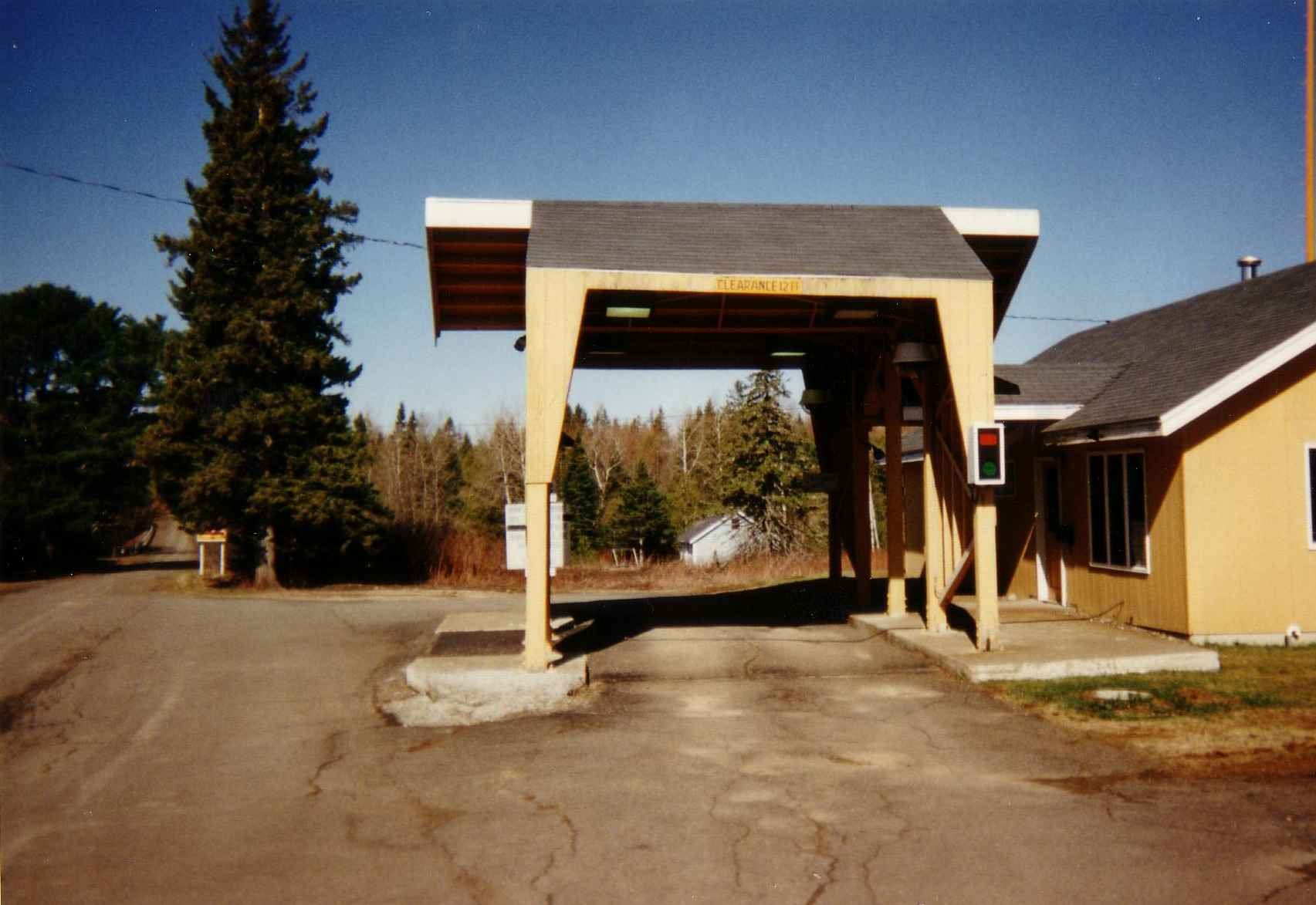
- The US Border Inspection Station at Monticello, Maine as seen in 1996.

Locaiton
- Country: United States; Canada
- Location: Fletcher Road / Line Road; US Port: 590 Fletcher Road, Monticello, ME 04760; Canadian Port: 185 Line Road, Bloomfield NB E7K 1C5
- Coordinates: 46.317568°N 67.78264°W

Details
- Opened: 1939

Website
- www.cbp.gov/contact/ports/houlton-maine-0106

The Monticello–Bloomfield Border Crossing connects the towns of Monticello, Maine and Bloomfield, New Brunswick on the Canada–US border.

This crossing is not heavily trafficked, and is among the few that is not open on Sundays. The inspection canopy shown in this photo was dismantled shortly after the photo was taken in 1996. The border station has since been painted grey. A Remote Video Inspection System operated at this location between 1997 and 2001 to enable people to enter the US when the border station was not open. In 2002, a gate was installed to prevent people from crossing when the border stations are closed.

== History ==
The US originally built a red brick border station at this crossing in 1937. In 1974, local residents organized to oppose its replacement, citing that the original border station was an "architecturally attractive landmark." The US Customs Service informed the group that if the station could not be upgraded, it would be closed. At that point, opposition to the replacement diminished and a new wooden structure was built in 1975.

Canada last upgraded its border station at Bloomfield in 1991.

== See also ==
- List of Canada–United States border crossings
