= West Butte (Montana) =

Mountain in Montana, United States

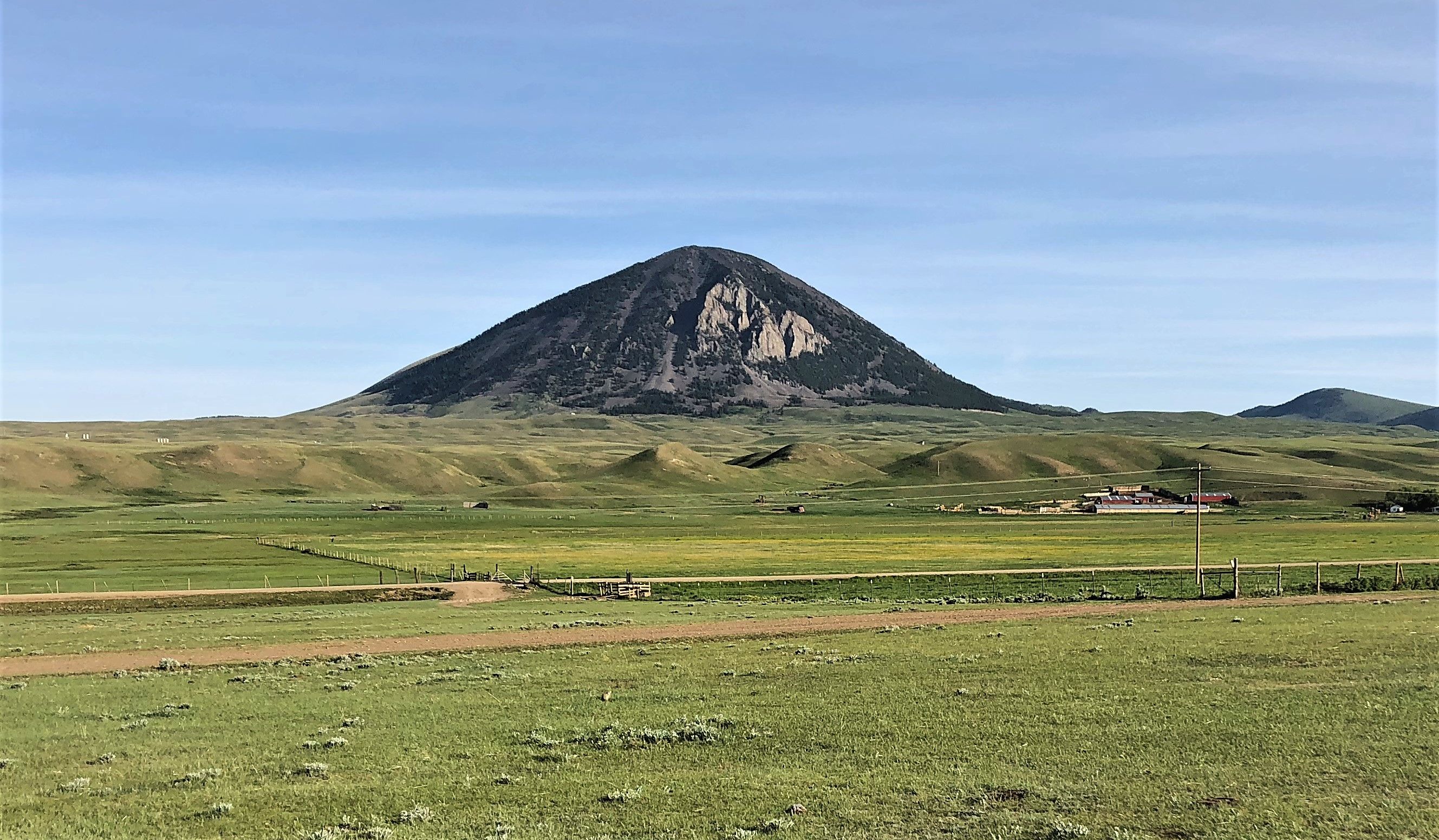
- Southeast aspect

Highest point
- Elevation: 6,983 ft (2,128 m)
- Prominence: 3,638 ft (1,109 m)
- Parent peak: Kupunkamint Mountain (8,802 ft)
- Isolation: 81.27 mi (130.79 km)
- Listing: Most Isolated Summits in US
- Coordinates: 48°55′54″N 111°32′01″W

Geography
- Location within Montana Location within the United States
- Country: United States
- State: Montana
- County: Toole
- Parent range: Sweet Grass Hills
- Topo map: USGS West Butte

Geology
- Rock age: Eocene
- Mountain type: Laccolith
- Rock type: Igneous rock

Climbing
- Easiest route: class 2

West Butte is a 6,983-foot-elevation (2,128-meter) mountain summit located in Toole County, Montana, United States.

== Description ==
West Butte is the highest peak in the Sweet Grass Hills and the highest in the county. It is situated 34 miles (55 km) north-northeast of Shelby, Montana, and four miles (6.4 km) south of the Canada–United States border, on land administered by the Bureau of Land Management. Precipitation runoff from the mountain drains south to the Marias River and north to the Milk River. Topographic relief is significant as the summit rises 3,000 feet (910 meters) above the surrounding plains in 2.5 miles (4.0 km) which makes it a prominent landmark visible for many miles.

== Geology ==
West Butte is an exposed laccolith composed of diorite porphyry and monzonite which was created by an igneous intrusion through older Mississippian sedimentary rocks during the Eocene, about 50 million years ago. These sedimentary rocks are primarily limestone and shale. Over time, erosion of the sedimentary rock has exposed the solidified laccolith which is more resistant to weathering.

== History ==
The Sweet Grass Hills, which are centered in buffalo hunting territory, are sacred to the Blackfoot and other tribes. The Blackfoot called West Butte "ami sítse katúyis" which means "west side sweet pine." In 1806, Meriwether Lewis sighted West Butte from the Missouri River, which is 100 miles (160 km) distant, and George Mercer Dawson reported seeing it from 140 miles (230 km) away at Blackfoot Crossing in Alberta. The landform's toponym has been officially adopted by the United States Board on Geographic Names.

== Climate ==
Based on the Köppen climate classification, West Butte is located in a semi-arid climate zone with long, cold, dry winters and hot summers with cool nights. Winter temperatures can drop below −10 °F with wind chill factors below −30 °F. The wettest period of the year is generally May through August, with up to 20 inches of precipitation falling annually on the peak.

West Butte peak has a dry winter subarctic climate (Köppen Dwc).

Climate data for West Butte (MT) 48.9319 N, 111.5336 W, Elevation: 6,598 ft (2,011 m) (1991–2020 normals)
Month	Jan	Feb	Mar	Apr	May	Jun	Jul	Aug	Sep	Oct	Nov	Dec	Year
Mean daily maximum °F (°C)	28.7 (−1.8)	29.1 (−1.6)	34.0 (1.1)	41.5 (5.3)	50.9 (10.5)	58.7 (14.8)	69.1 (20.6)	69.5 (20.8)	60.0 (15.6)	46.4 (8.0)	32.8 (0.4)	27.6 (−2.4)	45.7 (7.6)
Daily mean °F (°C)	21.9 (−5.6)	20.9 (−6.2)	24.8 (−4.0)	31.1 (−0.5)	40.2 (4.6)	47.4 (8.6)	56.5 (13.6)	56.7 (13.7)	48.1 (8.9)	36.6 (2.6)	26.4 (−3.1)	21.2 (−6.0)	36.0 (2.2)
Mean daily minimum °F (°C)	15.0 (−9.4)	12.7 (−10.7)	15.6 (−9.1)	20.8 (−6.2)	29.4 (−1.4)	36.2 (2.3)	44.0 (6.7)	44.0 (6.7)	36.2 (2.3)	26.8 (−2.9)	20.0 (−6.7)	14.8 (−9.6)	26.3 (−3.2)
Average precipitation inches (mm)	0.73 (19)	0.68 (17)	1.04 (26)	1.75 (44)	2.77 (70)	6.07 (154)	2.40 (61)	2.47 (63)	2.22 (56)	1.77 (45)	0.96 (24)	0.70 (18)	23.56 (597)
Source: PRISM Climate Group

== See also ==
- Gold Butte (Middle Butte)
- Mount Lebanon (East Butte)

== Gallery ==
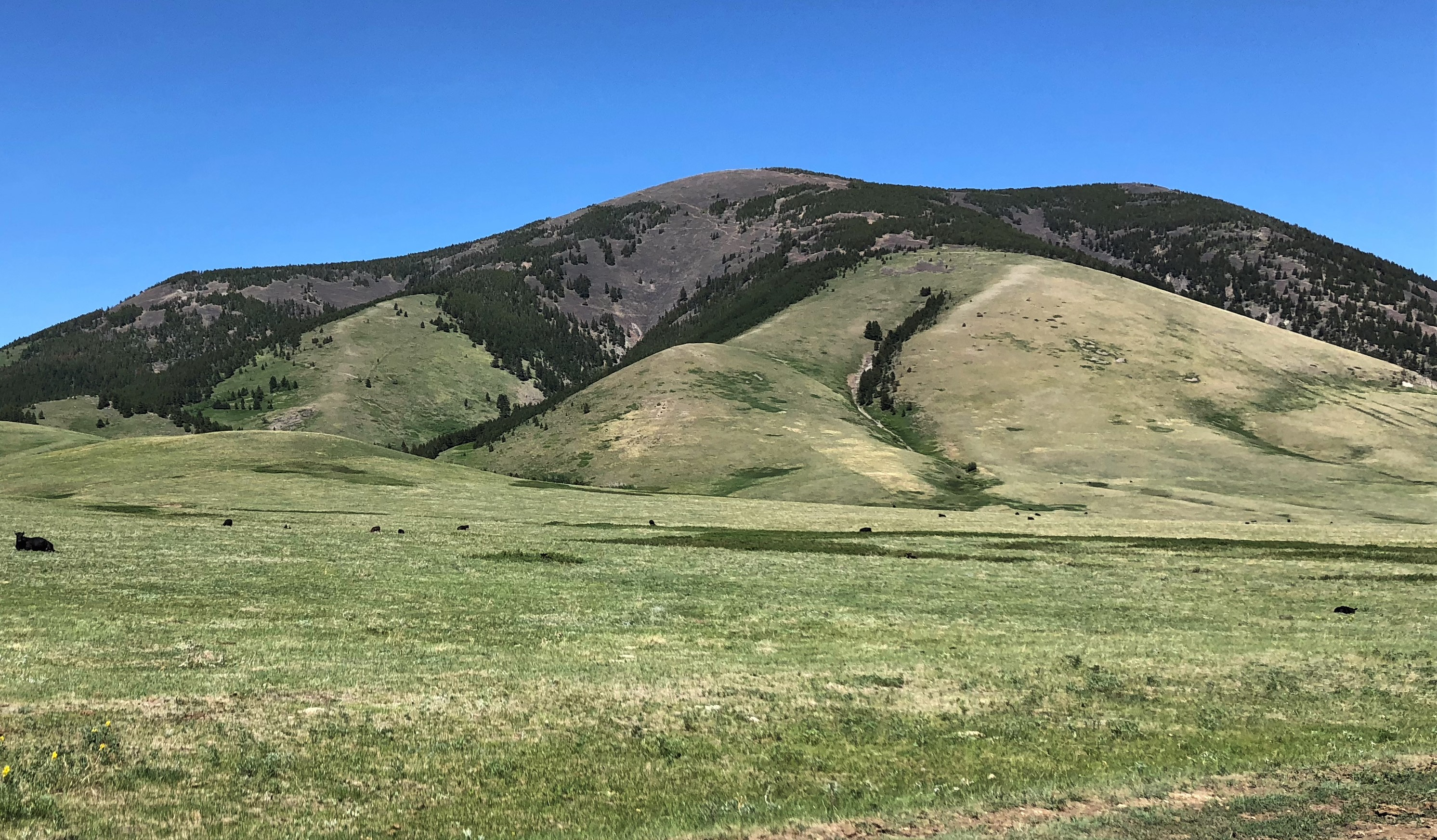
Southwest aspect

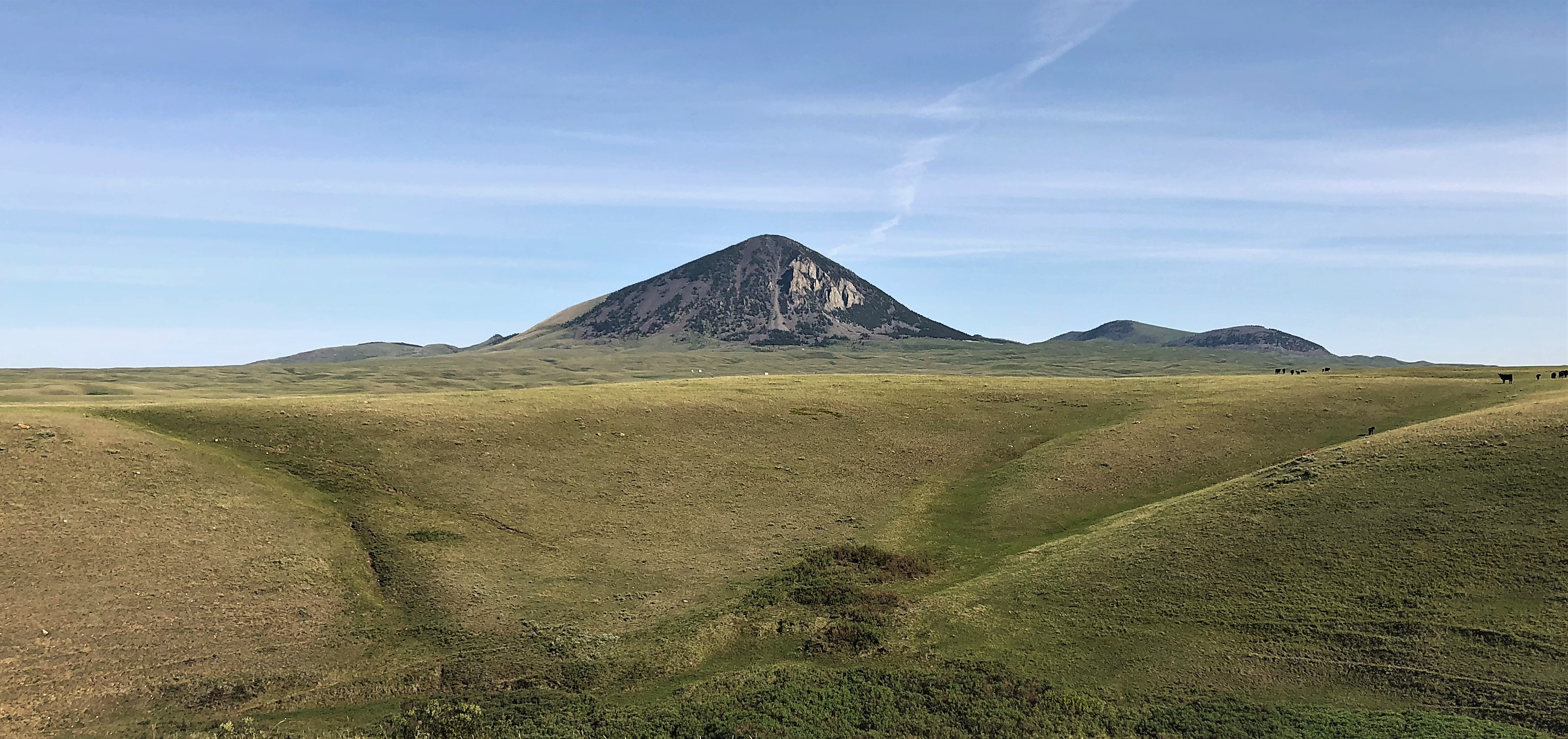
Southeast aspect

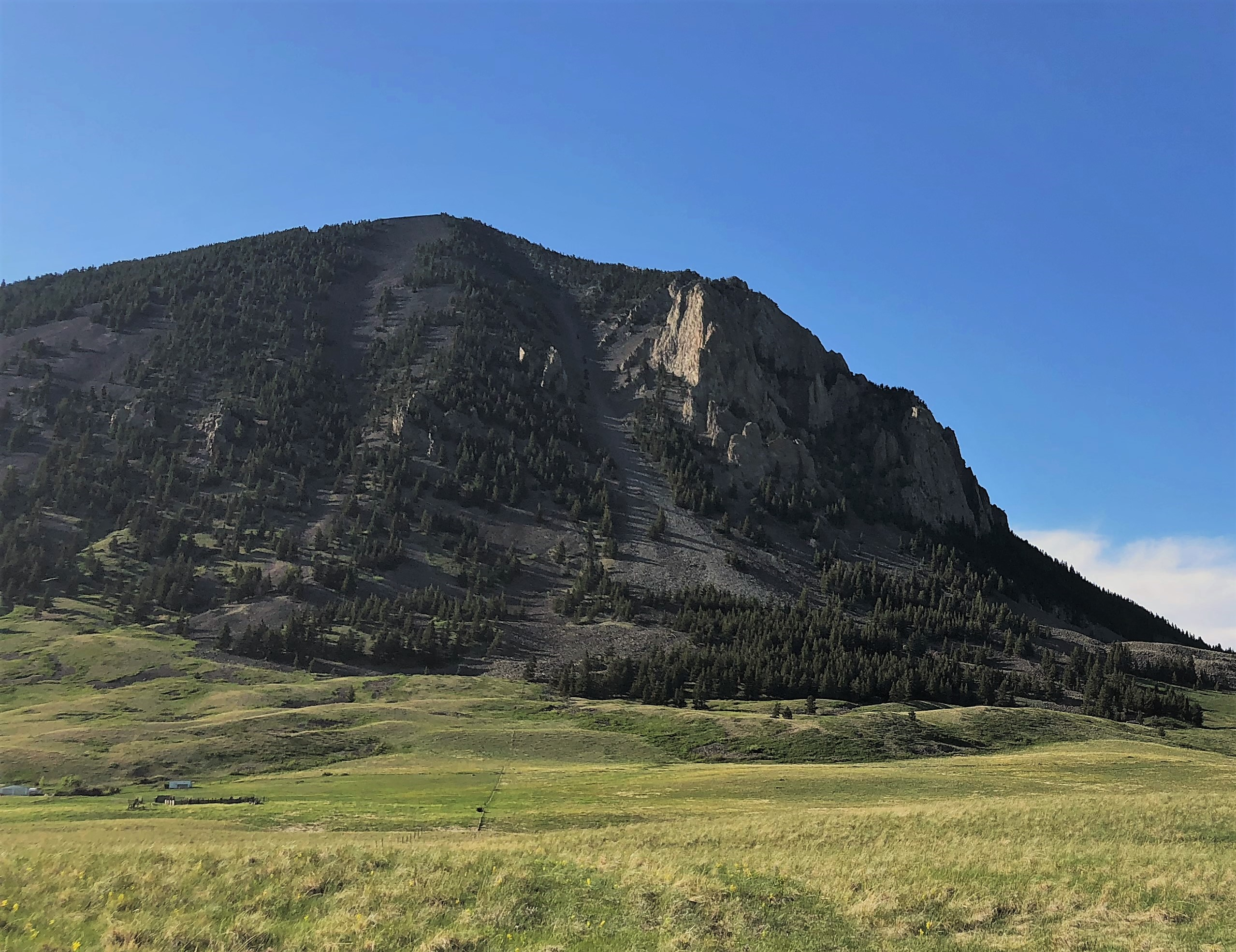
South aspect

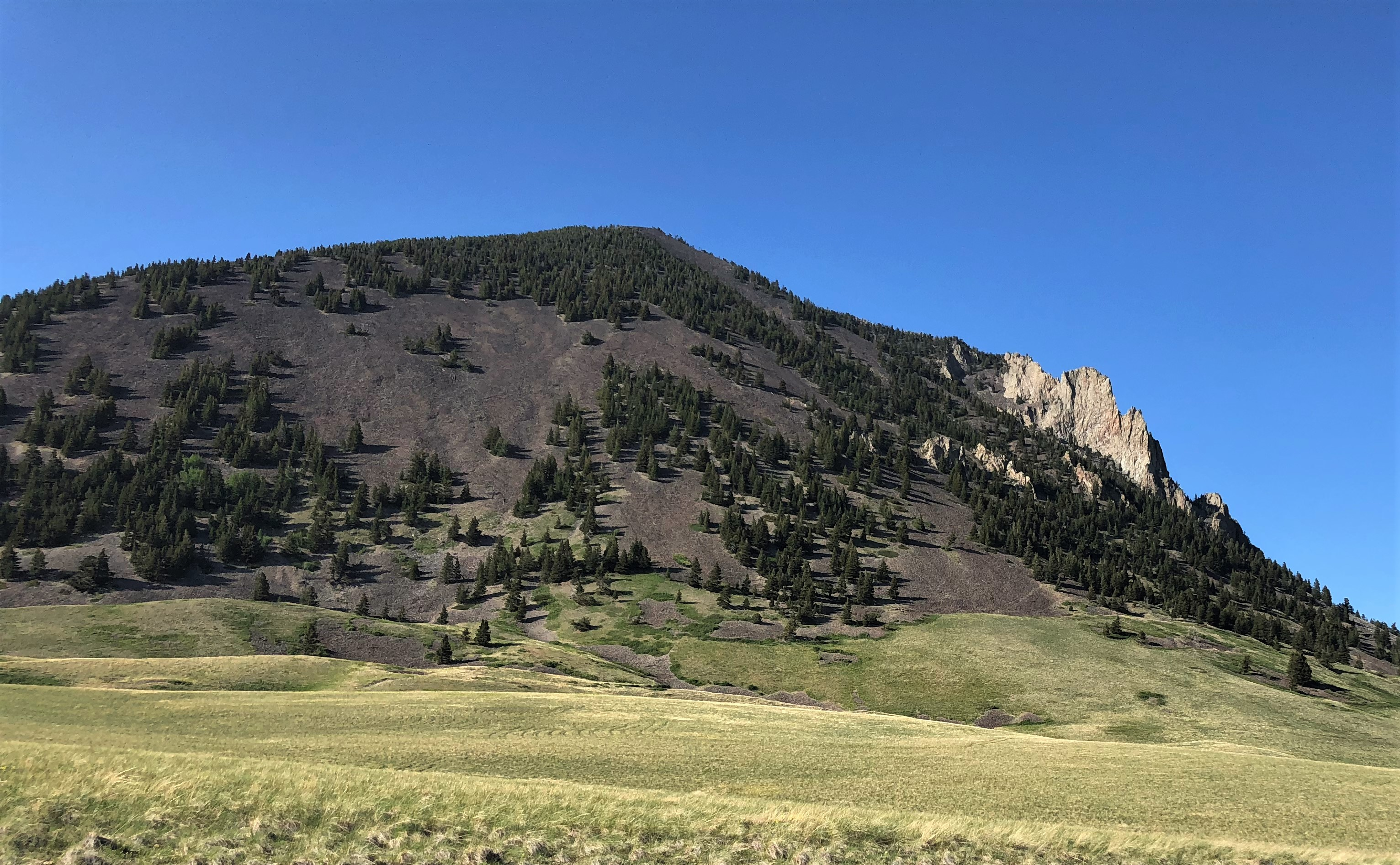
West Butte

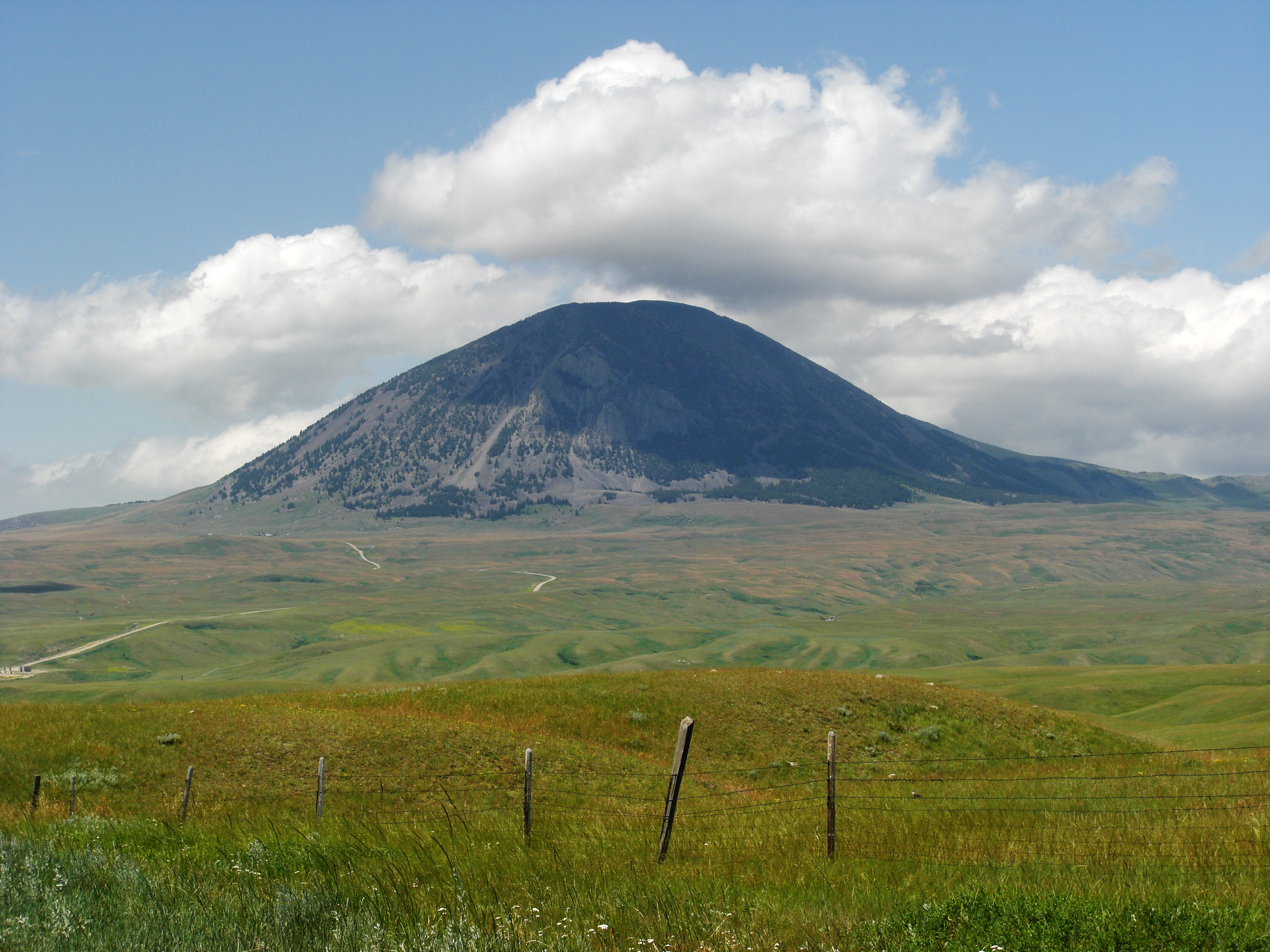
West Butte
