= Whitlash–Aden Border Crossing =

Border crossing between Canada and the United States

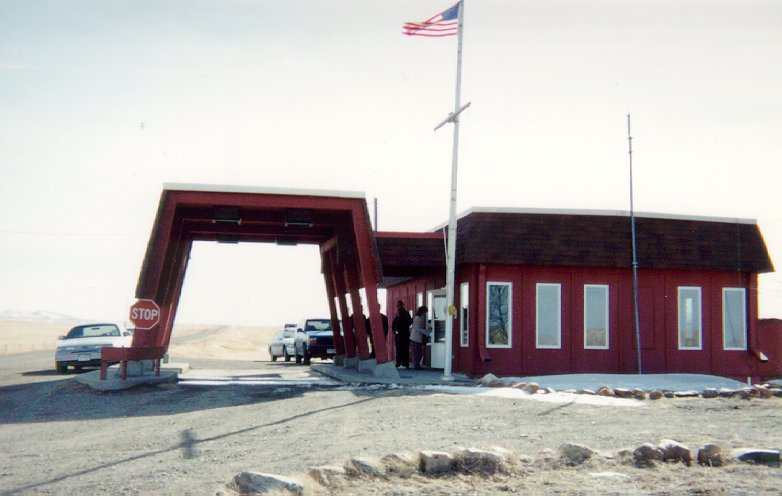
- US Border Inspection Station at Whitlash, Montana, 1999, which was replaced in 2012.

Locaiton
- Country: United States; Canada
- Location: S-409 / Highway 880; US Port: 10 Whitlash Road, Whitlash, Montana 59545; Canadian Port: Highway #880 South, Aden, Alberta T0K 0A0
- Coordinates: 48°59′50″N 111°15′31″W

Details
- Opened: 1929

Website
- US Canadian

The Whitlash–Aden Border Crossing connects Whitlash, Montana with Aden, Alberta on the Canada–United States border. Montana Secondary Highway 409 on the American side joins Alberta Highway 880 on the Canadian side. Neither of these highway approaches are paved, which is rare for a crossing.

== Canadian side ==
In terms of the region, the earliest customs service began at Pendant d'Oreille in the early 1900s, where the North-West Mounted Police (NWMP) collected duties and patrolled the border. A customs office existed at Pinhorn 1913–1929 under the administrative oversight of the Port of Lethbridge, but retaining staff was a problem.

In 1929, the office moved without authority about 18 kilometres (11 mi) eastward along the border. The new location was about 8 kilometres (5 mi) north of the present office. The change became official in 1930, but a suitable location and staff retention remained a problem. In 1934, the office moved to the border site, where a combined residence/office was built.

In 1973, a white steel building was erected to provide a more permanent structure, to which an inspection canopy was added in 2012. Two officers staff each shift.

== US side ==
Established in 1929, the US Customs office was within the old Whitlash Ranchers' Cash Store, a building which still stands in the settlement. In the 1940s, a new facility was erected. In the 1960s, the inspection function moved to the border site, where the building was replaced by a red wooden structure in 1974.

Averaging just two vehicles per day in 2009, this was the least frequented of all the land border crossings at the time. In 2012, the border station was replaced. Improvements included a connected heated inspection shed, separate relief quarters for temporary housing, and 100 yards of paved roadway.

By 2017, vehicle crossings had almost doubled. During the bleak 2017/18 winter, bad weather prevented staff from reaching the border to open the office. Two officers staff each shift. During 2019, 1,149 people crossed into tiny Whitlash from tiny Aden, still qualifying as the least traversed of all US border crossings.

To compensate for minimal local activity, Whitlash is the central office for processing the documentation for all personal vehicle exports from Idaho and Montana.

== See also ==
- List of Canada–United States border crossings
