= Ferry, Washington =

Ghost town in Washington (state)

- Ghost town
- Location within Washington (state) Location within the United States
- Coordinates: 48°59′59″N 118°45′39″W
- Country: United States
- State: Washington
- County: Ferry
- Founded: 1890s
- Time zone: UTC-8 (Pacific (PST))
  - Summer (DST): UTC-7 (PDT)

Ferry is a ghost town in Ferry County, Washington, United States. Ferry was founded during the late 1890s. The town was located to the west of Vulcan Mountain. Ferry was a ramshackle collection of crude log homes and false front buildings to support the mining boom in the area. By 1910, insurance fires took their toll and before long Ferry had passed into oblivion. Today little remains of the town.

== See also ==
- Ferry-Midway Border Crossing
