= Sky island =

Geographic or environmental feature

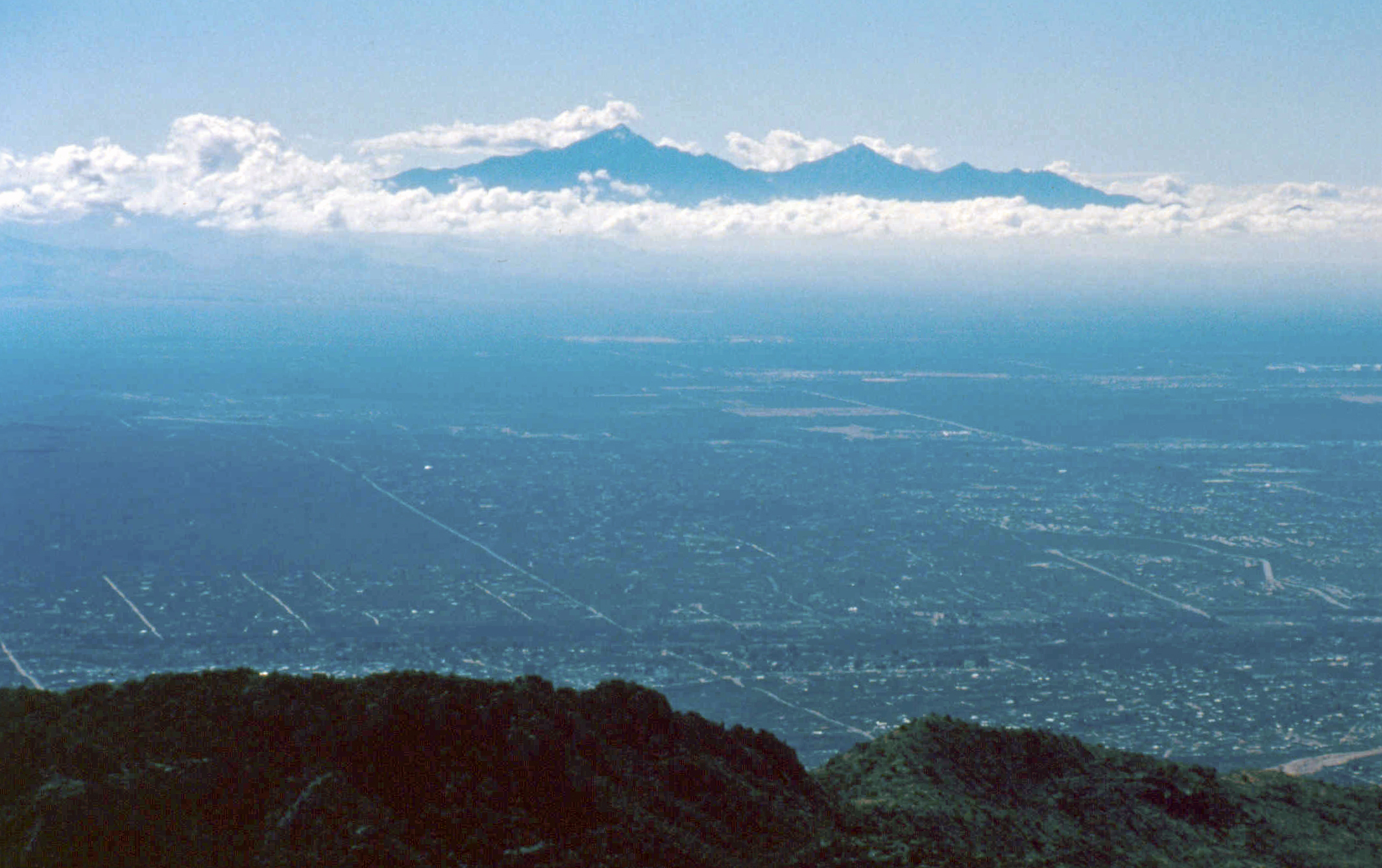
View of the Santa Rita Mountains across the Tucson valley from the Santa Catalina Mountains. The Santa Ritas are among the most prominent of the "sky islands" in southern Arizona.

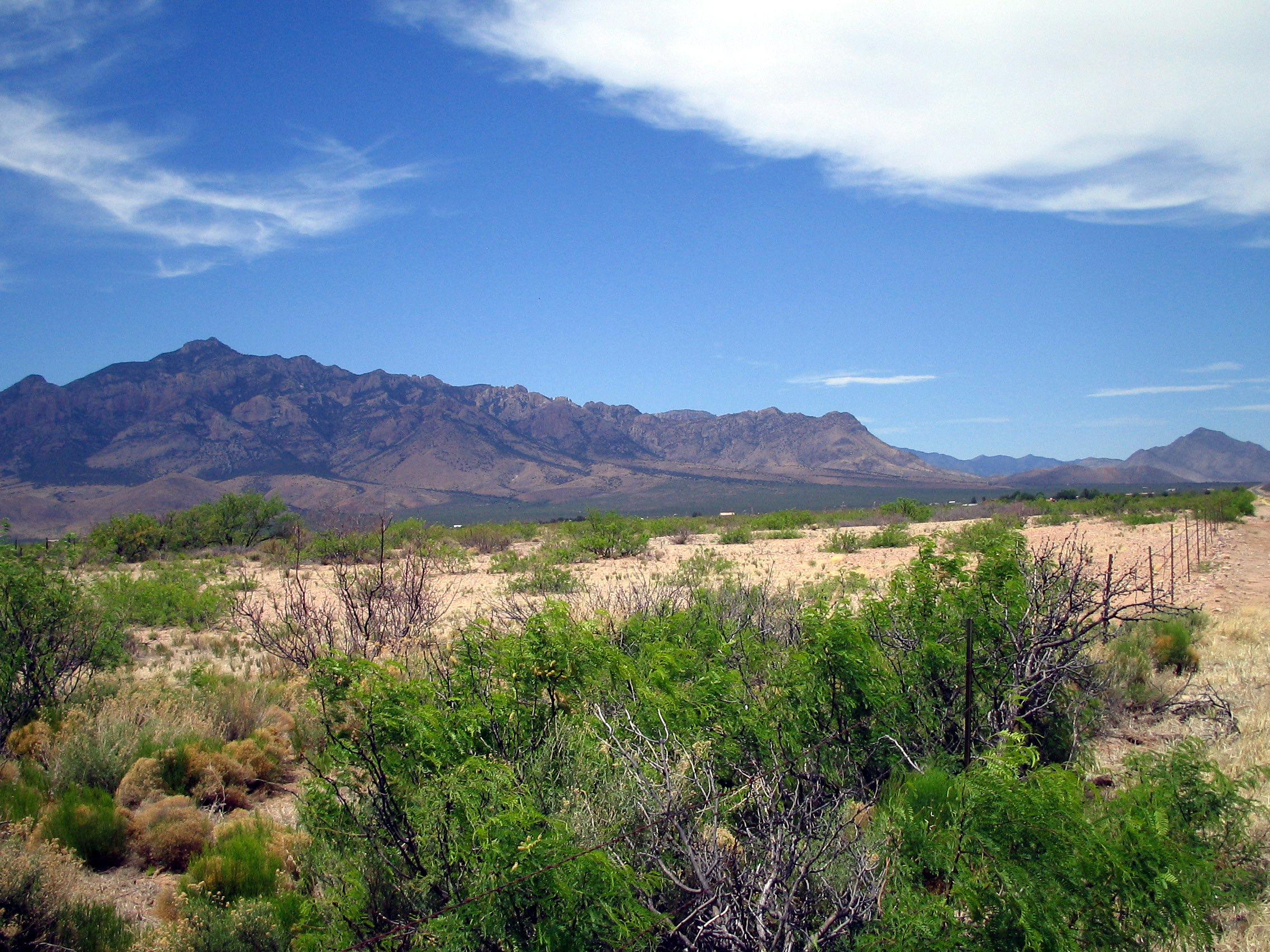
The 2,700 m (9,000 ft) Chiricahua Mountains above the desert

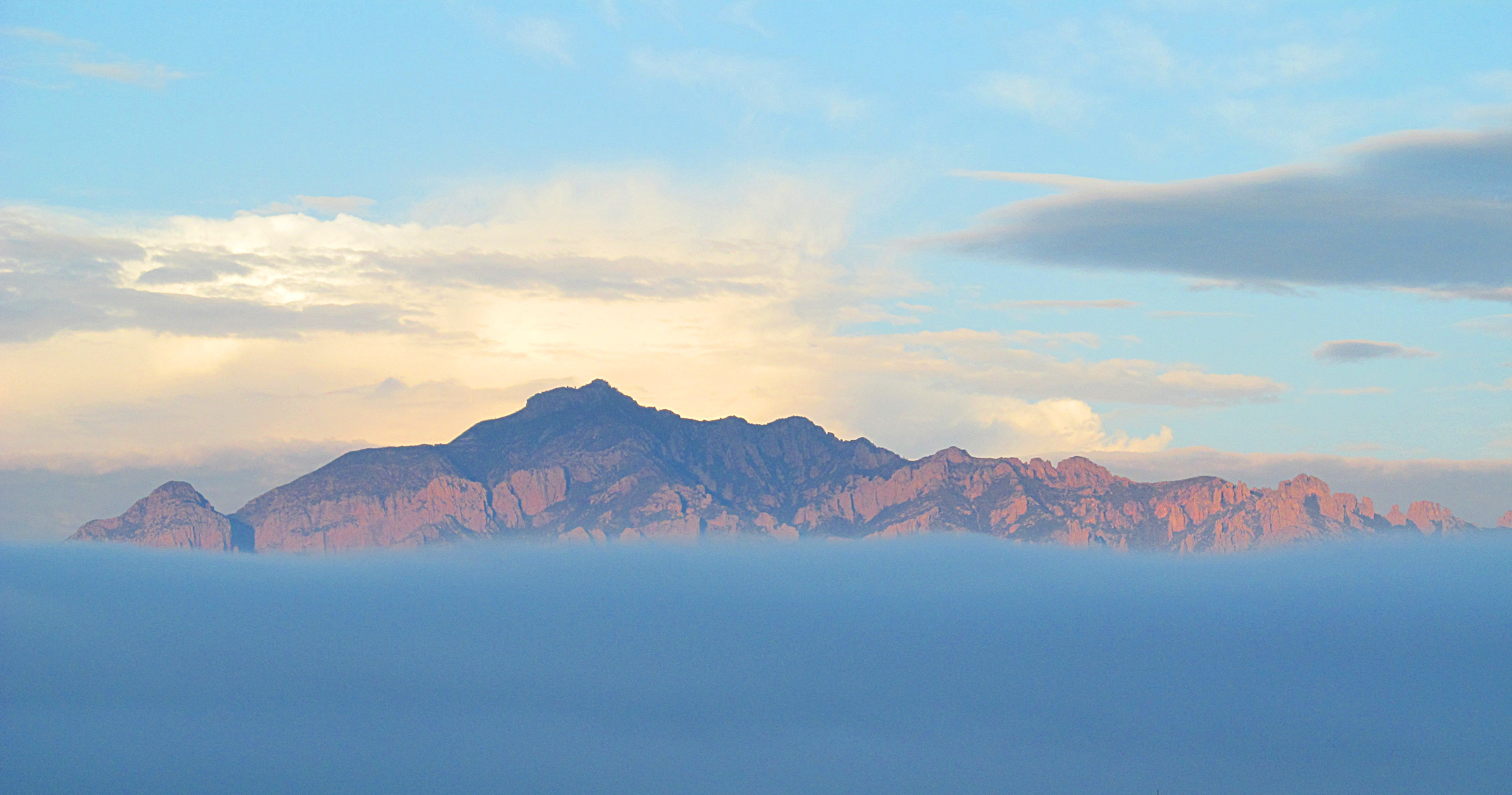
The 2,400 m (8,000 ft) Portal Peak in the Chiricahua Mountains surrounded by clouds

Sky islands are isolated mountains surrounded by radically different lowland environments. The term originally referred to those found on the Mexican Plateau and has extended to similarly isolated high-elevation forests. The isolation has significant implications for these natural habitats. Endemism, altitudinal migration, and relict populations are some of the natural phenomena to be found on sky islands.

The complex dynamics of species richness on sky islands draw attention from the discipline of biogeography, and likewise the biodiversity is of concern to conservation biology. One of the key elements of a sky island is separation by physical distance from other mountain ranges, resulting in a habitat island, such as a forest surrounded by desert.

Some sky islands serve as refugia for boreal species stranded by warming climates since the last glacial period. In other cases, localized populations of plants and animals tend towards speciation, similar to oceanic islands such as the Galápagos Islands of Ecuador.

== Etymology ==
Herpetologist Edward H. Taylor presented the concept of "Islands" on the Mexican Plateau in 1940 at the 8th American Scientific Congress in Washington, D.C. His abstract on the topic was published in 1942.

The sky island concept was later applied in 1943 when Natt N. Dodge, in an article in Arizona Highways magazine, referred to the Chiricahua Mountains in southeastern Arizona as a "mountain island in a desert sea".

In about the same era, the term was used to refer to high alpine, unglaciated, ancient topographic landform surfaces on the crest of the Sierra Nevada, California.

The term was popularized by nature writer Weldon Heald, a resident of southeastern Arizona. In his 1967 book Sky Island, he demonstrated the concept by describing a drive from the town of Rodeo, New Mexico, in the western Chihuahuan desert, to a peak in the Chiricahua Mountains, 56 km (35 miles) away and 1,700 m (5,600 ft) higher in elevation, ascending from the hot, arid desert, to grasslands, then to oak–pine woodland, pine forest, and finally to spruce-fir-aspen forest. His book mentions the concept of a biome but prefers the terminology of life zones and makes reference to the work of Clinton Hart Merriam. The book also describes the wildlife and living conditions of the Chiricahuas.

Around the same time, the idea of mountains as islands of habitat took hold with scientists and has been used by such popular writers as David Quammen and John McPhee. This concept falls within the study of island biogeography. It is not limited to mountains in southwestern North America but can be applied to mountains, highlands, and massifs around the world.

== Characteristics ==
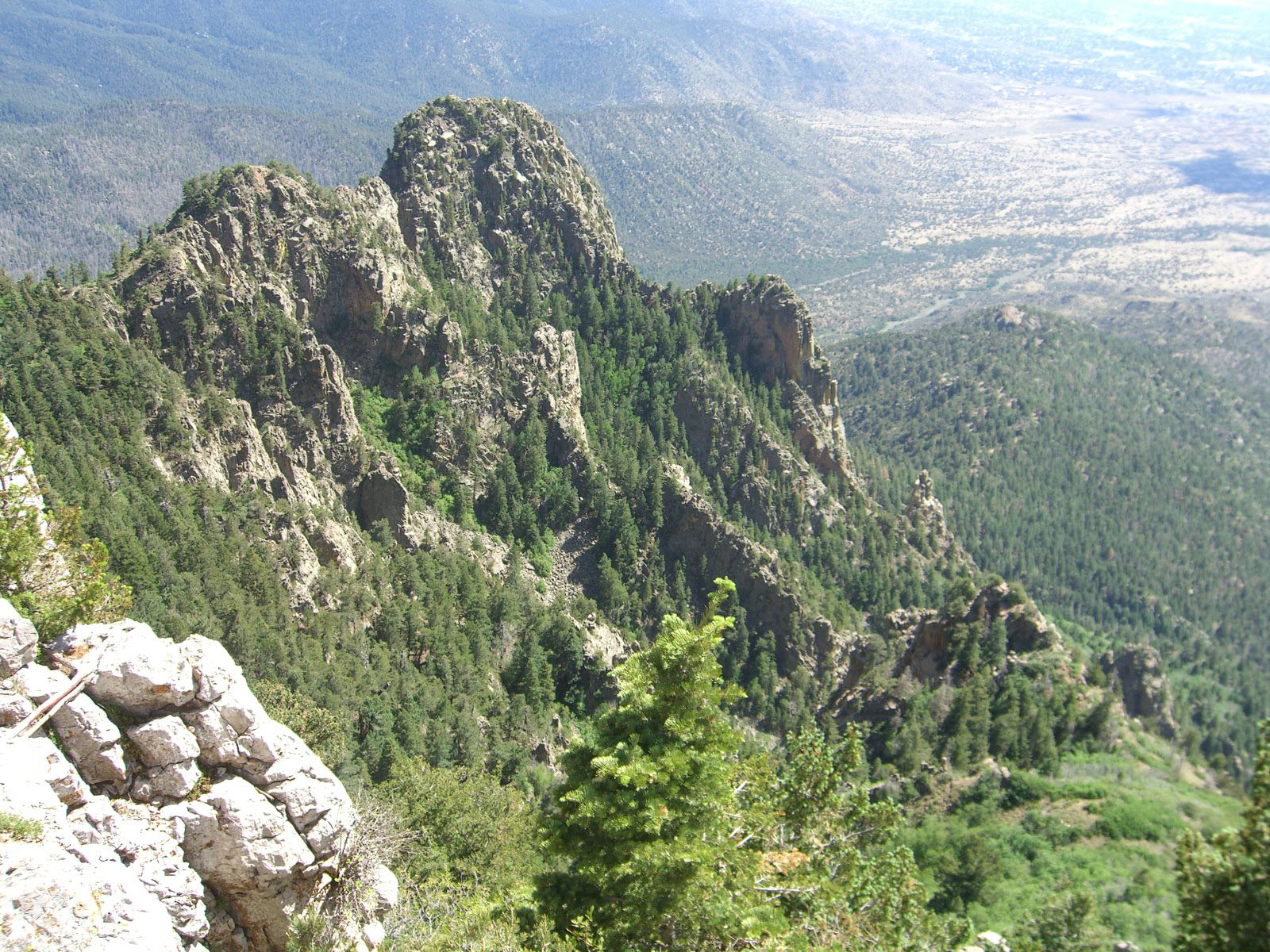
View from the Sandia Mountains at 10,378 feet (3,163 m) showing the transition to the desert at 6,000 feet (1,800 m) below

The Madrean sky islands are probably the most studied sky islands in the world. Found in the U.S. states of New Mexico and Arizona and the Mexican states of Chihuahua and Sonora, these numerous mountains form links in a chain connecting the northern end of the Sierra Madre Occidental and the southern Colorado Plateau. Sky islands of the central and northern mountains in the United States are often called island ranges, especially by populations within view of such islands of mountains surrounded by plains such as those found within the Wichita Mountains of southwestern Oklahoma.

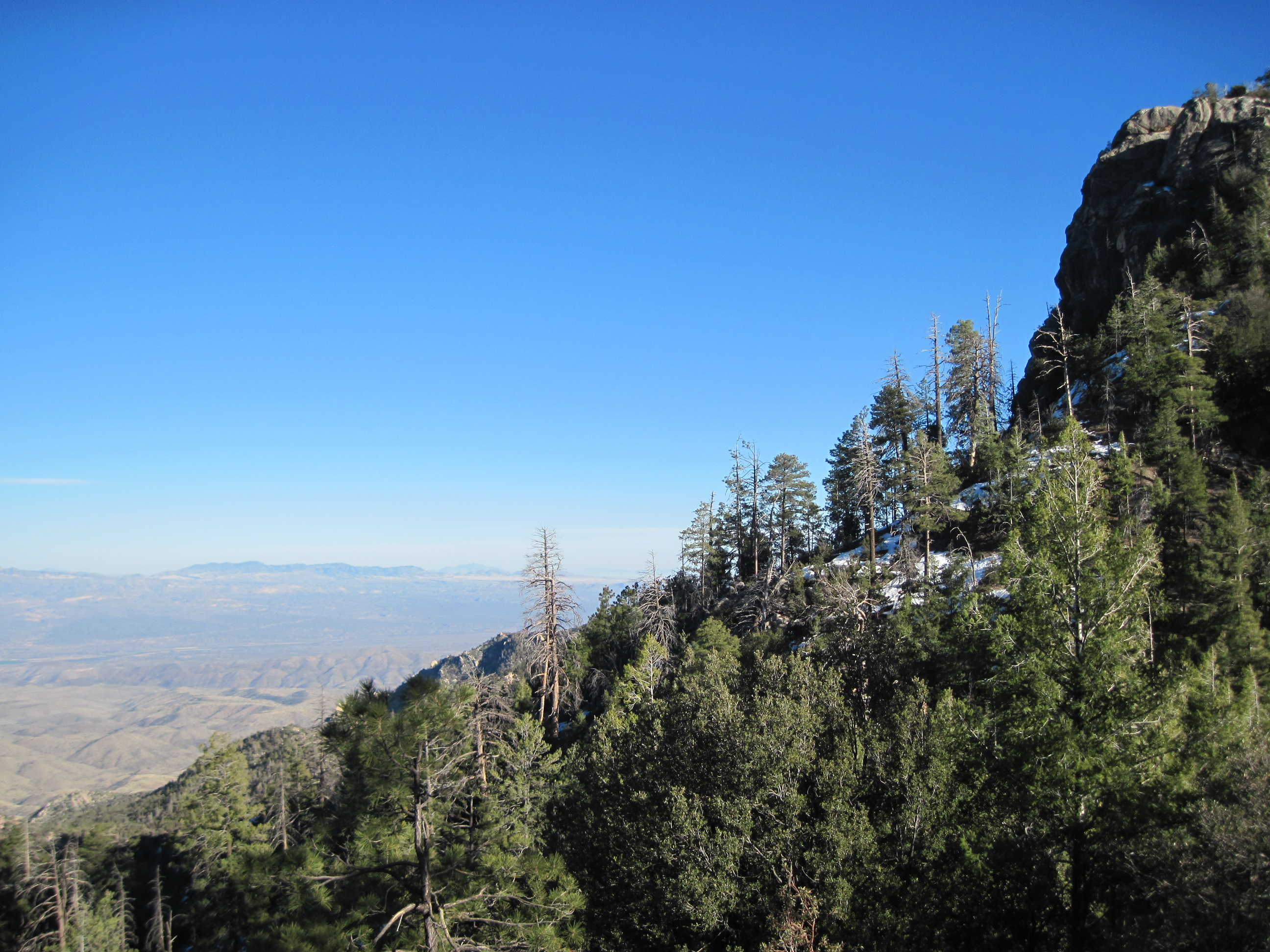
View from above 2,100 m (7,000 ft) in the Santa Catalina Mountains, showing pines and snow in the foreground and desert beyond

Some more northerly examples are the Crazy Mountains, Castle Mountains, Bears Paw Mountains, Highwood Mountains, and Little Rocky Mountains, all in the US state of Montana. Each of these ranges is forested and has tundra and snowpack above treeline, but is not connected to any other range by forested ridges; the ranges are completely surrounded by treeless prairie and/or semi-arid scrubland below. Other well-known sky islands of North America are the Great Basin montane forests, such as the White Mountains in California, and the Spring Mountains near Las Vegas, Nevada. One of the unique aspects of the sky islands of the U.S.-Mexico border region is the mix of floristic affinities, that is, the trees and plants of higher elevations are more characteristic of northern latitudes, while the flora of the lower elevations has ties to the desert and the mountains further south. Some unique plants and animals are found in these sky islands, such as the mountain yucca, Mount Graham red squirrel, Huachuca springsnail, and Jemez Mountains salamander.

Some montane species apparently evolved within their current range, adapting to their local environment, such as the Mount Lyell shrew. However, it has also been noted that some isolated mountain ecosystems have a tendency to lose species over time, perhaps because small, insularized populations are vulnerable to the forces of extinction, and the isolation of the habitat reduces the possibility of colonization by new species. Furthermore, some species, such as the grizzly bear, require a range of habitats. These bears historically made use of the forests and meadows found in the Madrean sky islands, as well as lower-elevation habitats such as riparian zones. (Grizzlies were extirpated from the region in the 20th century.) Seasonal movements between highland and lowland habitats can be a kind of migration, such as that undertaken by the mountain quail of the Great Basin mountains. These birds live in high elevations when free of snow, and instead of migrating south for the winter, they migrate down.

Confusing the matter somewhat is the potential for an archipelago of sky islands or even the valleys between them to act not only as a barrier to biological dispersal, but also as a path for migration. Examples of birds and mammals making use of the Madrean archipelago to extend their ranges northward are the elegant trogon and white-nosed coati.

== List by terrestrial realms ==
=== Afrotropical realm ===
- Cal Madow
- Cameroonian Highlands forests
- Ethiopian Highlands
- Highlands of southern Africa
- Green Mountain of Ascension Island
- Guinea Highlands
  - Nimba Range
- Mount Cameroon and Bioko montane forests
- Mount Kilimanjaro
- Mount Gorongosa
- Rwenzori Mountains

=== Australasian realm ===
- Mount Wilhelm
- Mount Taranaki
- Waitakere Ranges

=== Indomalayan realm ===
- Mount Jerai
- Fansipan
- Jade Mountain
- Mount Kinabalu
- Nat Ma Taung
- Central Highlands (Vietnam)
- Titiwangsa Mountains
- Western Ghats

=== Nearctic realm ===
- Animas Mountains
- Black Range
- Capitan Mountains
- Chiricahua Mountains
- Chisos Mountains
- Chuska Mountains
- Davis Mountains
- Florida Mountains
- Franklin Mountains (Texas)
- Great Basin montane forests
- Guadalupe Mountains
- Madrean sky islands
- Manzano Mountains
- Mogollon Mountains
- Mount Taylor (New Mexico)
- Organ Mountains
- Oscura Mountains
- Peloncillo Mountains
- Quartz Mountains
- Ruby Mountains
- Sacramento Mountains (New Mexico)
- San Augustin Mountains
- Sandia Mountains
- San Francisco Peaks (Arizona)
- San Jacinto Mountains
- Santa Rosa Mountains
- Spring Mountains
- Steens Mountain
- Wichita Mountains

=== Neotropical realm ===
- Baja California
  - Sierra de la Laguna
  - Sierra de Juarez
  - Sierra San Pedro Mártir
- Cordillera of Central America
- Tepuis
- Serra do Mar
- Sierra Nevada de Santa Marta
- Hispaniolan mountain ranges
  - Baoruco Mountain Range, Dominican Republic
  - Cordillera Central, Dominican Republic
  - Massif de la Hotte, Haiti
  - Chaîne de la Selle, Haiti
- Sierra de Tamaulipas
- Venezuelan Coastal Range

=== Palearctic realm ===
- Aïr Mountains
- Altai Mountains
- Baikal Mountains
- Caucasus
- Tibesti Mountains
- Tien Shan

== See also ==
- Altitudinal zonation
- Life zone
- Holdridge life zones
- Inselberg or monadnock
- List of life zones by region
- Refugium (population biology)
- Table (landform)
- Tepui
