= Gold Butte (Montana) =

Mountain in Montana, United States

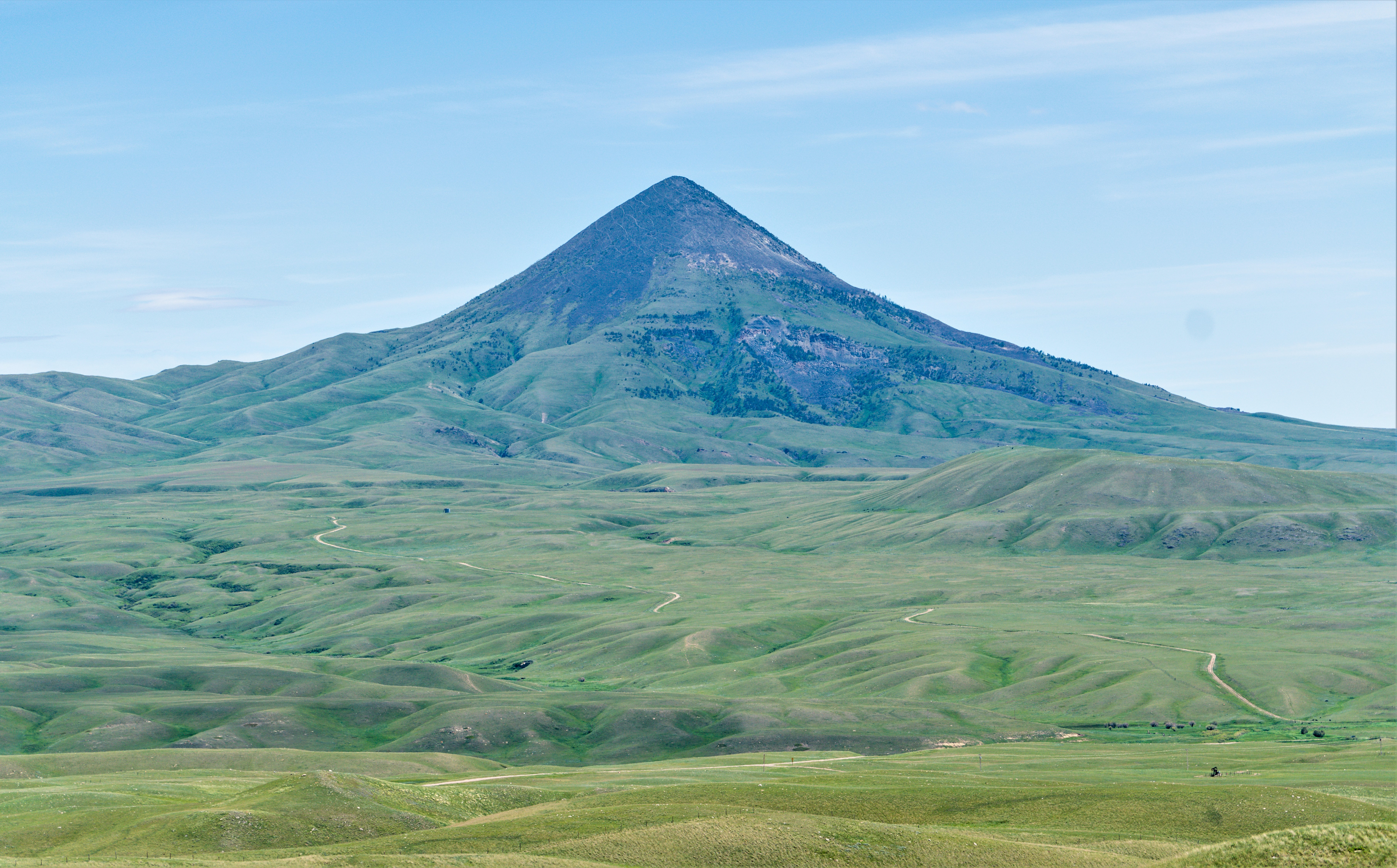
- Northwest aspect

Highest point
- Elevation: 6,512 ft (1,985 m)
- Prominence: 2,342 ft (714 m)
- Parent peak: Mount Royal (6,914 ft)
- Isolation: 9.17 mi (14.76 km)
- Coordinates: 48°50′53″N 111°22′30″W

Geography
- Location within Montana Location within the United States
- Country: United States
- State: Montana
- County: Toole
- Parent range: Sweet Grass Hills
- Topo map: USGS Grassy Butte

Geology
- Rock age: Eocene
- Mountain type: Laccolith
- Rock type: Igneous rock (Diorite)

Climbing
- Easiest route: class 2

Gold Butte is a 6,512-foot (1,985-metre) mountain summit located in Toole County, Montana, United States.

== Description ==
Gold Butte is part of the Sweet Grass Hills and ranks as the fourth-highest peak in the range, and second-highest in the county. It is situated 32 miles (51 km) northeast of Shelby, Montana, and 10 miles (16 km) south of the Canada–United States border, on land administered by the Bureau of Land Management. Precipitation runoff from the mountain drains south to the Marias River and north to the Milk River. Topographic relief is significant as the summit rises over 2,400 feet (730 meters) above the surrounding plains in less than two miles.

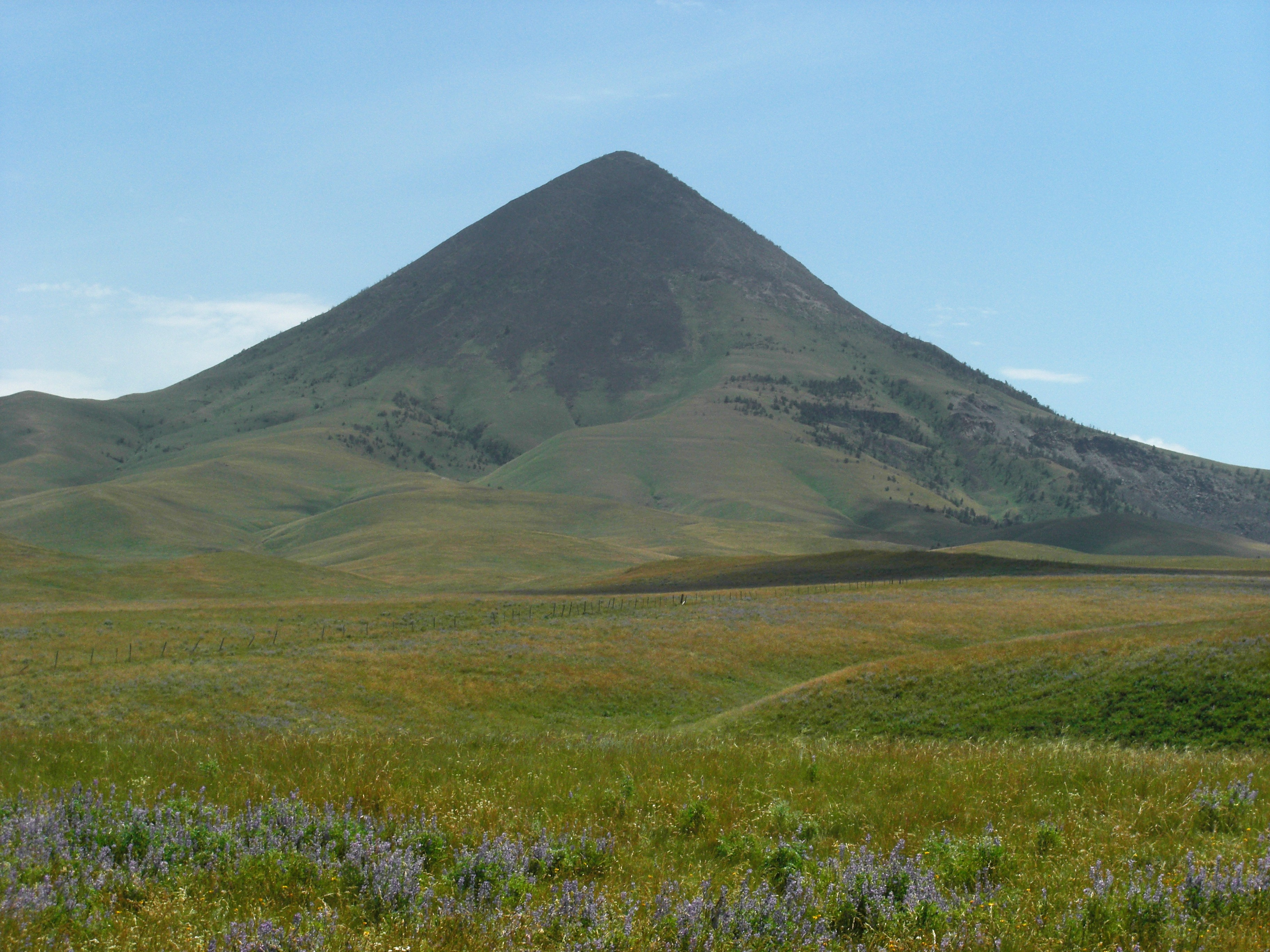
Gold Butte

== Geology ==
Gold Butte is an exposed laccolith composed of diorite porphyry which was created by an igneous intrusion through older Cretaceous sedimentary rocks during the Eocene, about 50 million years ago. Dikes and sills radiate across the conical mass. Over time, erosion of the sedimentary rock has exposed the solidified laccolith which is more resistant to weathering. Minor amounts of gold and silver were produced by placer mining in a gulch on the north slope during the late-19th and early-20th centuries. The yield was likely less than 2,000 ounces of gold.

== History ==
The Sweet Grass Hills are sacred to the Blackfoot and other tribes. Mountain Chief, Calf Tail, and Bull Lodge experienced their respective vision quests on Gold Butte. The ghost town of "Gold Butte" was a gold-mining camp located on the mountain's northwest slope after gold was discovered here in 1884. The landform's toponym has been officially adopted by the United States Board on Geographic Names.

== Climate ==
Based on the Köppen climate classification, Gold Butte is located in a semi-arid climate zone with long, cold, dry winters and hot summers with cool nights. Winter temperatures can drop below −10 °F with wind chill factors below −30 °F.

== See also ==
- West Butte
- List of mountains in Montana
