= Whitlash, Montana =

- Unincorporated community
- Location in Montana Location in the United States
- Coordinates: 48°54′32″N 111°15′07″W
- Country: United States
- State: Montana
- County: Liberty

Area
  - Total: 0.042 sq mi (0.11 km^{2})
  - Land: 0.042 sq mi (0.11 km^{2})
  - Water: 0 sq mi (0.00 km^{2})
- Elevation: 3,940 ft (1,200 m)

Population (2020)
  - Total: 4
  - Density: 91.7/sq mi (35.39/km^{2})
- Time zone: UTC-7 (Mountain (MST))
  - Summer (DST): UTC-6 (MDT)
- FIPS code: 30-80275
- GNIS feature ID: 2804310

Whitlash is an unincorporated community in northwestern Liberty County, Montana, United States, about five miles south of the province of Alberta across the Canada–US border.

Whitlash has a post office and an elementary school that provides educational services in grades prekindergarten through 8. The community is accessible only by unpaved road. The Whitlash–Aden Border Crossing is about five miles to the north. As of the 2020 census, Whitlash had a population of 4.

Whitlash is located near the East Butte of the Sweet Grass Hills which are major historic and physical landmarks of the Great Plains. Sacred to the American Indians, "The Hills" served as hunting grounds, battlegrounds, spiritual grounds, and of course were used for navigational purposes as well.

The post office opened in 1892. The post office moved 6 times, until Alfred and Tom Strode laid out a townsite on Half Breed Creek in 1905. U.S. Customs operated out of the town from 1933 until 1969, when it was moved to the actual border.

== Demographics ==
Historical population
Census	Pop.	Note	%±
2020	4		—
U.S. Decennial Census

In the 2020 census, there were 4 people in the CDP. The racial makeup of CDP was 75% White, and 25% from two or more races.

== See also ==
- Whitlash-Aden Border Crossing
