= Ferry–Midway Border Crossing =

Border crossing between Canada and the United States

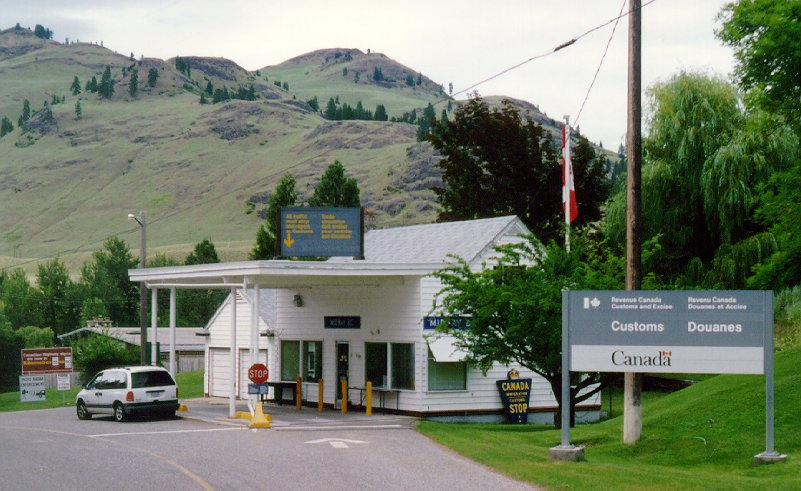
- Canada Border Inspection Station at Midway, BC

Location
- Country: United States; Canada
- Location: Customs Road / Dominion Street; US Port: 1377 Customs Road, Curlew, WA 99118; Canadian Port: 100 Dominion Street, Midway BC V0H 1M0
- Coordinates: 49°00′00″N 118°45′40″W

Details
- Opened: 1896

Website
- US Canadian
- U.S. Inspection Station – Ferry, Washington
- U.S. National Register of Historic Places
- MPS: U.S. Border Inspection Stations MPS
- NRHP reference No.: 14000611
- Added to NRHP: September 10, 2014

The Ferry–Midway Border Crossing connects the towns of Curlew, Washington and Midway, British Columbia on the Canada–US border. Customs Road on the American side joins Dominion Street on the Canadian side.

== Railways ==
In January 1900, the rail head of the Columbia and Western Railway, a Canadian Pacific Railway subsidiary, reached Midway, which would remain the western terminus for over a decade. In October 1905, the westward rail head of the Great Northern Railway (GN) from Curlew, Washington reached the border. The GN track west of Curlew was abandoned in 1935, eliminating this customs activity.

== Canadian side ==
In 1896, a customs postal collecting station was established. The next year, when a customs office assumed all customs activities, James Sutherland was the inaugural customs officer 1897–1899, until being suspended from duty. The Port of New Westminster provided administrative oversight, which transferred to the ports of Grand Forks in 1899, Greenwood in 1907, Grand Forks in 1924, and Nelson in 1936. During the earlier decades, the customs office was on the southwestern side of the road, immediately south of the Boundary Creek bridge. To commemorate a visit by the Prince of Wales in 1927, an oak tree was planted in front of that long demolished building.

The present Canada border station was built in 1951.

== US side ==
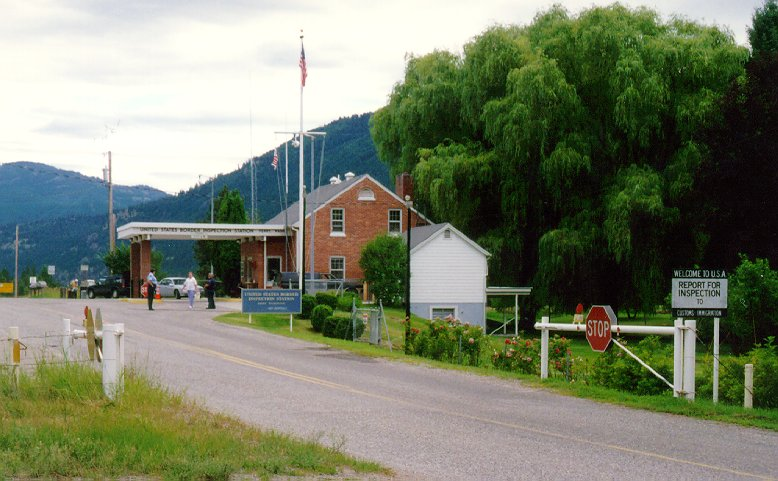
US Border Inspection Station in Ferry, WA, 1999

After the arrival of the GN, the population of Ferry, Washington waned to become a ghost town. The current US border station, built in 1936, was listed on the US National Register of Historic Places in 2014.

The Curlew Border Patrol Station, which opened in December 2003, patrols 39 miles (63 km) of border in Ferry and Okanogan Counties.

== See also ==
- List of Canada–United States border crossings
- National Register of Historic Places listings in Ferry County, Washington
