= Island range =

Isolated mountain range

An island range is a mountain range that exists in total or almost total isolation from a larger chain of ranges and sub-ranges. From a distance on the plains, these ranges appear as "islands" of higher ground. They are often described as islands of mountainous land because they exist in the "sea" of lower elevation and flatter prairie country; many examples are found in the northern Rocky Mountains of the United States. Island ranges include the Big Snowy Mountains of east-central Montana, the Crazy Mountains of south-central Montana, or the Wichita Mountains of southwestern Oklahoma. Island ranges, due to their isolation, often have animal and/or plant species or subspecies found nowhere else.

== See also ==
- Island biogeography
- Sky island
