= Mount Lebanon (Montana) =

Mountain in Montana, United States

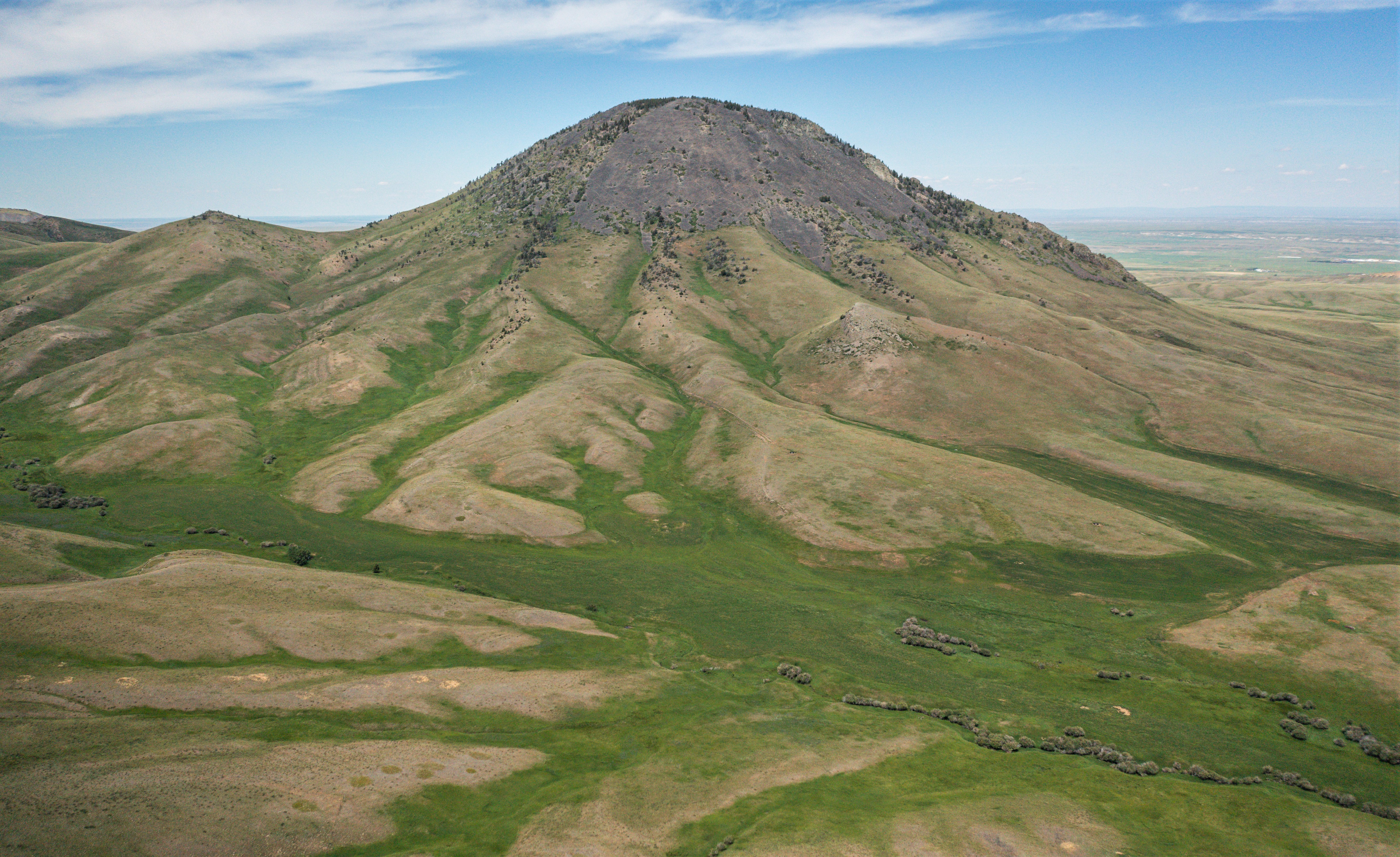
- South aspect

Highest point
- Elevation: 5,807 ft (1,770 m)
- Prominence: 957 ft (292 m)
- Parent peak: East Butte (5,885 ft)
- Isolation: 1.82 mi (2.93 km)
- Coordinates: 48°52′05″N 111°03′43″W

Geography
- Location within Montana Location within the United States
- Country: United States
- State: Montana
- County: Liberty
- Parent range: Sweet Grass Hills
- Topo map: USGS Mount Lebanon

Geology
- Rock age: Eocene
- Mountain type: Laccolith
- Rock type(s): Igneous rock, Syenite

Mount Lebanon is a 5,807-foot (1,770-metre) mountain summit in Liberty County, Montana, United States.

== Description ==
Mount Lebanon is part of the Sweet Grass Hills and ranks as the fifth-highest peak in the range, and fifth-highest in the county. It is situated 26 miles (42 km) north of Chester, Montana, and eight miles (13 km) south of the Canada–United States border. Precipitation runoff from the mountain drains into tributaries of the Milk River. Topographic relief is modest as the summit rises over 1,500 feet (460 meters) above the surrounding plains in one mile. The landform's toponym has been officially adopted by the United States Board on Geographic Names.

== Geology ==
Mount Lebanon is an exposed laccolith composed of diorite porphyry which was created by an igneous intrusion through older Cretaceous sedimentary rocks during the Eocene, about 50 million years ago. Over time, erosion of the sedimentary rock has exposed the solidified laccolith which is more resistant to weathering.

== Climate ==
Based on the Köppen climate classification, Mount Lebanon is located in a semi-arid climate zone with long, cold, dry winters and hot summers with cool nights. Winter temperatures can drop below −10 °F with wind chill factors below −30 °F.

== See also ==
- List of mountains in Liberty County, Montana
