= Altana Federal Credit Union =

- Type: Credit union
- Industry: Financial services
- Founded: 1949
- Headquarters: Billings, Montana, United States
- Area served: Montana and Northern Wyoming, United States
- Products: Savings; checking; consumer loans; mortgages; credit cards
- Revenue: US$217M
- Website: altanafcu.org

Altana Federal Credit Union or (Altana FCU) (formerly Avanta Federal Credit Union and originally Laurel Federal Credit Union) is a federally insured, community chartered credit union in south-central Montana. The corporate office is in Billings, Montana.

== History ==
Altana Federal Credit Union (then Laurel Federal Credit Union) started in 1949 out of an empty railcar in Laurel, Montana. Several refinery workers joined and started the credit union as a way to safeguard themselves from the high cost of banking services. The first loan given was to purchase a sewing machine. Credit unions merged into Altana FCU include:

- Mountain States FCU – a credit union that served a Select Employer Group (SEG) that included employees of USWest and AT&T.
- Montana Media Credit Union – a credit union that served a Select Employer Group (SEG) that included people who worked in the media industry.
- Northwest Humble FCU – a credit union that served a Select Employer Group (SEG) that included employees of Exxon.
- Summit FCU – originally Yellowstone Teachers Credit Union, they served teachers, faculty and students for area schools before expanding to a community charter.
- BearPaw FCU - established in 1942 for Great Northern Railway employees — eventually expanding to their families, then to Havre as a whole, then to county and surrounding counties over the coming decades

== Membership ==
Persons who live, work, worship or attend school, and businesses located in the following Montana counties are eligible for membership at Altana Federal Credit Union: Big Horn, Blaine, Broadwater, Carbon, Carter, Cascade, Choteau, Custer, Daniels, Dawson, Fallon, Fergus, Gallatin, Garfield, Golden Valley, Hill, Judith Basin, Liberty, McCone, Meagher, Musselshell, Park, Petroleum, Phillips, Pondera, Powder River, Prairie, Richland, Roosevelt, Rosebud, Sheridan, Stillwater, Sweet Grass, Teton, Toole, Treasure, Valley, Wheatland, Wibaux, Yellowstone. Persons who live, work, worship or attend school, and businesses located in the following Wyoming counties are eligible for membership at Altana Federal Credit Union: Big Horn, Fremont, Hot Springs, Johnson, Park, Sheridan, Sublette, Teton, Washakie. As an added feature of membership, immediate family members are able to join. Immediate family members include a spouse, child, sibling, parent, grandparent, grandchild, stepparent, stepchild, step-sibling or adoptive relationship.

== Locations ==
Altana Federal Credit Union is located in the following towns in Montana: Billings, Columbus, Laurel, Red Lodge, Havre, Chinook, Shelby, Sunburst, and Chester.
