= Galata, Montana =

Galata
- Unincorporated community
- Location within Montana Location within the United States
- Coordinates: 48°28′32″N 111°21′08″W
- Country: United States
- State: Montana
- County: Toole
- Elevation: 3,101 ft (945 m)
- Time zone: UTC-7 (Mountain (MST))
  - Summer (DST): UTC-6 (MDT)
- ZIP code: 59444
- Area code: 406
- GNIS feature ID: 771676

Galata is an unincorporated community in Toole County, Montana, United States. The community has a post office with ZIP code 59444, which opened on July 12, 1902.

The town was named by the Great Northern Railway for nearby Galata Ravine.

== Transportation ==
Galata is located along the Hi-Line near U.S. Route 2, 23.2 miles (37.3 km) east of Shelby.

Amtrak’s Empire Builder, which operates between Seattle/Portland and Chicago, passes through the town, but makes no stop. The nearest station is located in Shelby.
