= List of power stations in Montana =

Sources of Montana utility-scale electricity generation in gigawatt-hours, full-year 2025:
1. Coal: 10,024 (35.2%)
2. Hydroelectric: 9,791 (34.4%)
3. Wind: 6,252 (21.9%)
4. Natural gas: 1,319 (4.63%)
5. Petroleum: 468 (1.64%)
6. Solar: 348 (1.22%)
7. Biomass: 38 (0.13%)
8. Other: 261 (0.92%)

This is a list of electricity-generating power stations in the U.S. state of Montana, sorted by type and name. In 2023, Montana had a total summer capacity of 7.2 GW through all of its power plants, and a net generation of 26,873 GWh. In 2025, the electrical energy generation mix was 35.2% coal, 34.4% hydroelectric, 21.9% wind, 4.6% natural gas, 1.6% petroleum, 1.2% solar, 0.1% biomass, and 0.9% other. Small-scale solar, including customer-owned photovoltaic panels, delivered and additional 148 GWh to the state's electrical grid in 2025.

During 2019, Montana exported about one-half of the electricity generated by its power plants to other states. Montana has the largest recoverable deposits of coal in the nation, accounting for 30% of U.S. reserves. In recent years three-quarters of the coal mined in Montana has been exported, with over one-third going to Asia via western Canada.

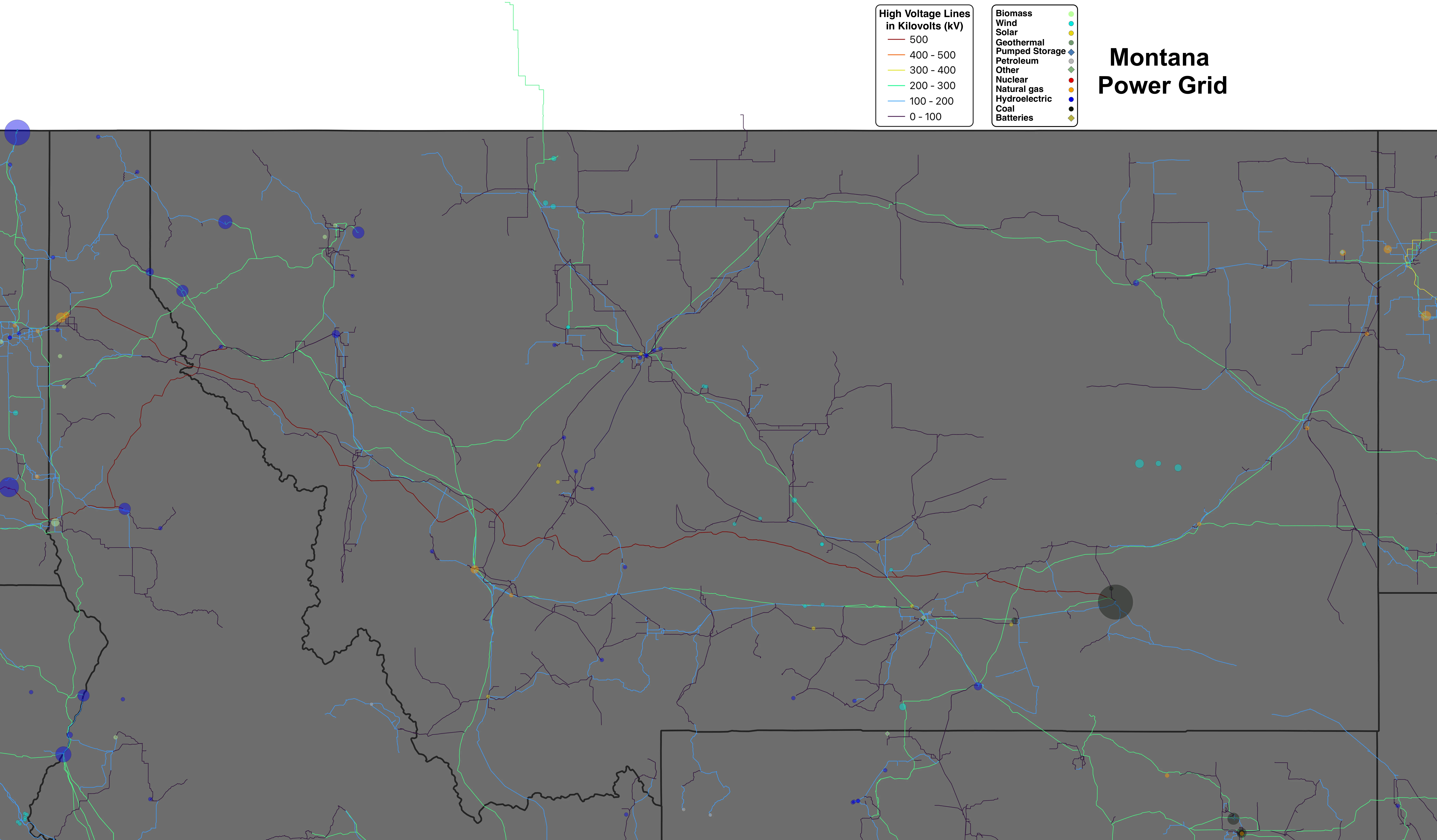
Montana power grid

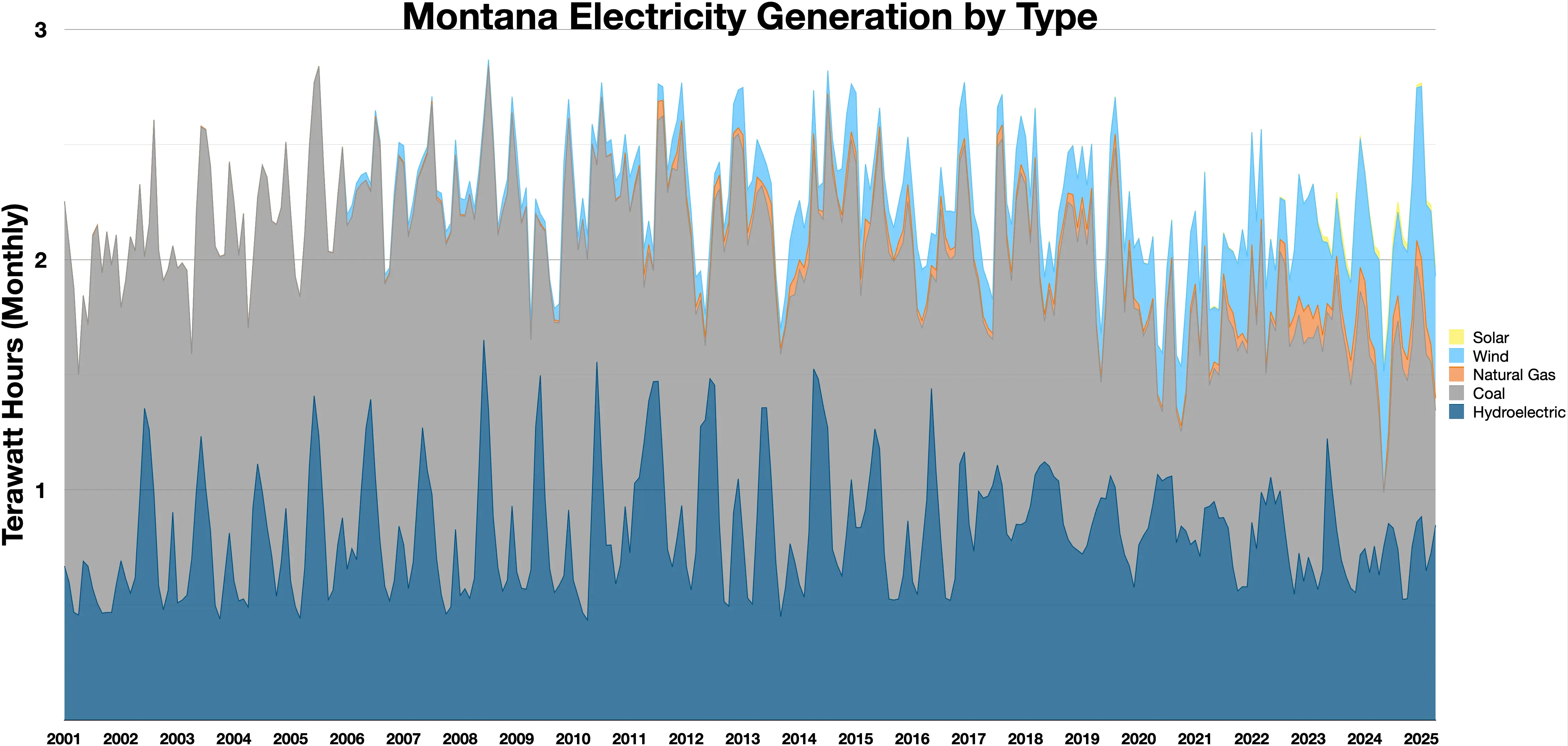
Montana electricity generation by type

== Nuclear power stations ==
Montana had no utility-scale plants that used fissile material as a fuel in 2022.

== Fossil-fuel power stations ==
Data from the U.S. Energy Information Administration serves as a general reference.

=== Coal ===
A useful map of coal generation plants is provided by the Sierra Club.

Name	Location	Coordinates	Capacity (MW)	Year opened	Scheduled Retirement	Refs
Colstrip Energy LP Plant	Rosebud County	45.9752°N 106.6547°W	38	1990	TBD	
Colstrip Steam Electric Station	Rosebud County	45.8831°N 106.614°W	1480	1975 (Unit 1- 340MW); 1976 (Unit 2- 340MW); 1984 (Unit 3- 740MW); 1986 (Unit 4- 740MW)	2020 (Unit 1- closed); 2020 (Unit 2- closed); 2027 (Unit 3); 2027 (Unit 4)	
Hardin Generator Project	Big Horn County	45.7578°N 107.6000°W	107	2006	TBD ^{[A]}	
Lewis & Clark Station	Richland County	47.6785°N 104.1566°W	53	1958	2021 (closed)	
Sidney Sugars Plant	Richland County	47.7172°N 104.1356°W	4.0	1950	TBD	

^{A} The Hardin facility was mostly idle and is re-ramping to service cryptocurrency mining.

=== Natural gas and petroleum ===
Name	Location	Coordinates	Capacity (MW)	Fuel type	Generation type	Year opened	Refs
Basin Creek Generation Plant	Silver Bow County	45.9293°N 112.5194°W	54	Gas	Reciprocating engine (x9)	2006	
Culbertson Generation Station	Roosevelt County	48.2100°N 104.3917°W	85	Gas	Simple cycle	2010	
Dave Gates Generating Station^{[A]}	Deer Lodge County	46.1047°N 112.8766°W	150	Gas	Simple cycle (x3)	2011	
Glendive Gas Turbine	Dawson County	47.0539°N 104.7400°W	75	Gas	Simple cycle (x2)	1979/2003	
Lewis & Clark 2	Richland County	47.6791°N 104.1600°W	19	Gas	Internal combustion (x2)	2015	
Miles City Gas Turbine	Custer County	46.4112°N 105.7953°W	24	Gas	Simple cycle	1972	
OREG 1 & 2	Roosevelt County	48.2141°N 104.3975°W	40	Waste heat from gas compressor turbine	ORC generator (x8)	2006/2009	
Phillips 66 Billings Refinery	Yellowstone County	45.7769°N 108.4911°W	1.5	Petroleum gases	Steam turbine	2007	
Yellowstone Energy	Yellowstone County	45.8117°N 108.4278°W	52	Petroleum	Steam turbine	1995	

^{A} Formerly Mill Creek Generating Station

== Renewable power stations ==
Data from the U.S. Energy Information Administration serves as a general reference.

=== Biomass ===
Name	Location	Coordinates	Capacity (MW)	Fuel	Generation type	Year opened	Refs
Stoltze CoGen1	Flathead County	48.3877°N 114.2409°W	3.0	Wood/wood waste	Steam turbine	2013	

=== Hydroelectric ===
Additional Montana hydroelectric general references:

Name	Location	Coordinates	Capacity (MW)	Number of turbines	Year opened	Refs
Bigfork Hydro	Flathead		4.5	3	1908	
Black Eagle Hydro	Cascade County	47.5213°N 111.2614°W	21	3	1927	
Broadwater Power Project	Broadwater County	46.1206°N 111.4076°W	9.7	1	1989	
Canyon Ferry Powerplant	Lewis and Clark County	46.6490°N 111.7279°W	57.6	3	1953-1954	
Cochrane Hydro	Cascade County	47.5375°N 111.1950°W	62	2	1958	
Flint Creek Hydro	Granite County	46.2275°N 113.2947°W	2.0	1	2013	
Fort Peck Hydropower Plant	McCone County	48.0122°N 106.4123°W	218	5	1943/1948/ 1951/1961	
Hauser Hydro	Lewis and Clark County	46.7659°N 111.8873°W	18.2	6	1911	
Holter Hydro	Cascade County	46.9915°N 112.0047°W	53.2	4	1918	
Hungry Horse Powerplant	Flathead County	48.3415°N 114.0144°W	427	4	1952-1953	
Libby Hydro Plant	Lincoln County	48.4098°N 115.3143°W	525	5	1975-1976/ 1984	
Madison Hydro	Madison County	45.4879°N 111.6338°W	8.0	4	1906/1908	
Morony Hydro	Cascade County	47.5817°N 111.0609°W	49	2	1930	
Mystic Lake Hydro	Stillwater County	45.2257°N 109.7625°W	12	2	1925	
Noxon Rapids Hydro	Sanders County	47.9605°N 115.7336°W	580	5	1959-1960/ 1977	
Rainbow Hydro	Cascade County	47.5344°N 111.2045°W	64	1	2013	
Ryan Hydro	Cascade County	47.5699°N 111.1225°W	69.5	6	1915-1916	
Seli's Ksanka Qlispe' Hydro (formerly Kerr Dam Hydro)	Lake County	47.6777°N 114.2339°W	206	3	1938/1949/ 1954	
South Dry Creek Hydro	Carbon County	45.2063°N 109.1652°W	2.0	1	1985	
Thompson Falls Hydro	Sanders County	47.5932°N 115.3582°W	94	7	1915-1917	
Tiber Dam Hydro	Liberty County	48.318°N 111.1018°W	7.5	1	2004	
Turnbull Hydro	Teton County	47.6053°N 112.0969°W	13	2	2011	
Yellowtail Powerplant	Big Horn County	45.3074°N 107.9575°W	278	4	1966	

=== Wind ===
Name	Location	Coordinates	Capacity (MW)	Number of turbines	Year opened	Turbine mfg spec	Refs
Big Timber Wind Farm (Greycliff)	Sweet Grass County	45.8554°N 109.6492°W	25	14	2018	GE 1.8MW	
Diamond Willow Wind Facility	Fallon County	46.2753°N 104.1836°W	30	20	2008	GE 1.5MW	
Fairfield Wind	Teton County	47.7233°N 111.9653°W	10	6	2014	GE 1.6/1.7MW	
Glacier Wind I&II	Glacier County; Toole County	48.5333°N 112.1847°W	210	140	2008	Acciona 1.5MW	
Gordon Butte Wind	Meagher County	46.4119°N 110.3378°W	17.7	9	2012; 2018	GE 1.6MW; GE 2.7MW	
Greenfield Wind	Teton County	47.7230°N 111.9630°W	25	13	2016	GE 2.3MW	
Horseshoe Bend Wind Park	Cascade County	47.4983°N 111.4392°W	9.0	6	2006	GE 1.5MW	
Judith Gap Wind Energy Center	Wheatland County	46.5725°N 109.7531°W	135	90	2006	GE 1.5MW	
Musselshell Wind Project I&II	Wheatland County	46.2753°N 109.4827°W	20	14	2013	GE 1.5MW	
Pryor Mountain Wind Project^{[A]}	Carbon County	45°08′05″N 108°41′12″W	240	114	2020	Vestas 2.0/2.2MW; GE 2.3MW	
Rim Rock Wind Farm	Glacier County; Toole County	48.8202°N 112.1033°W	189	126	2012	Acciona 1.5MW	
South Peak Wind	Judith Basin County	47.3299°N 110.6146°W	80	29	2020	GE 2.3/2.5MW	
Spion Kop Wind Farm	Judith Basin County	47.3333°N 110.6392°W	40	25	2013	GE 1.6MW	
Stillwater Wind	Stillwater County	45.8658°N 109.4766°W	80	31	2018	Siemens-Gamesa 2.3/2.6MW	
Two Dot Wind Farm	Wheatland County	46.4494°N 110.0872°W	9.7	6	2014	GE 1.6MW	

^{A} Formerly Mud Springs Wind

=== Solar ===
Project name	Location	Coordinates	Capacity (MW_{AC})	Year opened	Refs
Black Eagle Solar	Cascade County	47.5475°N 111.2540°W	3.0	2017	
Great Divide Solar	Lewis and Clark County	46.8057°N 112.2490°W	3.0	2017	
Green Meadow Solar	Lewis and Clark County	46.6945°N 112.0636°W	3.0	2017	
Magpie Solar	Golden Valley County	46.2914°N 108.9379°W	3.0	2017	
River Bend Solar	Stillwater County	45.7038°N 109.5652°W	2.0	2017	
South Mills Solar	Big Horn County	45.7301°N 107.6326°W	3.0	2017	

== Storage power stations ==
Montana had no utility-scale storage power stations in 2019. A proposed facility is the 400MW/1300MWh Gordon Butte Pumped Storage Project.
