= Kevin, Montana =

- Town
- Location of Kevin, Montana
- Coordinates: 48°44′54″N 111°57′54″W
- Country: United States
- State: Montana
- County: Toole

Area
  - Total: 0.39 sq mi (1.00 km^{2})
  - Land: 0.36 sq mi (0.94 km^{2})
  - Water: 0.027 sq mi (0.07 km^{2})
- Elevation: 3,330 ft (1,010 m)

Population (2020)
  - Total: 154
  - Density: 426.1/sq mi (164.51/km^{2})
- Time zone: UTC-7 (Mountain (MST))
  - Summer (DST): UTC-6 (MDT)
- ZIP code: 59454
- Area code: 406
- FIPS code: 30-40525
- GNIS feature ID: 2412830

Kevin is a town in Toole County, Montana, United States. The population was 154 at the 2020 census, equal to the 2010 Census population. Kevin is pronounced with a long E, like Keevin.

The town was named after Thomas Kevin, superintendent of the Alberta Railway & Irrigation Company.

== History ==
The Kevin Depot was built by the Great Northern Railway in 1903. The town was founded in 1910 with a post office established the same year. Oil was discovered in the Kevin Sunburst Oil Field in 1922. The Montana West Oil Company established a refinery in the 1920s which was closed in 1977.

== Geography ==
Interstate 15 passes near the community, with access from Exit 379. Goedertz Lake is nearby.

According to the United States Census Bureau, the town has a total area of 0.36 square miles (0.93 km^{2}), of which 0.34 square miles (0.88 km^{2}) is land and 0.02 square miles (0.05 km^{2}) is water.

== Demographics ==
Historical population
Census	Pop.	Note	%±
1930	324		—
1940	360		11.1%
1960	375		—
1970	250		−33.3%
1980	208		−16.8%
1990	185		−11.1%
2000	178		−3.8%
2010	154		−13.5%
2020	154		0.0%
U.S. Decennial Census

=== 2010 census ===
As of the census of 2010, there were 154 people, 71 households, and 41 families residing in the town. The population density was 452.9 inhabitants per square mile (174.9/km^{2}). There were 90 housing units at an average density of 264.7 per square mile (102.2/km^{2}). The racial makeup of the town was 98.7% White, 0.6% African American, and 0.6% Native American. Hispanic or Latino of any race were 0.6% of the population.

There were 71 households, of which 25.4% had children under the age of 18 living with them, 45.1% were married couples living together, 4.2% had a female householder with no husband present, 8.5% had a male householder with no wife present, and 42.3% were non-families. 39.4% of all households were made up of individuals, and 14.1% had someone living alone who was 65 years of age or older. The average household size was 2.17 and the average family size was 2.90.

The median age in the town was 42 years. 26.6% of residents were under the age of 18; 5.1% were between the ages of 18 and 24; 20.8% were from 25 to 44; 32.4% were from 45 to 64; and 14.9% were 65 years of age or older. The gender makeup of the town was 53.2% male and 46.8% female.

=== 2000 census ===
As of the census of 2000, there were 178 people, 72 households, and 47 families residing in the town. The population density was 511.8 inhabitants per square mile (197.6/km^{2}). There were 91 housing units at an average density of 261.7 per square mile (101.0/km^{2}). The racial makeup of the town was 88.76% White, 5.62% Native American, 1.12% Asian, 0.56% Pacific Islander, 3.37% from other races, and 0.56% from two or more races. Hispanic or Latino of any race were 5.62% of the population.

There were 72 households, out of which 37.5% had children under the age of 18 living with them, 50.0% were married couples living together, 4.2% had a female householder with no husband present, and 34.7% were non-families. 29.2% of all households were made up of individuals, and 19.4% had someone living alone who was 65 years of age or older. The average household size was 2.47 and the average family size was 3.00.

In the town, the population was spread out, with 28.1% under the age of 18, 6.7% from 18 to 24, 28.7% from 25 to 44, 20.8% from 45 to 64, and 15.7% who were 65 years of age or older. The median age was 39 years. For every 100 females there were 97.8 males. For every 100 females age 18 and over, there were 106.5 males.

The median income for a household in the town was $20,417, and the median income for a family was $29,167. Males had a median income of $30,625 versus $18,750 for females. The per capita income for the town was $14,003. About 20.5% of families and 19.9% of the population were below the poverty line, including 35.7% of those under the age of eighteen and 21.2% of those 65 or over.

== Government ==
The town has a mayor and four council members. Bob Fagan was elected mayor in November 2025.

== Education ==
Students attend kindergarten to grade 12 in Sunburst. High school is at North Toole County High School. There is also a Junior High and an Elementary school. The entire district had 123 students in the 2024–2025 school year.
