= Glacier Wind Farm =

Wind farm in Montana, USA

- Official name: Glacier Wind Farm
- Country: United States
- Location: Glacier and Toole County near Ethridge, Montana
- Coordinates: 48°30′28″N 112°05′27″W
- Status: Operational
- Construction began: July 2007
- Commission date: Oct 2008 (phase I), Oct 2009 (phase II)
- Construction cost: $500 million
- Owner: NaturEner
- Operator: NaturEner

Wind farm
- Type: Onshore

Power generation
- Units operational: 140 turbines
- Make and model: Acciona AW77 1.5 MW
- Nameplate capacity: 210 MW
- Capacity factor: 29.5% (average 2010-2019)
- Annual net output: 542 GW·h

The Glacier Wind Farm spans southwest Glacier County and southeast Toole County in northern Montana. With a total generating capacity of 210 megawatts (MW), it became the largest wind farm in the state when the second construction phase came online at the end of 2009. A portion of the electricity is purchased by San Diego Gas and Electric.

== Facility details ==
The facility is located off of U.S. Highway 2 south of the unincorporated community of Ethridge, between the cities of Cut Bank and Shelby, and spans about 25,000 acres. It was constructed in two phases by Mortenson Construction, starting with a groundbreaking celebration in July 2007. The completed facility consists of 140 wind turbines and their foundations, electrical substations, maintenance buildings, access roads, underground collection lines, and overhead transmission lines.

Phase I entered service in October 2008 and uses 71 Acciona 1.7 MW turbines. Phase II came online in October 2009 and uses an additional 69 Acciona 1.7 MW turbines. The 189 MW Rim Rock Wind Farm was subsequently completed about 15 miles to the north in 2012. In addition to the hundreds of construction jobs and millions of dollars in cumulative land lease payments and tax revenues, about 10-15 permanent local jobs were also created to maintain the facilities over their lifetime.

== Electricity production ==
Glacier Wind Farm Electricity Generation (MW·h)
Year	Glacier I (106.5 MW)	Glacier II (103.5 MW)	Total Annual MW·h
2009	249,079	43,184*	292,263
2010	211,679	215,595	427,274
2011	308,543	321,846	630,389
2012	290,267	286,948	577,215
2013	284,762	276,187	560,949
2014	272,897	259,192	532,089
2015	260,622	258,022	518,644
2016	284,566	290,305	574,871
2017	287,367	286,219	573,586
2018	260,131	248,208	508,339
2019	254,813	264,259	519,072
Average Annual Production (years 2010–2019) →			542,243
Average Capacity Factor (years 2010–2019) --->			29.5%

(*) partial year of operation

== See also ==
- Wind power in Montana
- List of wind farms in the United States
