= Billings station =

Billings, MT
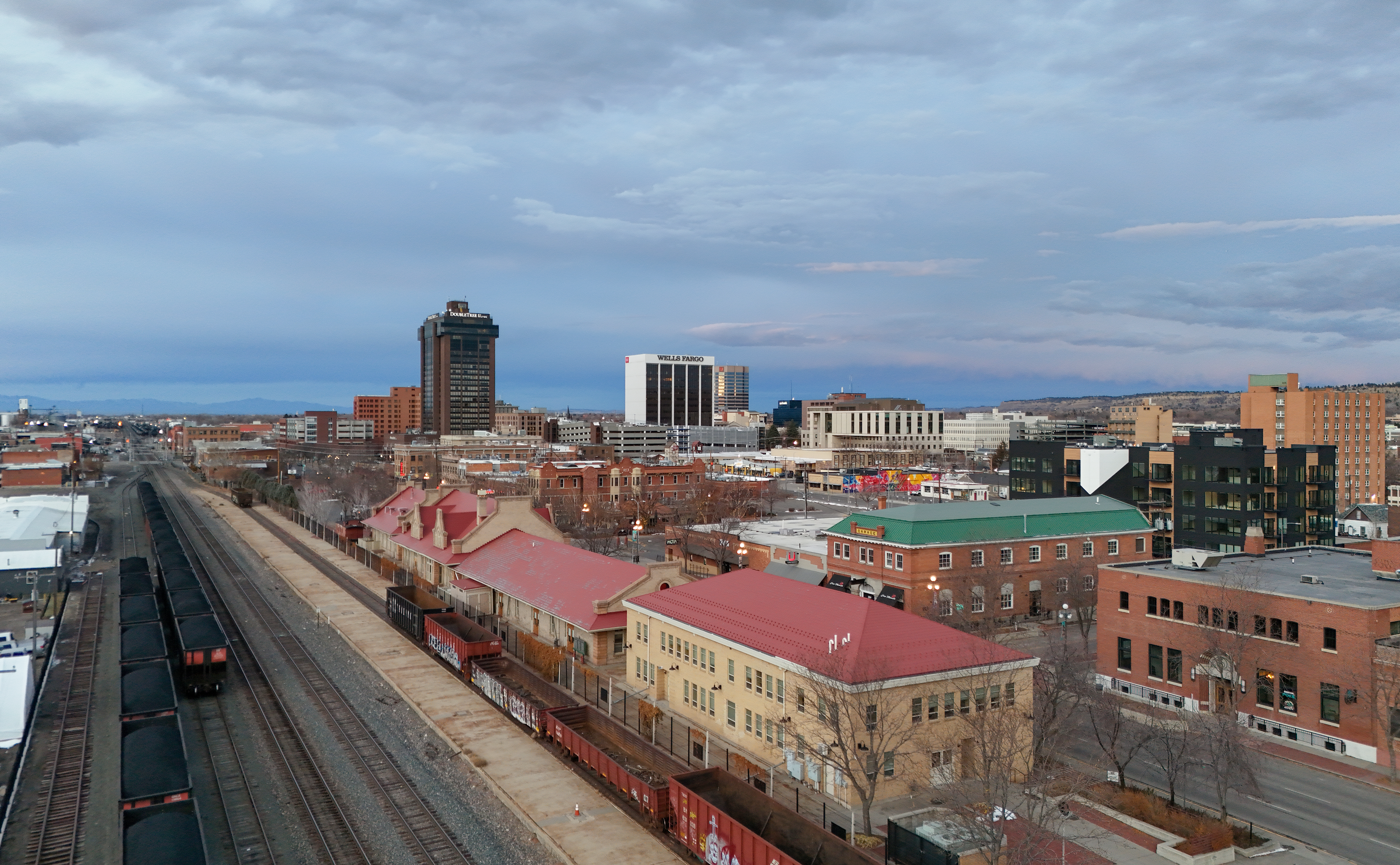
- Billings Depot on December 7, 2024.

General information
- Location: 2320 Montana Avenue; Billings, Montana; USA
- System: inter-city rail station

History
- Opened: 1909
- Closed: 1979

Former services
Preceding station	Amtrak	Following station
Livingston toward Seattle	North Coast Hiawatha	Forsyth toward Chicago
Preceding station	Burlington Route	Following station
Terminus	Billings – Kansas City	Huntley toward Kansas City
Terminus	Billings – Wendover	Laurel toward Wendover
Preceding station	Great Northern Railway	Following station
Mossmain toward Shelby	Shelby – Billings	Terminus
Preceding station	Northern Pacific Railway	Following station
Mossmain toward Seattle or Tacoma	Main Line	Custer toward St. Paul
- Northern Pacific Depot
- U.S. Historic district – Contributing property
- Location: Roughly bounded by N. 23rd and N. 25th Sts., 1st and Montana Aves., Billings, Montana
- Coordinates: 45.7837°N 108.4993°W
- Built: 1882
- Built by: Northern Pacific Railway
- Architectural style: Beaux Arts
- Part of: Billings Historic District (ID79001427)
- Added to NRHP: March 13, 1979
Location

Billings station is a historic train depot in the Historic District of downtown Billings, Montana, United States. The depot was constructed to serve as a passenger station for the Northern Pacific Railway, Great Northern and Chicago, Burlington and Quincy. All three railroad merged to form the Burlington Northern Railroad in 1970, along with the Spokane, Portland and Seattle Railway. In 1971 Amtrak took over passenger service throughout the country.

The station has been a contributing property on the Billings Historic District since 1978, listed as the Northern Pacific Depot. The last regular Amtrak train, the North Coast Hiawatha, departed in October 1979.

Today, the depot has been renovated into a popular events center.
