= Bethany Lutheran Church =

Bethany Lutheran Church may refer to:

- Bethany Lutheran Church (Iron River, Michigan), listed on the National Register of Historic Places in Iron County, Michigan
- Bethany Lutheran Church (Oilmont, Montana), listed on the National Register of Historic Places in Toole County, Montana
- Bethany Lutheran Church, Ephraim, listed on the National Register of Historic Places in Door County, Wisconsin
