= Ethridge, Montana =

- Unincorporated community
- Location within Montana Location within the United States
- Coordinates: 48°33′28″N 112°07′14″W
- Country: United States
- State: Montana
- County: Toole
- Elevation: 3,543 ft (1,080 m)
- Time zone: UTC-7 (Mountain (MST))
  - Summer (DST): UTC-6 (MDT)
- ZIP code: 59435
- Area code: 406
- GNIS feature ID: 771247

Ethridge is an unincorporated community in Toole County, Montana, United States. It is located 12.6 miles (20.3 km) west-northwest of Shelby. It is located on U.S. Route 2, and is a grain storage and shipping point on the Hi-Line. The community has a post office with ZIP code 59435.

Glacier Wind Farm is located south of Ethridge off U.S. Route 2, between the cities of Cut Bank and Shelby, and spans about 25,000 acres.

Sometime in early 1900, the Great Northern Railway station named Galt was renamed Ethridge.
