= Bethany Lutheran Church (Oilmont, Montana) =

Historic church in Montana, United States

- U.S. National Register of Historic Places
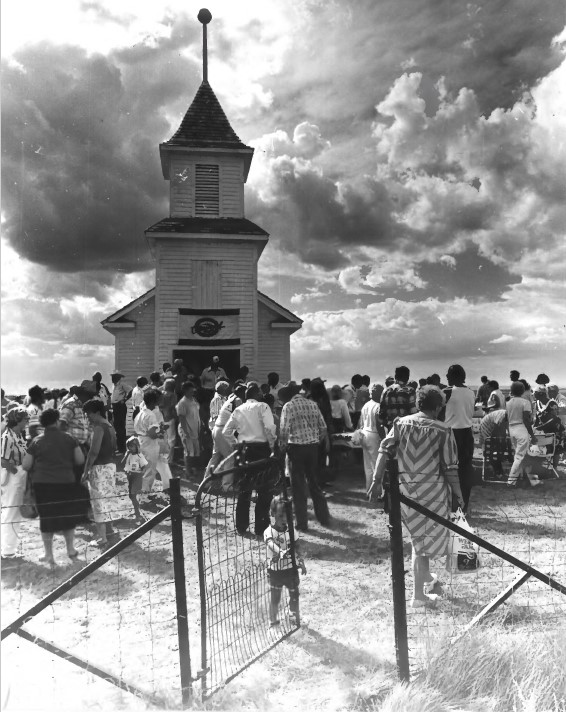

- Location within Montana Location within the United States
- Location: .25 miles south of Gus Blaze Rd.
- Coordinates: 48°41′37″N 111°38′41″W
- NRHP reference No.: 93001375
- Added to NRHP: December 14, 1993

The Bethany Lutheran Church is a historic wood-frame church building located in Oilmont, Montana. It was added to the National Register of Historic Places on December 14, 1993.

== History ==
After the Great Northern Railway built a line through the area, Scandinavian immigrants began to settle in Toole County. The immigrants brought their religion with them, and starting in 1885 the Lutheran Church developed a presence in the county. The influx of immigrants reached its peak in the 1910s; it was in this decade, in 1911, that Norwegian settlers formed the congregation which became Bethany Lutheran Church. The congregation initially met in members' houses and the local school, but in 1916 it acquired land to build a church on. Economic difficulties stalled construction plans until 1923, when the congregation's Ladies Aid group bought a church building to place on the site. The church building was moved to the church's land the next year, and final construction was completed in 1925. The church remained active until 1960, when its congregation merged with St. Luke's Parish in Shelby.

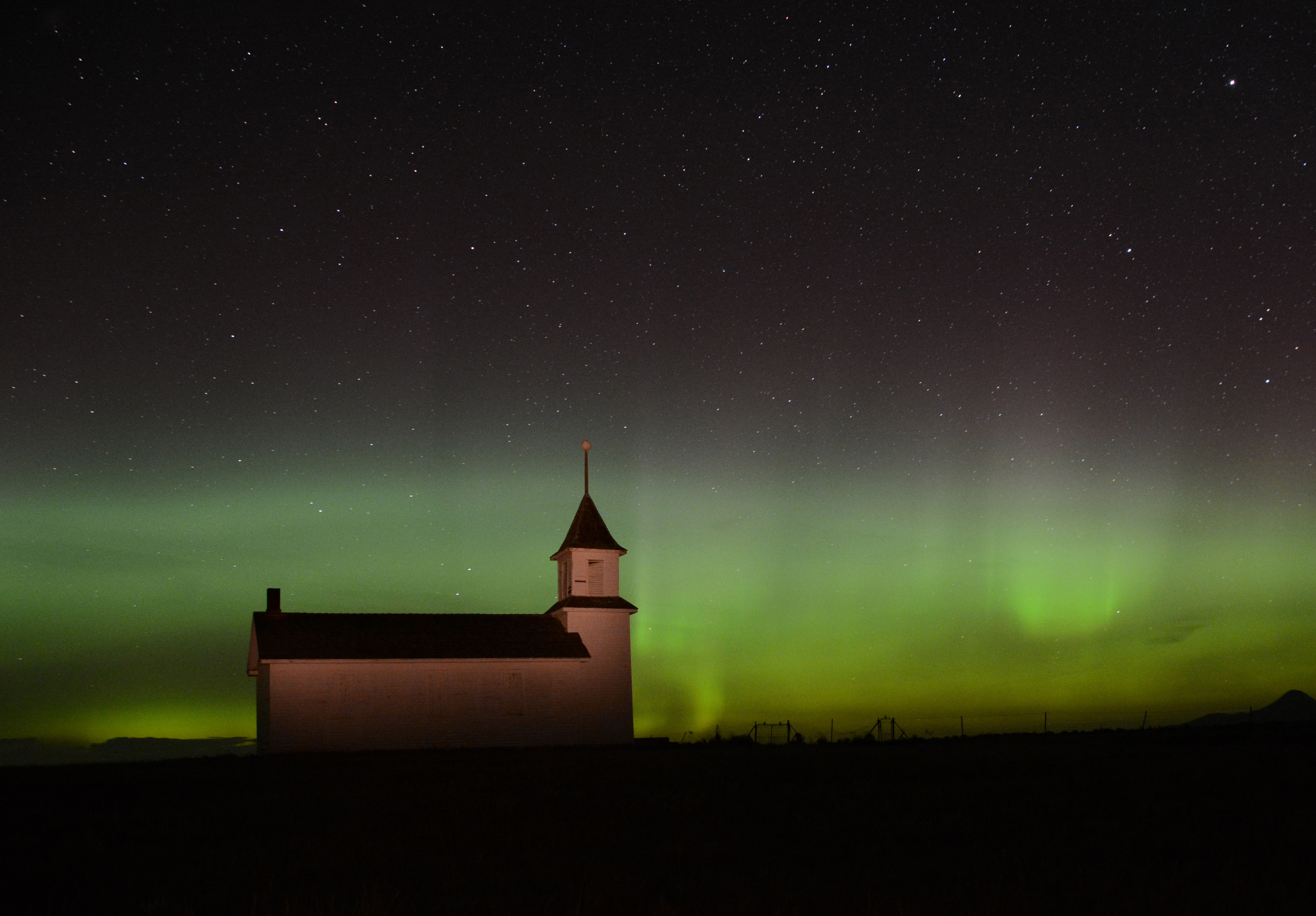
Church in 2016 during a Northern Lights display
