= Camrose Colony, Montana =

- Census-designated place
- Location within Montana Location within the United States
- Coordinates: 48°18′42″N 111°36′43″W
- Country: United States
- State: Montana
- County: Toole

Area
  - Total: 0.37 sq mi (0.97 km^{2})
  - Land: 0.37 sq mi (0.97 km^{2})
  - Water: 0 sq mi (0.00 km^{2})
- Elevation: 3,484 ft (1,062 m)

Population (2020)
  - Total: 184
  - Density: 492.7/sq mi (190.22/km^{2})
- Time zone: UTC-7 (Mountain (MST))
  - Summer (DST): UTC-6 (MDT)
- ZIP Code: 59456 (Ledger)
- Area code: 406
- FIPS code: 30-11999
- GNIS feature ID: 2806674

Camrose Colony is a Hutterite community and census-designated place (CDP) in Toole County, Montana, United States. As of the 2020 census, Camrose Colony had a population of 184.

It is in the southern part of the county, 21 miles (34 km) southeast of Shelby, the Toole county seat, and 24 miles (39 km) northeast of Conrad.

Camrose Colony was first listed as a CDP prior to the 2020 census.

== Demographics ==
Historical population
Census	Pop.	Note	%±
2020	184		—
U.S. Decennial Census
