= Wind power in Montana =

Electricity from wind in one U.S. state

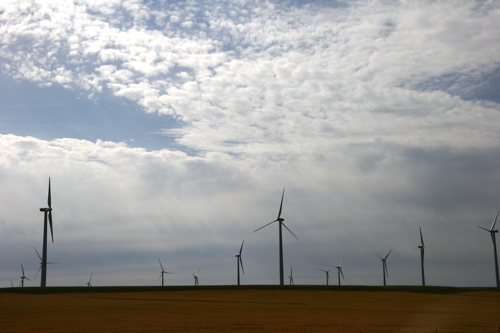
Judith Gap

Wind power in Montana is a growing industry. Montana had over 695 MW of wind generation capability by 2016, responsible for 7.6% of in-state electricity generation.

== History ==
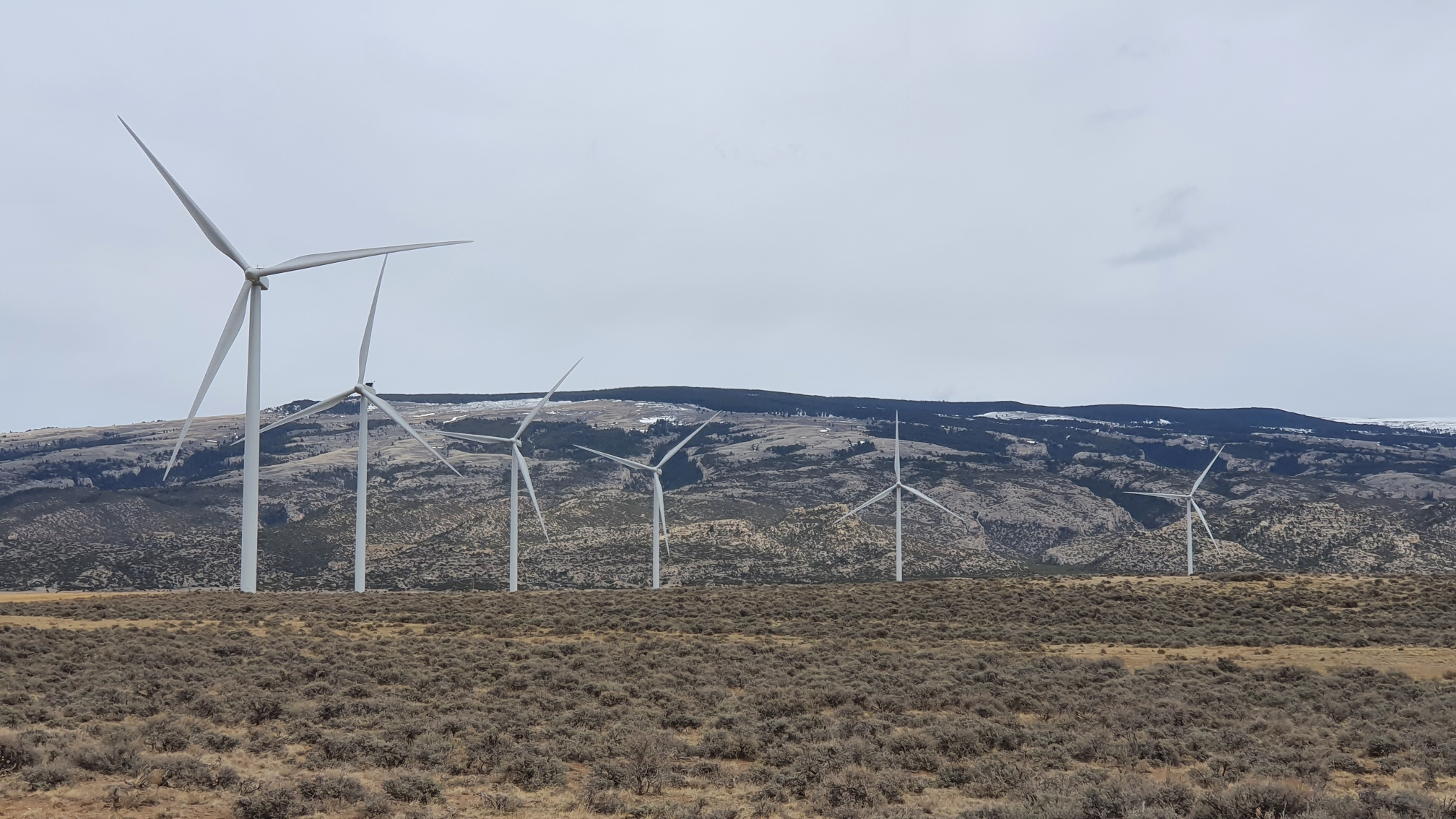
Pryor Mountain Wind Farm

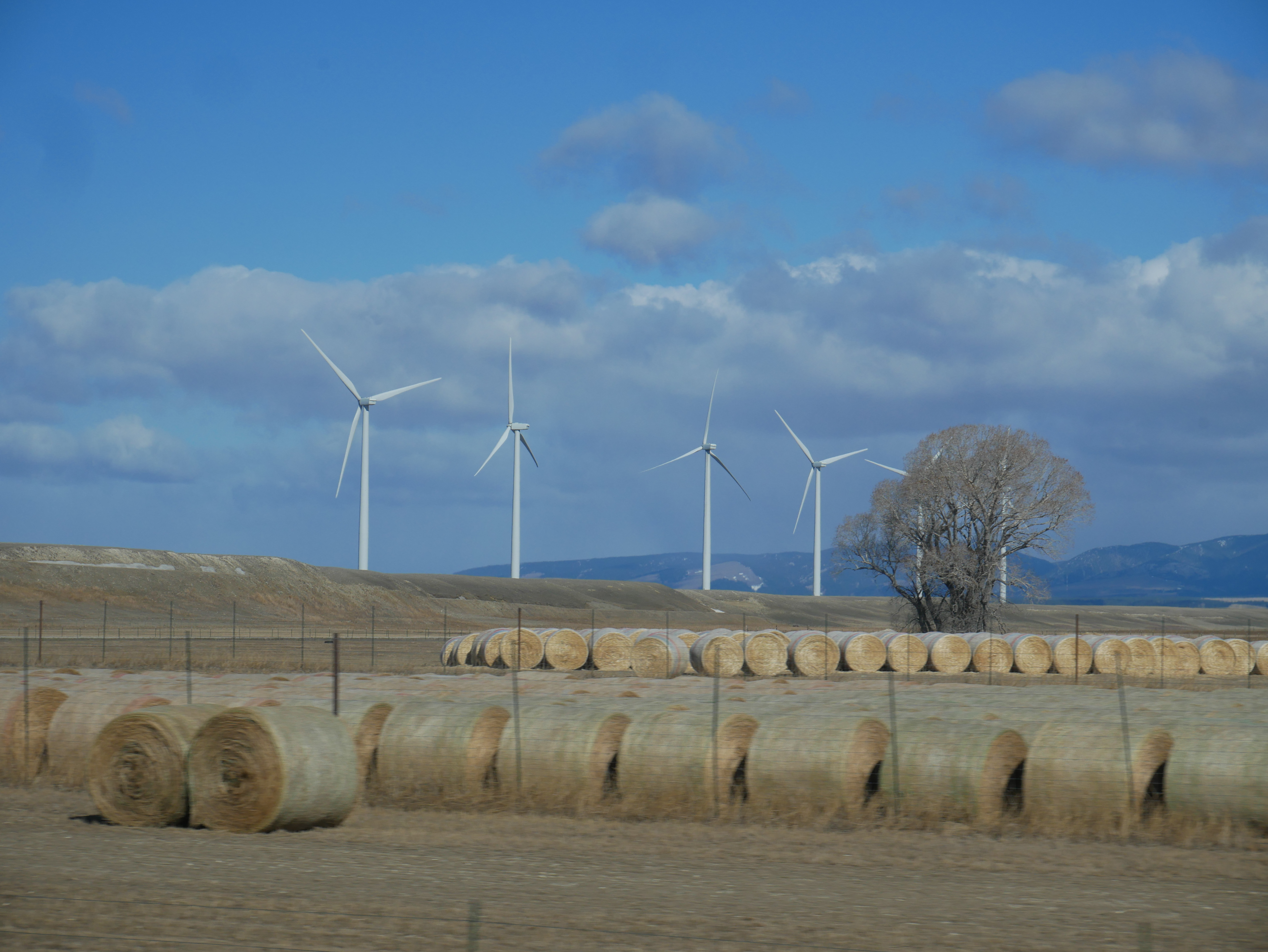
Two Dot Wind Farm

At a nameplate capacity of 210 megawatts (MW), the $500 million Glacier Wind Farm, which is located in Toole and Glacier counties, became Montana's largest in October 2009, surpassing the 135 MW Judith Gap Wind Farm in Wheatland County.

Rim Rock Wind Farm, brought online in September 2012, is located about 25 miles due north of the Glacier project. It has 126 wind turbines of 1.5 megawatts each, to be supplied by Acciona. The project had been delayed due to issues with the Montana-Alberta Tie Line, which connects wind farms in the area to Lethbridge, Alberta.

Montana added two significant wind projects in 2012. The Gordon Butte Wind Farm, 9 MW, was completed early in the year, and the Rim Rock Wind Project, 189 MW, was completed in September.

== Installed capacity growth ==
Montana wind generation capacity by year	Montana wind generation by year
Megawatts of wind capacity	Thousand megawatt-hours of wind generation

== Wind farms ==
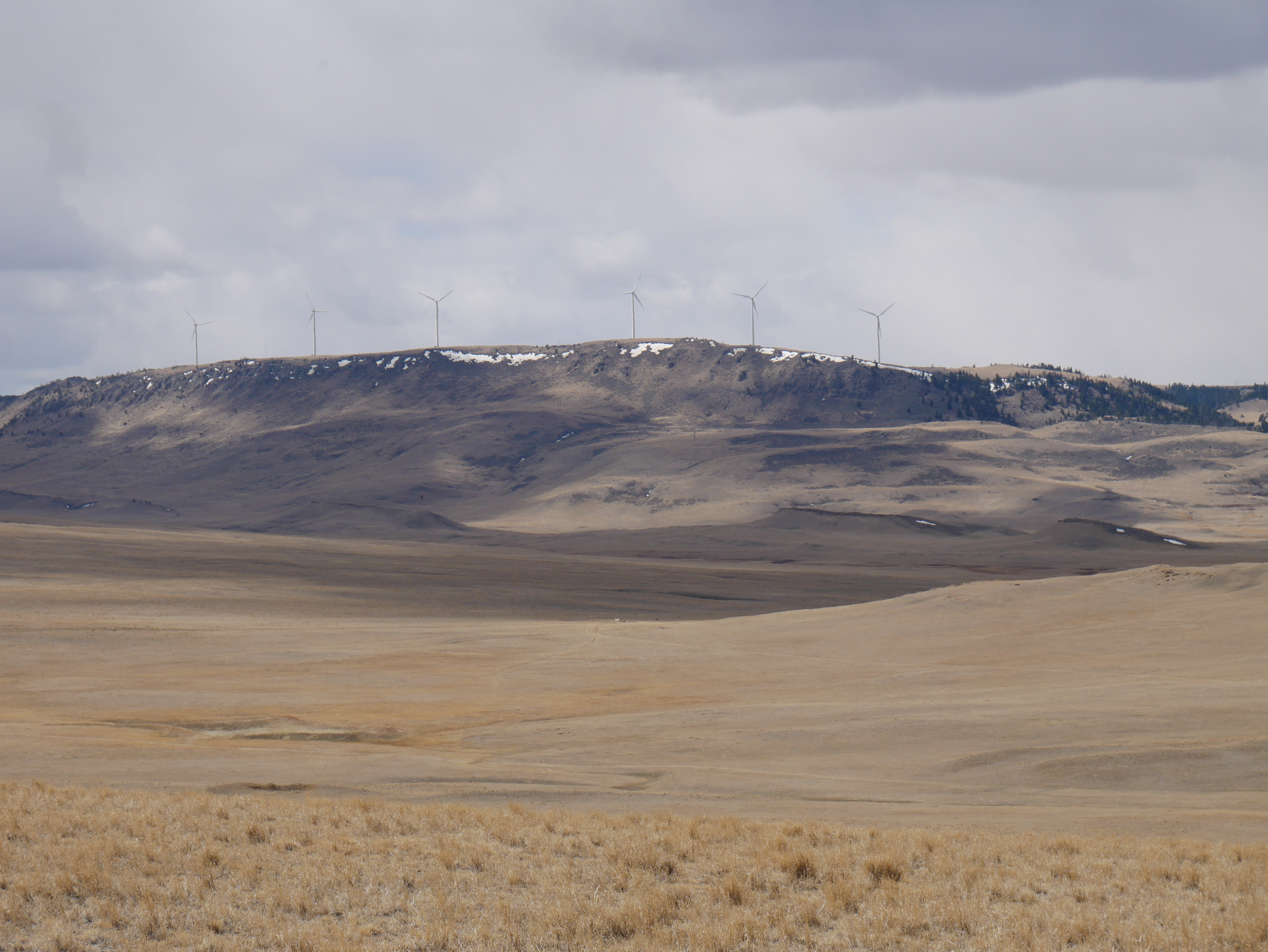
Gordon Butte Wind Farm

Glacier Wind Farm became Montana's largest wind farm. Its first 106.5 MW stage was completed in late 2008, and it nearly doubled in size to a 210 MW capacity when the second stage was completed in 2009. Numerous smaller farms were constructed during the following decade. Glacier was surpassed by the 240 MW Pryor Mountain Wind Project upon its completion in late 2020.

== Wind generation ==
Montana wind generation (GWh, million kWh)
Year	Total	Jan	Feb	Mar	Apr	May	Jun	Jul	Aug	Sep	Oct	Nov	Dec
2006	434	47	48	32	38	34	29	25	24	34	21	46	56
2007	496	72	44	53	36	35	24	19	28	35	47	37	66
2008	594	69	67	56	46	45	37	29	36	27	52	62	68
2009	819	107	58	81	77	64	40	36	20	49	75	130	82
2010	930	81	55	92	104	85	69	62	60	60	81	101	80
2011	1,263	150	108	84	112	102	84	76	59	73	113	138	164
2012	1,263	163	87	130	94	98	110	57	58	54	121	127	164
2013	1,755	206	189	140	164	132	110	88	57	85	127	197	259
2014	1,973	259	172	174	188	98	126	100	101	108	202	237	208
2015	2,174	258	167	238	147	101	82	132	117	141	166	209	207
2016	2,139	197	263	223	162	140	150	125	113	168	150	205	243
2017	2,155	200	195	206	204	195	147	122	132	137	208	198	211
2018	2,153	178	169	214	216	161	179	141	148	149	177	211	210
2019	2,373	221	192	191	212	189	177	171	161	209	219	211	220
2020	2,992	273	286	234	265	215	233	164	161	220	257	371	313
2021	2,823	286	212	275	236	197	193	138	186	222	241	350	287
2022	4,035	472	411	390	345	317	234	185	188	210	289	526	468
2023	1,399	457	573	369									

Teal background indicates the largest wind generation month for the year.

Green background indicates the largest wind generation month to date.

== See also ==
- Solar power in Montana
- Wind power in the United States
- Renewable energy in the United States
