= Shelby Airport =

Airport in Montana, United States

- IATA: SBX; ICAO: KSBX; FAA LID: SBX

Summary
- Airport type: Public
- Owner: Toole County
- Serves: Shelby, Montana
- Elevation AMSL: 3,443 ft (1,049 m)
- Coordinates: 48°32′26″N 111°52′16″W
- Interactive map of Shelby Airport

Runways
Direction	Length		Surface
Direction	ft	m	Surface
5/23	5,005	1,526	Asphalt
11/29	3,701	1,128	Asphalt

Statistics (2011)
- Aircraft operations: 8,500
- Based aircraft: 16
- Source: Federal Aviation Administration

Shelby Airport (IATA: SBX, ICAO: KSBX, FAA LID: SBX) is a county-owned airport two miles north of Shelby, in Toole County, Montana. The National Plan of Integrated Airport Systems for 2011–2015 called it a general aviation airport.

== Facilities ==
Shelby Airport covers 634 acres (257 ha) at an elevation of 3,443 feet (1,049 m). It has two asphalt runways: 5/23 is 5,005 by 75 feet (1,526 x 23 m) and 11/29 is 3,701 by 60 feet (1,128 x 18 m).

In the year ending September 9, 2011 the airport had 8,500 aircraft operations, average 23 per day: 95% general aviation, 3% military, and 2% air taxi. 16 aircraft were then based at this airport: 87.5% single-engine and 12.5% multi-engine.

== See also ==
- List of airports in Montana
