= Rimrock Colony, Montana =

- Census-designated place
- Location within Montana Location within the United States
- Coordinates: 48°53′43″N 112°05′43″W
- Country: United States
- State: Montana
- County: Toole

Area
  - Total: 0.31 sq mi (0.81 km^{2})
  - Land: 0.31 sq mi (0.81 km^{2})
  - Water: 0 sq mi (0.00 km^{2})
- Elevation: 3,983 ft (1,214 m)

Population (2020)
  - Total: 105
  - Density: 334.8/sq mi (129.27/km^{2})
- Time zone: UTC-7 (Mountain (MST))
  - Summer (DST): UTC-6 (MDT)
- ZIP Code: 59482 (Sunburst)
- Area code: 406
- FIPS code: 30-62825
- GNIS feature ID: 2806677

Rimrock Colony is a Hutterite community and census-designated place (CDP) in Toole County, Montana, United States. It is in the northwestern part of the county, 10 miles (16 km) west of Sunburst and 13 miles (21 km) south of Sweet Grass. As of the 2020 census, Rimrock Colony had a population of 105.

Rimrock Colony was first listed as a CDP prior to the 2020 census.

== Demographics ==
Historical population
| Census | Pop. | Note | %± |
|---|---|---|---|
| 2020 | 105 | | — |
U.S. Decennial Census
