= Kevin station =

- Kevin Depot
- U.S. National Register of Historic Places
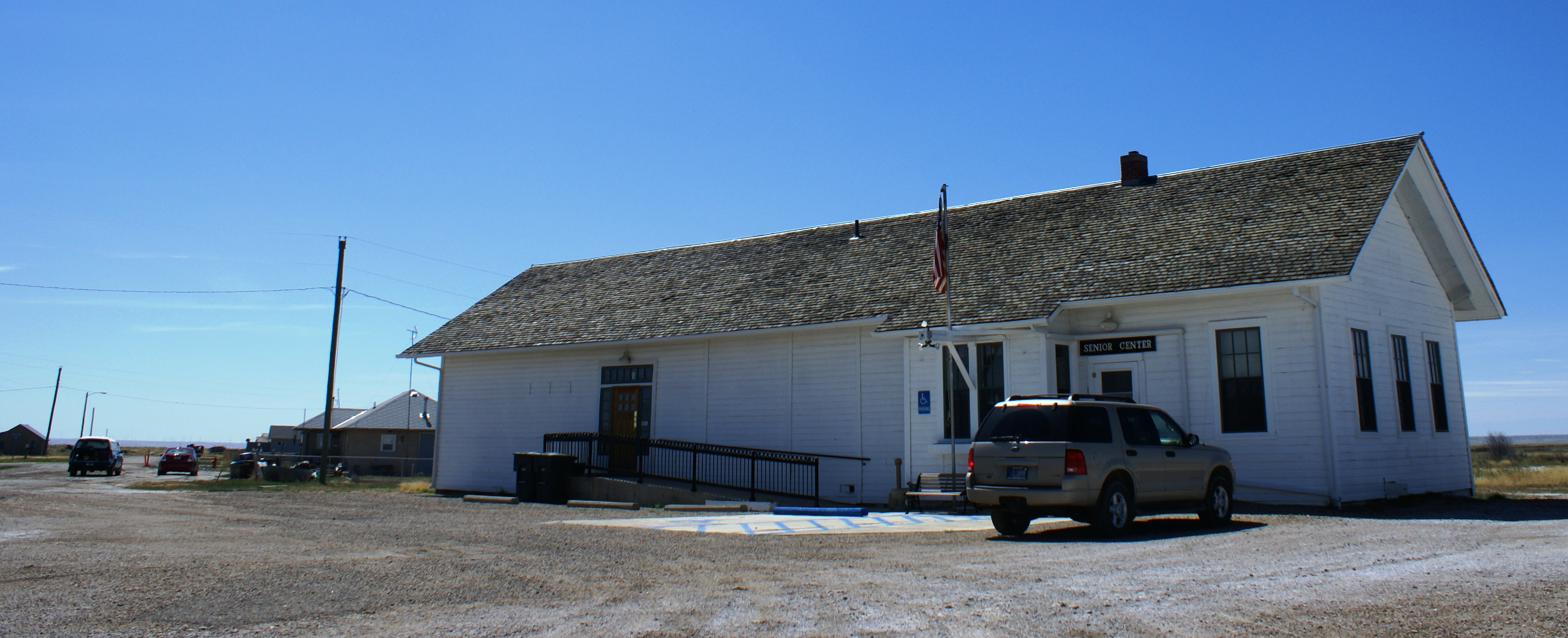

- Location within Montana Location within the United States
- Location: Central Ave. and 1st St., Kevin, Montana
- Coordinates: 48°44′44″N 111°58′05″W
- Area: 0.3 acres (0.12 ha)
- Built: 1903
- Built by: Great Northern Railroad
- NRHP reference No.: 80002433
- Added to NRHP: August 11, 1980

Kevin station, in Kevin, Montana, was built by the Great Northern Railroad in Kevin, Montana in 1903. It was listed on the National Register of Historic Places in 1980 as the Kevin Depot.

It was deemed to be "architecturally significant because it is typical of small town stations of turn-of-the-century Montana. The Great Northern Railroad created the Kevin site for steam locomotives to take on water half-way on their journey from the high-line to the Canadian border. Rainwater was collected in a pit behind the station. These small stations have all but disappeared; Kevin is one of the few left."

It is a 24 by 84 feet (7.3 m × 25.6 m) structure with a square bay on one side and an addition built in 1925. It was moved two blocks from its railroad right-of-way location in 1979, with intention that the moved building would be used as a senior citizens center.

Preceding station	Great Northern Railway	Following station
Sunburst toward Sweet Grass	Sweet Grass – Shelby	Shelby Terminus
