= Hillside Colony =

Hillside Colony may refer to:

- Hillside Colony, Montana
- Hillside Colony, South Dakota
