= KSEN =

- Shelby, Montana; United States
- Frequency: 1150 kHz
- Branding: KSEN AM 1150

Programming
- Format: Oldies
- Affiliations: ABC News Radio

Ownership
- Owner: Townsquare Media; (Townsquare License, LLC)
- Sister stations: KZIN-FM

History
- First air date: August 11, 1947
- Former call signs: KIYI (1947–1959)

Technical information
- Licensing authority: FCC
- Facility ID: 67655
- Class: B
- Power: 10,000 watts day; 5,000 watts night
- Transmitter coordinates: 48°28′52″N 111°53′02″W

Links
- Public license information: Public file; LMS
- Webcast: Listen Live
- Website: ksenam.com

KSEN (1150 AM) is a radio station licensed to serve Shelby, Montana. The station is owned by Townsquare Media, and licensed to Townsquare License, LLC. It airs an oldies music format.

The station's studios are at 830 Oilfield Avenue in Shelby, along with KZIN-FM. The transmitter site is south of town, along Interstate 15.

The station signed on August 11, 1947, as KIYI. It was assigned the KSEN call letters by the Federal Communications Commission on May 27, 1959.

On November 17th, 1977 KSEN and the bowling ally went up in flames, caused by a faulty electrical outlet behind a teletype machine. The entire building was a complete loss.

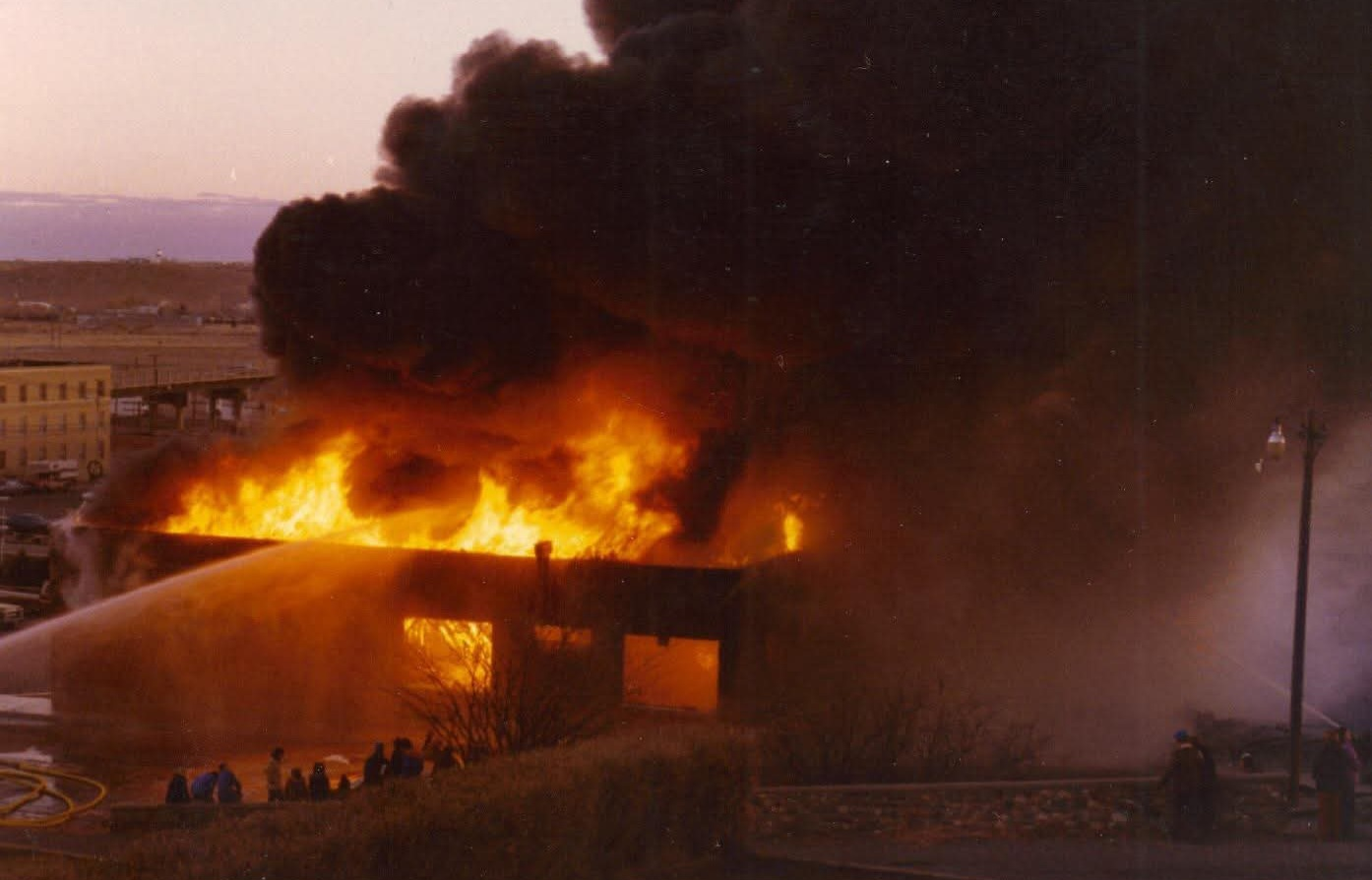
KSEN Fire

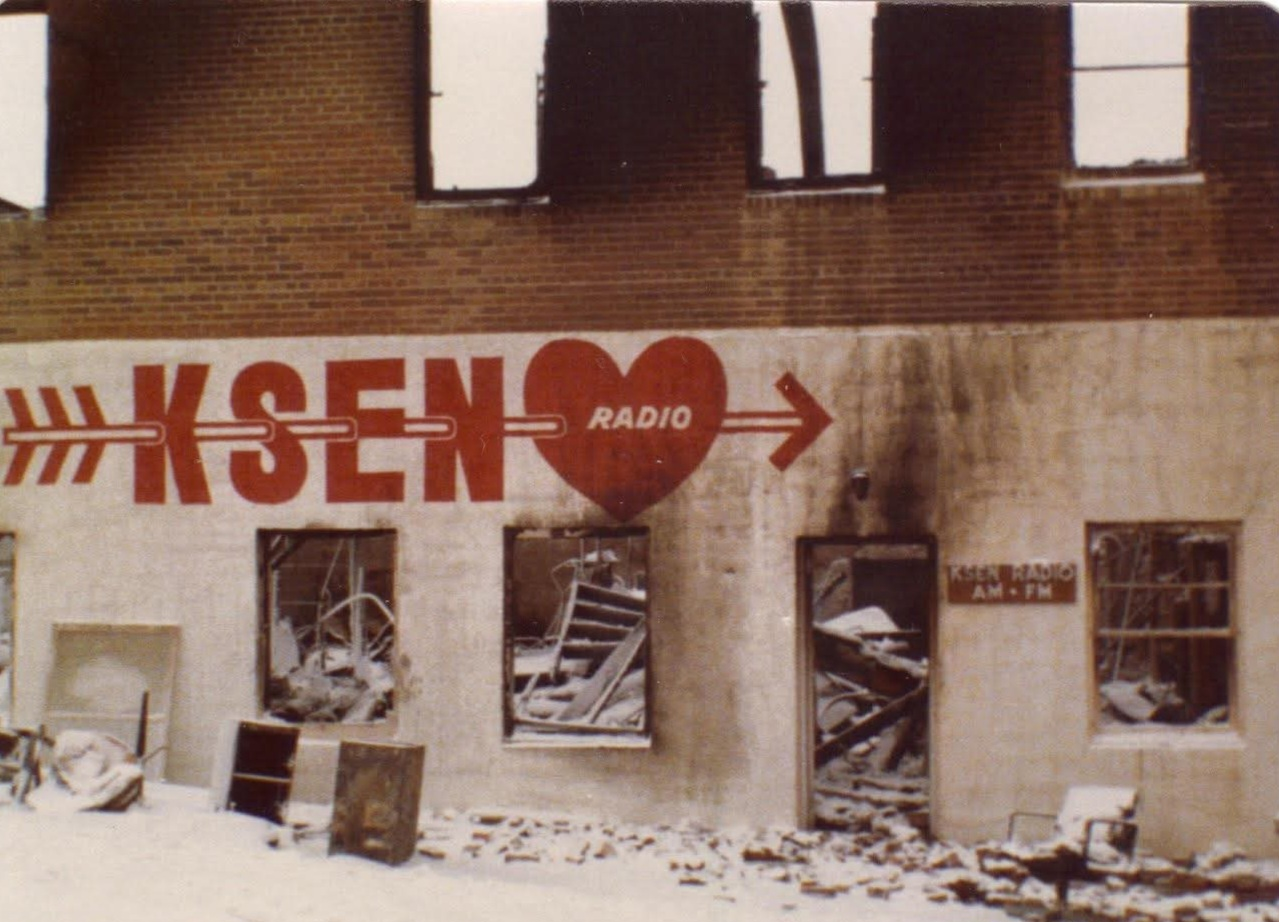
KSEN Fire

== Ownership ==
In February 2008, Colorado-based GAPWEST Broadcasting completed the acquisition of 57 radio stations in 13 markets in the Pacific Northwest-Rocky Mountain region from Clear Channel Communications. The deal, valued at a reported $74 million, included two stations in Shelby, six Bozeman stations, seven in Missoula, and five in Billings, Montana. Other stations in the deal are located in Casper and Cheyenne, Wyoming, plus Pocatello and Twin Falls, Idaho, and Yakima, Washington. GapWest was folded into Townsquare Media on August 13, 2010.
