= Rim Rock Wind Farm =

Wind farm in Montana, USA

- Official name: Rim Rock Wind Farm
- Country: United States
- Location: Glacier and Toole County near Cut Bank, Montana
- Coordinates: 48°50′10″N 112°03′44″W
- Status: Operational
- Construction began: October 2011
- Commission date: December 2012
- Construction cost: $370 million
- Owner: NaturEner
- Operator: NaturEner

Wind farm
- Type: Onshore

Power generation
- Units operational: 126 turbines
- Make and model: Acciona AW77 1.5 MW
- Nameplate capacity: 189 MW
- Capacity factor: 34.8% (average 2013-2019)
- Annual net output: 577 GW·h

Rim Rock Wind Farm is located near Cut Bank, Montana. Owned by NaturEner, this $370 million, 189 megawatt (MW) wind farm has been operational since 2012, and is Montana's largest wind-producing facility to be built in a single phase.

== Details ==
The project was originally developed by Great Plains Wind & Energy LLC, and purchased in 2006 by the Spanish company NaturEner. NaturEner subsequently partnered with Morgan Stanley to finance the facility. Construction began in October 2011, and operation began in December 2012. There are 126 Acciona AW77 wind turbines, rated to operate at 1.5 MW each. This is NaturEner's third project in the United States, and nearly doubled the company's electricity production in the country when completed. The energy harnessed is used to power approximately 60,000 homes in Toole and Glacier counties in Montana, as well as in California.

In December 2013, San Diego Gas & Electric filed a lawsuit against NaturEner, claiming that NaturEner hid the possibility that nearby eagles would be harmed by the wind farm. NaturEner in turn filed a lawsuit against the state utility, claiming that the utility wanted out of the contract. Justices of the Montana Supreme Court ruled that the contractual issue would have to be resolved in Californian courts (and not Montana courts). No further announcements on the case have been made.

== Electricity production ==
Rim Rock Wind Electricity Generation (MW·h)
Year	Total Annual MW·h
2012	56,893*
2013	335,840
2014	562,316
2015	603,536
2016	652,904
2017	657,608
2018	628,130
2019	597,163
Average (years 2013–2018) --->	576,785

(*) partial year of operation

== See also ==
- Wind power in Montana
- Glacier Wind Farm
- List of wind farms in the United States
