= Naismith, Montana =

- Unincorporated community
- Location within Montana Location within the United States
- Coordinates: 48°23′11″N 111°46′28″W
- Country: United States
- State: Montana
- County: Toole
- Elevation: 3,055 ft (931 m)
- Time zone: UTC-7 (Mountain (MST))
  - Summer (DST): UTC-6 (MDT)
- GNIS feature ID: 774545

Naismith is an unincorporated community in Toole County, Montana, United States, located approximately 90 miles (140 km) north of Great Falls.
