= Solar power in Montana =

Overview of solar power in the U.S. state of Montana

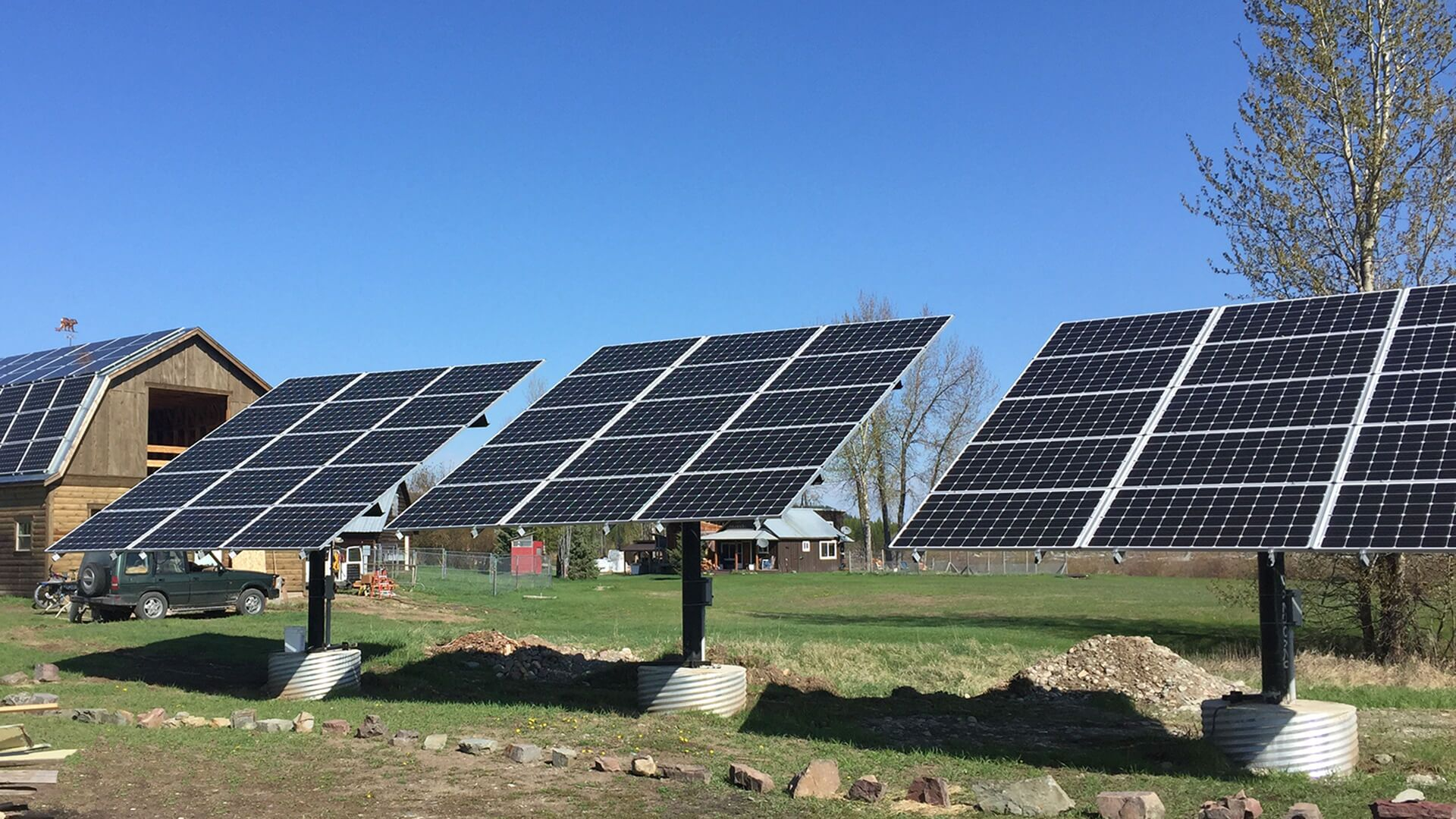
Solar panels, Polebridge

In 2016, it was estimated that solar power in Montana on rooftops could provide 28% of all electricity used in Montana from 3,200 MW of solar panels.

Net metering is available to all consumers for up to at least 10 kW generation. Excess generation is rolled over each month but is lost once each year.

== Statistics ==
Source: NREL

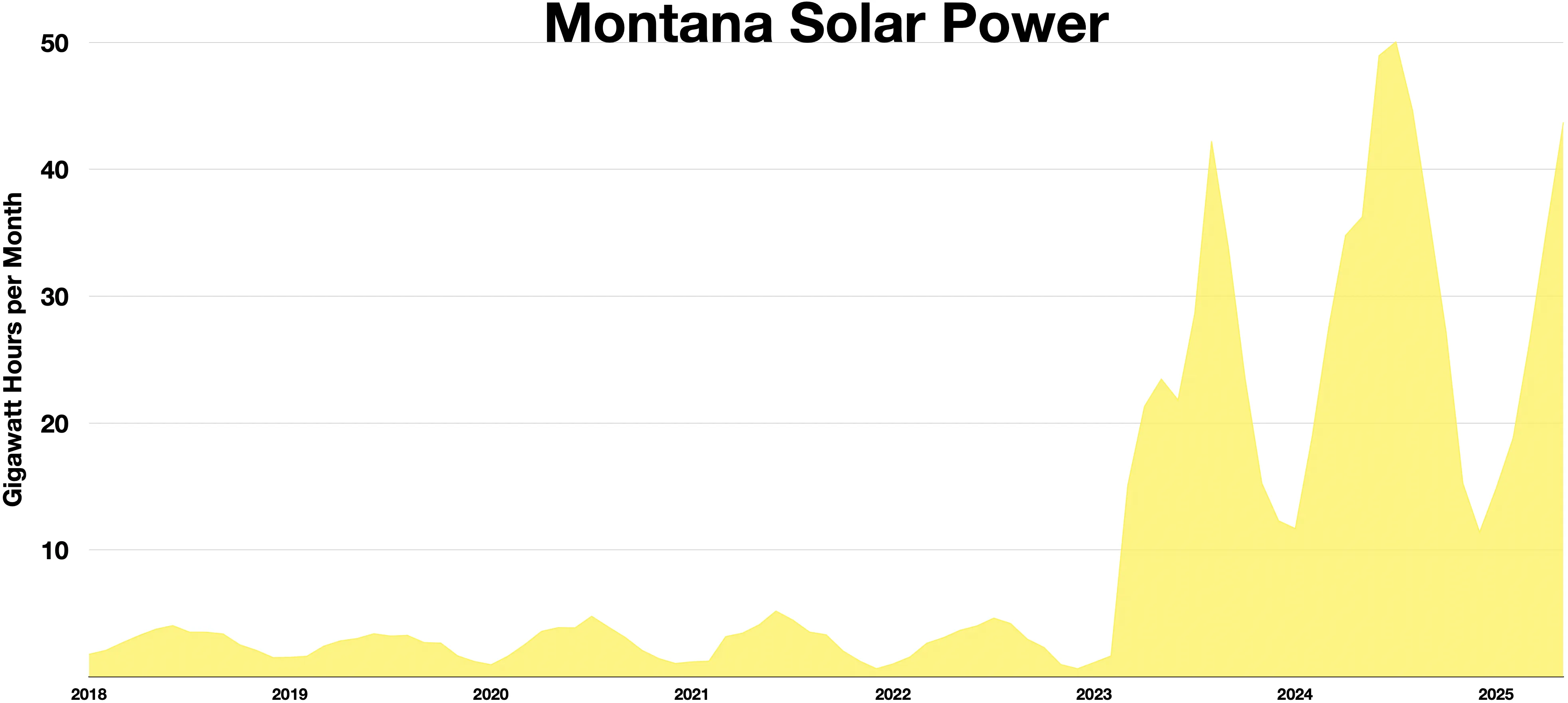
Montana solar power

Grid-connected PV capacity (MW)
Year	Capacity	Change	% change
2007	0.5		
2008	0.7	0.2	40%
2009	0.7	0	0%
2010	0.7	0	0%
2011	0.7	0	0%
2012	2.2	1.4	200%
2013	3.0	0.9	41%
2014	4.0	1.0	33%
2015	4.5	0.5	12%
2016	5.5	1	22%
2017	54	48.5	881%
2018	55	1	1%
2019	60.4	5.4	9%
2020	116.8	56.4	93%
2021	122.7	5.9	%
2022	133	10.3	%

Utility-scale solar generation in Montana (GWh)
Year	Total	Jan	Feb	Mar	Apr	May	Jun	Jul	Aug	Sep	Oct	Nov	Dec
2017	13	0	0	0	1	2	2	1	1	2	2	1	1
2018	35	2	2	3	3	4	4	4	4	3	3	2	1
2019	30	2	2	2	3	3	3	3	3	3	3	2	1
2020	34	1	2	3	4	4	4	5	4	3	2	1	1
2021	25	1	1	3	3	4	5	4	4				

== See also ==
- Wind power in Montana
- Solar power in the United States
- Renewable energy in the United States
