= Hillside Colony, Montana =

- Census-designated place
- Location within Montana Location within the United States
- Coordinates: 48°58′44″N 112°4′7″W
- Country: United States
- State: Montana
- County: Toole

Area
  - Total: 0.34 sq mi (0.87 km^{2})
  - Land: 0.34 sq mi (0.87 km^{2})
  - Water: 0 sq mi (0.00 km^{2})
- Elevation: 3,595 ft (1,096 m)

Population (2020)
  - Total: 0
  - Density: 0/sq mi (0/km^{2})
- Time zone: UTC-7 (Mountain (MST))
  - Summer (DST): UTC-6 (MDT)
- ZIP Code: 59482 (Sunburst)
- Area code: 406
- FIPS code: 30-36385
- GNIS feature ID: 2806675

Hillside Colony is a Hutterite community and census-designated place (CDP) in Toole County, Montana, United States. It is in the northwest corner of the county, 5 miles (8 km) west of Interstate 15 at Sweet Grass and 1 mile (1.6 km) south of the Canadian border.

Hillside Colony was first listed as a CDP prior to the 2020 census.

As of the 2020 census, Hillside Colony had a population of 0.

== Demographics ==
Historical population
Census	Pop.	Note	%±
2020	0		—
U.S. Decennial Census
