= Oilmont, Montana =

- Unincorporated community
- Location within Montana Location within the United States
- Coordinates: 48°44′24″N 111°50′27″W
- Country: United States
- State: Montana
- County: Toole
- Elevation: 3,501 ft (1,067 m)
- Time zone: UTC-7 (Mountain (MST))
  - Summer (DST): UTC-6 (MDT)
- ZIP code: 59466
- Area code: 406
- GNIS feature ID: 774918

Oilmont was an unincorporated community in Toole County, Montana, United States. Interstate 15 passes near the community, with access from Exit 379.

It is the location of Bethany Lutheran Church, which is listed on the National Register of Historic Places. The Absure Refinery processed petroleum from the nearby Kevin Sunburst Oil Field.

The community was abandoned when chemicals used in oil extraction contaminated the local water table.

== Climate ==
Dunkirk 19NNE is a nearby weather station, located 16 miles (25.7 km) west of Oilmont. Dunkirk 19NNE has a cold semi-arid climate (Köppen BSk).

Climate data for Dunkirk 19NNE, Montana, 1991–2020 normals, 1922-2020 extremes: 3323ft (1013m)
Month	Jan	Feb	Mar	Apr	May	Jun	Jul	Aug	Sep	Oct	Nov	Dec	Year
Record high °F (°C)	63 (17)	69 (21)	79 (26)	89 (32)	94 (34)	102 (39)	105 (41)	108 (42)	98 (37)	90 (32)	74 (23)	68 (20)	108 (42)
Mean maximum °F (°C)	52.9 (11.6)	52.6 (11.4)	63.1 (17.3)	75.8 (24.3)	83.6 (28.7)	89.1 (31.7)	96.2 (35.7)	95.2 (35.1)	89.6 (32.0)	78.2 (25.7)	63.6 (17.6)	52.2 (11.2)	97.6 (36.4)
Mean daily maximum °F (°C)	29.4 (−1.4)	33.6 (0.9)	43.0 (6.1)	55.0 (12.8)	65.1 (18.4)	72.3 (22.4)	81.9 (27.7)	81.3 (27.4)	70.4 (21.3)	56.5 (13.6)	41.4 (5.2)	32.1 (0.1)	55.2 (12.9)
Daily mean °F (°C)	16.9 (−8.4)	20.2 (−6.6)	29.8 (−1.2)	41.1 (5.1)	51.2 (10.7)	58.7 (14.8)	65.9 (18.8)	64.9 (18.3)	54.6 (12.6)	41.3 (5.2)	28.2 (−2.1)	18.9 (−7.3)	41.0 (5.0)
Mean daily minimum °F (°C)	4.5 (−15.3)	6.8 (−14.0)	16.6 (−8.6)	27.1 (−2.7)	37.4 (3.0)	45.1 (7.3)	49.9 (9.9)	48.5 (9.2)	38.8 (3.8)	26.1 (−3.3)	14.9 (−9.5)	5.8 (−14.6)	26.8 (−2.9)
Mean minimum °F (°C)	−24.3 (−31.3)	−17.9 (−27.7)	−7.3 (−21.8)	10.3 (−12.1)	21.5 (−5.8)	33.9 (1.1)	37.8 (3.2)	35.8 (2.1)	26.4 (−3.1)	6.7 (−14.1)	−8.4 (−22.4)	−19.2 (−28.4)	−31.3 (−35.2)
Record low °F (°C)	−46 (−43)	−42 (−41)	−34 (−37)	−17 (−27)	7 (−14)	22 (−6)	31 (−1)	29 (−2)	2 (−17)	−15 (−26)	−33 (−36)	−40 (−40)	−46 (−43)
Average precipitation inches (mm)	0.33 (8.4)	0.28 (7.1)	0.42 (11)	0.99 (25)	1.67 (42)	2.61 (66)	1.10 (28)	0.88 (22)	1.05 (27)	0.58 (15)	0.44 (11)	0.29 (7.4)	10.64 (269.9)
Average snowfall inches (cm)	5.0 (13)	5.2 (13)	4.9 (12)	3.7 (9.4)	0.5 (1.3)	0.1 (0.25)	0.0 (0.0)	0.0 (0.0)	0.3 (0.76)	2.2 (5.6)	4.5 (11)	5.5 (14)	31.9 (80.31)
Source 1: NOAA
Source 2: XMACIS (2002-2020 snowfall, temp records & monthly max/mins)
