= KZIN-FM =

- Shelby, Montana; United States
- Frequency: 96.7 MHz
- Branding: K96 FM

Programming
- Format: Country

Ownership
- Owner: Townsquare Media; (Townsquare License, LLC)
- Sister stations: KSEN

History
- First air date: December 9, 1978
- Former frequencies: 96.3 MHz

Technical information
- Licensing authority: FCC
- Facility ID: 68295
- Class: C1
- ERP: 100,000 watts
- HAAT: 168 meters (552 feet)
- Transmitter coordinates: 48°19′42″N 112°02′03″W

Links
- Public license information: Public file; LMS
- Webcast: Listen Live
- Website: k96fm.com

KZIN-FM (96.7 MHz, "Wide Open Country"), is a radio station licensed to serve Shelby, Montana. The station is owned by Townsquare Media and licensed to Townsquare License, LLC. It airs a country music format.

The station's studios are at 830 Oilfield Avenue in Shelby, along with KSEN; the transmitter site is located on Cathedral Road, southwest of Shelby. It began broadcasting on December 9, 1978, delayed by nine months after a major 1977 fire destroyed KSEN's studios.
