= Shelby station =

Train Station in Shelby, Montana

Shelby, MT
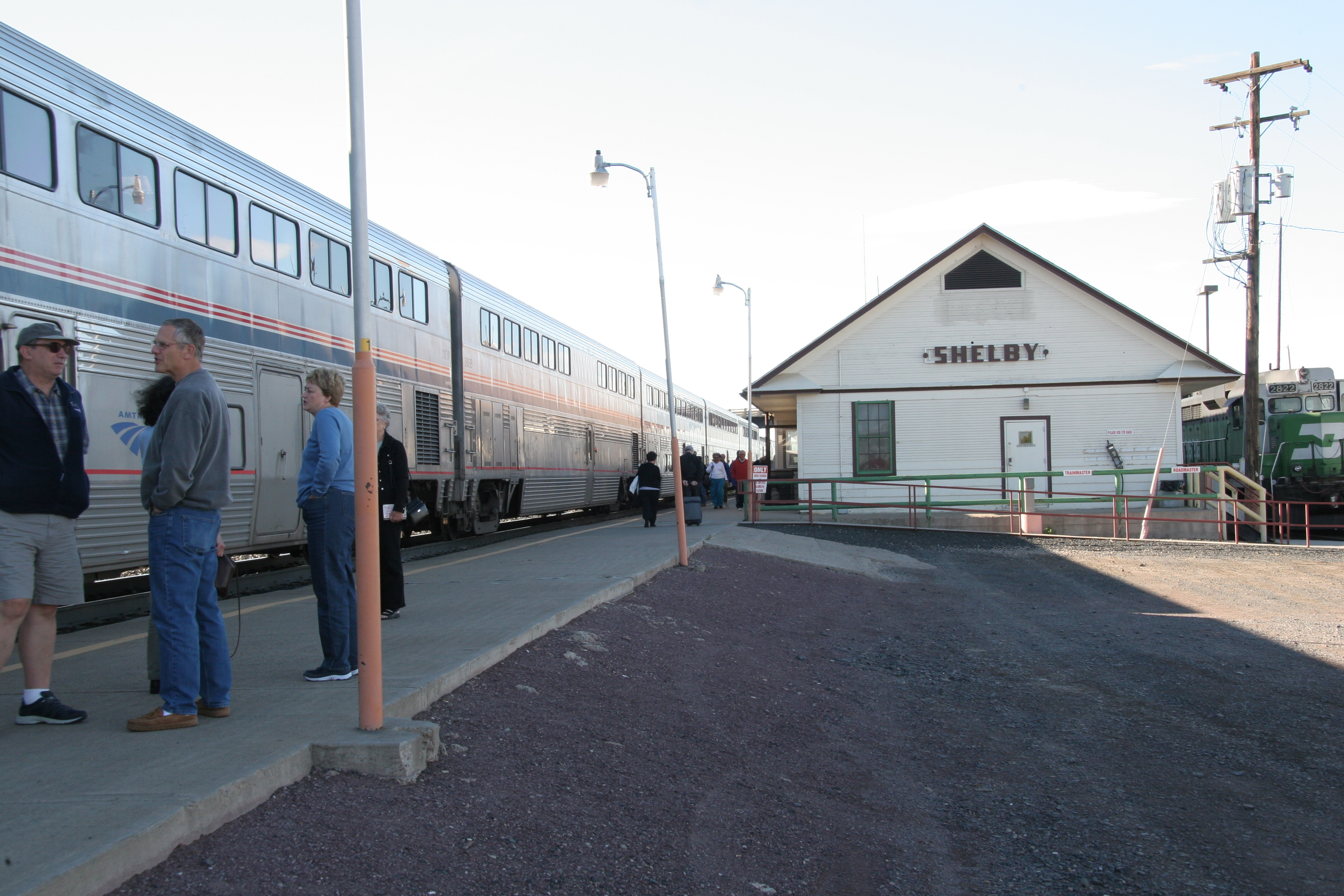

General information
- Location: 230 West Central Avenue; Shelby, Montana; United States
- Coordinates: 48.5069°N 111.8572°W
- Owner: BNSF Railway
- Line: BNSF Hi Line Subdivision
- Platforms: 1 side platform
- Tracks: 3

Construction
- Parking: Yes
- Accessible: Yes

Other information
- Station code: Amtrak: SBY

History
- Opened: June 18, 1893

Passengers
- FY 2025: 7,107 (Amtrak)

Services
Preceding station	Amtrak	Following station
Cut Bank toward Seattle or Portland	Empire Builder	Havre toward Chicago
Former services
Preceding station	Great Northern Railway	Following station
Ethridge toward Seattle	Main Line	Dunkirk toward St. Paul
Terminus	Shelby – Billings	Andale toward Billings
Kevin toward Sweet Grass	Sweet Grass – Shelby	Terminus
Location

Shelby station is a station stop for the Amtrak Empire Builder line in Shelby, Montana. Near U.S. Highway 2, the station is adjacent to downtown Shelby. The station, platform, and parking are owned by BNSF Railway.

Continuing passengers on both westbound and eastbound Empire Builder are allowed to step off the train at Shelby. Due to "padding" in the westbound schedule, if the westbound Empire Builder is on-time into Shelby, the stop in Shelby can be as long as a train service stop.
