= Sunburst, Montana =

- Town
- Location of Sunburst, Montana
- Coordinates: 48°52′25″N 111°54′20″W
- Country: United States
- State: Montana
- County: Toole

Area
  - Total: 2.18 sq mi (5.65 km^{2})
  - Land: 1.92 sq mi (4.97 km^{2})
  - Water: 0.26 sq mi (0.68 km^{2})
- Elevation: 3,327 ft (1,014 m)

Population (2020)
  - Total: 333
  - Density: 173.6/sq mi (67.02/km^{2})
- Time zone: UTC-7 (Mountain (MST))
  - Summer (DST): UTC-6 (MDT)
- ZIP code: 59482
- Area code: 406
- FIPS code: 30-72175
- GNIS feature ID: 2413350
- Website: www.townofsunburst.com

Sunburst is a town in Toole County, Montana, United States. The population was 333 in the 2020 census.

Sunburst is 30 miles (48 km) north of Shelby and 9 miles (14 km) south of the Canada–US border.

== History ==
Sunburst has its origins as a farming community and later saw significant population growth after oil development occurred in the 1920s. A refinery was built in 1922 with the discovery of oil in the Kevin Sunburst Oil Field. Since oil development in the area ceased in the 1970s, Sunburst has once again become a primarily agricultural town. The local high school gives homage to its past, as its students are known as the Sunburst Refiners. Its name comes from what is considered a dramatic sunrise that occurs when the sun comes over the Sweetgrass Hills and illuminates the local fields.

Sunburst incorporated in 1924.

== Geography ==
Interstate 15 passes through the community, with access from Exit 389. The Long Lake Waterfowl Production Area is nearby.

According to the United States Census Bureau, the town has a total area of 1.99 square miles (5.15 km^{2}), of which 1.75 square miles (4.53 km^{2}) is land and 0.24 square miles (0.62 km^{2}) is water.

=== Climate ===
According to the Köppen Climate Classification system, Sunburst has a semi-arid climate, abbreviated "BSk" on climate maps.

== Demographics ==
Historical population
Census	Pop.	Note	%±
1930	486		—
1940	709		45.9%
1950	845		19.2%
1960	882		4.4%
1970	604		−31.5%
1980	476		−21.2%
1990	437		−8.2%
2000	415		−5.0%
2010	375		−9.6%
2020	333		−11.2%
U.S. Decennial Census

As of 2000 the median income for a household in the town was $58,250, and the median income for a family was $56,038. Males had a median income of $34,500 versus $11,333 for females. The per capita income for the town was $20,244. About 1.7% of families and 4.1% of the population were below the poverty line, including 4.4% of those under age 18 and 3.7% of those age 65 or over.

=== 2010 census ===
As of the census of 2010, there were 375 people, 150 households, and 107 families residing in the town. The population density was 214.3 inhabitants per square mile (82.7/km^{2}). There were 176 housing units at an average density of 100.6 per square mile (38.8/km^{2}). The racial makeup of the town was 94.9% White, 0.5% Native American, 0.5% from other races, and 4.0% from two or more races. Hispanic or Latino of any race were 2.7% of the population.

There were 150 households, of which 34.0% had children under the age of 18 living with them, 60.7% were married couples living together, 6.7% had a female householder with no husband present, 4.0% had a male householder with no wife present, and 28.7% were non-families. 27.3% of all households were made up of individuals, and 12% had someone living alone who was 65 years of age or older. The average household size was 2.50 and the average family size was 2.98.

The median age in the town was 39.4 years. 25.1% of residents were under the age of 18; 7.2% were between the ages of 18 and 24; 22.1% were from 25 to 44; 31.9% were from 45 to 64; and 13.6% were 65 years of age or older. The gender makeup of the town was 49.6% male and 50.4% female.

== Arts and culture ==
Sunburst Gala Days is held every summer and benefits the town's swimming pool.

The town built a community center in 2021.

Sunburst Public Library serves the community.

== Government ==
Holly Hovland was re-elected mayor in November 2025.

== Education ==
Sunburst Schools educates students from kindergarten through 12th grade. North Toole County High School's team name is the Refiners.
