= Toole County, Montana =

County in Montana, United States

- County
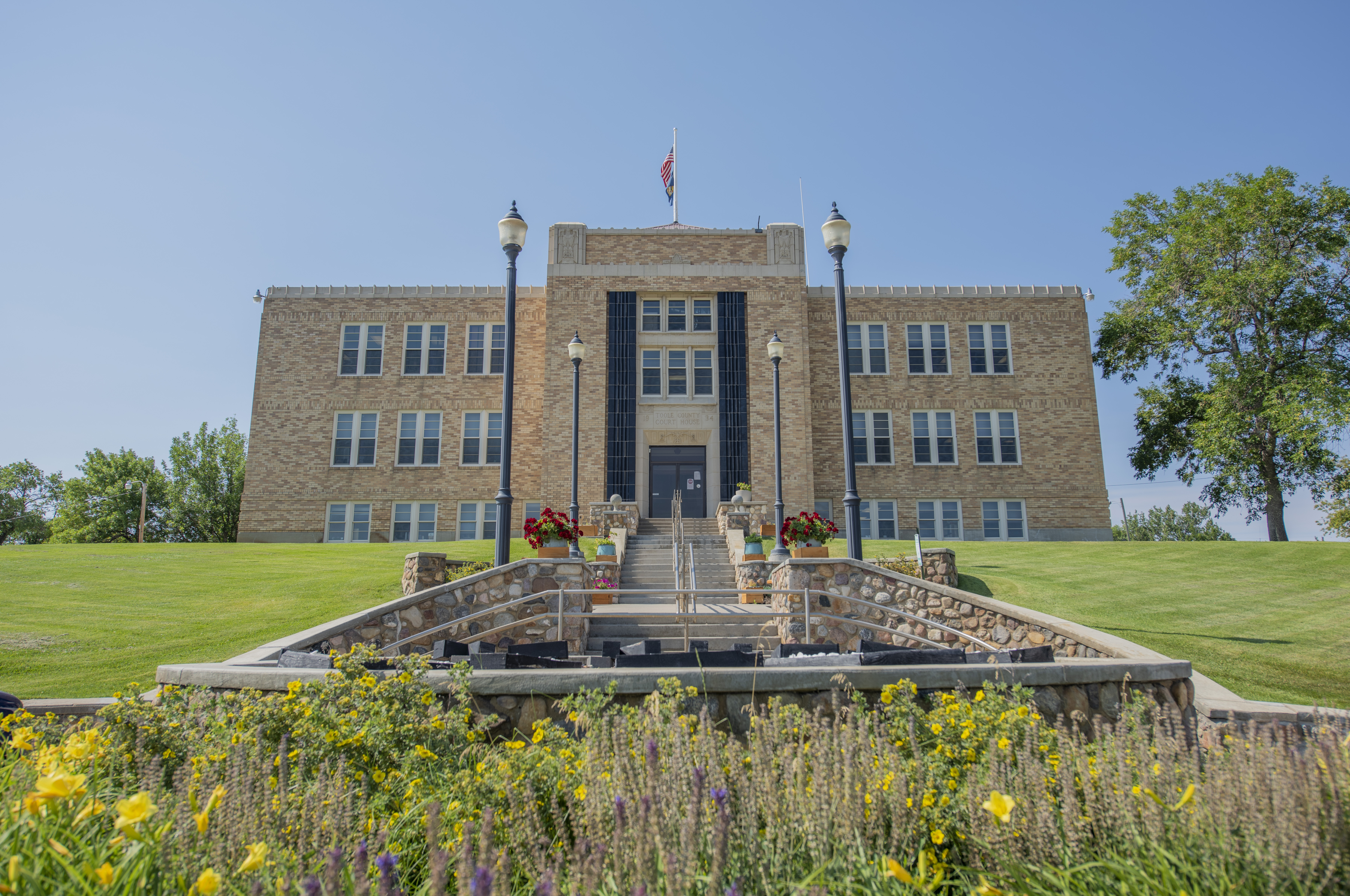
- Toole County Courthouse in Shelby

- Location within the U.S. state of Montana
- Coordinates: 48°39′N 111°41′W
- Country: United States
- State: Montana
- Founded: 1914
- Named for: Joseph Toole
- Seat: Shelby
- Largest city: Shelby

Area
  - Total: 1,946 sq mi (5,040 km^{2})
  - Land: 1,916 sq mi (4,960 km^{2})
  - Water: 30 sq mi (78 km^{2}) 1.5%

Population (2020)
  - Total: 4,971
  - Estimate (2025): 5,211 ▲
  - Density: 2.7/sq mi (1.0/km^{2})
- Time zone: UTC−7 (Mountain)
  - Summer (DST): UTC−6 (MDT)
- Congressional district: 2nd
- Website: www.toolecountymt.gov
- Montana county number 21

Toole County is a county in the northern portion of the U.S. state of Montana. As of the 2020 census, the population was 4,971. Its county seat is Shelby. The county was established in 1914 from parts of Hill County and Teton County and was named after Joseph Toole, the first and fourth governor of Montana. Its northern boundary is the Canada–United States border south of Alberta.

== Geography ==
According to the United States Census Bureau, the county has a total area of 1,946 square miles (5,040 km^{2}), of which 1,916 square miles (4,960 km^{2}) is land and 30 square miles (78 km^{2}) (1.5%) is water.

Its northern boundary is the Canada–United States border. A part of its southern boundary by the southwestern county corner is formed by Marias River, which flows eastward through the southern part of the county. In 2009 a 14 mile stretch of the river was designated as Marias River State Park. In the eastern part are several creeks, the largest of which is Willow, which rises in the Sweet Grass Hills and follows a southerly course through the county. In the Sweet Grass Hills and elsewhere indications of oil and gas have been found.

=== Major highways ===
- Interstate 15 - connects to Alberta Highway 4 at Canadian border
- U.S. Route 2

=== Adjacent counties ===
- Glacier County - west
- Pondera County - south
- Liberty County - east
- County of Warner No. 5, Alberta - north
- County of Forty Mile No. 8, Alberta - northeast

== Demographics ==
Historical population
Census	Pop.	Note	%±
1920	3,724		—
1930	6,714		80.3%
1940	6,769		0.8%
1950	6,867		1.4%
1960	7,904		15.1%
1970	5,839		−26.1%
1980	5,559		−4.8%
1990	5,046		−9.2%
2000	5,267		4.4%
2010	5,324		1.1%
2020	4,971		−6.6%
2025 (est.)	5,211	▲	4.8%
U.S. Decennial Census:

=== 2020 census ===
As of the 2020 census, the county had a population of 4,971. Of the residents, 20.1% were under the age of 18 and 18.0% were 65 years of age or older; the median age was 41.0 years. For every 100 females there were 135.7 males, and for every 100 females age 18 and over there were 143.8 males. 0.0% of residents lived in urban areas and 100.0% lived in rural areas.

The racial makeup of the county was 85.9% White, 0.6% Black or African American, 7.0% American Indian and Alaska Native, 0.7% Asian, 0.9% from some other race, and 4.8% from two or more races. Hispanic or Latino residents of any race comprised 3.6% of the population.

There were 1,748 households in the county, of which 24.8% had children under the age of 18 living with them and 23.8% had a female householder with no spouse or partner present. About 34.5% of all households were made up of individuals and 14.8% had someone living alone who was 65 years of age or older.

There were 2,320 housing units, of which 24.7% were vacant. Among occupied housing units, 68.5% were owner-occupied and 31.5% were renter-occupied. The homeowner vacancy rate was 5.6% and the rental vacancy rate was 21.5%.

=== 2010 census ===
As of the 2010 census, there were 5,324 people, 2,015 households, and 1,246 families in the county. The population density was 2.8 inhabitants per square mile (1.1/km^{2}). There were 2,336 housing units at an average density of 1.2 units per square mile (0.46 units/km^{2}). The racial makeup of the county was 92.0% white, 4.5% American Indian, 0.5% black or African American, 0.4% Asian, 0.6% from other races, and 1.9% from two or more races. Those of Hispanic or Latino origin made up 2.4% of the population. In terms of ancestry, 30.8% were German, 17.7% were Irish, 15.8% were English, 10.5% were Norwegian, and 3.6% were American.

Of the 2,015 households, 27.3% had children under the age of 18 living with them, 49.8% were married couples living together, 7.4% had a female householder with no husband present, 38.2% were non-families, and 34.3% of all households were made up of individuals. The average household size was 2.26 and the average family size was 2.88. The median age was 41.5 years.

The median income for a household in the county was $42,949 and the median income for a family was $54,722. Males had a median income of $41,490 versus $32,582 for females. The per capita income for the county was $20,464. About 11.3% of families and 15.7% of the population were below the poverty line, including 23.2% of those under age 18 and 8.0% of those age 65 or over.

== Politics ==
Toole County voters have only selected Republican Party candidates in national elections since 1964.

United States presidential election results for Toole County, Montana
Year	Republican		Democratic		Third party(ies)	
Year	No.	%	No.	%	No.	%
1916	698	35.40%	1,075	54.51%	199	10.09%
1920	861	61.28%	405	28.83%	139	9.89%
1924	697	37.49%	439	23.61%	723	38.89%
1928	1,325	54.71%	1,076	44.43%	21	0.87%
1932	862	29.99%	1,917	66.70%	95	3.31%
1936	654	22.68%	2,120	73.51%	110	3.81%
1940	1,218	38.28%	1,954	61.41%	10	0.31%
1944	1,113	41.72%	1,545	57.91%	10	0.37%
1948	1,092	37.81%	1,756	60.80%	40	1.39%
1952	1,853	56.25%	1,426	43.29%	15	0.46%
1956	1,927	56.89%	1,460	43.11%	0	0.00%
1960	1,577	47.10%	1,767	52.78%	4	0.12%
1964	1,223	42.55%	1,649	57.38%	2	0.07%
1968	1,407	51.96%	1,048	38.70%	253	9.34%
1972	1,679	59.64%	897	31.87%	239	8.49%
1976	1,469	56.43%	1,080	41.49%	54	2.07%
1980	2,000	70.18%	634	22.25%	216	7.58%
1984	1,949	70.41%	789	28.50%	30	1.08%
1988	1,505	57.14%	1,070	40.62%	59	2.24%
1992	943	34.71%	854	31.43%	920	33.86%
1996	1,203	48.47%	874	35.21%	405	16.32%
2000	1,639	68.92%	630	26.49%	109	4.58%
2004	1,583	68.50%	690	29.86%	38	1.64%
2008	1,317	62.09%	737	34.75%	67	3.16%
2012	1,440	68.51%	582	27.69%	80	3.81%
2016	1,497	73.49%	402	19.73%	138	6.77%
2020	1,596	75.32%	467	22.04%	56	2.64%
2024	1,571	76.78%	415	20.28%	60	2.93%

== Communities ==
=== City ===
- Shelby (county seat)

=== Towns ===
- Kevin
- Sunburst

=== Census-designated places ===
- Camrose Colony
- Hillside Colony
- Rimrock Colony
- Sweet Grass

=== Other unincorporated communities ===
- Devon
- Dunkirk
- Ethridge
- Ferdig
- Galata
- Gold Butte
- Kippen
- Naismith
- Ohio Camp
- Oilmont
- Virden

== Notable people ==
- Earl W. Bascom (1906–1995), "Father of Modern Rodeo" and Hall of Fame cowboy, artist, sculptor, actor, inventor; cowboyed in the 1920s on a ranch on Kicking Horse Creek once owned by his cousin C.M. Russell
- Charles M. Russell (1864–1926), cowboy artist and sculptor; ranched on Kicking Horse Creek near the Sweetgrass Hills; honored in the Hall of Great Westerners in Oklahoma City

== See also ==
- List of lakes in Toole County, Montana
- List of mountains in Toole County, Montana
- National Register of Historic Places listings in Toole County, Montana
