= Shelby, Montana =

City in Montana, United States

- City
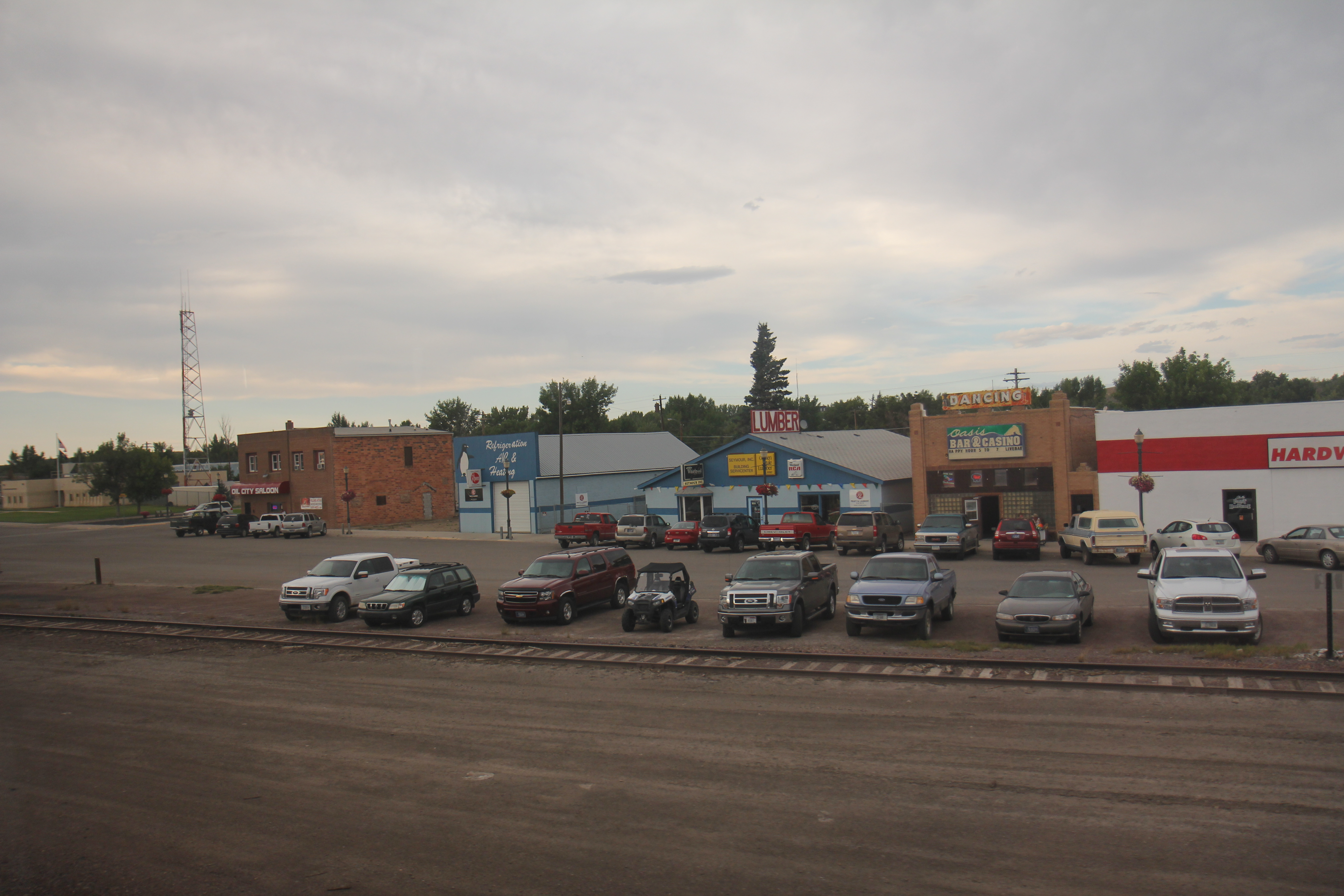
- Downtown Shelby

- Location of Shelby, Montana
- Coordinates: 48°30′26″N 111°51′37″W
- Country: United States
- State: Montana
- County: Toole

Area
  - Total: 5.96 sq mi (15.43 km^{2})
  - Land: 5.78 sq mi (14.97 km^{2})
  - Water: 0.17 sq mi (0.45 km^{2})
- Elevation: 3,297 ft (1,005 m)

Population (2020)
  - Total: 3,169
  - Density: 548.1/sq mi (211.63/km^{2})
- Time zone: UTC-7 (Mountain (MST))
  - Summer (DST): UTC-6 (MDT)
- ZIP code: 59474
- Area code: 406
- FIPS code: 30-67450
- GNIS feature ID: 0776465
- Website: shelbymt.com

Shelby is a city in and the county seat of Toole County, Montana, United States. The population was 3,169 at the 2020 census.

Shelby is roughly 85 miles (137 km) north of Great Falls, 172 miles (277 km) north of Helena and 35 miles (56 km) south of the Canada-U.S Border.

== History ==
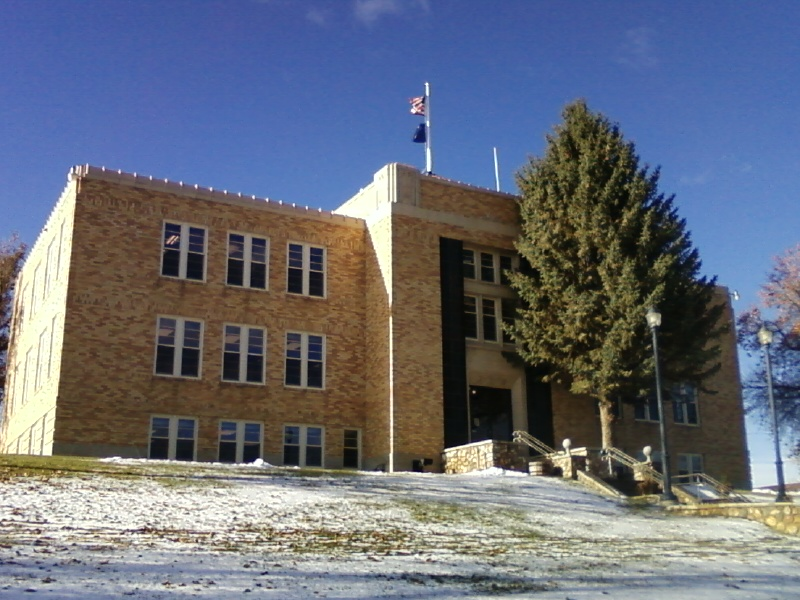
Toole County Courthouse

Shelby was named in honor of Peter O. Shelby, general manager of the Montana Central Railway. A railroad station was established here in about 1892, at the junction of the Great Northern Railway and the Great Falls & Canada Railway.

On July 4, 1923, the town hosted a heavyweight boxing match between Jack Dempsey and Tommy Gibbons for the undisputed world heavyweight boxing championship title. This event almost bankrupted the town of Shelby.

In the early 2000s the town hosted a dog camp that made national news. It was named Camp Collie and helped mistreated dogs.

Welker Farms, an agricultural operation known for its popular social media channels, is located near Shelby.

The Well Done Foundation, which plugs orphaned and abandoned oil wells, opened a visitors' center in Shelby in 2020.

== Geography ==
Shelby is near the Marias River and Aloe Lake.

According to the United States Census Bureau, the city has a total area of 6.18 square miles (16.01 km^{2}), of which 6.03 square miles (15.62 km^{2}) is land and 0.15 square miles (0.39 km^{2}) is water.

=== Climate ===
Shelby has four distinct seasons, and is considered an arid climate. Long, severe winters give way to springlike weather anywhere from March to May. Summers can be dry and hot, and the area is prone to lightning, hail, and severe thunderstorms during the summer months. Fall weather is often unpredictable, with snow falling during October some years, and temperatures well into the 60s °F (10s °C) stretching until the end of November on other years. Due to the city's location just off of the Rocky Mountain Front, wind is a constant.

A weather station operated in the town from the late 1990s shows slightly higher temperatures than nearby towns such as Cut Bank.

Climate data for Shelby, Montana, 1991–2020 normals, extremes 1950–present
Month	Jan	Feb	Mar	Apr	May	Jun	Jul	Aug	Sep	Oct	Nov	Dec	Year
Record high °F (°C)	69 (21)	69 (21)	78 (26)	86 (30)	91 (33)	97 (36)	102 (39)	103 (39)	96 (36)	89 (32)	74 (23)	65 (18)	103 (39)
Mean maximum °F (°C)	55.3 (12.9)	55.9 (13.3)	64.4 (18.0)	74.3 (23.5)	83.8 (28.8)	88.9 (31.6)	96.2 (35.7)	95.7 (35.4)	89.9 (32.2)	78.2 (25.7)	64.6 (18.1)	54.1 (12.3)	96.4 (35.8)
Mean daily maximum °F (°C)	31.4 (−0.3)	35.5 (1.9)	43.9 (6.6)	54.2 (12.3)	64.4 (18.0)	72.6 (22.6)	82.2 (27.9)	82.2 (27.9)	70.9 (21.6)	56.2 (13.4)	42.0 (5.6)	33.1 (0.6)	55.7 (13.2)
Daily mean °F (°C)	18.8 (−7.3)	22.6 (−5.2)	31.2 (−0.4)	41.3 (5.2)	51.2 (10.7)	59.3 (15.2)	66.8 (19.3)	65.8 (18.8)	55.7 (13.2)	42.6 (5.9)	29.8 (−1.2)	21.1 (−6.1)	42.2 (5.7)
Mean daily minimum °F (°C)	6.1 (−14.4)	9.9 (−12.3)	18.4 (−7.6)	28.4 (−2.0)	38.0 (3.3)	46.0 (7.8)	51.5 (10.8)	49.3 (9.6)	40.5 (4.7)	29.0 (−1.7)	17.6 (−8.0)	9.1 (−12.7)	28.7 (−1.9)
Mean minimum °F (°C)	−21.6 (−29.8)	−13.8 (−25.4)	−5.7 (−20.9)	13.0 (−10.6)	23.4 (−4.8)	35.1 (1.7)	42.0 (5.6)	38.5 (3.6)	26.9 (−2.8)	10.0 (−12.2)	−5.7 (−20.9)	−16.8 (−27.1)	−28.4 (−33.6)
Record low °F (°C)	−44 (−42)	−37 (−38)	−37 (−38)	−9 (−23)	12 (−11)	30 (−1)	36 (2)	30 (−1)	16 (−9)	−12 (−24)	−31 (−35)	−36 (−38)	−44 (−42)
Average precipitation inches (mm)	0.46 (12)	0.36 (9.1)	0.63 (16)	1.34 (34)	1.77 (45)	2.85 (72)	1.14 (29)	0.85 (22)	1.01 (26)	0.74 (19)	0.52 (13)	0.46 (12)	12.13 (309.1)
Average snowfall inches (cm)	7.3 (19)	5.8 (15)	6.9 (18)	4.1 (10)	1.9 (4.8)	0.0 (0.0)	0.0 (0.0)	0.0 (0.0)	0.5 (1.3)	1.4 (3.6)	5.5 (14)	5.5 (14)	38.9 (99.7)
Average precipitation days (≥ 0.01 in)	5.1	5.4	6.0	7.3	9.3	11.1	5.8	5.7	6.1	5.4	4.6	5.2	77.0
Average snowy days (≥ 0.1 in)	4.2	4.1	3.1	1.8	0.5	0.0	0.0	0.0	0.1	0.7	2.6	3.7	20.8
Source 1: NOAA
Source 2: National Weather Service

== Demographics ==
Historical population
Census	Pop.	Note	%±
1920	537		—
1930	2,004		273.2%
1940	2,538		26.6%
1950	3,058		20.5%
1960	4,017		31.4%
1970	3,111		−22.6%
1980	3,142		1.0%
1990	2,763		−12.1%
2000	3,216		16.4%
2010	3,376		5.0%
2020	3,169		−6.1%
U.S. Decennial Census

=== 2020 census ===
As of the 2020 census, Shelby had a population of 3,169. The median age was 39.0 years. 18.6% of residents were under the age of 18 and 16.5% of residents were 65 years of age or older. For every 100 females there were 156.2 males, and for every 100 females age 18 and over there were 169.9 males age 18 and over.

0.0% of residents lived in urban areas, while 100.0% lived in rural areas.

There were 1,066 households in Shelby, of which 25.4% had children under the age of 18 living in them. Of all households, 41.1% were married-couple households, 24.2% were households with a male householder and no spouse or partner present, and 28.5% were households with a female householder and no spouse or partner present. About 37.9% of all households were made up of individuals and 15.3% had someone living alone who was 65 years of age or older.

There were 1,383 housing units, of which 22.9% were vacant. The homeowner vacancy rate was 7.3% and the rental vacancy rate was 23.4%.

Racial composition as of the 2020 census
Race	Number	Percent
White	2,582	81.5%
Black or African American	31	1.0%
American Indian and Alaska Native	319	10.1%
Asian	36	1.1%
Native Hawaiian and Other Pacific Islander	1	0.0%
Some other race	28	0.9%
Two or more races	172	5.4%
Hispanic or Latino (of any race)	144	4.5%

=== 2010 census ===
At the 2010 census there were 3,376 people in 1,245 households, including 717 families, in the city. The population density was 559.9 inhabitants per square mile (216.2/km^{2}). There were 1,371 housing units at an average density of 227.4 per square mile (87.8/km^{2}). The racial makeup of the city was 89.5% White, 0.8% African American, 6.5% Native American, 0.5% Asian, 0.8% from other races, and 1.9% from two or more races. Hispanic or Latino people of any race were 3.0%.

Of the 1,245 households 28.3% had children under the age of 18 living with them, 43.8% were married couples living together, 9.2% had a female householder with no husband present, 4.7% had a male householder with no wife present, and 42.4% were non-families. 37.4% of households were one person and 14% were one person aged 65 or older. The average household size was 2.17 and the average family size was 2.84.

The median age was 40.3 years. 18.9% of residents were under the age of 18; 8.3% were between the ages of 18 and 24; 29.3% were from 25 to 44; 29.9% were from 45 to 64; and 13.6% were 65 or older. The gender makeup of the city was 58.3% male and 41.7% female.

=== 2000 census ===
At the 2000 census there were 3,216 people in 1,196 households, including 735 families, in the City of Shelby. The population density was 1,018.8 inhabitants per square mile (393.4/km^{2}). There were 1,349 housing units at an average density of 427.3 per square mile (165.0/km^{2}). The racial makeup of the city was 92.48% White, 0.25% African American, 4.17% Native American, 0.40% Asian, 0.25% from other races, and 2.46% from two or more races. Hispanic or Latino people of any race were 1.24%.

Of the 1,196 households 30.9% had children under 18 living with them, 50.8% were married couples living together, 7.5% had a female householder with no husband present, and 38.5% were non-families. 35.5% of households were one person and 16.1% were one person aged 65 or older. The average household size was 2.34 and the average family size was 3.07.

The age distribution was 24.0% under the age of 18, 7.2% from 18 to 24, 29.5% from 25 to 44, 22.9% from 45 to 64, and 16.4% 65 or older. The median age was 39 years. For every 100 females there were 107.4 males. For every 100 females age 18 and over, there were 108.9 males.

The median household income was $29,219 and the median family income was $41,046. Males had a median income of $27,634 versus $19,444 for females. The per capita income for the city was $15,071. About 6.1% of families and 8.6% of the population were below the poverty line, including 8.8% of those under age 18 and 7.5% of those age 65 or over.

== Arts and culture ==
The Marias Museum of History and Art is located in a historic home. In addition to exhibits about local history, agriculture, and Native American heritage, there are immersive themed rooms such as a doctor office, homestead kitchen, and working blacksmith shop.

The town has numerous parks with play equipment and picnic areas. Aronow Park has an ice skating rink, Johnson Memorial Park has an indoor swimming pool and splash pad, and Krysko Park/Meadowlark Park has multiple skate bowls.

Champions Park has an outdoor interpretive museum. It includes information on the World Heavyweight Championship Fight and local history.

Lake Shel-oole Campground connects to the Roadrunner Recreation Trail and fishing access on the lake. There is also a dog park.

Shelby has a civic center that includes a basketball court, two racquetball courts, and a weight room. They also have social events. Toole County Library is a public library in Shelby.

== Government ==
Shelby has a mayor and city council. There are three wards, each with two council members. Eric Tokerud ran unopposed for mayor in November 2025. He replaced Gary McDermott.

== Education ==
Shelby Public Schools educates students from kindergarten through 12th grade. In the 2021–2022 school year, Shelby High School had 112 students enrolled. In 2024-2025 there were 143. The school's team name is the Coyotes.

== Media ==
The Shelby Promoter is the newspaper for Shelby. It is printed weekly and also offers an e-edition.

Two radio stations are licensed in Shelby. KSEN AM 1150 and KZIN-FM 96.7 are both owned by Townsquare Media.

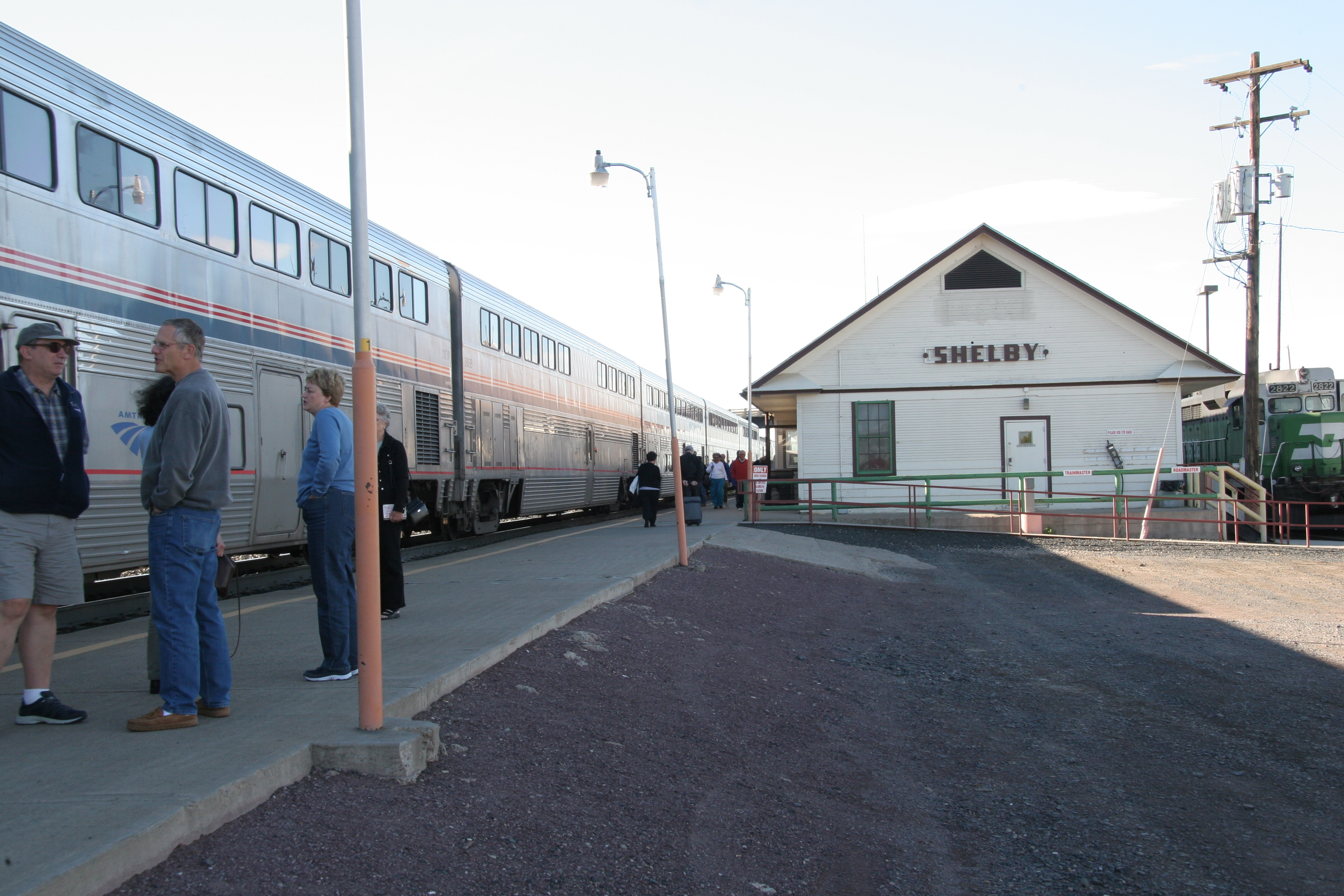
Shelby's Amtrak station

== Infrastructure ==
At Shelby station, Amtrak, the national passenger rail system, provides daily service to Shelby (both east and west), operating its Empire Builder from Chicago to Seattle and Portland, Oregon. The freight rail yard is known as the Port of Northern Montana.

Shelby is at the intersection of Interstate 15 and U.S. Route 2.

Northern Transit Interlocal] the local bus transportation system, provides transportation to Great Falls & Kalispell.

Shelby Airport is a county-owned airport two miles north of town. The nearest commercial airport is Great Falls International Airport, 86 miles (138 km) south.

== Notable people ==
- James Grady, author; born in and grew up in Shelby; was on the staff of Senator Lee Metcalf
- Leroy Hood, scientist associated with the Human Genome Project; grew up here
- Jack Horner, paleontologist; born here
- Larry Krystkowiak, former NBA player (1986–1996); grew up here
