= Ralph Budd =

American railroad executive (1879–1962)

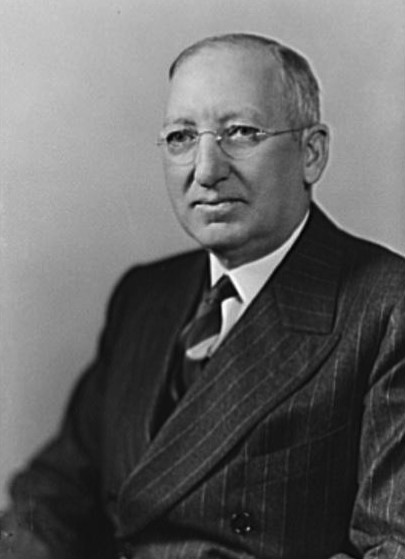
- Budd, c. 1945

President of the Great Northern Railway
- In office 1919 – January 1, 1932
- Succeeded by: William Patrick Kenney

Personal details
- Born: August 20, 1879 near Waterloo, Iowa, U.S.
- Died: February 2, 1962 (aged 82) Santa Barbara, California, U.S.
- Occupation: Railroad executive

Ralph Budd (August 20, 1879 – February 2, 1962) was an American railroad executive who was the president of the Great Northern Railway from 1919 up until 1932, when he served as president of the Chicago, Burlington and Quincy Railroad until his retirement in 1949.

== Early life ==
One of six children of John and Mary Budd, Ralph was born on a farm near Waterloo, Iowa, on August 20, 1879. After graduating at nineteen from Des Moines' Highland Park College, he began railway service as a draftsman in the Chicago Great Western’s divisional engineering office.

In 1902 Budd joined the Chicago, Rock Island and Pacific Railroad for the construction of its St. Louis-Kansas City line. It was on the Rock that Budd met one of the deans of American railroad civil engineering, John Frank Stevens. Stevens' was already well known for his location of the Great Northern Railway's line across Montana's Marias Pass, and would soon go on to plan the Panama Canal at the behest of Theodore Roosevelt. Budd followed Stevens to Panama, working on the engineering of the Panama Railway.

He followed Stevens again in 1910, this time to Oregon. There, Stevens was working for his old Great Northern boss, James J. Hill, on constructing the Oregon Trunk from the Pacific Northwest into northern California. This route, composed of the Spokane, Portland and Seattle, the Oregon Trunk Railway, the Western Pacific Railroad, and the Atchison, Topeka and Santa Fe, was finally pieced together in the 1930s. It gave the Hill Lines a route into the heart of California and became known as the "Inside Gateway." His work with Stevens brought Budd to the attention of Hill, who left confidential instructions that after his death, Budd should be appointed president of the Great Northern.

== Great Northern Railway ==
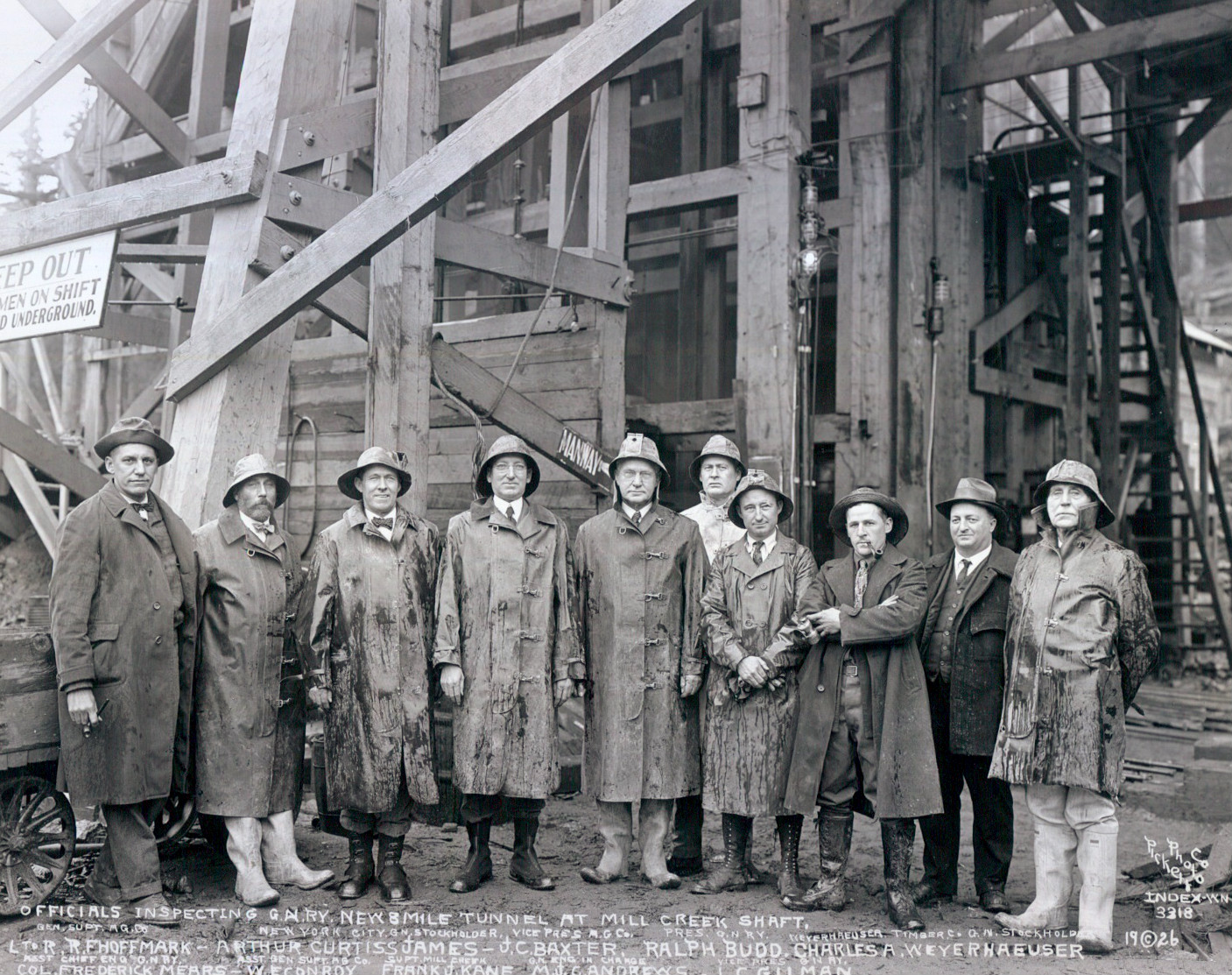
Budd is shown fourth from left in this 1926 photo at the Mill Creek shaft of the Cascade Tunnel

At the age of 40, in 1919, Budd became the youngest railroad president in America when he became president of the Great Northern Railway. Under his tenure at Great Northern, the railway built the Cascade Tunnel in Washington, a project that cost $25 million and eliminated an earlier summit tunnel under the Cascade Range and a rugged alignment through an avalanche-prone area. At 7.79 miles in length, the Great Northern's New Cascade Tunnel remains the longest railroad tunnel in the United States.

Over the course of thirteen years, Budd's administration invested $79,000,000 in improvements, $75,000,000 more in rolling stock, and nearly $7,000,000 in the construction of new lines.

In the 1920s, together with Howard Elliott of the Northern Pacific Railway, Budd began the third attempt to formally merge the Hill Lines. This was the first attempt since the disastrous Northern Securities Case of 1904. This ultimately resulted in failure, when the Interstate Commerce Commission agreed to the merger, but only if the Hill Lines let go of their vital link to Chicago—the Chicago, Burlington and Quincy Railroad.

== Burlington ==
At one of the lowest points in the Great Depression, January 1, 1932, Ralph Budd left the Great Northern to become president of the Burlington. While leading the Burlington, he met Edward G. Budd (distant relation), who had formed the Budd Company in 1912, and had recently begun to apply his automobile body construction knowledge to build railroad passenger equipment in a new venture using stainless steel. The Budd Company built the Pioneer Zephyr for Burlington, and the train's "dawn-to-dusk" run from Denver, Colorado, to Chicago, Illinois, on May 26, 1934, in an unprecedented thirteen hours and five minutes, helped usher in the railroad streamliner era. Both Ralph and Edward Budd, among other notable men including H. L. Hamilton, president of the Winton Motor Company which built the motor for the train, were passengers aboard the record-setting run; the train's speed averaged 77.1 miles per hour (124.1 km/h), reaching a top speed of 112.5 miles per hour (181 km/h). The name of the new train came from The Canterbury Tales, which Ralph Budd had been reading. The story begins with pilgrims setting out on a journey, inspired by the budding springtime and by Zephyrus, the gentle and nurturing west wind. Ralph Budd thought that would be an excellent name for a sleek new traveling machine: "Zephyr." In the summer of 1939 he persuaded the Denver and Rio Grande and the Western Pacific to join the Burlington in establishing a daily through train to the Pacific Coast; a decade later it was replaced by the fabled California Zephyr.

Budd also worked to complete the Dotsero Cut-Off, which opened in 1934, and led to fourfold increase of Burlington business through Denver.

In 1939, Budd was awarded the George R. Henderson Medal.

By 1945, Budd had become intrigued with Electro-Motive Diesel’s Cyrus R. Osborne’s idea of a dome passenger car, and built the first experimental one in the Burlington's Aurora Shops.

In 1940 and again in 1949, Budd sponsored two historical pageants on the Burlington and was one of the moving spirits behind the successful Railroad Fair held on Chicago’s lakefront in 1948-49.

Burlington historian Richard C. Overton wrote: "The Burlington, with Budd in command, was virtually a training school for railway executives. Men like Fred Gurley, John Farrington, Fred Whitman, Harry Murphy, and [Alfred] E. Perlman, all of whom went on to head great railways, served varying terms on the Burlington while Budd was at its head. As James G. Lyne put it in Railway Age at the time of his retirement in 1949, the Burlington was 'principally the lengthened shadow of Ralph Budd.'"

== Later life and death ==
After retirement, Budd spent five years as chairman of the Chicago Transit Authority. He arranged the donation of the Burlington's corporate records to the Newberry Library. Though he supported many publication which chronicled the history of the Burlington, Budd himself turned down a professorship at Northwestern University, claiming his lack of qualifications. In 1949, he founded The Lexington Group in Transportation History, which holds annual meetings to this day.

Ralph Budd retired to Santa Barbara, California, in 1954, and died on February 2, 1962.

== Legacy ==
His son, John Marshall Budd, also became president of the Great Northern Railway, and together with Robert Stetson Macfarlane of the Northern Pacific Railway, worked from 1955 until 1970 to merge the Hill Lines into the Burlington Northern Railroad (today's BNSF Railway).

The name Ralph Budd was also applied to a commercial steamship that plied the Great Lakes in the 1920s and 1930s. On May 15, 1929, the boat ran aground in Eagle Harbor, Michigan, during a fierce winter storm. The crew escaped in lifeboats, and the ship was later repaired and returned to service.

Ralph Budd was 1935 Commencement speaker at Rice University and donated his honorarium to Rice for the benefit of students as Ralph Budd Thesis award. The award is given annually to the graduate student judged to have the best doctoral thesis in the George R. Brown School of Engineering. This award was established in June, 1935, and is one of the oldest and most prestigious awards for graduate students at Rice University.

Control Point "Budd" (a double track crossover on the BNSF Railway's mainline along the Mississippi River) is named after Ralph Budd. The crossover is located just south of East Dubuque, Illinois.

== See also ==
- List of railroad executives
