= William Kenney =

William Kenney may refer to:

- William Kenney (bishop) (born 1946), English Roman Catholic bishop
- William Kenney (business executive) (1870–1939), American business executive
