= Glacier Park Limited =

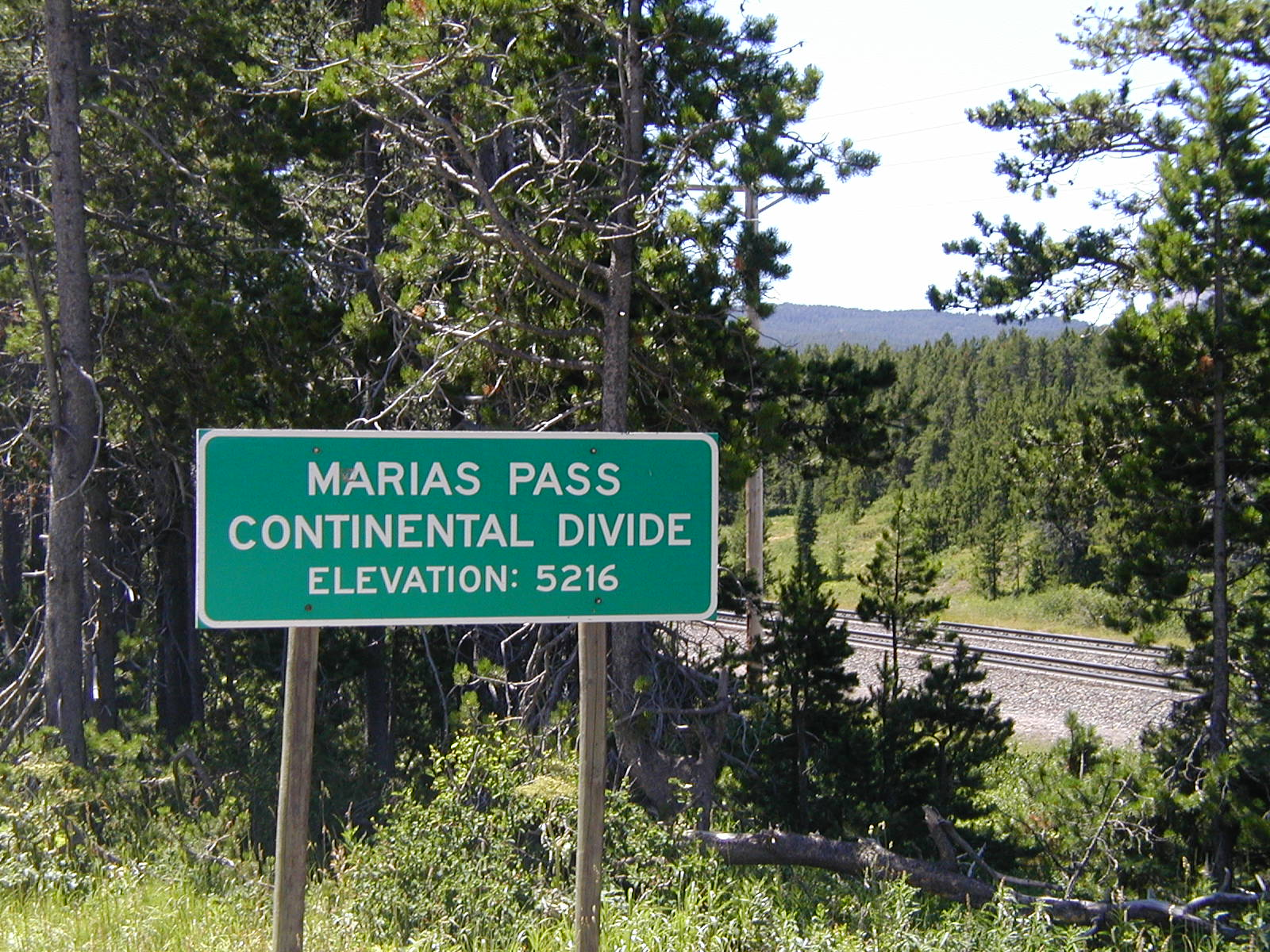
- Marias Pass, where the Glacier Park Limited ran

Overview
- Service type: Passenger
- Status: Defunct
- First service: April 25, 1915
- Last service: May 31, 1929
- Successor: Western Star; Empire Builder
- Former operator: Great Northern Railway

Route
- Termini: St. Paul; Seattle
- Train numbers: 3 & 4
- Line used: Northern Transcon

Technical
- Track gauge: Standard Gauge

The Glacier Park Limited was a named passenger train operated by the Great Northern Railway in the United States that ran between St. Paul and Seattle between 1915 and 1929. The Glacier Park Limited came to be when another one of Great Northern's St. Paul to Seattle routes, The Oregonian was renamed. The Limited also had a split with a small consist going to Portland along the route of the Spokane, Portland and Seattle Railway. The train was meant to promote Great Northern's on-line scenic attraction Glacier Park as a tourist destination, advertising the park's unequaled scenery and easy access by its trains, which stopped on both the Eastern and Western edge of the park.

== Route ==
The route taken by the Glacier Park Limited was similar to that of most of Great Northern's Oriental Limited, running from St. Paul to Seattle. The Westbound Glacier Park Limited started in St. Paul, before passing through Willmar, Fargo, New Rockford, Minot, Havre, Whitefish, Spokane, and Cascade Tunnel before ending in Seattle. Eastbound, the limited started in Seattle, and passed through Spokane, Whitefish, Havre, Minot, Devils Lake, Grand Forks, and St. Cloud before reaching St. Paul.

== Longevity ==
The Glacier Park Limited operated from April 25, 1915, until May 31, 1929, when the Empire Builder's creation just a few weeks later made 3 trains along the same route redundant. During World War I, with American railroads controlled by the United States Railroad Administration, the Limited did not operate west of Havre from May 26, 1918, until May 30, 1920, a few months after the USRA relinquished control of the railroads back to their companies. The Oriental Limited took over the Glacier Park Limited's train numbers of 3 & 4 on the GN timetable once the Empire Builder took train numbers 1 & 2.

== Equipment ==
Despite not being the flagship train of the Great Northern, The Glacier Park Limited still enjoyed luxuries seen on The Oriental Limited and later The Empire Builder, including Observation Cars to see the scenery, especially in the Rockies and Cascades. The Limited was pulled by some of the best Locomotives the Great Northern had to offer, including E-14s and H-4 Pacifics. Near the end of the train's lifecycle P-2 locomotives pulled the train. GN used their electric locomotives to pull the train through both the old Cascade Tunnel as well as the current tunnel.
