= Great Northern 1355 =

Preserved 4-6-2 Pacific locomotive

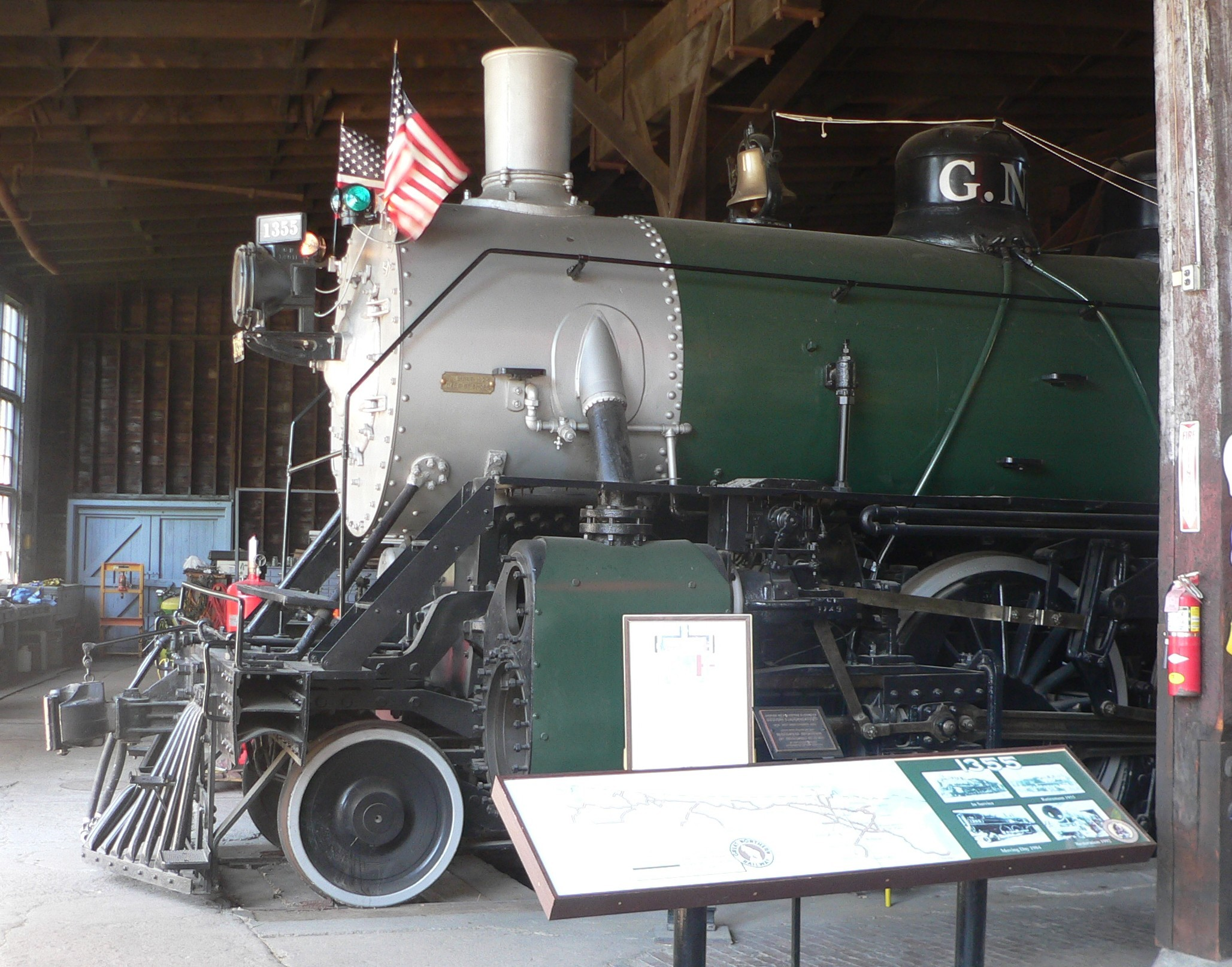
- GN1355, displayed at Milwaukee Railroad Shop in Sioux City, Iowa
Type and origin
- Power type: Steam
- Builder: Baldwin Locomotive Works
- Serial number: 33908
- Build date: October 16, 1909
- Rebuild date: May 29, 1924
Specifications
- Configuration
  - Whyte: New: 4-6-0; Now: 4-6-2
- Gauge: 1,435 mm (4 ft 8 1/2 in)
- Leading dia.: 36 in (914 mm)
- Driver dia.: 73 in (1,854 mm)
- Trailing dia.: 45 in (1,143 mm)
- Axle load: 58,666 lb (26,610 kilograms; 26.610 metric tons)
- Adhesive weight: 164,000 lb (74 t)
- Loco weight: 271,800 lb (123 t)
- Tender weight: 188,400 lb (85 t)
- Total weight: 460,200 lb (209 t)
- Fuel type: New: Coal; Now: Oil
- Boiler pressure: 200 psi (1 MPa)
- Cylinders: Two, outside
- Cylinder size: 23.5 in × 30 in (597 mm × 762 mm)
- Valve gear: Walschaerts
- Valve type: Piston valves
- Loco brake: Air
- Train brakes: Air
- Couplers: Knuckle
Performance figures
- Tractive effort: 38,500 lbf (171 kN)
- Factor of adh.: 4.26
Career
- Operators: Great Northern Railway
- Class: New: E-14; Now: H-5
- Number in class: 25
- Numbers: GN 1020; GN 1494; GN 1355
- Delivered: October 16, 1909
- First run: November 19, 1909
- Last run: 1954
- Retired: 1955
- Preserved: July 1955
- Restored: 2024 - ongoing
- Current owner: City of Sioux City, Iowa
- Disposition: Undergoing restoration to operating condition
- Great Northern Railway Steam Locomotive No. 1355 and Tender 1451
- U.S. National Register of Historic Places
- Location within Iowa Location within the United States
- Location: 3400 Sioux River Rd., Sioux City, Iowa
- Coordinates: 42°31′45″N 96°28′36″W
- NRHP reference No.: 04001352
- Added to NRHP: December 15, 2004

Great Northern 1355 is a H-5 class 4-6-2 "Pacific" type steam locomotive, built by Baldwin Locomotive Works in October 1909 for the Great Northern Railway in the United States. It was originally built as a 4-6-0 "Ten-wheeler" type locomotive, but it had an extensive rebuild in 1924 when it became a 4-6-2, Pacific, type. During its career, it pulled both freight and passenger trains, including the Great Northern's crack Empire Builder and Oriental Limited.

It was built as one of 25 class E14 Ten-wheelers and passed its inspections at the GN's Dale Street Shops in St. Paul, Minnesota on November 19, 1909. It spent its first ten years near Hillyard, Washington and then in 1919, was sent to Spokane, both in passenger service.

On February 19, 1924, it returned to the Dale Street Shops for a major rebuild. It's not clear whether this was actually a rebuild or virtually a new engine. New parts included a Belpaire firebox, longer boiler, type A superheater, new solid leading wheels, a Delta trailing truck which made it a 4-6-2, new brakes, and one of its four conversions between oil and coal fuel. It left the shop on May 29 and was sent to the Willmar, Minnesota division for passenger work, reclassified as a class H-5.

The following January, it was back in the shop to receive a booster engine on its trailing truck. This was removed in 1929. It was renumbered again, to 1355, in April 1926 and converted from coal to oil. It was then dispatched to the Butte, Montana division, where it principally handled the Oriental Limited. It spent the last two years of its working life, 1953–55, hauling iron ore on the Mesabi Range until its retirement in 1955.

In late 1954, the city of Sioux City, Iowa asked the Great Northern for a steam locomotive. Sioux City was at very southern end of the GN's operations and in July 55, it was delivered to the city. In 1995, the locomotive was moved to the former Milwaukee Road Shops and Roundhouse, where it has undergone extensive cosmetic restoration.

It was added to the National Register of Historic Places in 2004 as Great Northern Railway Steam Locomotive No. 1355 and Tender 1451.

In July 2024, work has begun to restore No. 1355 to operating condition.
