= Baldwin RS-4-TC =

Diesel-electric locomotive

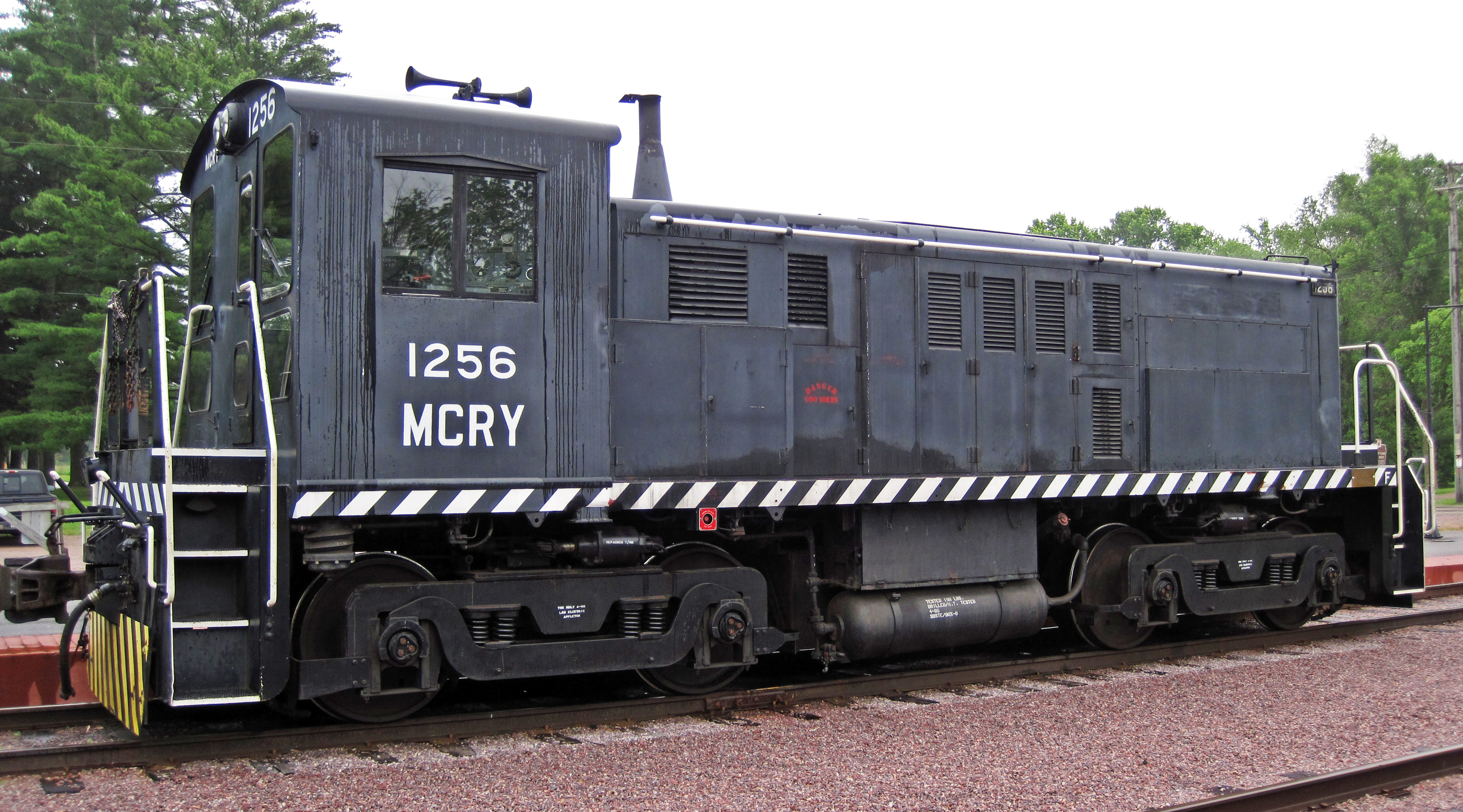
- A preserved RS-4-TC operated by the Mid-Continent Railway Museum in North Freedom, Wisconsin on June 13, 2015
Type and origin
- Power type: Diesel-electric
- Builder: Baldwin-Lima-Hamilton
- Model: RS-4-TC
- Build date: July 1953 – January 1955
- Total produced: 74
Specifications
- Configuration
  - AAR: B-B
- Gauge: 4 ft 8 1/2 in (1,435 mm)
- Length: 38 ft 11 in (11.86 m)
- Height: 12 ft 6.5 in (3.82 m)
- Loco weight: 60 short tons (54 long tons; 54 t)
- Prime mover: Caterpillar D397
- Engine type: Four-stroke diesel
- Aspiration: Supercharged
- Generator: DC generator
- Traction motors: DC traction motors
- Cylinders: V-12
- Cylinder size: 5 3/4 in × 8 in (146.1 mm × 203.2 mm)
- Transmission: Electric
- Loco brake: Straight air
- Train brakes: Air
Performance figures
- Power output: 400 hp (300 kW)
Career
- Locale: North America

The Baldwin RS-4-TC is a diesel-electric switcher locomotive built by the Baldwin-Lima-Hamilton Corporation between July 1953 and January 1955. The RS-4-TCs were powered by a supercharged twelve-cylinder diesel engine rated at 400 horsepower (298 kW), and rode on a pair of two-axle trucks in a B-B wheel arrangement. 74 of these models were built mainly for the Army while a few of them went to the Air Force.

== History ==
Operator's manual for the 1A variant.

The RS-4-TCs were originally built with Caterpillar D397 diesel engines. The Caterpillar D397s were chosen for their high speed and small bore and stroke for quick startup and shutdowns. There are two number systems for the RS-4-TCs, the 1200 series or the 4000 series. The locomotives in both series were the same, except the 1200s were built for domestic service and had fixed axle, standard gauge trucks while the 4000s were built for foreign service and had adjustable-gauge trucks for use on foreign narrow and wide gauge tracks. Even though the 4000s were built for foreign service, very few were actually deployed overseas, the vast majority served in the United States.

At the end of the Korean War, most RS-4-TCs were placed into storage while their World War II counterparts were sold as surplus. Today, the majority of RS-4-TCs have been sold as surplus and are currently serving tourist and shortline railroads with a few still in military service.

In the 1980s, many RS-4-TCs were rebuilt by railroad contractors into RS-4-TC 1A locomotives. The rebuilding included replacing the CAT D397 diesel engines with CAT 3508 engines rated at 500 HP, replacing the adjustable-gauge trucks with non adjustable trucks, and replacing the electrical control system with an EMD system and control stand. These are identifiable from the exterior by a single exhaust stack near the rear of the hood rather than two small stacks towards the front.

== Technical details ==
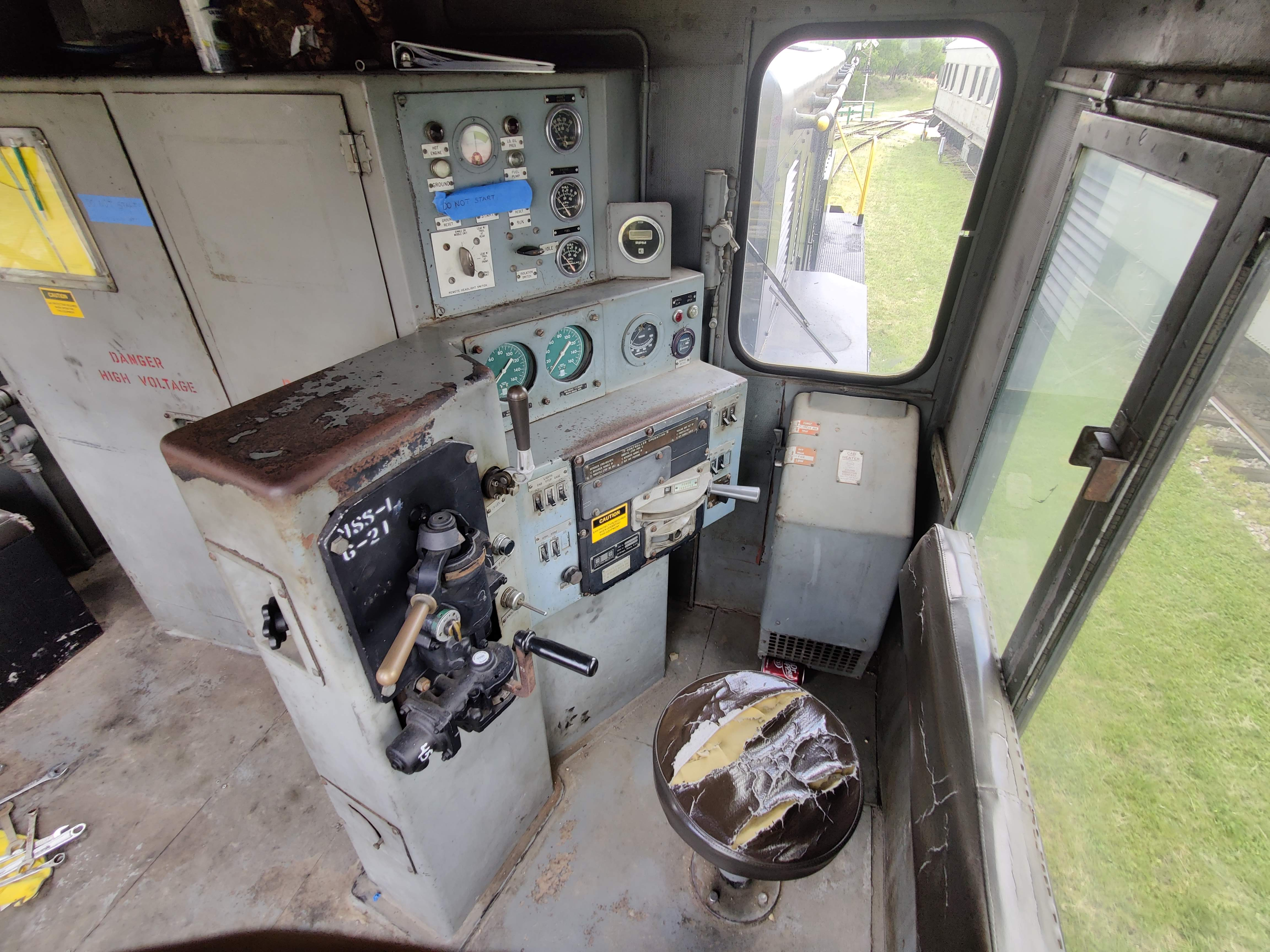
1954 Baldwin RS-4-TC-A1 4035 control stand at the Texas transportation museum

The diesel engine is a twelve-cylinder, turbocharged, water-cooled, four-cycle, V-type engine used to provide power. It is directly connected to the main generator. The traction motors are axle hung and supported on the truck transoms by spring-loaded suspension. One motor is geared to each axle through a single set of gears with a ratio of 14:72. The radiator keeps the engine at a proper operating temperature between 100 and 198F (37.7 and 92.2 °C). Two externally mounted battery boxes, one on each side of the locomotive, provide ventilated compartments to house the eight batteries. Two main reservoir tanks, one on each side of the locomotive, provide a means of storing air for the air system. The main generator furnishes direct-current power over a wide range of voltage at various speeds up to 1200 rpm. It is separately excited by the exciter generator mounted on the generator frame. The generator also acts as a starting motor when the start button is pushed and the battery switch is closed. The fuel tank can hold 500 U.S. gallons (1,900 liters) of diesel fuel for engine operation. Two fill pipes and two sight glasses, one on each side of the locomotive, provide a means of filling the tank and monitoring the level of fuel. The blower provides forced ventilation for the traction motors which require adequate cooling. It is belt-driven from the main generator shaft.

The master controller contains the throttle, reverser, brake controls, and other controls and indicators used by operator to operate and monitor the locomotive and is located in the cab of the locomotive. The equipment cabinet contains the automatic switching relays and contactors and is located in the cab of the locomotive. Both high and low voltage are present in the electrical equipment cabinet when the locomotive is in operation.

== Name designation ==
RS - Road Switching Service
4 - 4th military type
TC - Transportation Corps (as in Army Transportation Corps)

== Original buyers ==
Image	Railroad	Quantity	Road numbers	Notes
	U.S. Army	66	1247-1273, 4001-4039	
	U.S. Air Force	8	1274-1276, 4040-4044	
	Totals	74		

== Preservation ==
• US Army #1249 and US Air Force #1276 are preserved at the South Carolina Railroad Museum in Winnsboro, South Carolina.

• US Army #1256 is preserved at the Mid-Continent Railway Museum in North Freedom Wisconsin

• US Army #4012 and #4024 are preserved at the Northwest Railway Museum in Snoqualmie, Washington.

• US Army #4005 is preserved at the Hocking Valley Scenic Railway in Nelsonville, Ohio.

• US Army #4035 is preserved at the Texas Transportation Museum in San Antonio, Texas.

• US Air Force #4040 is preserved at the Michigan Transit Museum in Mount. Clemens, Michigan.

== Gallery ==
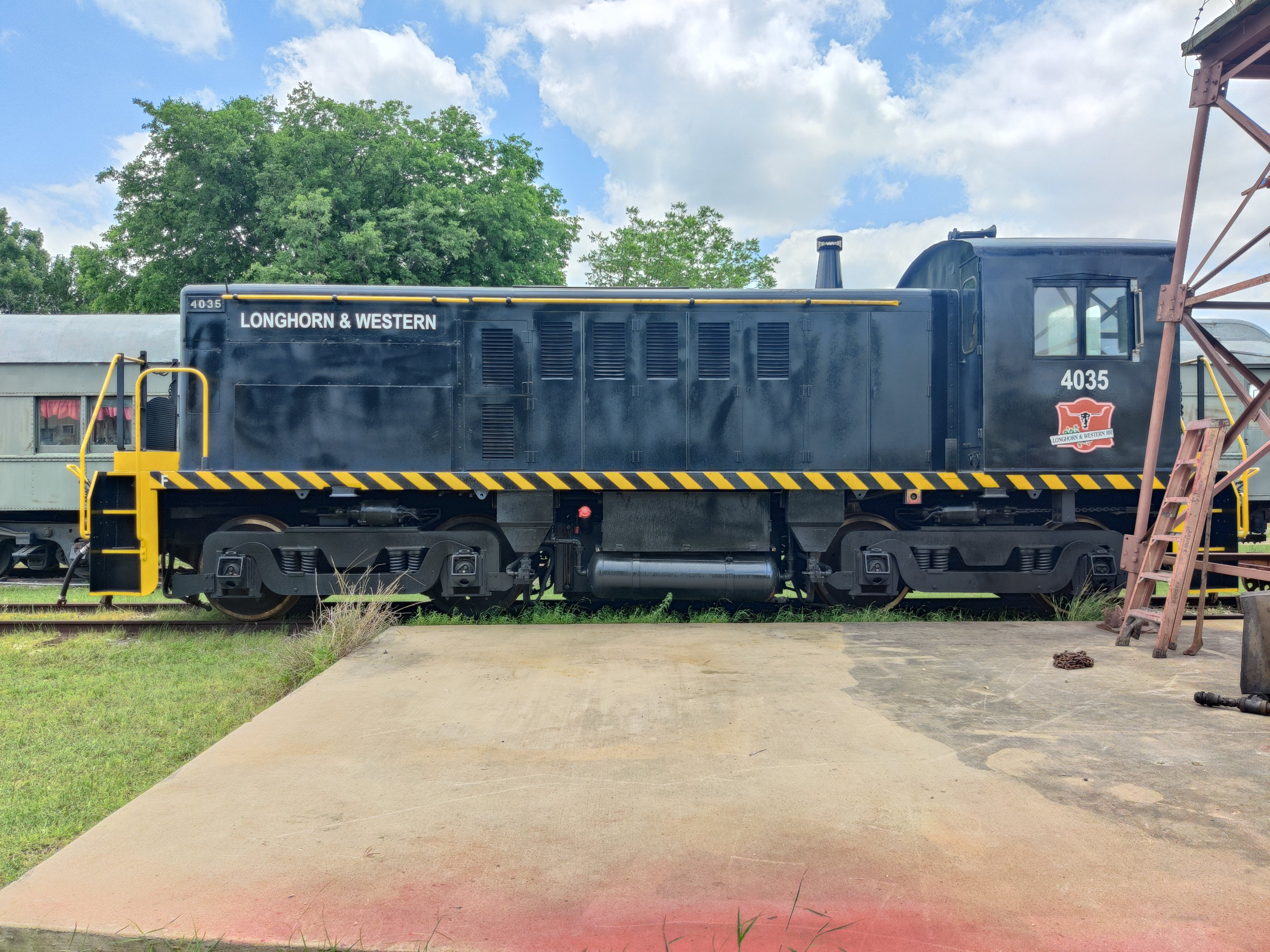
1954 Baldwin 0-4-4-0 Diesel-Electric Switcher model RS-4-TC 1A at the Texas Transportation Museum as of 2023

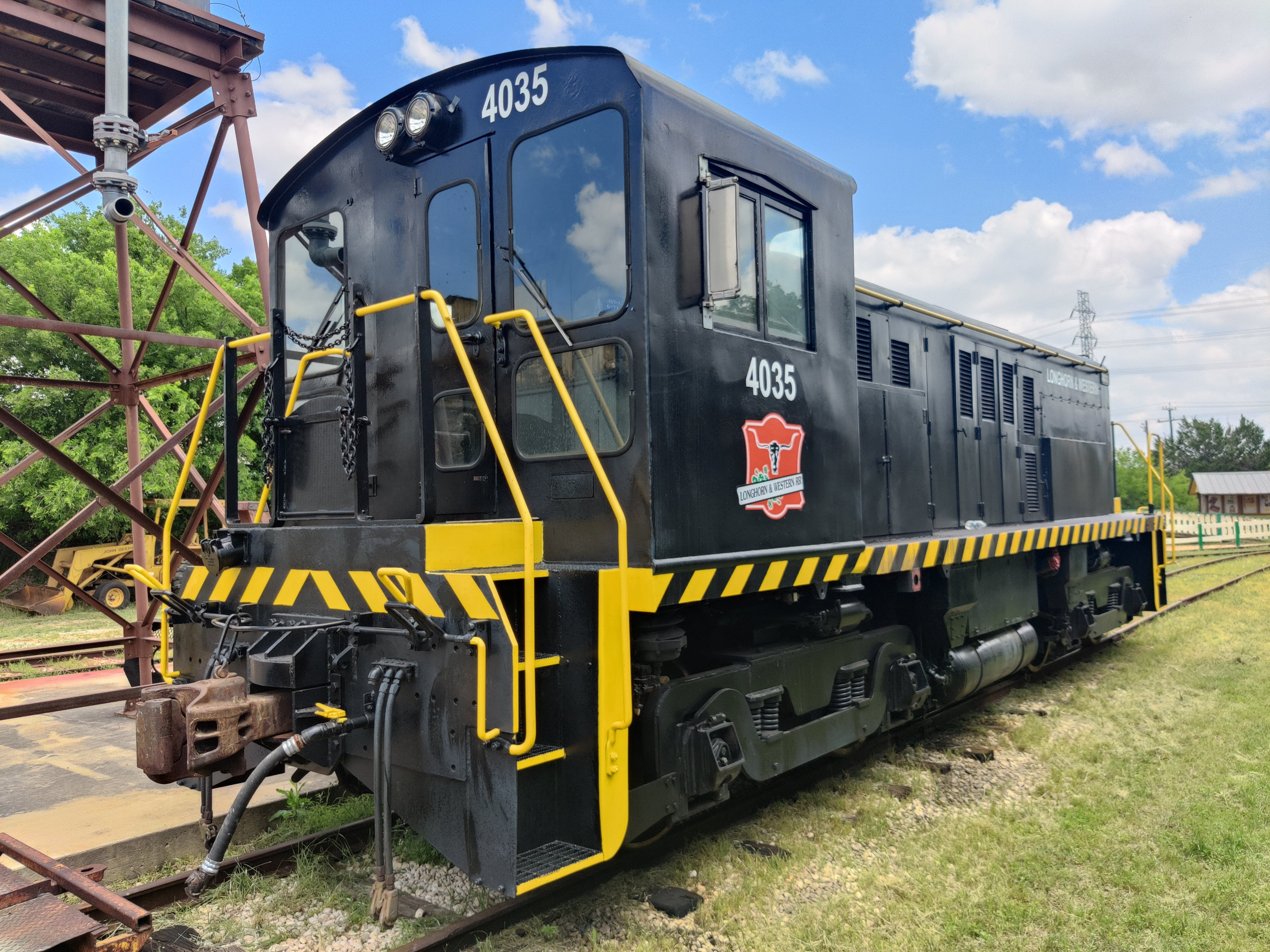
1954 Baldwin 0-4-4-0 Diesel-Electric Switcher model RS-4-TC 1A at the Texas Transportation Museum as of 2023

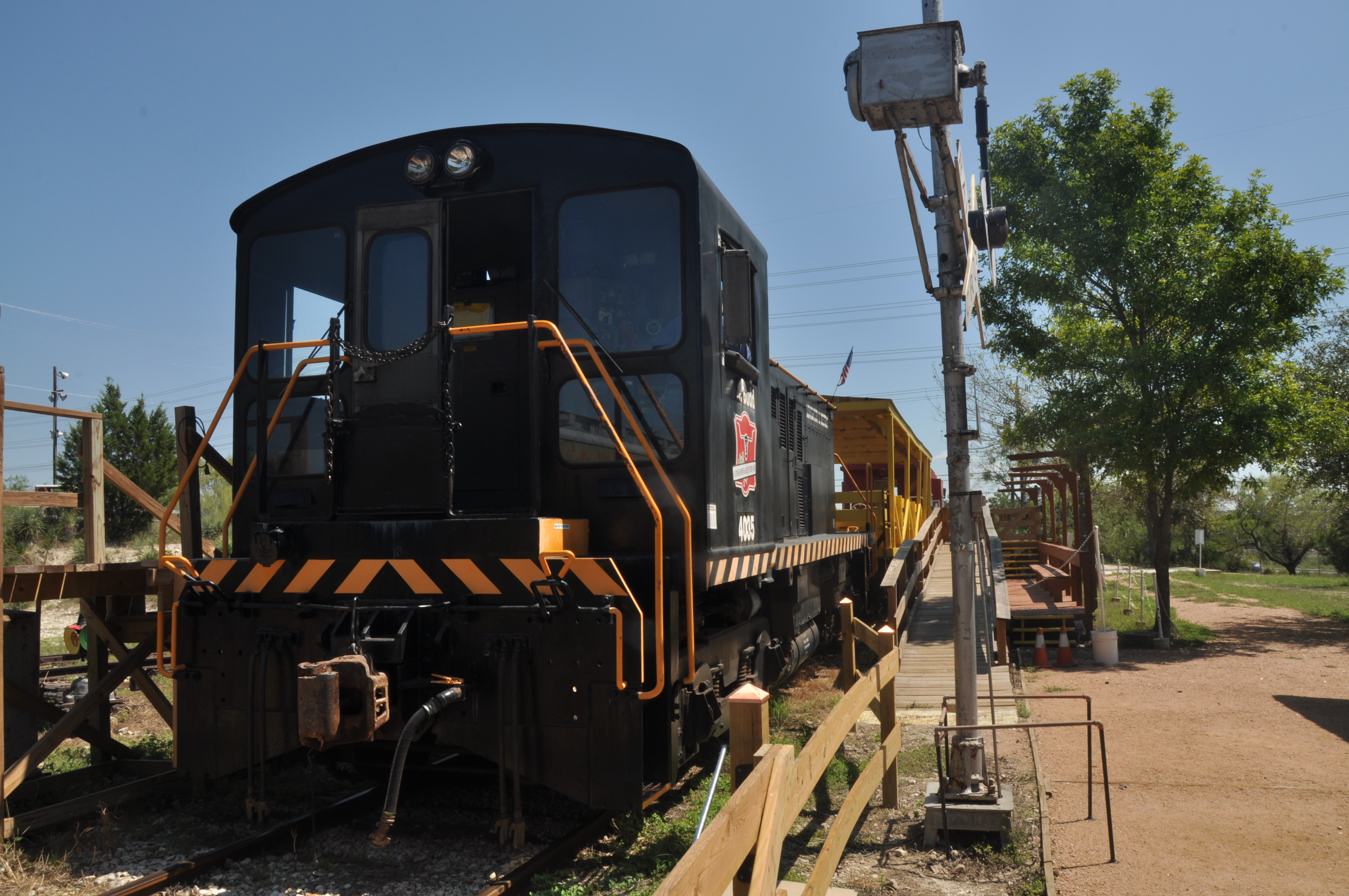
1954 Baldwin 0-4-4-0 Diesel-Electric Switcher model RS-4-TC 1A at the Texas Transportation Museum

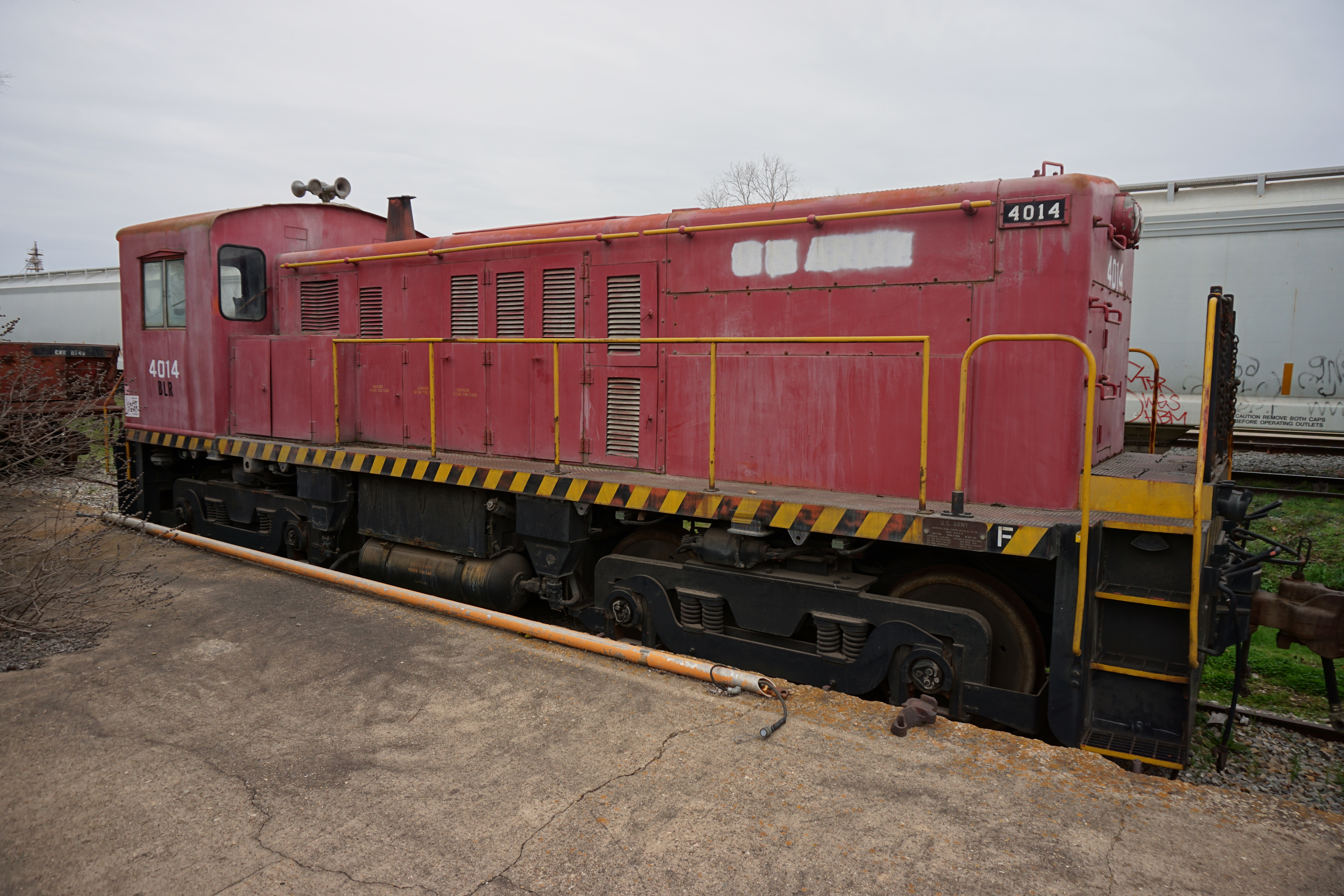
Blacklands Railroad RS-4-TC #4014 in Sulphur Springs, Texas
