= Great Northern Railway (U.S.) =

Defunct American Class I railroad

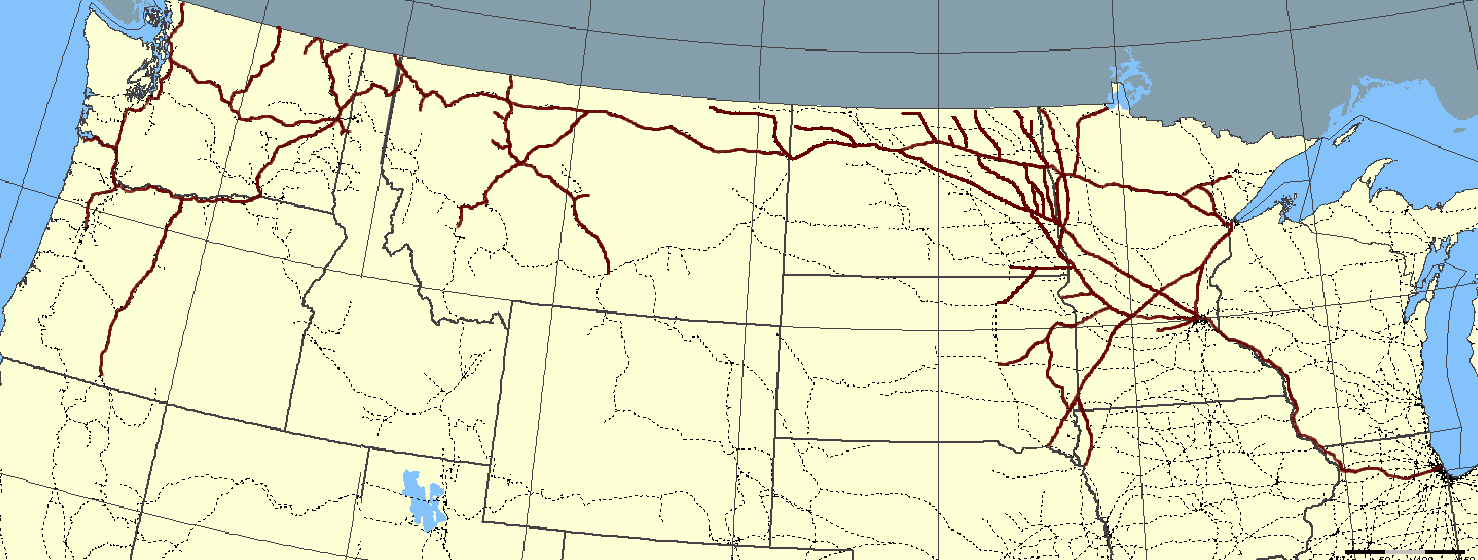
- GN system map, c. 1918; dotted lines represent nearby railroads.

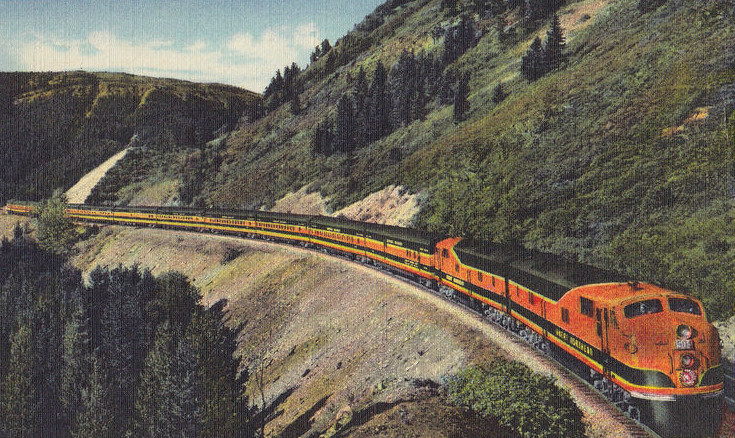
- The Empire Builder traveling through Glacier Park Montana. (1947)

Overview
- Headquarters: Railroad and Bank Building; Saint Paul, Minnesota
- Founders: James J. Hill; John S. Kennedy; Norman Kittson; Donald Smith; George Stephen
- Reporting mark: GN
- Locale: British Columbia; California; Idaho; Iowa; Manitoba; Minnesota; Montana; North Dakota; Oregon; South Dakota; Washington; Wisconsin
- Dates of operation: 1889–1970
- Successor: Burlington Northern Railroad

Technical
- Track gauge: 4 ft 8 1/2 in (1,435 mm)
- Length: 8,368 miles (13,467 km)

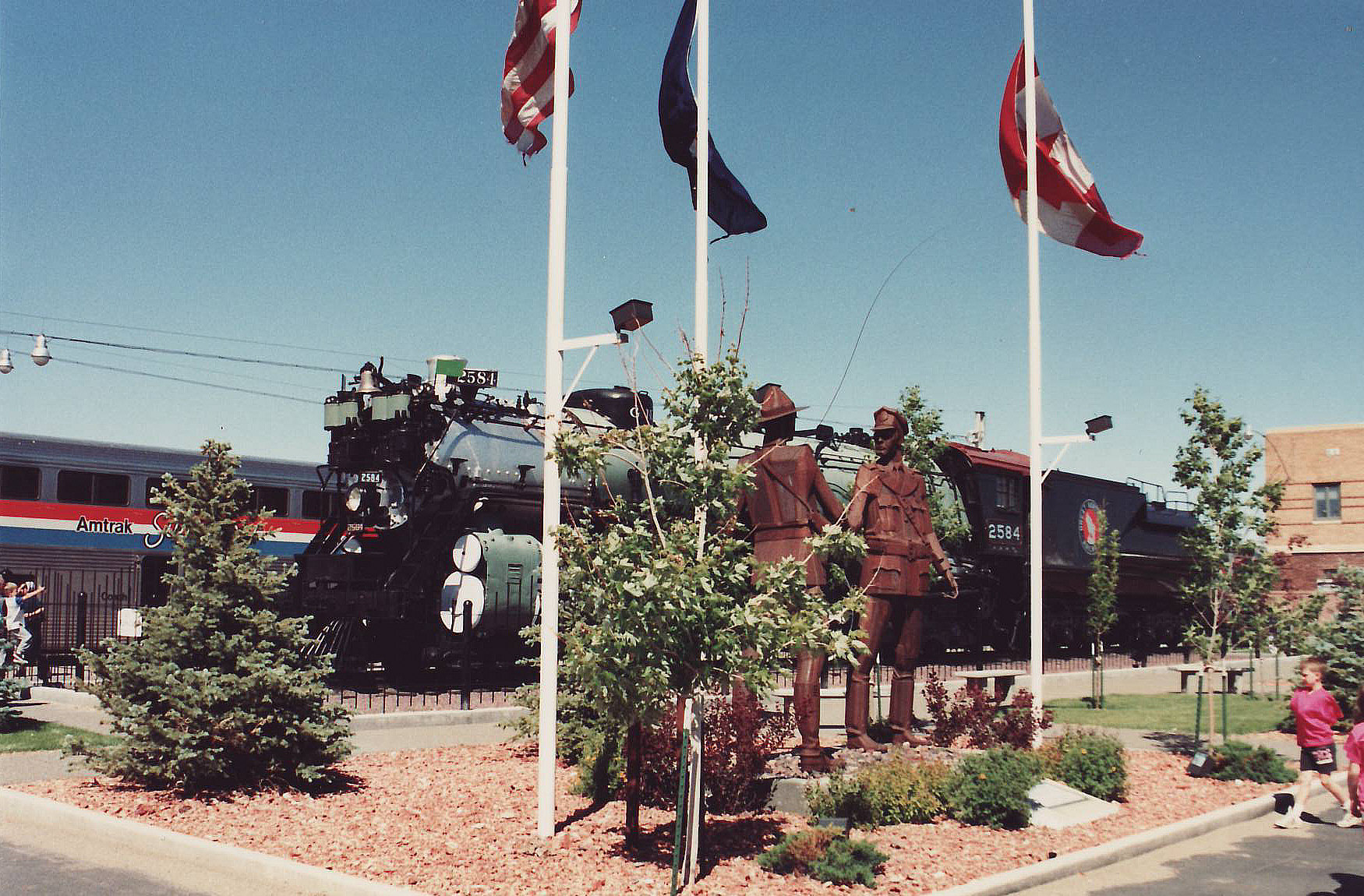
GN's 4-8-4 S-2 "Northern" class locomotive #2584 and nearby sculpture, U.S.–Canada Friendship in Havre, Montana

The Great Northern Railway (reporting mark GN) was an American Class I railroad. Running from Saint Paul, Minnesota, to Seattle, Washington, it was the creation of 19th-century Canadian–American railroad entrepreneur James J. Hill and was developed from the Saint Paul & Pacific Railroad. The Great Northern's route made it the northernmost transcontinental railroad in the U.S.

In 1970 the Great Northern Railway merged with three other railroads to form the Burlington Northern Railroad, which merged in 1996 with the Atchison, Topeka and Santa Fe Railway to form the Burlington Northern and Santa Fe Railway.

== History ==
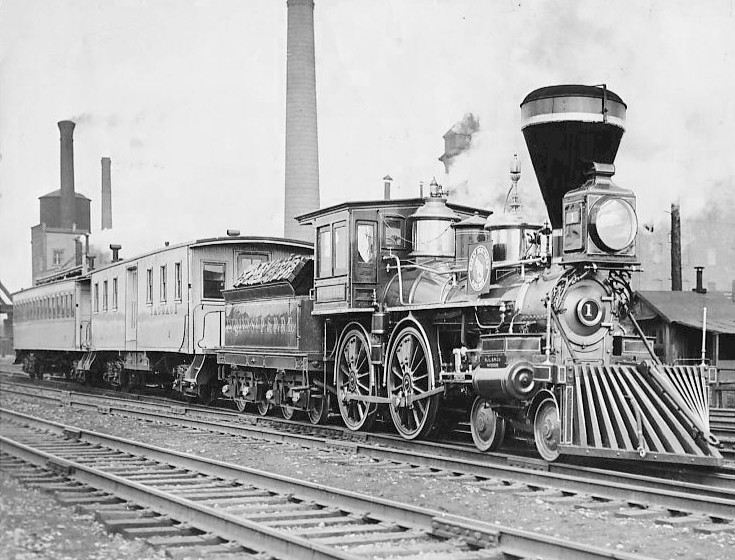
William Crooks in 1939 with the Great Northern logo above the drivers

Revenue freight traffic, in millions of net ton-miles (incl. FG&S; not incl. PC or MA&CR)
Year	Traffic
1925	8,521
1933	5,434
1944	19,583
1960	15,831
1967	17,938

The Great Northern was built in stages, slowly creating profitable lines, before extending the road further into undeveloped Western territories. In a series of the earliest public relations campaigns, contests were held to promote interest in the railroad and the ranchlands along its route. Fred J. Adams used promotional incentives such as feed and seed donations to farmers getting started along the line. Contests were all-inclusive, from the largest farm animals to the largest freight carload capacity, and were promoted heavily to immigrants and newcomers from the East.

The very first predecessor railroad to the company was the St. Paul and Pacific Railroad owned by William Crooks. He had gone bankrupt running a small line between St. Paul and Minneapolis. He named the locomotive he ran for himself and the William Crooks would be the first locomotive of the Great Northern Railway. J.J. Hill convinced New York banker John S. Kennedy, Norman Kittson (a wealthy fur trader friend), Donald Smith (a Hudson's Bay Company executive), George Stephen (Smith's cousin and president of the Bank of Montreal), and others to invest $5.5 million in purchasing the railroad. On March 13, 1878, the road's creditors formally signed an agreement transferring their bonds and control of the railroad to J.J. Hill's investment group. On September 18, 1889, Hill changed the name of the Minneapolis and St. Cloud Railway (a railroad which existed primarily on paper) to the Great Northern Railway. On February 1, 1890, he consolidated his ownership of the StPM&M, Montana Central Railway, and other rail lines to the Great Northern.

The Great Northern had branches that ran north to the Canada–US border in Minnesota, North Dakota, and Montana. It also had branches that ran to Superior, Wisconsin, and Butte, Montana, connecting with the iron range of Minnesota and copper mines of Montana. In 1898 Hill purchased control of large parts of the Mesabi Iron Range in Minnesota and its rail lines. The Great Northern began large-scale shipment of ore to the steel mills of the Midwest.

The railroad's best-known engineer was John Frank Stevens, who served from 1889 to 1903. Stevens was acclaimed for his 1889 exploration of Marias Pass in Montana and determined its practicability for a railroad. Stevens was an efficient administrator with remarkable technical skills and imagination. He discovered Stevens Pass through the Cascade Mountains, set railroad construction standards in the Mesabi Range, and supervised the construction of the Oregon Trunk Line. He then became the chief engineer of the Panama Canal.

The logo of the railroad, a Rocky Mountain goat, was based on a goat William Kenney, one of the railroad's presidents, had used to haul newspapers as a boy.

Locomotives and passenger cars were repaired and overhauled at the shops in St. Paul, Minnesota, while the shops at nearby St. Cloud were dedicated to freight cars beginning in 1890. In 1892, a new shop site was established five miles northeast of Spokane, Washington in Hillyard (named after James Hill) to serve the western half of the GN system.

=== Mainline ===
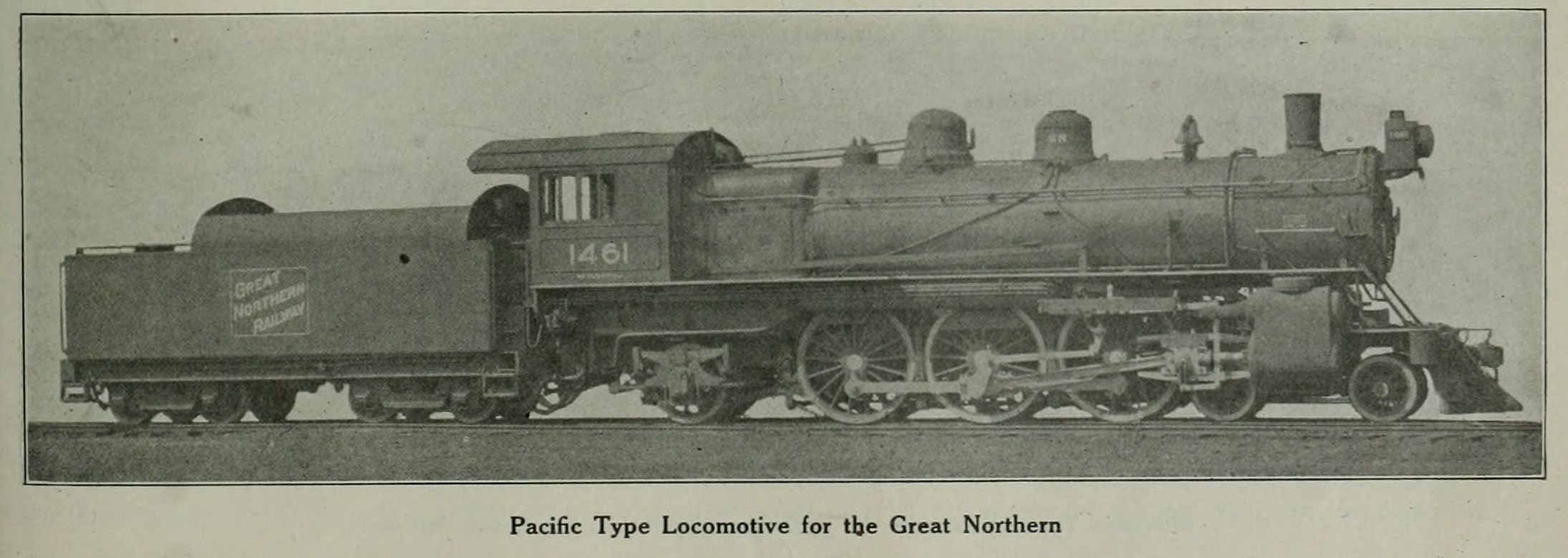
A Great Northern H class pacific with a Belpaire firebox. Belpaire fireboxes were rare in the US, but the Pennsylvania and Great Northern both had locomotives featuring them in significant numbers. They were mostly manufactured by or to Baldwin specifications. (1914)

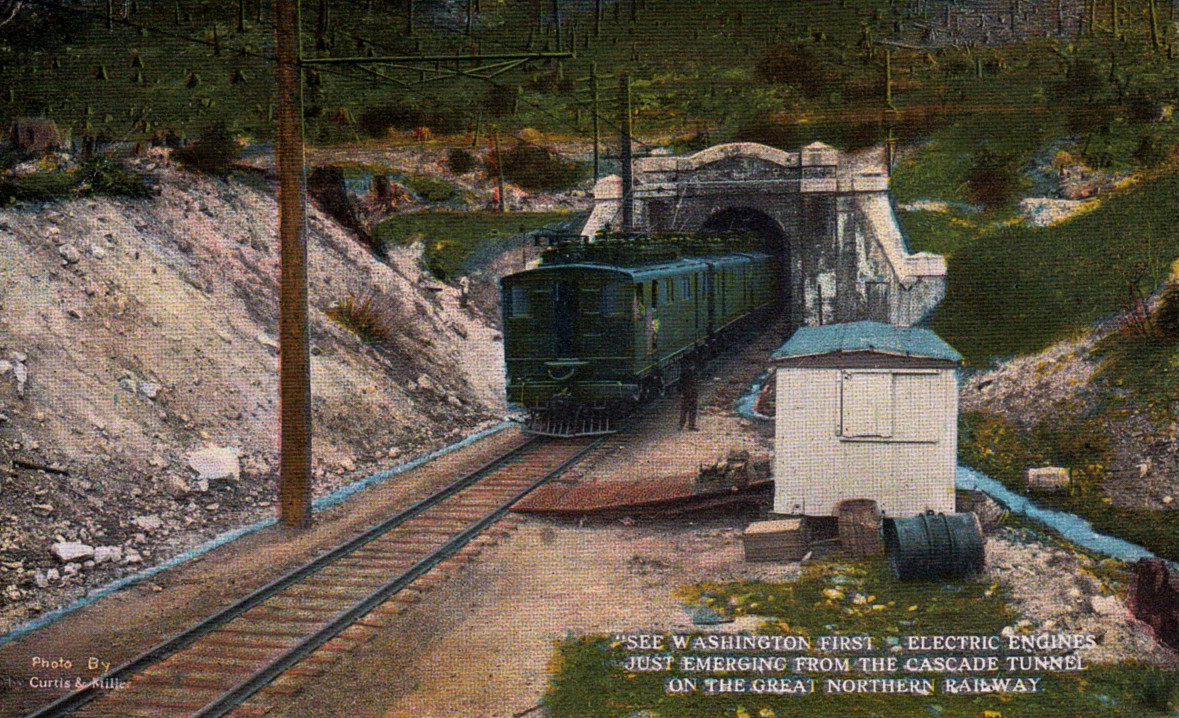
Great Northern boxcabs exiting the Cascade Tunnel.

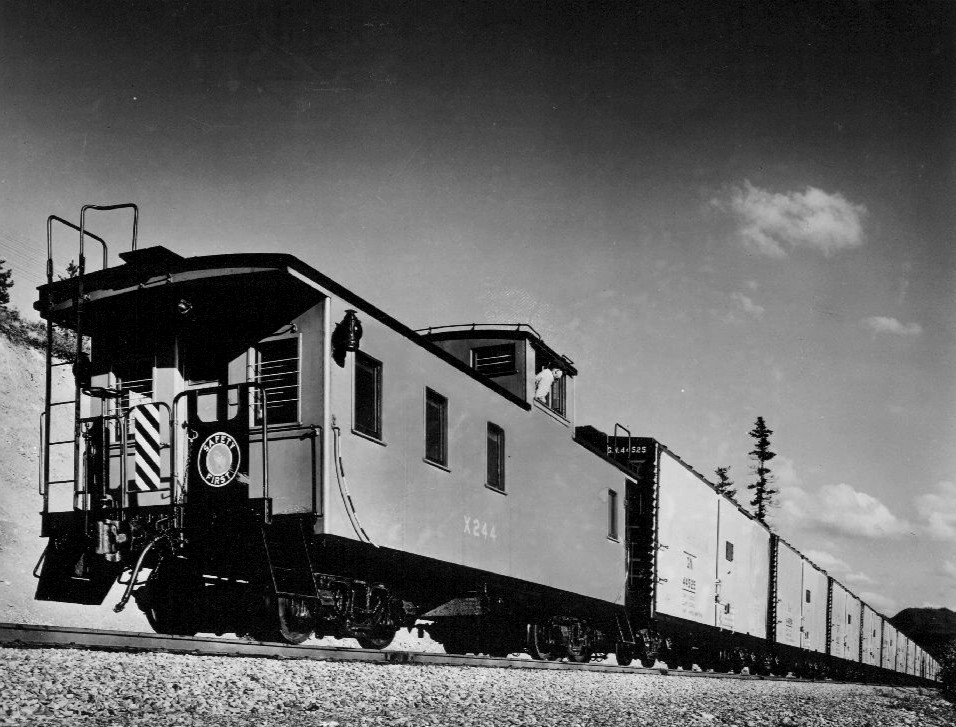
Great Northern brakeman checks train from caboose.

The mainline began at Saint Paul, Minnesota, heading west along the Mississippi River bluffs, crossing the river to Minneapolis on a massive multi-piered stone arch bridge just below the Saint Anthony Falls. The bridge ceased to be used as a railroad bridge in 1978, becoming a pedestrian river crossing with excellent views of the falls and of the lock system. The mainline headed northwest from the Twin Cities, across North Dakota and eastern Montana. The line then crossed the Rocky Mountains at Marias Pass. It then followed the Flathead River and then Kootenai River to Bonners Ferry, Idaho, south to Sandpoint, Idaho, west to Newport, Washington, and then to Spokane, Washington. The company town and extensive railroad facility of Hillyard, Washington was named after James J. Hill and briefly manufactured the R Class 2-8-8-2 around 1927 which was the largest steam locomotive in the world at the time. From there the mainline crossed the Cascade Mountains through the Cascade Tunnel under Stevens Pass, reaching Seattle, Washington, in 1893, with the driving of the last spike at Scenic, Washington, on January 6, 1893. The Great Northern electrified Steven's Pass and briefly owned the electric Spokane and Inland Empire Railway. The deadliest avalanche in US history swept two Great Northern trains off the tracks at Wellington, Washington by the Cascade Tunnel killing 96 people.

The mainline west of Marias Pass has been relocated twice. The original route over Haskell Pass, via Kalispell and Marion, Montana, was replaced in 1904 by a more circuitous but flatter route via Whitefish and Eureka, joining the Kootenai River at Rexford, Montana. A further reroute was necessitated by the construction of the Libby Dam on the Kootenai River in the late 1960s. The United States Army Corps of Engineers built a new route through the Salish Mountains, including the 7-mile-long (11 km) Flathead Tunnel, second-longest in the United States, to relocate the tracks away from the Kootenai River. This route opened in 1970. The surviving portions of the older routes (from Columbia Falls to Kalispell and Stryker to Eureka), were operated by Watco as the Mission Mountain Railroad until April 1, 2020, when BNSF (GN's modern successor) took back control of the Kalispell to Columbia Falls section.

The Great Northern mainline crossed the continental divide through Marias Pass, the lowest crossing of the Rockies south of the Canada–US border. Here, the mainline forms the southern border of Glacier National Park, which the GN promoted heavily as a tourist attraction. GN constructed stations at East Glacier and West Glacier entries to the park, stone and timber lodges at the entries, and other inns and lodges throughout the Park. Many of the structures have been listed on the National Register of Historic Places due to unique construction, location, and the beauty of the surrounding regions.

In 1931, the GN also developed the "Inside Gateway", a route to California that rivaled the Southern Pacific Railroad's route between Oregon and California. The GN route was further inland than the SP route and ran south from the Columbia River in Oregon. The GN connected with the Western Pacific at Bieber, California; the Western Pacific connected with the Atchison, Topeka, and Santa Fe in Stockton, California, and together the three railroads (GN, WP, and ATSF) competed with Southern Pacific for traffic between California and the Pacific Northwest. With a terminus at Superior, Wisconsin, the Great Northern was able to provide transportation from the Pacific to the Atlantic by taking advantage of the shorter distance to Duluth from the ocean, as compared to Chicago.

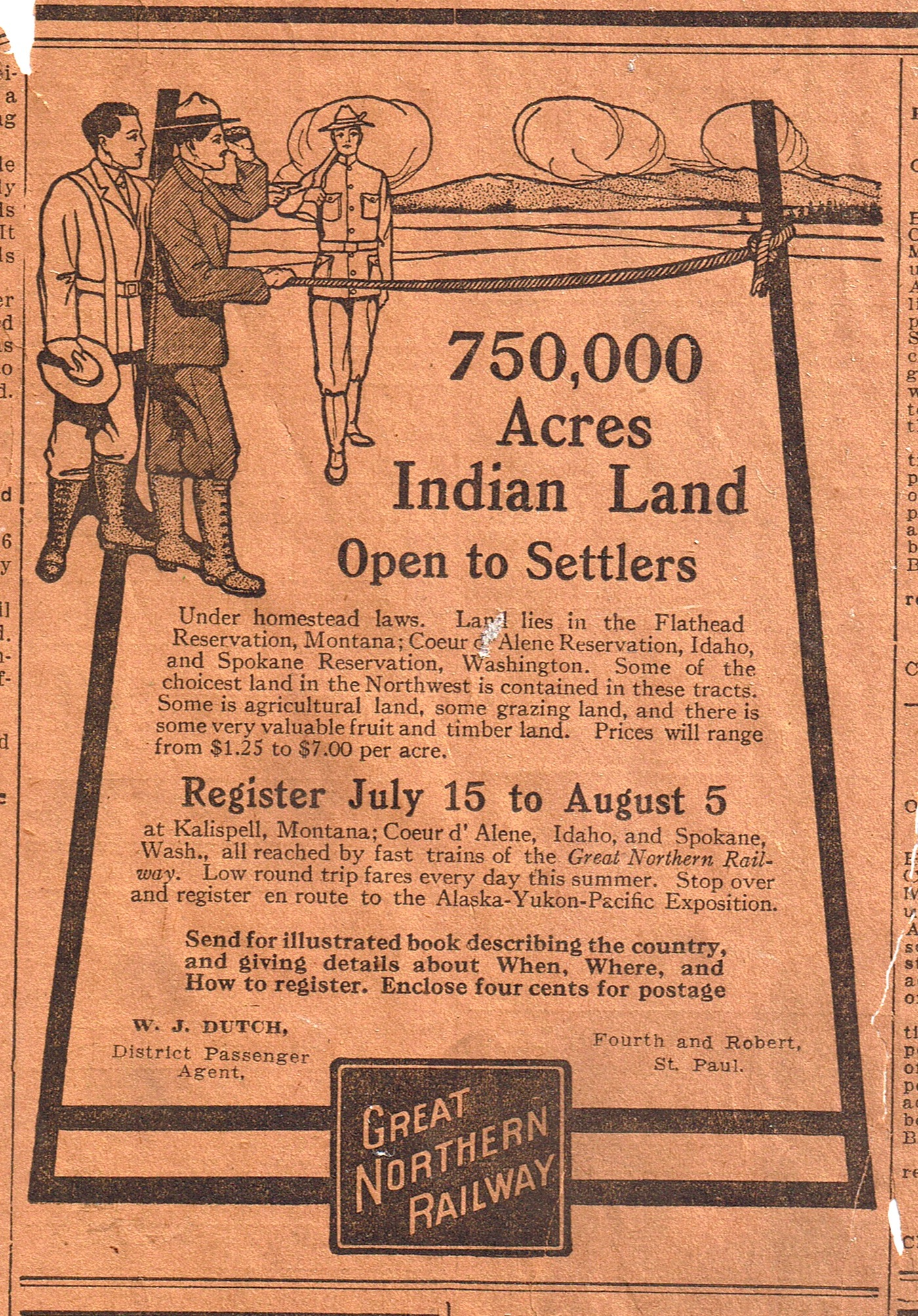
A 1909 ad aimed at settlers, from a St. Paul newspaper

=== Branch lines in Fraser Valley, British Columbia, Canada ===
Between 1891 and 1917 GNR built a number of railway branch lines across the border with Canada. These lines were built to provide service to the city of New Westminster, Victoria (via ferry connection) and the new city of Vancouver. The first line was built between 1891 and 1893 providing a connection between Seattle and New Westminster. This line crossed at Blaine, passed through Cloverdale and terminated in Brownsville. In 1903 GNR constructed a line running from Cloverdale to Port Guichon (Present day Ladner, BC). A ferry service from the port provided service to Victoria and Vancouver Island. In 1909 this line was extended from Cloverdale to Huntingdon. Service from Blaine to New Westminster was redirected in 1909 over a new line past White Rock, across Mud Bay, through Annieville and on to Brownsville. After a new railway bridge was completed across the Fraser River from Brownsville to New Westminster the GNR extended its railway line to Vancouver. Between 1910 and 1913 GNR excavated the Grandview Cut to give it access to False Creek and used the resulting dirt to fill in the east end of False Creek. In 1915, on this infill, the GNR opened Union Station, the terminus of its rail line in Vancouver. Its service to Vancouver and Victoria experienced competition from a partnership between Northern Pacific and Canadian Pacific. This competing service terminated at Pacific Station in Downtown Vancouver and from there offered direct steamship service to Victoria, thus offering a superior alternative to both services offered by GNR.

=== Settlements ===
The Great Northern energetically promoted settlement along its lines in North Dakota and Montana, especially by Germans and Scandinavians from Europe. The Great Northern bought its lands from the federal government – it received no land grants – and resold them to farmers one by one. It operated agencies in Germany and Scandinavia that promoted its lands, and brought families over at low cost, building special colonist cars to transport immigrant families. The rapidly increasing settlement in North Dakota's Red River Valley along the Minnesota border between 1871 and 1890 was a major example of large-scale "bonanza" farming.

=== Later history ===
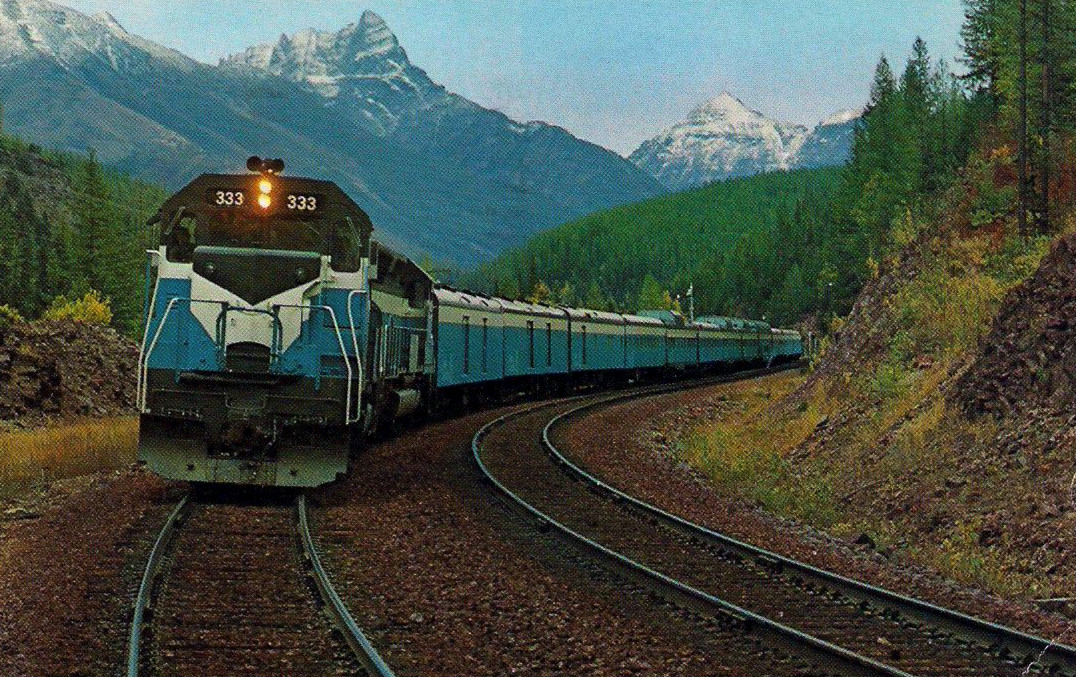
The Big Sky Blue Empire Builder with an SDP45 in the lead. (1970)

During World War II, the Army moved its Military Railway Service (MRS) headquarters to Fort Snelling, Minnesota. The MRS worked collaboratively with commercial railroading in the U.S. The Great Northern sponsored the 704th Grand Railroad Division. It was the second Grand Division that the Army stood up. The Great Northern also sponsored the 732nd Railroad Operating Battalion (ROB). They were one of two spearhead ROBs. The 732nd operated in support of the Patton's 3rd Armored Division crossing into Germany with them. The Officers of the 732nd were all previous employees of the Great Northern.

On March 2, 1970, the Great Northern, together with the Northern Pacific Railway, the Chicago, Burlington and Quincy Railroad and the Spokane, Portland and Seattle Railway, merged to form the Burlington Northern Railroad. The BN operated until 1996 when it merged with the Atchison, Topeka and Santa Fe Railway to form the Burlington Northern and Santa Fe Railway.

== Passenger service ==
GN operated various passenger trains, but the Empire Builder was their premier passenger train. It was named in honor of James J. Hill, known as the "Empire Builder." Amtrak still operates the Empire Builder today, running it over the old Great Northern's Northern Transcon north of St. Paul. The GN had commuter service in the Minneapolis area running between Great Northern Depot and Hutchinson.

=== Named trains ===
- Alexandrian: St. Paul–Fargo
- Badger Express: St. Paul-Superior/Duluth (later renamed Badger)
- Cascadian: Seattle–Spokane (1909–1959)
- Dakotan: St. Paul-Minot
- Eastern Express: Seattle-St. Paul (1903–1906) (replaced by Fast Mail in 1906)
- Empire Builder: Chicago-Seattle/Portland (1929–present)
- Fast Mail No. 27: St. Paul–Seattle (1906–1910) (renamed The Oregonian in 1910)
- Glacier Park Limited: St. Paul–Seattle (1915–1929) (replaced by Empire Builder in 1929)
- Gopher: St. Paul-Superior/Duluth
- Great Northern Express: (1909–1918) Kansas City-Seattle
- International: Seattle-Vancouver, B.C.
- Oregonian : St. Paul–Seattle (1910–1915) (replaced by Glacier Park Limited in 1915)
- Oriental Limited : Chicago-St. Paul-Seattle (replaced by Western Star in 1951)
- Puget Sound Express: St. Paul-Seattle (1903–1906) (replaced by Fast Mail in 1906)
- Red River Limited: Grand Forks-St. Paul (later renamed Red River)
- Seattle Express
- Southeast Express: (1909–1918) Seattle-Kansas City
- Western Star : Chicago-St. Paul-Seattle-Portland
- Winnipeg Limited: St. Paul-Winnipeg

== Rolling stock ==
In 1951 the company owned 844 locomotives, including 568 steam, 261 diesel-electric and 15 all-electric, as well 822 passenger-train cars and 43,897 freight-train cars.

== Paint schemes ==
The Great Northern had numerous paint scheme variations and color changes over the years, but Rocky the goat was consistently featured.

== Preservation ==
=== Preserved steam locomotives ===
Image	Locomotive no.	Class	Type	Built	Retired	City	Location	Extra information
	1 – William Crooks	1	4-4-0	1861	9/1897	Duluth, Minnesota	Lake Superior Railroad Museum	In June 1962, the Great Northern transferred ownership to the Minnesota Historical Society; Was at Saint Paul Union Depot from June 1954 to 1975
	1147	F-8	2-8-0	8/1902	6/1956	Wenatchee, Washington	Lions Locomotive Park; 1100 South Wenatchee Avenue	Location also called "Mission Street Park"
	1246	F-8	2-8-0	11/1907	7/1953	Snoqualmie, Washington	Northwest Railway Museum	Purchased from Fred Kepner Collection upon his death in 2021; Was stored by Kepner in Merrill, Oregon. Acquired by Northwest Railway Museum in April 2023.
	1355	H-5	4-6-2	Rebuilt from E-14 1020 5/1924	7/1955	Sioux City, Iowa	Milwaukee Shops	Undergoing restoration to operating condition
	2507	P-2	4-8-2	10/1923	12/1957	Wishram, Washington	Wishram Depot	Hidden under shelter
	2523	P-2	4-8-2	10/1923	4/1958	Willmar, Minnesota	Kandiyohi County Historical Society	
	2584	S-2	4-8-4	3/1930	12/1957	Havre, Montana	Havre Depot	Largest surviving GN steam locomotive
	3059	O-1	2-8-2	2/1913	12/1957	Williston, North Dakota	Williston Depot	

=== Preserved diesel locomotives ===
Image	Locomotive no.	Class	Type	Built	Retired	City	Location	Extra information
	136	SW-4	EMD NW-2	9/1942	4/1982	Mineral, Washington	Mount Rainier Scenic Railroad	
	181	RS-1	EMD NW-3	3/1942	8/1965	Whitefish, Montana	Whitefish Depot	Static Display
	192	RS-2	EMD NW-5	12/1946	4/1982	Duluth, Minnesota	Lake Superior Railroad Museum	Operational
	274B	F-3-7-AB	EMD F7A	10/1950	12/1980	Garibaldi, Oregon	Oregon Coast Scenic Railroad	Operational
	325	SDP-40	EMD SDP40	5/1966	6/2008	Saint Paul, Minnesota	Minnesota Transportation Museum	Operational
	400	SD-45	EMD SD45	5/1966	?/1986	Duluth, Minnesota	Lake Superior Railroad Museum	Owned by Great Northern Railway Historical Society (GNRHS), leased to LSRM in Duluth, previously leased to MTM in St Paul, MN.
	454A	F-3-7-AB	EMD F7A	3/1950	3/1981	Saint Paul, Minnesota	Minnesota Transportation Museum	In restoration, currently in NP colors.
	458B	F-3-7-AB	EMD F3B	10/1948	?/1973	Saint Paul, Minnesota	Minnesota Transportation Museum	As BN Heater Car HC16.
	558	SD-7	EMD SD7	5/1952		Saint Paul, Minnesota	Minnesota Transportation Museum	Currently displayed as BN 6008
	573	SD-9	EMD SD9	2/1954		Duluth, Minnesota	Lake Superior Railroad Museum	Operational, restored as BNSF 1550
	598	SD-9	EMD SD9	4/1958		Reardan, Washington	Inland Northwest Rail Museum	In Restoration
	599	SD-9	EMD SD9	4/1958		Reardan, Washington	Inland Northwest Rail Museum	In restoration
	LST&T 101	SW-4	EMD NW2	2/1948	?/1986	Saint Paul, Minnesota	Minnesota Transportation Museum	In Restoration
	LST&T 105	SW-?	EMD SW1200	7/1957	?/1987	Saint Paul, Minnesota	Minnesota Transportation Museum	As NP 105

=== Rails to Trails ===
In addition to the Stone Arch Bridge, parts of the railway have been turned into pedestrian and bicycle trails. In Minnesota, the Cedar Lake Trail is built in areas that were formerly railroad yards for the Great Northern Railway and the Minneapolis and St. Louis Railway. Also in Minnesota, the Dakota Rail Trail is built on 26.5 miles of the railroad right-of-way. In Kalispell, Montana the original Great Northern grade from 1892 has been converted into a trail. The trail starts in Kila, MT, and goes to Kalispell Montana, travelling through downtown, right past the Kalispell Depot. The section of rails from Kila to West Kalispell was taken out in the early 1900s, while the section from downtown to where the current end of rail is, was taken out in 2021. Further west, the Iron Goat Trail in Washington follows the late 19th-century route of the Great Northern Railway through the Cascades and gets its name from the railway's logo. The Spokane and Inland Empire Railroad that James J. Hill purchased in 1929 became a bicycle path between Spokane, Wa and Coeur d'Alene, Id. and Spokane, Wa. and Pullman, Wa.

== In popular culture ==
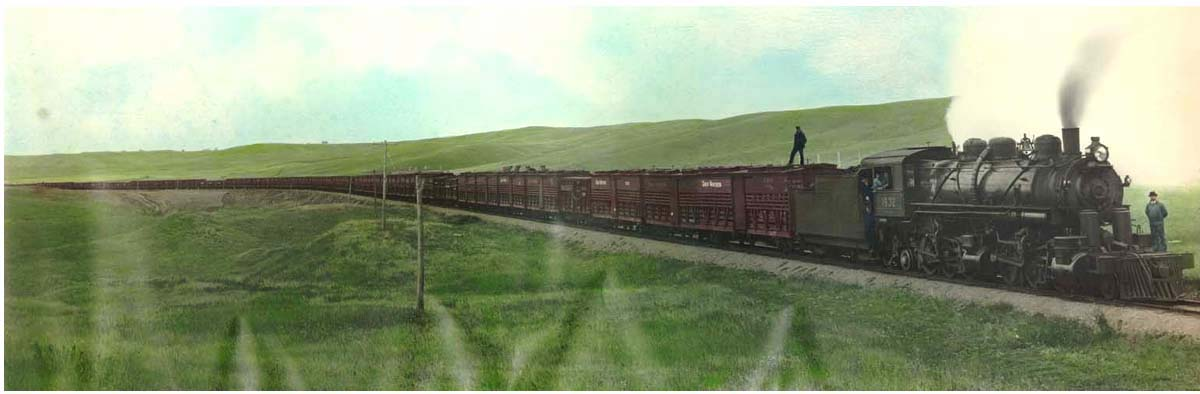
A Great Northern Railway train pauses for the photographer four miles west of Minot in 1914.

Appearances in popular culture:

- The Great Northern Railway is considered to have inspired (in broad outline, not in specific details) the Taggart Transcontinental railroad in Ayn Rand's Atlas Shrugged.
- The song Great Northern by the Western band Riders in the Sky featured on their 2002 album Ridin' the Tweetsie Railroad describes a journey along the Great Northern Railway.
- The Great Northern is mentioned in the song "Jack Straw," written by Bob Weir and Robert Hunter and originally performed by The Grateful Dead.
- The protagonists in the movie Hostiles board a Great Northern Railway train headed from Butte, Montana to Chicago at the end of the film.

== See also ==
- Great Northern Roster
- Great Northern Railway: Mansfield Branch (1909-1985)
- W-1 GN's largest electric locomotive
- Spokane and Inland Empire Railroad interurban electric railway purchased by G.N. in 1929.
- Western Fruit Express
- Snow Dozer – A snowplow design unique to the Great Northern.
