= Great Northern class F-8 =

Class of US steam locos

Great Northern F-8 class
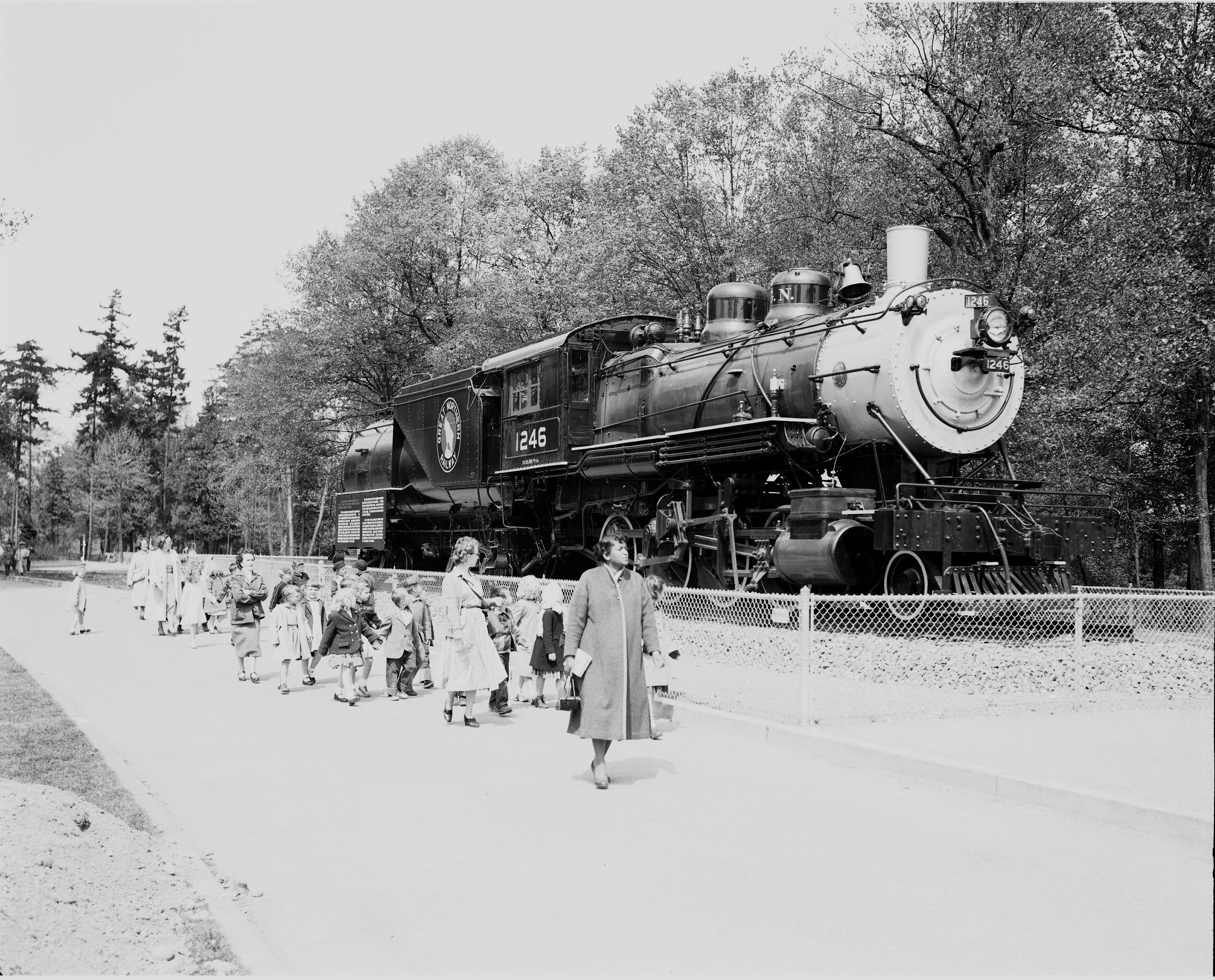
- Great Northern 1246 at Woodland Park, Seattle, Washington, U.S., 1954.
Type and origin
- Power type: Steam
- Builder: Rogers Locomotive and Machine Works (60); American Locomotive Company (15); Baldwin Locomotive Works (50)
- Model: Baldwin 10-34-E, (#1878 to #1927)
- Build date: October 1901 – December 1907
- Total produced: 125
Specifications
- Configuration
  - Whyte: 2-8-0
  - UIC: 1′D n2
- Gauge: 4 ft 8 1/2 in (1,435 mm) standard gauge
- Leading dia.: 33 in (838 mm)
- Driver dia.: 55 in (1,397 mm)
- Axle load: 48,630 lb (22,060 kilograms; 22.06 metric tons)
- Adhesive weight: 180,000 lb (82,000 kilograms; 82 metric tons)
- Loco weight: 195,000 lb (88,000 kilograms; 88 metric tons)
- Fuel type: Fuel oil
- Fuel capacity: 4,500 US gal (17,000 L; 3,700 imp gal) oil
- Water cap.: 8,000 US gal (30,000 L; 6,700 imp gal)
- Boiler: 74 1/8 in (1,883 mm)
- Boiler pressure: 210 lbf/in^{2} (1.45 MPa)
- Cylinders: Two
- Cylinder size: 20 in × 32 in (508 mm × 813 mm) (F-8); 26 in × 32 in (660 mm × 813 mm) (F-8S) (Some "F-8"s rebuilt to have 23.5 in × 32 in (597 mm × 813 mm)
Performance figures
- Tractive effort: 41,540 lbf (184.78 kN) (F-8); 55,160 lbf (245.36 kN) (F-8S) (Some "F-8"s rebuilt to have 45,060 lbf (200.44 kN))
Career
- Operators: Great Northern
- Class: F-8
- Numbers: 1140–1264
- Retired: 1932–1956
- Preserved: Two (Nos. 1147 and 1246)
- Disposition: Great Northern 1147 on display in Wenatchee, Washington; Great Northern 1246 moved to Northwest Railway Museum in Snoqualmie, WA. Remainder scrapped

The Great Northern F-8 is a class of 125 2-8-0 "Consolidation" type steam locomotives built by the Rogers Locomotive and Machine Works, their corporate successor the American Locomotive Company, and Baldwin Locomotive Works between 1901 and 1907 and operated by the Great Northern Railway until the mid 1950s. They operated throughout the Great Northern pulling freight trains with some being rebuilt with larger cylinders and higher boiler pressure, giving them more tractive effort. Retirement of the F-8s started as early as 1932, but some would last and continue to pull freight until 1956, when the last F-8 was retired.

== History ==
The F-8's pulled mostly freight trains throughout their career, with certain ones being rebuilt to attain higher tractive efforts. They operated on the Great Northern Railroad from 1901. Beginning in 1932 some were scrapped, until the railroad was dieselized in the 1950’s. By 1956 all of them were retired and scrapped, except for Nos. 1147 and 1246 which have since been preserved.

== Preservation ==
- Great Northern 1147 was retired on June 2, 1956, and put on display in a city park in Wenatchee, Washington.
- Great Northern 1246 was retired and placed on display at Woodland Park in Seattle, Washington on July 18, 1953. It went on loan to Fred Kepner in 1978 for restoration for tourist operation. It was then moved to Chemult, then Klamath and now Merrill, Oregon in 2002. 1246's tender was sold to the Heber Valley Railroad in 2022 as Kepner's collection was disposed of after his death. In 2023, the locomotive was acquired by the Northwest Railway Museum and has been moved to Snoqualmie, Washington in April 2023.
