= Red River Limited =

American passenger train

Red River
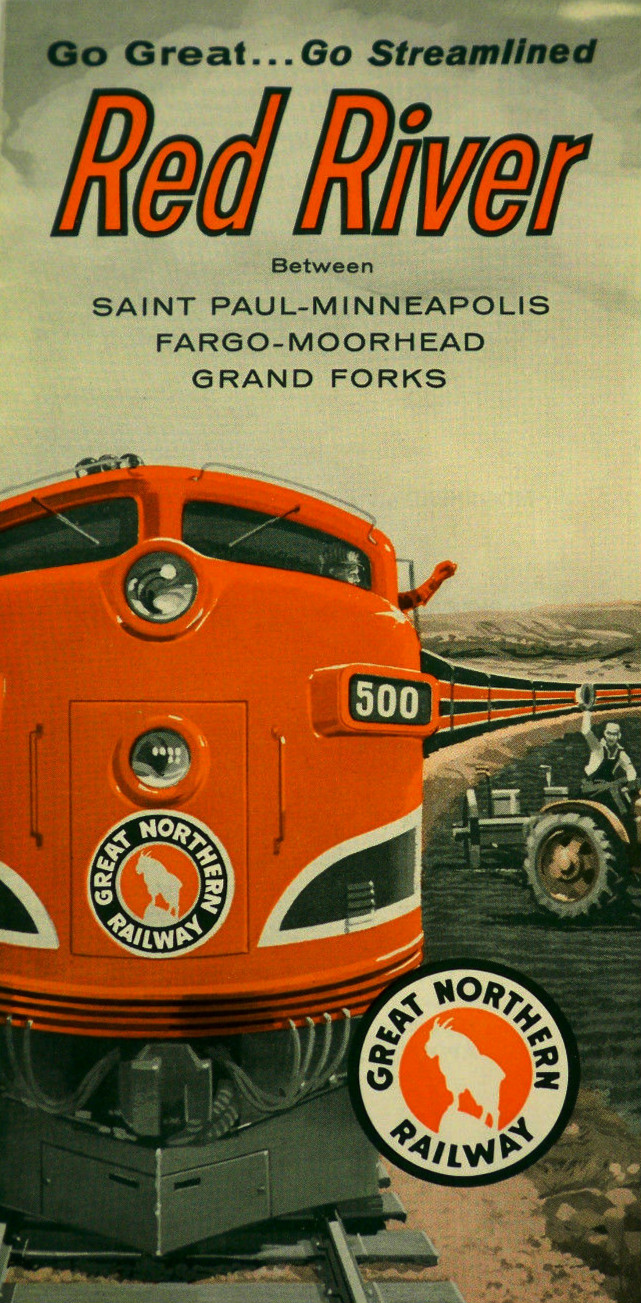
- Photo from a 1959 brochure

Overview
- Service type: Inter-city rail
- Status: Discontinued
- First service: June 25, 1950
- Last service: 1968
- Current operator: Great Northern Railway

Route
- Termini: St. Paul, Minnesota; Grand Forks, North Dakota, Fargo, North Dakota
- Distance travelled: 324 miles (521 km)
- Train number: 11/12 (11/14)

The Red River was a passenger train operated by Great Northern Railway between Grand Forks, North Dakota, and Saint Paul, Minnesota.

== History ==
Great Northern Railway's third new train set of 1950 was a new schedule named the Red River. The five car streamliner, built by American Car and Foundry Company, began service June 25, 1950, operating a daily round trip 324 miles (521 km) each way between Grand Forks, North Dakota, and Saint Paul, Minnesota. The train went southbound in the morning returning northbound in the evening.

The cars for the Red River streamliner were quite different than those built for the International (another 1950 introduction) in that the Red River's cars had extra insulation and the coaches were equipped with Baker Heaters as there was no steam heat available at the Grand Forks depot where the cars stood overnight. The locomotive was sent to the roundhouse each evening for any running repairs and service so the solution was the installation of the Baker Heaters in the cars.

| Car number | Car type |
|---|---|
| 512 | EMD E7A 2,000 HP Diesel Passenger Unit |
| 1107 | Baggage 30’ Railway Post office Car |
| 1137 | 60 Revenue seat Coach |
| 1138 | 60 Revenue seat Coach |
| 1139 | 60 Revenue seat Coach |
| 1147 | 9 seat Lunch Counter; 12 seat Dinette; 16 Revenue seat Parlor Lounge Observation |

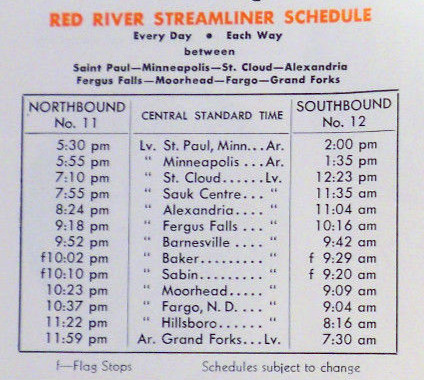
1959 schedule.

The service was discontinued in 1968.
