= Great Northern class O-1 =

Class of 145 American 2-8-2 Mikado Type steam locomotive

Great Northern O-1 class
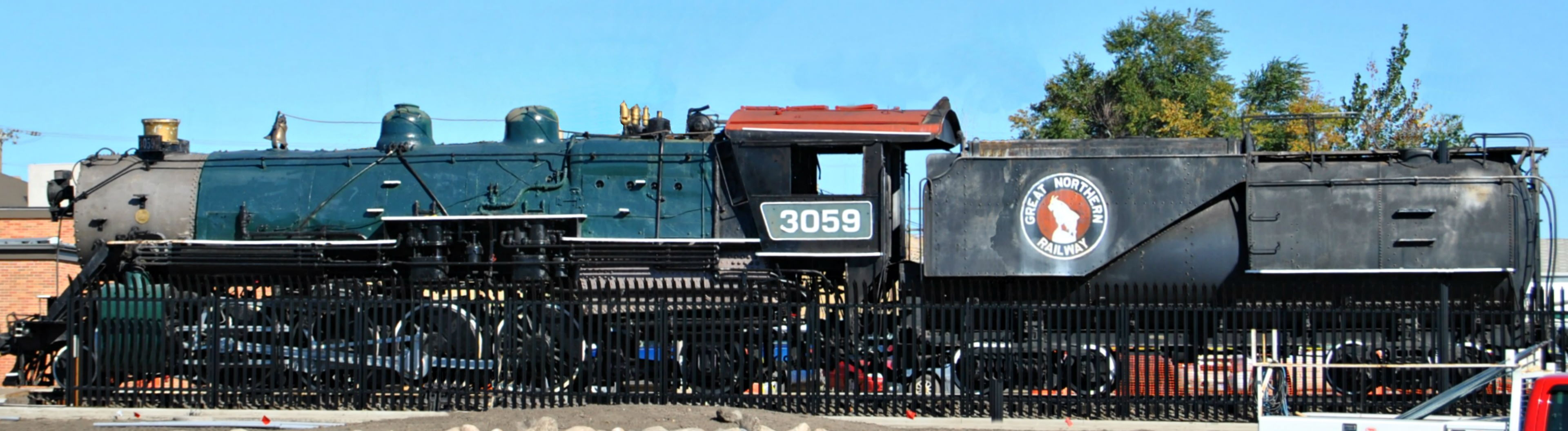
- Great Northern No. 3059 on display in Williston, North Dakota
Type and origin
- Power type: Steam
- Builder: Baldwin Locomotive Works
- Model: Baldwin 12-50-1/4-E, (nos. 1–20, 296–245, 316–340, 366–415)
- Build date: August 1911-February 1919
- Total produced: 145
Specifications
- Configuration
  - Whyte: 2-8-2
  - UIC: 1′D1′ h2
- Gauge: 4 ft 8 1/2 in (1,435 mm) standard gauge
- Leading dia.: 33 in (838 mm)
- Driver dia.: 63 in (1,600 mm)
- Trailing dia.: 42.5 in (1,080 mm)
- Wheelbase: Batch 1: 68.08 ft (20,751 mm); Batch 2/3: 78.48 ft (23,921 mm)
- Height: 16 ft 0 3/4 in (4.90 m)
- Axle load: Batch 1: 55,000 lb (25,000 kilograms; 25 metric tons), Batch 2: 59,000 lb (27,000 kilograms; 27 metric tons), Batch 3: 57,250 lb (25,970 kilograms; 25.97 metric tons)
- Adhesive weight: Batch 1: 220,000 lb (100,000 kilograms; 100 metric tons), Batch 2: 236,000 lb (107,000 kilograms; 107 metric tons), Batch 3: 229,000 lb (104,000 kilograms; 104 metric tons)
- Loco weight: Batch 1: 280,000 lb (130,000 kilograms; 130 metric tons), Batch 2: 315,360 lb (143,040 kilograms; 143.04 metric tons), Batch 3: 306,500 lb (139,000 kilograms; 139.0 metric tons)
- Tender weight: Batch 1: 154,100 lb (69,900 kilograms; 69.9 metric tons), Batch 2: 187,000 lb (85,000 kilograms; 85 metric tons), Batch 3: 154,100 lb (69,900 kilograms; 69.9 metric tons)
- Total weight: Batch 1: 434,100 lb (196,900 kilograms; 196.9 metric tons), Batch 2: 502,360 lb (227,870 kilograms; 227.87 metric tons), Batch 3: 460,600 lb (208,900 kilograms; 208.9 metric tons)
- Fuel type: Batch 1/3: Coal, Batch 2: Fuel oil
- Fuel capacity: Batch 1/3: 13 short tons (11.8 t; 11.6 long tons) coal, Batch 2: 4,500 US gal (17,000 L; 3,700 imp gal) oil
- Water cap.: Batch 1/3: 8,000 US gal (30,000 L; 6,700 imp gal), Batch 2: 10,000 US gal (38,000 L; 8,300 imp gal)
- Firebox
  - Grate area: 78.20 sq ft (7.265 m^{2})
- Boiler: 89 in (2,261 mm)
- Boiler pressure: Batch 1: 170 lbf/in^{2} (1.17 MPa), Batch 2/3:210 lbf/in^{2} (1.45 MPa)
- Heating surface
  - Firebox: 249 sq ft (23.1 m^{2})
- Cylinders: Two
- Cylinder size: 28 in × 32 in (711 mm × 813 mm)
Performance figures
- Tractive effort: Batch 1: 57,543 lbf (255.96 kN); Batch 2/3: 71,083 lbf (316.19 kN)
- Factor of adh.: Batch 1: 3.82; Batch 2: 3.32; Batch 3: 3.22
Career
- Operators: Great Northern
- Class: O-1
- Numbers: 3000–3144
- Retired: 1948-1958
- Preserved: One (No. 3059)
- Disposition: Great Northern 3059 on display in Williston, North Dakota, remainder scrapped

The Great Northern O-1 was a class of 145 American 2-8-2 "Mikado"-type steam locomotives built by the Baldwin Locomotive Works between 1911 and 1919 and used by the Great Northern Railway until the late 1950s.

The O-1s, along with other O Class Mikados of the Great Northern, were used system-wide to pull freight trains. As of today, only one O-1 has been preserved, No. 3059, from the second batch of O-1s. It was retired in December 1957 and is on display near the Williston depot in Williston, North Dakota.

== Design of the locomotives ==
The class featured a Belpaire firebox 117 inches (2.97 m) deep by 96 inches (2.44 m) wide; giving a grade area of 78 square feet (7.2 m^{2}). This was attached to a tapered boiler that was pressed to 180 pounds per square inch (1.24 MPa) – even though it had been designed for 210 pounds per square inch (1.45 MPa) – feeding steam to two 28-by-32-inch (711 mm × 813 mm) cylinders, which were connected to 63 inches (1.600 m) diameter driving wheels by Walschaerts valve gear. The last five locomotives were delivered with Southern valve gear; however, these were later replaced with Walschaerts.

== Construction of the locomotives ==
All 145 locomotives were built by Baldwin Locomotive Works in four batches between August 1911 and February 1919. Baldwin class 12-50-1/4-E was assigned.

Table of orders and numbers
Year	Quantity	Baldwin serial numbers	Baldwin class numbers	GN numbers	Notes
1911	20	36832–33, 36910–17, 36937–42, 36969–72	1–20	3000–3019	
1913	50	39089–104, 39150–58, 39163–72, 39205–12, 39296–302	196–245	3020–3069	
1916	25	43989–93, 44095–99, 44144–46, 44197–204, 44253–54, 44438–39	316–340	3070–3094	
1917–19	50	46066–68, 46110, 46163, 46213, 46277, 46891, 48150, 48257–60, 48468, 48524, 48573, 48675–76, 48732–33, 48775, 48893, 48943, 48995, 49079–80, 49158, 49226, 49299–300, 49356–57, 49408, 49481–82, 49639, 49659–61, 49731, 50051, 50359–60, 51011, 51035, 51083, 51156, 51234, 51236	366–415	3095–3145	

Two engines were built as oil burners: 3020 and 3021.

== Railroad Service ==
All were assigned to haul freight trains system wide. During the 1940s, twelve (3004, 3022, 3033, 3048, 3071, 3100, 3106, 3135, 3137, 3138, 3142, 3144) were equipped with boosters, which added between 11,000 and 12,200 pounds-force (49 and 54 kN) of tractive effort; these were removed in the early 1950s. Between 1925 and 1944, thirteen O-1s (Nos. 3023, 3024, 3026, 3028, 3029, 3039, 3043, 3064, 3099, 3108, 3121, 3122 and 3134) were sold to the Spokane, Portland and Seattle Railway.

Two engines were retired after being involved in wrecks: 3113 in 1946, and 3128 in 1949; the latter was so badly damaged it was scrapped on site.

The remaining locomotives were retired between 1948 and 1958. The Great Northern were in no hurry to scrap them as it was as late as 1963 that the last locomotive to be scrapped was cut up.

Table of retirements and scrappings
Year	Quantity in service at start of year	Quantity retired or scrapped	Numbers	Notes
1925	145	3	3026, 3028, 2039	to SP&S 500, 501, 502
1926	142	1	3099	to SP&S 503
1928	141	2	3039, 3043	to SP&S 504, 505
1929	139	2	3023, 3024	to SP&S 506, 507
1943	137	2	3064, 3121	to SP&S 508, 509
1944	135	3	3108, 3122, 3134	to SP&S 511, 510, 512
1946	132	1	3113	Wreck retirement
1948	131	3	3049, 3086, 3107	
1949	128	10	3005, 3010, 3014, 3048, 3092, 3094, 3098, 3111, 3128, 3143	3128 Wreck retirement, scrapped on site
1951	118	6	3015, 3016, 3018, 3046, 3074, 3091	3018 retirement date; scrap date unknown
1952	112	29	3002–3004, 3007–3009, 3011, 3019, 3022, 3027, 3031, 3032, 3038, 3041, 3047, 3053, 3055, 3057, 3060, 3068, 3070, 3072, 3079, 3082, 3084, 3088, 3093, 3102, 3131	3011 and 3019 retirement dates; scrap date unknown
1953	83	36	3001, 3013, 3017, 3020, 3021, 3025, 3033–3035, 3040, 3051, 3056, 3058, 3061, 3063, 3065, 3069, 3073, 3078, 3080, 3085, 3087, 3095–3097, 3104–3106, 3110, 3118, 3123, 3124, 3127, 3132, 3141, 3142	
1955	47	29	3006, 3030, 3036, 3037, 3042, 3052, 3054, 3062, 3066, 3067, 3071, 3075, 3076, 3081, 3083, 3089, 3090, 3100, 3103, 3109, 3114, 3115, 3125, 3126, 3130, 3133, 3136, 3137, 3140	
1956	18	2	3077, 3116	
1957	16	10	3000, 3012, 3045, 3050, 3059, 3112, 3117, 3119, 3120, 3139	3120 scrapped 1957; 3059 donated 1958; 3000, 3012, 3045, 3112, 3117, 3119 scrapped 1962; 3050, 3139 scrapped 1963.
1958	6	6	3044, 3101, 3129, 3135, 3138, 3144	3129 scrapped 1962, others scrapped 1963.

The Spokane, Portland and Seattle Railway scrapped its O-1s between 1945 and 1950.

== Preservation ==
Only one O-1 has survived into preservation, No. 3059 of the second batch. It was built in February 1913 and retired in December 1957. On August 2, 1958, it was donated for display near the Williston Depot in Williston, North Dakota and currently resides there. It is the sole surviving Great Northern "Mikado" type steam locomotive.
