= Great Northern class H-5 =

Great Northern H-5 class
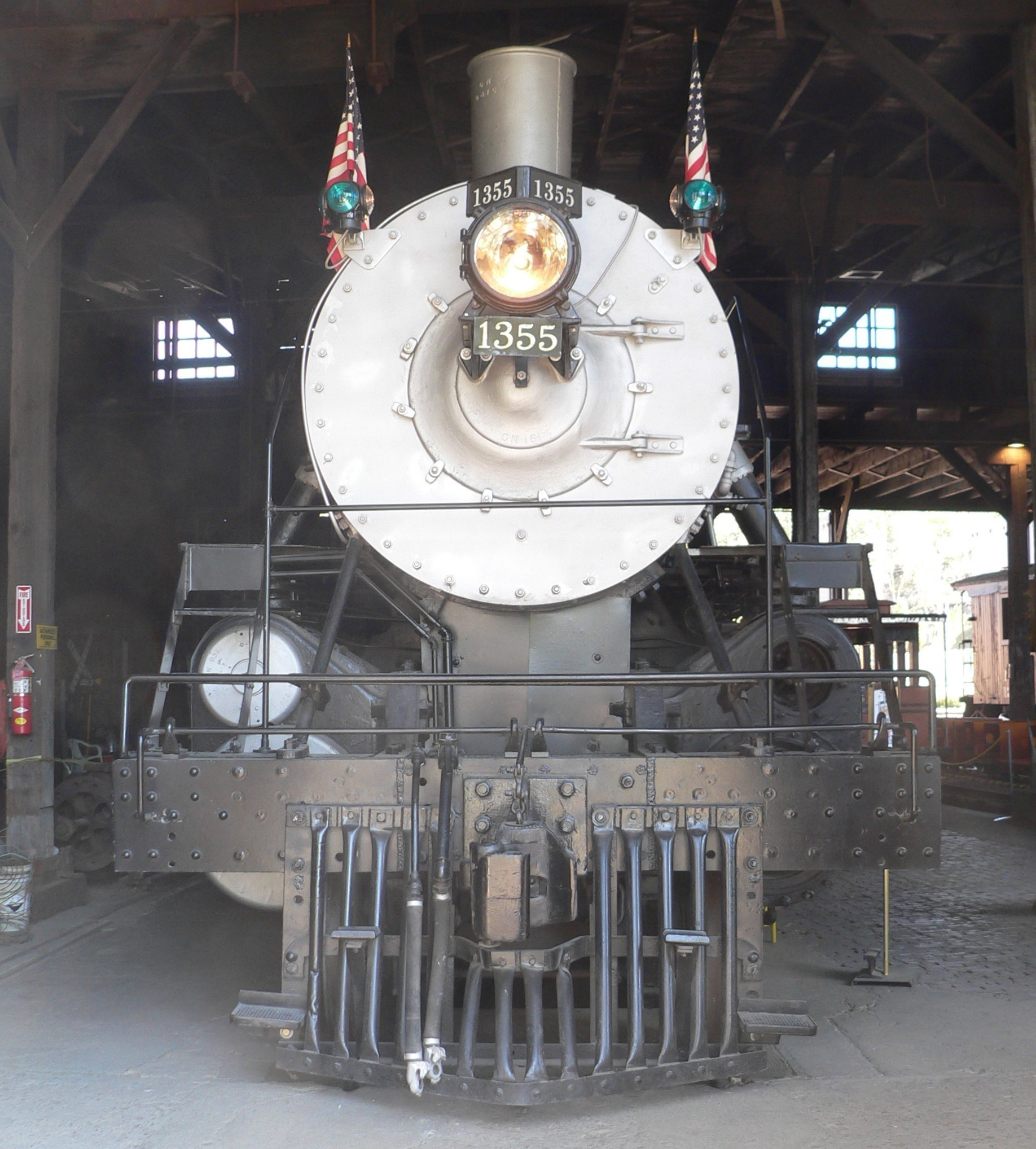
- Great Northern Steam Locomotive No. 1355, on display at Milwaukee Railroad Shops in Sioux City, Iowa.
Type and origin
- Power type: Steam
- Builder: Baldwin Locomotive Works; Great Northern Railway
- Build date: 1909, 1921–1928
- Total produced: 25
Specifications
- Configuration
  - Whyte: 4-6-2
  - UIC: 2′C1′ h1
- Gauge: 4 ft 8 1/2 in (1,435 mm) standard gauge
- Leading dia.: 36 in (914 mm)
- Driver dia.: 73 in (1,854 mm)
- Trailing dia.: 45 in (1,143 mm)
- Wheelbase: Loco & tender: 72.03 ft (21.95 m)
- Axle load: 57,666 lb (26,157 kilograms; 26.157 metric tons)
- Adhesive weight: 164,000 lb (74,000 kilograms; 74 metric tons)
- Loco weight: 271,800 lb (123,300 kilograms; 123.3 metric tons)
- Tender weight: 188,400 lb (85,500 kilograms; 85.5 metric tons)
- Total weight: 460,200 lb (208,700 kilograms; 208.7 metric tons)
- Fuel type: Oil
- Fuel capacity: 4,500 US gal (17,000 L; 3,700 imp gal)
- Water cap.: 10,000 US gal (38,000 L; 8,300 imp gal)
- Firebox
  - Grate area: 50.40 sq ft (4.682 m^{2})
- Boiler pressure: 210 lbf/in^{2} (1.45 MPa)
- Heating surface
  - Firebox: 247 sq ft (22.9 m^{2})
- Superheater
  - Heating area: 3,904 sq ft (362.7 m^{2})
- Cylinders: Two, outside
- Cylinder size: 23.5 in × 30 in (597 mm × 762 mm)
- Valve gear: Walschaert
Performance figures
- Tractive effort: 40,511 lbf (180.20 kN); 51,511 lbf (229,130 N) with booster
- Factor of adh.: 4.34
Career
- Operators: Great Northern Railway
- Class: H-5
- Numbers: 1009–1032, 1350–1374
- Retired: 1941, 1950–1955
- Preserved: One preserved (No. 1355)
- Disposition: Great Northern 1355 under restoration in Sioux City, Iowa, remainder scrapped

The Great Northern H-5 was a class of 25 4-6-2 "Pacific" type steam locomotives that were originally built as E-14 4-6-0 "Ten-Wheelers" by the Baldwin Locomotive Works in 1909 and operated by the Great Northern Railway until the mid-1950s.

The locomotives hauled passenger trains on the Great Northern mainline, such as the Empire Builder and the Oriental Limited.

Today, only one H-5 survives, No. 1355. It was retired in July 1955 and moved to the Milwaukee Road shops in Sioux City, Iowa where it still resides today.

== History ==
The class was originally built in 1909 as E-14 "Ten Wheelers", then, between October 6, 1921, and July 8, 1928, they have been rebuilt into H-5 "Pacifics" and hauled mainly passenger trains such as the Empire Builder and the Oriental Limited. The first ten were numbered 1486–1495, then renumbered 1350–1359. They were also converted from coal to oil and some were fitted with boosters that added 11,000 lbf (48.93 kN) of tractive effort. Later in their service life, they were reassigned to freight service, such as hauling iron ore on the Mesabi Range. As the railroad made a transition to diesel power, retirement started on September 13, 1950, and by August 25, 1955, all the H-5s have been retired.

== Preservation ==
Only one H-5 has been preserved, No. 1355. It was retired in July 1955 and put on display at the Milwaukee Road shops in Sioux City, Iowa, where it still resides today. It was also added to the National Register of Historic Places in 2004 as Great Northern Railway Steam Locomotive No. 1355 and Tender 1451. Furthermore, it is the sole surviving Great Northern "Pacific" type steam locomotive. In July 2024, it was announced that 1355 is undergoing restoration to operating condition.

== Roster ==
Number	Baldwin serial number	Date built	Disposition	Notes
1350		July 8, 1928	Sold for scrap July 16, 1953.	
1351		January 11, 1922	Wrecked July 24, 1941, scrapped October 1941.	
1352		October 6, 1921	Sold for scrap July 16, 1953.	Received booster that added 11,000 lbs of tractive effort from the late 1920 to the mid-1930s.
1353		November 14, 1921	Sold for scrap July 16, 1953.	Received booster that added 11,000 lbs of tractive effort from the late 1920 to the mid-1930s.
1354		March 20, 1922	Sold for scrap April 26, 1952.	
1355	33908	May 29, 1924	Retired July 1955, on display at the Milwaukee Road shops in Sioux City, Iowa. Undergoing restoration to operating condition.	Received booster, removed 1929. On the National Register of Historic Places
1356		March 26, 1923	Sold for scrap April 26, 1952.	Received booster that added 11,000 lbs of tractive effort from the late 1920 to the mid-1930s.
1357		January 26, 1925	Sold for scrap May 2, 1952.	
1358		December 30, 1922	Sold for scrap September 13, 1950.	
1359		June 4, 1924	Sold for scrap August 25, 1955.	
1360		April 16, 1926	Sold for scrap July 16, 1953.	
1361	33989	March 22, 1926	Sold for scrap April 21, 1953.	
1362		May 8, 1926	Sold for scrap November 13, 1951.	
1363		May 28, 1926	Sold for scrap July 16, 1953.	Received booster that added 11,000 lbs of tractive effort from the late 1920 to the mid-1930s.
1364		June 15, 1926	Sold for scrap October 28, 1952.	
1365		December 23, 1926	Sold for scrap April 1, 1952	
1366		February 9, 1927	Sold for scrap December 28, 1954.	
1367		April 11, 1927	Sold for scrap June 8, 1951.	
1368		June 17, 1927	Sold for scrap April 22, 1952.	
1369		January 4, 1927	Sold for scrap April 26, 1955.	
1370		April 29, 1927	Sold for scrap October 1, 1952.	
1371	33884	May 27, 1927	Sold for scrap August 25, 1955.	
1372	33886	July 9, 1927	Sold for scrap April 21, 1953.	
1373	33841	August 9, 1927	Sold for scrap December 28, 1954.	
1374		November 18, 1927	Sold for scrap October 10, 1952.	

== 1941 head-on collision ==
On July 24, 1941, No. 1351 was tasked to pull a regular three-car passenger train from Vancouver, British Columbia to Seattle, Washington, and en route, it was to travel over a single-track line shared by GN and the Canadian National (CN) in the Brunette Valley near New Westminster. The GN No. 1351 crew—consisting of engineer John Caray and fireman A. Hager—were new to their jobs at the time, and they were ordered to stop at a siding to wait for the second section of CN’s Transcontinental passenger train to pass before proceeding on the single-track, but when the first section of the Transcontinental passed, the engineer allegedly mistook it as the train they were supposed to wait for.

The train then proceeded too early and traversed onto the single-track at less than 25 miles per hour (40 km/h), and at 9:42 am, it collided head-on with the second section of the Transcontinental, led by CN 2-8-2 No. 3377. No. 1351’s tender telescoped into the mail car directly behind it, and while the locomotive remained upright, the H-5 was smashed up front, with the smokebox being torn from the boiler and the frame being cracked. John Caray was severely injured, as were No. 3377 engineer Herbert H. Mills and fireman Tillinger. A. Hager was killed upon impact, as was CN baggage man Harold H. Krinks, and twenty-one other passengers and crew members on both trains received minor injuries.

Many people arrived at the scene to help bring the injured passengers and crew to safety, and a second mainline had to be temporarily built to clear the wreckage. Following the accident, No. 1351 became the first H-5 to be retired, and it was scrapped in October 1941, after GN decided it was damaged beyond economical repair.
