= Northwest Railway Museum =

- Snoqualmie Depot
- U.S. National Register of Historic Places
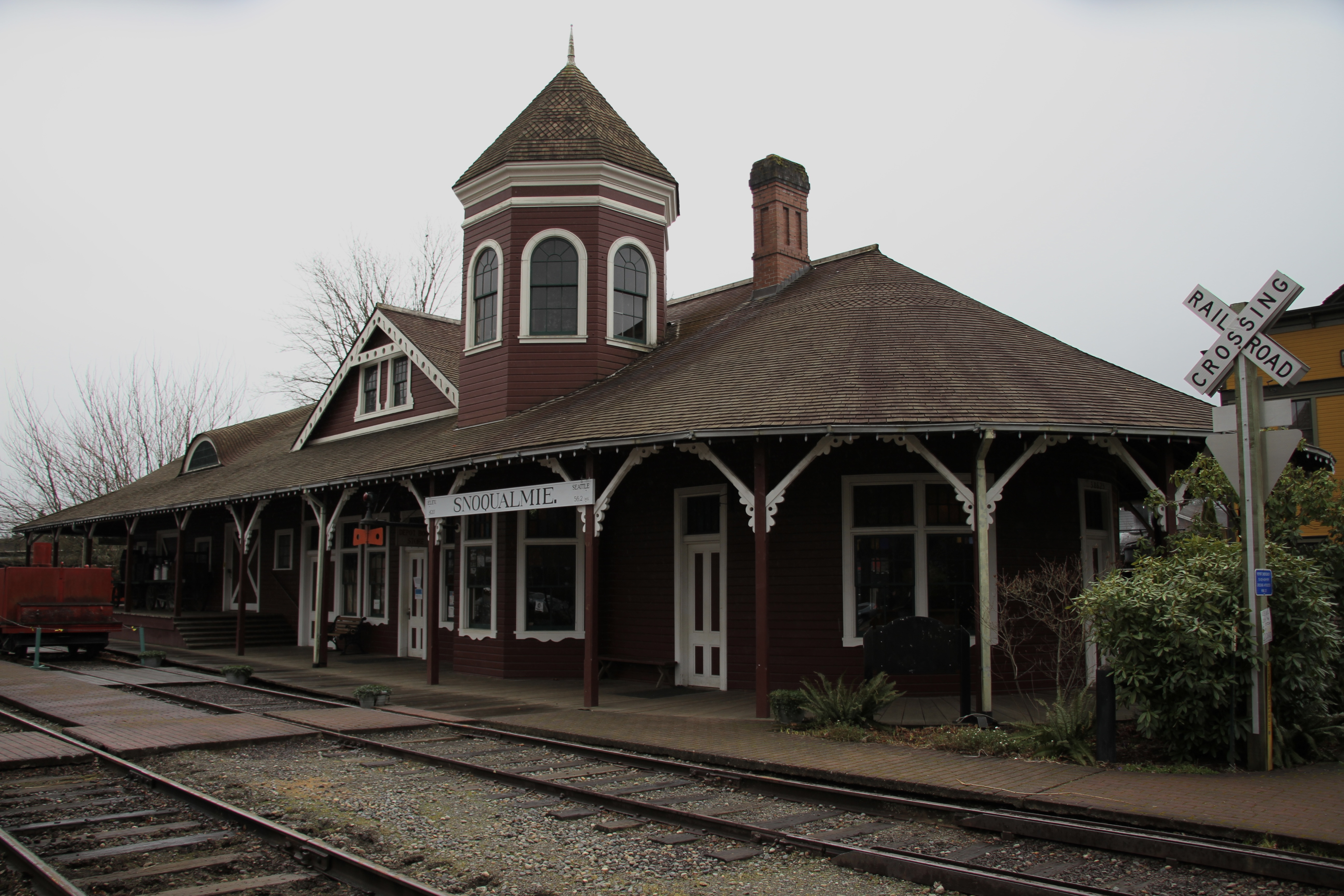
- Snoqualmie Depot

- Location within Washington (state)
- Location: 38625 S.E. King St. Snoqualmie, Washington
- Coordinates: 47°31′43″N 121°49′28″W
- Area: less than one acre
- Built: 1890
- Built by: Seattle, Lake Shore and Eastern Railway
- Architectural style: Victorian
- NRHP reference No.: 74001963
- Added to NRHP: July 24, 1974

The Northwest Railway Museum (NRM) is a railroad museum in Snoqualmie, King County, Washington. It consists of a heritage railway, historic depot, exhibit hall, archive center and a two track shop dedicated to restoring railroad equipment. The museum serves more than 130,000 visitors per year.

The heritage railway incorporates 5.5 miles of the line built in 1889 by the Seattle, Lake Shore and Eastern Railway (SLS&E). The SLS&E was part of Seattle's response to the Northern Pacific selecting Tacoma as their western terminus. The construction of this line was an attempt to build over Snoqualmie Pass, on to Walla Walla. The SLS&E was later purchased by the Northern Pacific in 1901.

== Snoqualmie Depot ==
Built in 1890 by the Seattle, Lake Shore, & Eastern, this uniquely designed depot was built to serve several different purposes. The station chiefly served as the gateway to this early recreation area, but also served as an outlet for local products to the markets of Seattle. An atypical design was the result of this need for a rural combined freight-passenger depot, however, one with lavish decorations to reflect the holiday spirit of vacationers from Seattle. Visitors came to enjoy Snoqualmie Falls along with other outdoor recreation the area could provide.

The station is a large frame building about 125 by 50 feet (38 by 15 m) with a generous 9 feet (2.7 m) eaves. A bay window features the telegrapher's office. The semicircular north end stands out in this design. The eaves are supported by wooden pillars and diagonal braces and scroll work decorates the intersection of the braces with the eaves and the pillars. The current structure was modified from the original, in which the bay window continued up through the roof and formed an octagonal tower a full story in height. A two sash window with a semicircular upper sash appeared on each face of the tower and a prominent cornice separated the tower body from the steeply pitched roof. The roof was decorated with fancy butt shingles and capped with a finial. A large swept dormer was placed in the southern part of the main structure above the freight section, Cast iron cresting and fancy butt shingles decorated the roof of both the main body and the transverse dormer. The freight dock, was wider originally and ran the length of the entire rear third of the station, is now a small porch in front of a single sliding freight door.

The Snoqualmie depot is listed on the National Register of Historic Places, ID #74001963.

== Museum ==
The Northwest Railway Museum was founded in 1957 as the Puget Sound Railway Historical Association. As part of a general reorganization, the museum took its current name in September 1999. The mission of the organization is to develop and operate a nationally significant railway museum where the public can learn the role railroads in the development of the Pacific Northwest, and experience a railroad operating with historic practices and equipment.

The museum's collection includes a variety of railway cars and locomotives that showcase the growth of railroads in the Pacific Northwest from the 1870s to the present. The museum also includes a significant 3,000-volume library and research archive that focuses on the history of railroads in the Northwest and on technical and other engineering aspects of railroading. On the heritage railroad, volunteers and staff members are trained in the use of historic operating practices, showcasing how railroads operated prior to the invention of technologies like two-way radios.

== Railway History Campus ==
The Railway History Campus serves as the core of the museum, hosting several different buildings providing for the preservation of history.

In 2006, the Museum dedicated the new Conservation and Restoration Workshop (CRW), phase one of the Railway History Campus. The CRW hosts repairs and restoration work on the museum's equipment, including locomotives, passenger cars, and freight cars. It features 8,200 square feet (760 m^{2}) of floor space, two tracks with full-length inspection pits, and a foundation specially designed for heavy machining equipment. The building is used to perform functions once conducted in railroad backshops. A full assortment of carpentry and machining equipment allows the museum to produce parts that have been out of production since the 1960s.

The Train Shed Exhibit Hall provides 25,000 square feet (2,300 m^{2}) and four tracks of climate controlled, indoor storage. Approximately one third of the museum's historic equipment can be stored in the building. The building allows for the display of exhibits and artifacts dedicated to historic Northwest railroading, such as the Wellington Avalanche.

The Railway Education Center hosts the museum's specially constructed archival vault and research library, a classroom, and administrative offices.

== Collection ==
=== Steam locomotives ===
Locomotive details
Locomotive	Type	Status	Notes	Image
Northern Pacific 924	N.P. Class L-5 0-6-0	Operational	Built in 1899 by the Rogers Locomotive Works for the St. Paul & Duluth Railway. Originally numbered 74. Renumbered to 924 when the Northern Pacific purchased the St. Paul & Duluth in 1901. Sold to the Inland Empire Paper Company in 1925. Donated to the museum in 1969. The locomotive was restored to operation in 2020 and runs excursions on special occasions.	
Great Northern 1246	Great Northern Class F-8 2-8-0	Display	Built in 1907 by the Baldwin Locomotive Works. Retired 1953 and donated to the City of Seattle for display at Woodland Park Zoo. Sold 1980 to a private collector, disassembled, and moved to southern Oregon. Repatriated in 2023 in exchange for U.P. #529.	
Canadian Colleries 14	4-6-0	Unrestored	Purchased by the museum in 1960 with CC#17. Built in 1898 by the Baldwin Locomotive Works for the Union Colliery Company as #4, later Canadian Collieries #14.	
Canadian Colleries 17	2-6-0ST+T (Formerly 0-6-0ST)	Unrestored	Purchased by the museum in 1960 with CC #14. Built by the Baldwin Locomotive Works in 1891.	
S.A. Agnew Lumber Company 1	Lima 3-Truck Shay	Unrestored	Built by the Lima Locomotive Works in 1904 for the Newhouse Mines and Smelter Co. Donated and moved to the museum in 1969.	
Ohio Match Company 4	Heisler 2-Truck	Display	Built by the Heisler Locomotive Co. as Ohio Match Co. #4, for Ohio Match's logging operations near Hayden Lake, Idaho. Purchased by the museum in 1967.	
Union Pacific 529	U.P. Class C-57 2-8-0	Awaiting movement	Built by the Baldwin Locomotive works in 1903. Retired and gifted to the museum in 1965 by the Ed Hines Lumber Company. Exchanged for Great Northern Ry. 1246 with the Oregon Coast Scenic Railroad. Awaiting movement to the OCSR.	
United States Plywood Corporation 11	Logging Mallet 2-6-6-2	Cosmetically restored	Built in 1926 by the Baldwin Locomotive Works. Restored in 1974, operated until 1990. Was cosmetically restored in 2005.	
Weyerhaeuser Timber Company 6	Logging Mallet 2-6-6-2	Unrestored	Built in 1928 by the Baldwin Locomotive Works. Donated in 1965 by the Weyerhauser Timber Company. Restored to operation in 1969 and last operated in 1974.	
Olympic Portland Cement Company 7	H.K. Porter 0-4-0T	Display	Built 1918 by the H.K. Porter company. Owned first by the Department of the Navy and used at the Puget Sound Navy Yard. Later used by two cement companies. Retired in 1960 and donated to the City of Bellingham for display at a public park. In 2017, the City of Bellingham presented the locomotive to the Museum.	

=== Diesel-Electric locomotives ===
Locomotive details
Locomotive	Type	Status	Notes	Image
Snoqualmie Valley Railroad 4012	B-L-H RS-4-TC	Operational	Built 1954 by the Baldwin Locomotive Works. Ex US Army 4012. Purchased by the museum in 2001 from the General Services Administration. Painted maroon.	
Snoqualmie Valley Railroad 4024	B-L-H RS-4-TC	Operational	Built 1954 by the Baldwin Locomotive Works. Ex US Army 4024. Purchased by the museum from the General Services Administration in 2001. Painted orange with the Northwest Railway Museum logo on the front and sides of the engine. Currently the primarily used diesel engine on the Snoqualmie Valley Railroad.	
Weyerhaeuser Timber Company 1	Fairbanks-Morse H12-44	Display; operable	Built 1951. Purchased in 1987 and operated on the museum's railroad. Restored to as-delivered appearance 2010-2011.	
Northern Pacific 125	ALCo. HH660	Under restoration	Built February 1940. Purchased by the museum in 2001. Moved to museum in 2021. Oldest surviving NP diesel-electric.	
United States Navy 7320	GE 45-ton switcher	Display	Built 1941. Last operated 1994. On display at the Snoqualmie Depot. Cecil the Diesel Mascot.	

=== Gasoline-Mechanical locomotives ===
Locomotive details
Locomotive	Type	Status	Notes	Image
J. H. Baxter Company 6-C	Whitcomb MO12	Display	Built 1925. Restored 2000. On display at the Snoqualmie Depot.	
St. Regis Paper Company 463	Plymouth ML-6	Display	Built 1943. Gifted 1977.	

=== Passenger cars ===
The Northwest Railway Museum maintains 18 passenger cars of various time periods, manufactured between 1881 and 1998. Most of these cars were built by either Barney and Smith, the St. Louis Car Company, or Pullman. SP&S passenger cars 213, 218, 272, and 276 normally operate with one of the museum's diesel locomotives and/or Northern Pacific 924 for excursion service on the Snoqualmie Valley Railroad.

=== Freight, industrial, and maintenance of way equipment ===
The museum owns a total of 39 other railway equipment artifacts in various forms, previously operating for a wide variety of Northwest railroads. While not included as historic equipment, there are also various pieces of equipment used to maintain the railway, some of which dates as far back as the 1950s.

== Heritage railroad ==
The Northwest Railway Museum operates a heritage railroad called the Snoqualmie Valley Railroad. This 11-mile (18 km) round trip route allows museum visitors to experience a train excursion aboard antique railroad coaches dating to 1915 and earlier. Trains are scheduled either Saturday, or Saturday and Sunday depending on the time of year, with chartered or special trains on various days. The railroad typically carries over 60,000 passengers per year. The railroad hosts several special events, such as the Day Out with Thomas event every July. Other events include Christmas & Halloween trains, wine tasting specials, and chartered excursions such as educational trains and corporate events.

== See also ==
- List of heritage railroads in the United States
