= William Kenney (business executive) =

American business executive

William Patrick Kenney
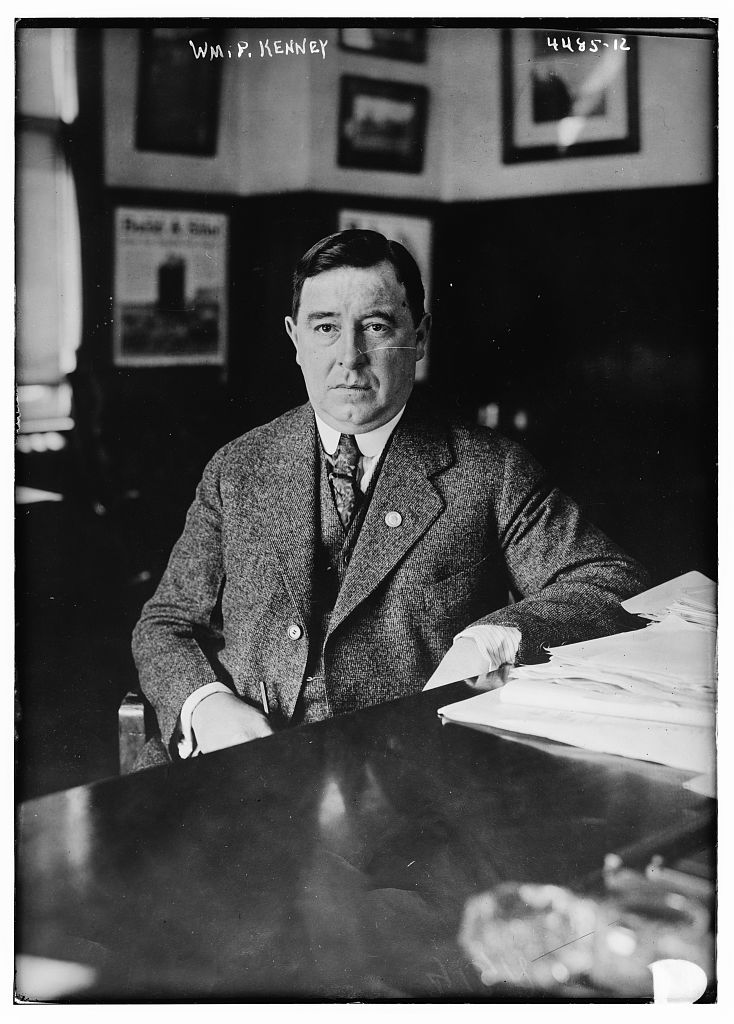
- Kenney in 1918

President of the Great Northern Railway
- In office January 1, 1932 – January 24, 1939
- Preceded by: Ralph Budd

Personal details
- Born: January 10, 1870 Watertown, Wisconsin, United States
- Died: January 24, 1939 (aged 69) St. Paul, Minnesota, United States

William Patrick Kenney (January 10, 1870 – January 24, 1939) was an American business executive, who served as president of the Great Northern Railway.

== Biography ==
He was born on January 10, 1870, in Watertown, Wisconsin.

As a boy in Minneapolis, Kenney delivered newspapers. He used a goat to pull his wagonload of papers until the neighbors objected to the smell and the goat was sold to a rancher in Montana. Later, Kenney joined the Great Northern Railway, which needed a trademark. He suggested the image of the goat to James J. Hill, the "Empire Builder" who ran the railroad, and it was adopted.

In 1931, he was vice president and director of traffic at the Great Northern Railway. He replaced Ralph Budd as president on January 1, 1932.

He died at St. Joseph's Hospital in St. Paul, Minnesota, on January 24, 1939.
