= List of Great Northern Railway (U.S.) locomotives =

This is a list of United States Great Northern Railway locomotives.

== Steam locomotive classes ==
Below is a table of information for the Great Northern Railway's steam roster with a symbol, Whyte notation, common name and notes. Included is a breakdown of the Great Northern classes, along with the date of their first construction (when known), builder, and road numbers.

=== 0-6-0 ===
Image	Class	Wheel arrangement	Fleet number(s)	Manufacturer	Serial numbers	Year made	Quantity made	Quantity preserved	Year(s) retired	Comments
	0-6-0 — OOO									
	A-1	0-6-0	13	Rogers		1879	1	0	1905-1955	
	A-2	0-6-0	30 & 31	Rogers		1888	2	0	1915	30 sold to McCoy Logging Co.
	A-3	0-6-0	47 & 48	Rogers		1890 & 1891	2	0	1915-1943	
	A-4	0-6-0	27–29	Brooks		1882	3	0	1944-1947	
	A-5	0-6-0	32-46	Brooks & Rogers		1887-1896	15	0	1945-1949	
	A-6	0-6-0	58-59, 378-379	Brooks Locomotive Works		1899	4	0	1950-1951	
	A-7	0-6-0	60–69	Brooks Locomotive Works		1900	3	0	1952-1959	
	A-8	0-6-0	70-72	Rogers		1887–1890	3	0	1900-1959	
	A-9	0-6-0	1-12, 14-26, 49-57, 73-94, 380-399	Rogers, Baldwin & GN	506	1889	71	0	1931-1954	
	A-10	0-6-0	95–99	Brooks Locomotive Works		1898-1900	5	0	1922-1957	
	A-11	0-6-0	30-31			1916	2	0	1939, 1946	

=== 0-8-0 ===
Image	Class	Wheel arrangement	Fleet number(s)	Manufacturer	Serial numbers	Year made	Quantity made	Quantity preserved	Year(s) retired	Comments
	0-8-0 — OOOO									
	C-1	0-8-0	810-849	Baldwin		1918-1919	40	0	1956-1958	
	C-2	0-8-0	850–859	Brooks		1901	20	0	1939-1953	Rebuilt from F-6 classes.
	C-3	0-8-0	875–899	Brooks		1903	25	0	1939-1953	Rebuilds from F-9 Consolidations.
	C-4	0-8-0	780–782	Baldwin		1902-1908	3	0	1947-1951	Rebuilt from F-8s.
	C-5	0-8-0	1174–1193					0		

=== 2-6-0 ===
Image	Class	Wheel arrangement	Fleet number(s)	Manufacturer	Serial numbers	Year made	Quantity made	Quantity preserved	Year(s) retired	Comments
	2-6-0 — oOOO — Mogul									
	D-1	2-6-0	477–480	Baldwin		1889	4	0	1900-1939	
	D-2	2-6-0	300–349	Rogers		1887–1889	50	0	1905-1951	
	D-3	2-6-0	432	Baldwin		1901	1	0	1952	
	D-4	2-6-0	400-426	Brooks		1895	27	0	1930-1959	
	D-5	2-6-0	450–476	Brooks		1896	27	0	1955-1959	
	D-6	2-6-0	430–431	Schenectady		1902 & 1906	2	0	1956-1957	
	D-7	2-6-0						0	1958	
	D-8	2-6-0						0	1959	

=== 2-6-2 ===
Image	Class	Wheel arrangement	Fleet number(s)	Manufacturer	Serial numbers	Year made	Quantity made	Quantity preserved	Year(s) retired	Comments
	2-6-2 — oOOOo — Prairie									
	J-1	2-6-2	1500–1552	Baldwin		1906	53	0	1927-1936	1514, 1524, 1531, 1537, 1539 & 1549 classified as J-1s, 1517, 1519, 1523, 1525, and 1528 Rebuilt as H-6s in 1921-1926.
	J-2	2-6-2	1554–1649	Baldwin		1907	53	0	1927-1937	1554- 1556, 1566, 1573, 1594-1598, 1622, 1624, 1637, 1638 and 1649 classified as J-2s
	J-3	2-6-2	1549	Baldwin	28851	1906	1	0	1941	Delivered as J-1 with Baldwin Superheater, re-classed as J-3.

=== 2-8-0 ===
Image	Class	Wheel arrangement	Fleet number(s)	Manufacturer	Serial numbers	Year made	Quantity made	Quantity preserved	Year(s) retired	Comments
	2-8-0 — oOOOO — Consolidation									
	F-1	2-8-0	500–565	Brooks		1892, 1893	66	0	1924-1950	508 & 544 classified as F-1s
	F-2	2-8-0	595–599	Baldwin		1892	45	0	1928-1929	
	F-3	2-8-0	701	Brooks		1898	1	0	1939	Rebuilt from G-2 class 701 in 1902.
	F-4	2-8-0	1094-1099	Baldwin		1896, 1901	6	0	1932-1947	1095 and 1097 Rebuilt as C-5 switchers, completed 1930.
	F-5	2-8-0	1095–1109	Rogers		1901	15	0	1938-1950	1100-1104 classified as F-5s, 1102 sold to City of Prineville Railway 1945, 1108 and 1109 Rebuilt as C-5s in 1929-1930.
	F-6	2-8-0	1100-1129	Brooks		1901	20	0	1939-1953	1100-1144, 1116, 1177, 1119, 1120, 1122-1124, 1126-1129 classified as F-6s, All Rebuilt as C-2s 850-869 (Numbers not in order) in 1925-1927.
	F-7	2-8-0	1130–1139	Cooke		1901	10	0	1939-1954	1130-1136 & 1138 classified as F-7s, 1130 donated to Korean National Railways, 1954.
	F-8	2-8-0	1140–1264	Rogers, Alco & Baldwin		1901-1907	125	2	1932–1956	1141, 1143, 1163, 1175, 1182, 1183, 1189, 1190, 1195 and 1196 classified as F-8s; 1147 & 1246 preserved
	F-9	2-8-0	1300-1324	Brooks		1903	25	0	1927–1928	1307, 1311, 1312, 1314 and 1316 classified as F-9s
	F-10	2-8-0	806	Brooks		1898	1	0	1934	Rebuilt from G-5 4-8-0, 1905.
	F-11	2-8-0	590–591	Alco		1912	2	0	1927, 1934	
	F-12	2-8-0	1326–1327	Alco		1907	2	0	1947-1948	

=== 2-8-2 ===
Image	Class	Wheel arrangement	Fleet number(s)	Manufacturer	Serial numbers	Year made	Quantity made	Quantity preserved	Year(s) retired	Comments
	2-8-2 — oOOOOo — Mikado									
	O-1	2-8-2	3000–3144	Baldwin		1911-1919	145	1	1948–1958	3004, 3022, 3033, 3048, 3071, 3100, 3106, 3135, 3137, 3138, 3142 & 3144 were equipped with boosters; 3023, 3024, 3026, 3028, 3029, 3039, 3043, 3064, 3099, 3108, 3121, 3122 and 3134 sold to the Spokane, Portland and Seattle Railway; 3059 preserved
	O-2	2-8-2	3149	Alco (Brooks)		1915	1	0	1947	
	O-3	2-8-2	3200–3208	Alco		1918	9	0	1951–1955	3204-3208 ex-El Paso and Southwestern Railroad, USRA Heavy Mikado
	O-4	2-8-2	3210–3254	Baldwin		1920	45	0	1950-1958	3211 and 3214 sold to the Spokane, Portland and Seattle Railway;
	O-5	2-8-2	3300–3344	Baldwin		1922	45	0	1938-1950	
	O-6	2-8-2	3350–3371	Baldwin		1925	22	0	1947-1958	
	O-7	2-8-2	3375–3396	Baldwin		1930	22	0	1953-1958	Rebuilt as O-8s in 1944-1946.
	O-8	2-8-2	3397–3399	GN		1932	3	0	1958	Largest "Mikado" Type ever built.

=== 2-10-2 ===
Image	Class	Wheel arrangement	Fleet number(s)	Manufacturer	Serial numbers	Year made	Quantity made	Quantity preserved	Year(s) retired	Comments
	2-10-2 — oOOOOOo — Santa Fe									
	Q-1	2-10-2	2100-2129	Baldwin		1923	30	0	1950-1958	2100-2109, 2111, 2112, 2116, 2117, 2119-2129 received boosters
	Q-2	2-10-2	2175–2189	Baldwin		1928	15	0	1953–1958	Rebuilt from P-1s; 2179, 2181, 2184, 2185, 2187 and 2189 received boosters

=== 4-4-0 ===
Image	Class	Wheel arrangement	Fleet number(s)	Manufacturer	Serial numbers	Year made	Quantity made	Quantity preserved	Year(s) retired	Comments
	4-4-0 — ooOO — American									
	1	4-4-0	1	New Jersey		1861	1	1	1923	William Crooks; First locomotive to operate in Minnesota; preserved
	B-1	4-4-0	240	Cooke		1866	1	0	1925	
	B-2	4-4-0						0	1927	
	B-3	4-4-0	241-244, 248	Pittsburgh & Baldwin		1870-1872	5	0	1900-1905	
	B-4	4-4-0	680–691	Baldwin		1879	5	0	1943-1944	
	B-5	4-4-0	265–266	Rogers		1883	2	0	1944-1949	
	B-6	4-4-0	232–237	Rogers		1890	6	0	1945-1951	
	B-7	4-4-0	139	Rome		1882	1	0	1950-1952	
	B-8	4-4-0	288–293	Pittsburgh		1880	6	0	1947-1957	
	B-9	4-4-0	187–196	Pittsburgh		1881	10	0	1930-1955	
	B-10	4-4-0	270–282	Baldwin		1880	13	0	1942-1947	
	B-11	4-4-0	141–142	Baldwin		1890	2	0	1947-1948	
	B-12	4-4-0	144	Rogers		1882	10	0	1949-1950	
	B-10	4-4-0	100–114	Baldwin		1881	15	0	1916-1947	105, 108, and 114 sold to B&O, 101 sold to VW&Y (Returned), 108 and 109 sold to MC (Returned), 103 was the last to be Retired.
	B-14	4-4-0	118–124	Baldwin		1882	7	0	1919-1959	
	B-15	4-4-0	125–134	Schenectady		1882	10	0	1915-1925	
	B-16	4-4-0	135–138	Rhode Island		1882	4	0	1935	
	B-17	4-4-0	145-149	Grant		1882	5	0	1936	
	B-18	4-4-0	150–151	Brooks		1882	2	0	1937	
	B-19	4-4-0	152–186	Brooks		1882	35	0	1939-1947	
	B-20	4-4-0	197–206	Rhode Island		1888	10	0	1932-1948	
	B-21	4-4-0	207–225	Rogers		1887	19	0	1931-1954	
	B-22	4-4-0	226–230	Rogers		1883	4	0	1945	
	B-23	4-4-0	231	Baldwin		1893	1	0	1947	

=== 4-4-2 ===
Image	Class	Wheel arrangement	Fleet number(s)	Manufacturer	Serial numbers	Year made	Quantity made	Quantity preserved	Year(s) retired	Comments
	4-4-2 — ooOOo — Atlantic									
	K-1	4-4-2	1700–1709	Baldwin		1906	10	0	1937-1947	1705-1709 classified as K-1s

=== 4-6-0 ===
Image	Class	Wheel arrangement	Fleet number(s)	Manufacturer	Serial numbers	Year made	Quantity made	Quantity preserved	Year(s) retired	Comments
	4-6-0 — ooOOO — Ten-Wheeler									
	E-1	4-6-0	992–993	Rogers		1890	2	0	1943	
	E-2	4-6-0	910-911	ALCO		1915	2	0	1944	
	E-3	4-6-0	900–909	Rogers		1899	10	0	1935-1947	
	E-4	4-6-0	298–299	Schenectady		1889	2	0	1937-1945	
	E-5	4-6-0						0	1942	
	E-6	4-6-0	925–939	Rogers		1902	15	0	1927-1955	
	E-7	4-6-0	950-969	Brooks		1893	20	0	1924-1927	Originally numbered 650-669.
	E-8	4-6-0	1053–1072	Rogers		1901-1903	20	0	1952-1953	
	E-9	4-6-0	998–999	Baldwin		1892	2	0	1954	
	E-10	4-6-0	1000–1007	Brooks		1898	8	0	1939-1953	Originally numbered 150-157. 1002-1005 & 1007 classified as E-10s.
	E-11	4-6-0						0	1954	
	E-12	4-6-0	970-971	Baldwin		1897	2	0	1946	
	E-13	4-6-0	948–949	Baldwin		1893 & 1896	2	0	1947	949 sold to Waterville railway, 1934.
	E-14	4-6-0	1008-1042	Baldwin		1909-1910	45	0	1937	1008-1032 converted to H-5 Pacifics, Engines 1033-1042 Converted to H-7s. Numbers 1043-1052 sold to SP&S, 1910.
	E-15	4-6-0	1073-1092	Baldwin		1910	20	0	1929-1949	1074-1076 sold to SP&S, 1925.

=== 4-6-2 ===
Image	Class	Wheel arrangement	Fleet number(s)	Manufacturer	Serial numbers	Year made	Quantity made	Quantity preserved	Year(s) retired	Comments
	4-6-2 — ooOOOo — Pacific									
	H-1	4-6-2	2100–2147	Rogers		1904–1907	48	0	1930–1952	
	H-2	4-6-2	1406–1440	Baldwin		1906-1907	35	0	1931-1950	
	H-3	4-6-2	2148–2170	Baldwin		1909	23	4	1945–1959	
	H-4	4-6-2	1441–1485	Baldwin & Lima		1909–1910	45	0	1930-1953	
	H-5	4-6-2	1350–1374	Baldwin		1921-1928	25	1	1950–1955	Rebuilt from E-14s; 1355 preserved
	H-6	4-6-2	1710–1717	Baldwin		1906-1907	18	0	1929-1956	
	H-7	4-6-2	1375–1384	Baldwin		1910	10	0	1949-1960	

=== 4-8-0 ===
Image	Class	Wheel arrangement	Fleet number(s)	Manufacturer	Serial Numbers	Year made	Quantity made	Quantity preserved	Year(s) retired	Comments
	4-8-0 — ooOOOO Twelve-Wheeler or Mastodon									
	G-1	4-8-0	600-615	Brooks		1891, 1893	16	0	1929-1947	610 shown at the 1893 Columbian Exposition.
	G-2	4-8-0	700–733	Brooks		1898	20	0	1927-1939	701 Rebuilt as F-3 Class in 1902.
	G-3	4-8-0	722, 734–769	Rogers		1899-1900	36	0	1937-1953	
	G-4	4-8-0	770–779	Brooks		1900	10	0	1930-1947	
	G-5	4-8-0	800–807	Brooks		1897-1898	8	0	1929-1936	
	G-6	4-8-0	734				1	0	1937-1955	Rebuilt from G-3, addition of larger Cylinders.

=== 4-8-2 ===
Image	Class	Wheel arrangement	Fleet number(s)	Manufacturer	Serial numbers	Year made	Quantity made	Quantity preserved	Year(s) retired	Comments
	4-8-2 — ooOOOOo — Mountain									
	P-1	4-8-2	1750–1764	Lima	1364-1378	1914	15	0	1928	Rebuilt into Q-2s
	P-2	4-8-2	2500–2527	Baldwin	57000-57002, 57084-57085, 57182-57190, 57256-57258, 57339, 57012, 57253, 57341-57347	1930	28	2	1955–1958	2505 & 2506 received boosters; 2507 and 2523 preserved

=== 4-8-4 ===
Image	Class	Wheel arrangement	Fleet number(s)	Manufacturer	Serial numbers	Year made	Quantity made	Quantity preserved	Year(s) retired	Comments
	4-8-4 — ooOOOOoo — Northern									
	S-1	4-8-4	2550–2555	Baldwin	60781–60782, 60807-60810	1929	6	0	1956-1958	2552 received Vestibule cab
	S-2	4-8-4	2575–2588	Baldwin	61211–61216, 61224, 61225, 61237-61242	1930	14	1	1955–1958	First "Northerns" built with 80" driving wheels; Timken roller bearings replaced plain bearings in 1945; 2577, 2582, 2586, 2587 & 2588 received Vestibule cab; 2584 preserved Last New GN Steam from Outside Builder.

=== Mallet and Simple Articulated Locomotives ===
Image	Class	Wheel arrangement	Fleet number(s)	Manufacturer	Serial numbers	Year made	Quantity made	Quantity preserved	Year(s) retired	Comments
	Mallet and Simple Articulated Locomotives									
	L-1	2-6-6-2	1900–1924	Baldwin		1906-1908	25	0	1933-1939	1902, 1903, 1908 & 1921 classified as L-1s
	L-2	2-6-6-2	1805–1844	Baldwin		1907	40	0	1930-1944	1814-1816, 1822, 1824-1826 & 1842 classified as L-2s
	M-1	2-6-8-0	1950–1984	Baldwin		1909-1910	35	0	1926-1927	All rebuilt as M-2 Class 1926-1927.
	M-2	2-6-8-0	1950-1984	Baldwin		1926-1928	35	0	1949-1954	Engines 1950, 1952-1962, 1964, 1966, 1969-1971, 1975-1976, 1978-1979, and 1982 Dismantled and parts Rebuilt into O-7s, 1929-1931.
	N-1	2-8-8-0	2000-2024	Baldwin		1912	25	0	1925-1927	Rebuilt into N-2s between 1925 and 1927
	N-2	2-8-8-0	2000-2024	Baldwin		1930	25	0	1924–1927	Rebuilt into N-3s between 1940 and 1942
	N-3	2-8-8-0	2000-2024	Baldwin		1940–1942	25	0	1955-1957	
	R-1a	2-8-8-2	2030-2043	Baldwin		1925	4	0	1951-1955	2030, 2031, and 2033 assigned to Mesabi Division Ore-steaming, 1952.
	R-1b	2-8-8-2	2034-2043	Great Northern Railway		1928	10	0	1951-1955	
	R-2	2-8-8-2	2044-2059	Great Northern Railway		1929–1930	16	0	1953-1957	
	Z-6	4-6-6-4	4000–4001	Alco		1937	2	0	1946-1955	Ex Spokane, Portland and Seattle Railway 903 and 904, Acquired 1939.

The 4-6-6-4 locomotives (Nos. 903 and 904) were purchased from the Spokane, Portland and Seattle Railway and sold back between 1946 and 1950.

== Electric locomotive Classes ==
Image	Class	Wheel arrangement	Fleet number(s)	Manufacturer	Serial numbers	Year made	Quantity made	Quantity preserved	Year(s) retired	Comments
	3 phase boxcab	B-B	5000–5003	GE & Alco		1909	4	0	1927	
	Z-1	1-D-1	5000A(B), 5002A(B), 5004A(B), 5006A(B), 5008A(B)	Baldwin-Westinghouse		1926-1928	10	0	1956	
	Y-1	1Co+Co1	5010-5017	Alco-GE		1927-1930	8	0	1956	5011 rebuilt with a streamlined appearance and reclassified as Y-1a; 5010, 5012-5017 sold to the Pennsylvania Railroad in 1956
	W-1	B-D-D-B	5018-5019	GE Erie Works	28448, 28449	1947	2	0	1956	5018 sold to the Union Pacific Railroad in 1960
