= Great Northern class P-2 =

Class of 28 American 4-8-2 Mountain Type steam locomotives

Great Northern P-2 class
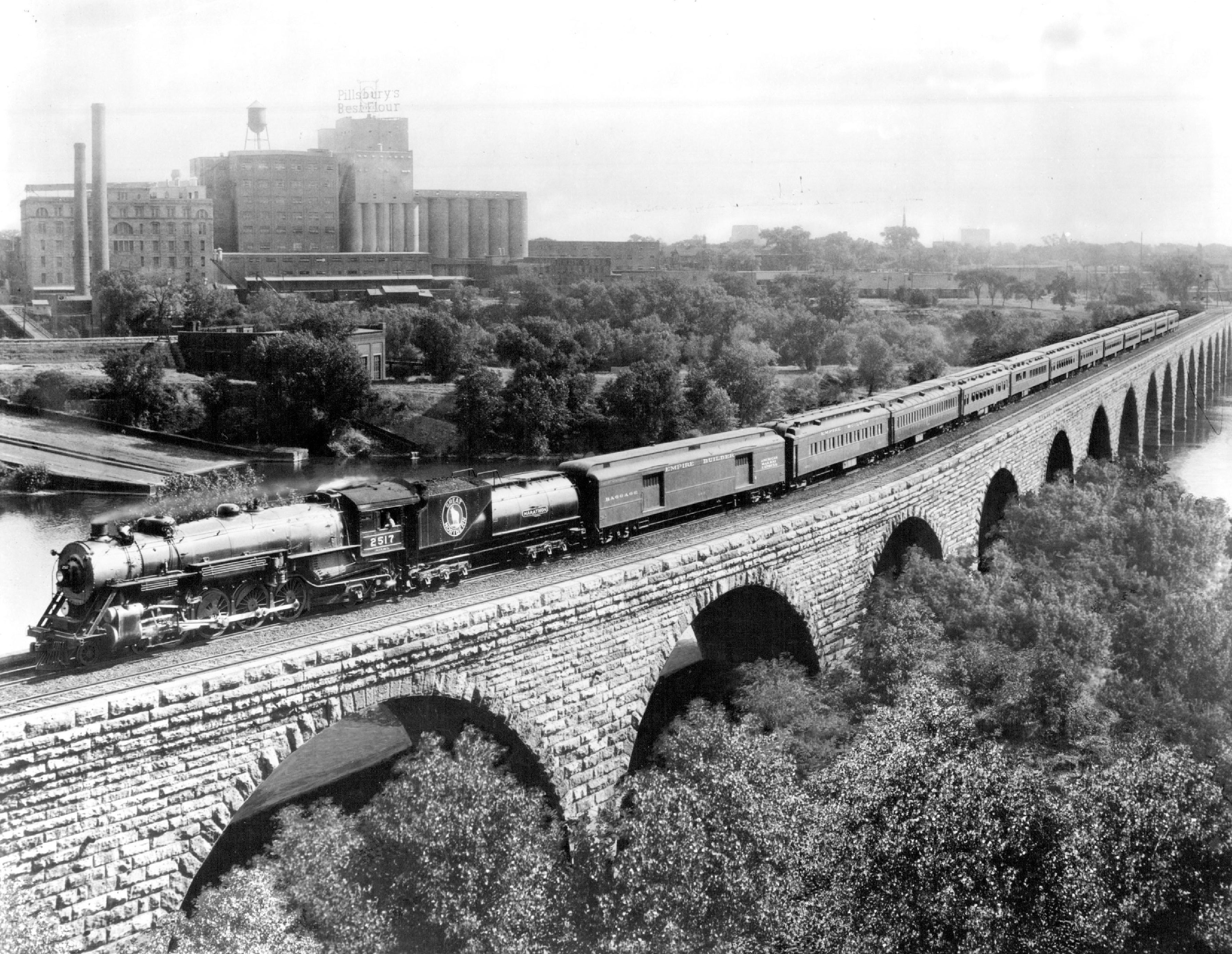
- GN 2517 with the Empire Builder on the Stone Arch Bridge, Minneapolis, c. 1929.
Type and origin
- Power type: Steam
- Builder: Baldwin Locomotive Works
- Serial number: 57000-57002, 57084-57085, 57182-57190, 57256-57258, 57339, 57012, 57253, 57341-57347
- Build date: September–October 1923
- Total produced: 28
Specifications
- Configuration
  - Whyte: 4-8-2
  - UIC: 2′D2′ h1
- Gauge: 4 ft 8 1/2 in (1,435 mm) standard gauge
- Leading dia.: 33 in (838 mm)
- Driver dia.: 73 in (1,854 mm)
- Trailing dia.: 45 in (1,143 mm)
- Tender wheels: 33 in (838 mm)
- Wheelbase: 83.04 ft (25,311 mm)
- Length: 102 ft 3 7/8 in (31.19 m)
- Height: 15 ft 9 7/8 in (4.82 m)
- Axle load: 66,250 lb (30,050 kilograms; 30.05 metric tons)
- Adhesive weight: 265,000 lb (120,000 kilograms; 120 metric tons)
- Loco weight: 388,700 lb (176,300 kilograms; 176.3 metric tons)
- Tender weight: 305,950 lb (138,780 kilograms; 138.78 metric tons)
- Total weight: 694,650 lb (315,090 kilograms; 315.09 metric tons)
- Tender type: Vanderbilt
- Fuel type: Fuel oil
- Fuel capacity: 5,800 US gal (22,000 L; 4,800 imp gal) oil
- Water cap.: 15,000 US gal (57,000 L; 12,000 imp gal)
- Firebox
  - Grate area: 88 sq ft (8.2 m^{2})
- Boiler: 94 in (2,400 mm)
- Boiler pressure: 210 lbf/in^{2} (1.45 MPa) (as built 200 lbf/in^{2} (1.38 MPa))
- Heating surface
  - Firebox: 400 sq ft (37 m^{2})
- Cylinders: Two
- Cylinder size: 29 in × 28 in (737 mm × 711 mm)
Performance figures
- Maximum speed: 50 mph (80 km/h) (limited)
- Tractive effort: 57,580 lbf (256.13 kN) (as built 54,838 lbf (243.9 kN)); 69,780 lbf (310,400 N) with booster
- Factor of adh.: 4.13 (as built 4.34)
Career
- Operators: Great Northern
- Class: P-2
- Numbers: 2500–2527
- Retired: 1955-1958
- Preserved: Two (Nos. 2507 and 2523)
- Disposition: Great Northern 2507 on display in Wishram, Washington, Great Northern 2523 on display in Willmar, Minnesota, remainder scrapped

The Great Northern P-2 was a class of 28 4-8-2 "Mountain" type steam locomotives built by the Baldwin Locomotive Works in 1923 and operated by the Great Northern Railway until the late 1950s.

The locomotives were built as passenger locomotives and the class had the honor of pulling the first Empire Builder train.

Today, two P-2s survive, No. 2507 is on display in Wishram, WA and No. 2523 is on display in Willmar, MN.

== History ==
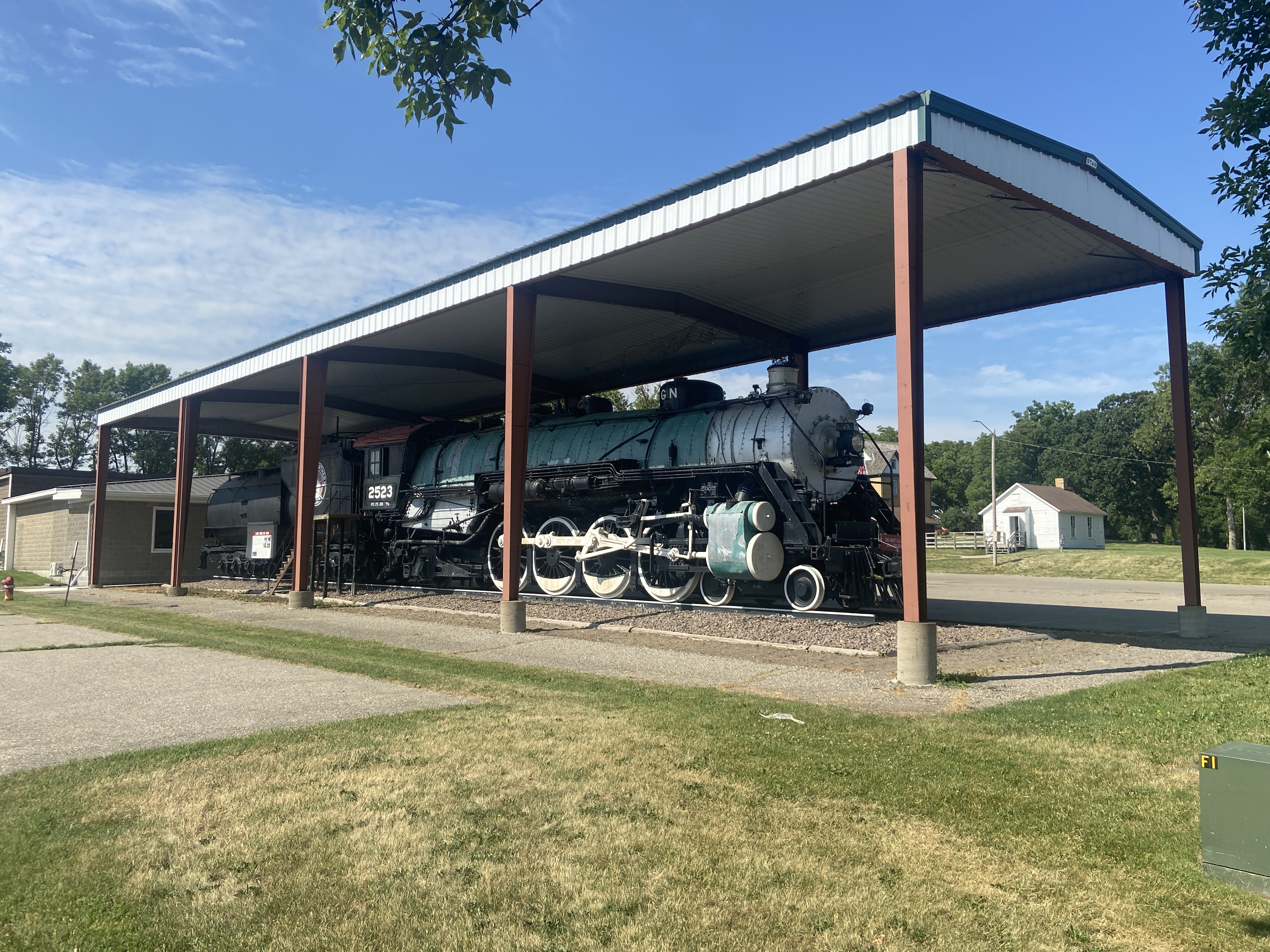
GN 2523 on display in Willmar, MN

=== Design ===
Built as passenger locomotives in 1923, they were used to haul passenger trains throughout the Great Northern. They were built to speed up passenger trains on the mainline and have replaced the earlier P-1 Class of "Mountains" of 1914, as they were deemed too slow for passenger service. While most Great Northern steam locomotives had a Belpaire firebox, the P-2s had a radial stay firebox. The first 18 were delivered as oil burners and the last 10 were delivered as coal burners. In service, they were limited to 50 mph, but managed up to 4,800 miles a month and were rated at 10-12 heavyweight passenger cars up the 1.8% Walton Hill at 18 mph. Helper service is provided up the 1.65% grade outside of the St. Paul Union Depot if trains consisted of 10 or more cars. Later in their service life, their boiler pressure was increased from 200 psi to 210 psi, increasing their tractive effort from 54,838 to 57,580 lbs. About half of the class received roller bearings. The P-2s were deemed as excellent passenger locomotives.

=== Revenue service ===
The locomotives pulled passenger trains such as the Empire Builder and Oriental Limited and was the first to pull the former. While their performance in passenger service was excellent, they were replaced by the S-2 Class of Northerns in Empire Builder service, regulating them to other passenger trains and freight trains. As the Great Northern dieselized, retirement of the P-2s began in April 1955 and by April 1958, all have been retired.

=== Accidents and incidents ===
- No. 2507, while pulling train #27, the Fast Mail, hit a landslide near Picnic Point, south of Mukilteo, Washington, in the pre-dawn hours of February 18, 1948. The engineer and fireman survived, but were both injured when the slide rolled the engine, tender and a baggage car off the track and went over the rock sea wall into Puget Sound. The locomotive was eventually repaired and returned to service.

== Preservation ==
Two P-2s survived into preservation.

- Great Northern 2507 was retired in December 1957, eventually sold to the Spokane, Portland and Seattle for display at Maryhill, WA and dedicated on September 3, 1966. It was later moved to Pasco, WA for restoration, but it was unsuccessful. The locomotive was moved again in 2003 to the depot in Wishram, WA, where it resides.
- Great Northern 2523 was retired in April 1958 and donated to the city of Willmar, MN on October 7, 1965. It is currently displayed at the Kandiyohi County Historical Society.

== Roster ==
Number	Baldwin serial number	Date built	Disposition	Notes
2500	57000	September 1923	Sold for scrap May 9, 1955.	
2501	57001	September 1923	Retired April 1955.	
2502	57002	September 1923	Sold for scrap April 19, 1956.	
2503	57084	October 1923	Sold for scrap May 9, 1955.	
2504	57085	October 1923	Sold for scrap May 9, 1955.	
2505	57182	October 1923	Retired December 1957.	Received booster that added 12,200 lbs of tractive effort in the late 1940s.
2506	57183	October 1923	Sold for scrap October 7, 1955.	Received booster that added 12,200 lbs of tractive effort in the late 1940s.
2507	57184	October 1923	Retired December 1957, sold to the Spokane, Portland and Seattle Railway. Moved to Pasco, Washington for restoration attempt. It was unsuccessful and moved to Wishram, Washington in July 2003 where it still resides.	
2508	57185	October 1923	Sold for scrap October 7, 1955.	
2509	57186	October 1923	Sold for scrap October 7, 1955.	
2510	57187	October 1923	Retired December 1957.	
2511	57188	October 1923	Retired December 1957.	
2512	57189	October 1923	Sold for scrap October 7, 1955.	
2513	57190	October 1923	Retired April 1958.	
2514	57256	October 1923	Retired March 1958.	
2515	57257	October 1923	Sold for scrap October 7, 1955.	
2516	57258	October 1923	Sold for scrap October 7, 1955.	
2517	57339	October 1923	Sold for scrap April 19, 1956.	
2518	57012	October 1923	Scrapped May 9, 1955.	
2519	57012	October 1923	Sold for scrap April 19, 1956.	
2520	57340	October 1923	Retired December 1957.	
2521	57341	October 1923	Retired December 1957.	Last GN steam locomotive to run out of Seattle.
2522	57342	October 1923	Sold for scrap August 16, 1956.	
2523	57343	October 1923	Retired April 1958, donated to the city of Willmar, Minnesota on October 7, 1965, currently on display at the Kandiyohi County Historical Society in Willmar, MN.	
2524	57344	October 1923	Retired April 1958.	
2525	57345	October 1923	Retired December 1957.	
2526	57346	October 1923	Sold for scrap May 9, 1955.	
2527	57347	October 1923	Sold for scrap April 19, 1956.	

== See also ==
- Great Northern P-1
- Great Northern S-2
