= Pennsylvania Railroad class L1 =

Class of 574 American 2-8-2 locomotives

Pennsylvania Railroad L1 class
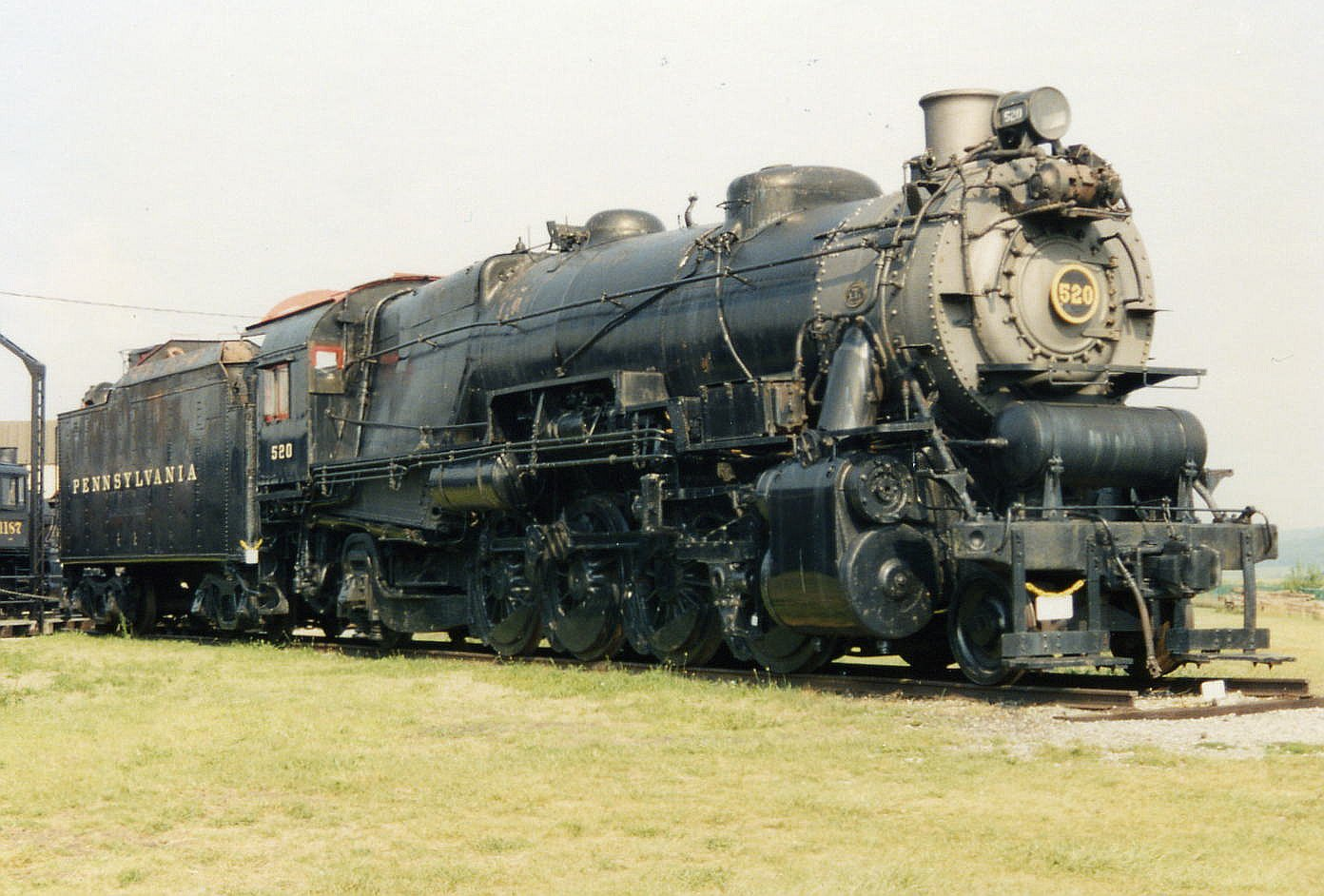
- Preserved 520 at the Railroad Museum of Pennsylvania.
Type and origin
- Power type: Steam
- Designer: J. T. Wallace, Alfred W. Gibbs, Axel Vogt
- Builder: PRR Juniata Shops (344), Baldwin Locomotive Works (205), Lima Locomotive Works (25)
- Build date: 1914–1919
- Total produced: 574
Specifications
- Configuration
  - Whyte: 2-8-2
  - UIC: 1'D1'
- Gauge: Standard
- Leading dia.: 33 in (0.84 m)
- Driver dia.: 62 in (1.57 m)
- Trailing dia.: 50 in (1.27 m)
- Wheelbase: 36 ft 4.5 in (11.087 m) (locomotive)
- Length: 82 ft 0.25 in (25.0 m) (including 90F75 tender)
- Height: 15 ft 0 in (4.57 m)
- Boiler pressure: 205 psi (1.41 MPa)
- Cylinders: 2
- Cylinder size: 27 in × 30 in (690 mm × 760 mm)
Performance figures
- Maximum speed: 65 mph (105 km/h)
- Power output: New: 2,712 hp (2,022 kW) Later: 3,700 hp (2,800 kW)
- Tractive effort: 61,465 lbf (273.41 kN)
- Factor of adh.: 3.78
Career
- Operators: PRR
- Nicknames: Lollipops
- Retired: 1948-1960
- Disposition: One preserved, remainder scrapped

Pennsylvania Railroad Class L1s were 2-8-2 steam locomotives, similar to the later USRA Heavy Mikados, that were used on the Pennsylvania Railroad during the early twentieth century. These 574 locomotives were manufactured between 1914 and 1919 by the railroad's own Juniata Shops (344 examples) as well as the Baldwin Locomotive Works (205) and the Lima Locomotive Works (25).

It was the largest class of 2-8-2 locomotives anywhere, although other railroads had more Mikados in total.

== History and notable features ==
The L1s shared the boiler and many other components with the K4s 4-6-2 "Pacific" type, giving a total of 425 locomotives with many standard parts.

Although the L1s type was quite successful, it was very much eclipsed in PRR service by the larger and more powerful I1s/I1sa 2-10-0 "Decapods", which arrived in service only two years after the L1s and were very suited to the PRR's mountain grades and heavy coal and mineral trains, and by the 1923 introduction of the M1 4-8-2 "Mountains" which took on the best high-speed freight runs. Large numbers of the class were stored out of service during the Great Depression, only to return to service during World War II.

== Design ==
The L1s design was state-of-the-art for its time and comparable with the best being produced for any other road. In fact, the specifications of the L1s and the Santa Fe's similar 3160 class locomotives were the basis for the USRA's successful Heavy Mikado standard design, which was built to the total of 957 locomotives.

As built, however, the class was lacking much in the way of modern appliances due to the PRR's conservatism; features missing included a mechanical stoker, power reverse, and a feedwater heater, although most of the class were later given a stoker and all received power reverse.

== Modifications in service ==
The class remained largely as built until the 1920s. At that time, piston and valve tailrods were removed, wooden pilot beams were replaced with steel, footboard pilots replaced the pointed passenger-style previously fitted, and oil-burning headlights were replaced by electric lights.

Power reverse gear was fitted slowly to the entire class per an order of the Interstate Commerce Commission, the task being complete by the early 1930s. Fitting this gear required moving the air tanks from the right-hand side of the boiler to the front deck, thus providing an easy visual indication of the modification. The tanks on the left-hand side of the boiler remained in their original location.

Most (but by no means all) of the class were eventually fitted with mechanical stokers; by 1947, 512 locomotives were stoker-equipped, 39 still hand-fired, and the remaining ten were oil-fired, the latter being an experiment tried during the coal-miners' strikes of that period.

The PRR experimented with booster engines on the L1s class as it did with the K4s Pacifics, but apart from a few test installations never proceeded with this modification. Also not generally fitted was the PRR's trainphone system, although early installations were tested on at least one L1s.

A more serious modification was performed to L1s #2861, which was fitted with an experimental Emerson water-tube firebox at the Baltimore and Ohio Railroad's Mount Clare Shops.

Like most PRR locomotives, class L1s was subject to the post-World War II swapping of the locations of the headlamp and turbo-generator. The headlamp was placed in front of the stack on top of the smokebox, in the generator's former location, while the turbogenerator was mounted on the upper smokebox front in the location formerly occupied by the headlamp. This was for ease of maintenance; the turbogenerator needed work much more frequently than the headlight, so it was given the location with easier access.

Many of the class were fitted with cab signal equipment, the electronics for which were largely contained in a wood box affixed to the right-hand side running board in front of the reversing gear and aft of the smokebox.

== Sale to other railroads ==
Some L1s locomotives were sold by the PRR to other railroads. Four were sold to the Lehigh and New England Railroad in 1941; two were sold to the Cambria and Indiana Railroad in the same year. Three locomotives were sold to the Atchison, Topeka and Santa Fe Railway in 1945. In 1948, two locomotives were sold to the Interstate Railroad and two to the Detroit, Toledo and Ironton Railroad.

== Accidents and incidents ==
520 was built by the Baldwin Locomotive Works in December 1916. While pulling freight from Altoona, Pennsylvania, to Conway, Pennsylvania, on November 14, 1942, during World War 2 the boiler on 520 exploded near Cresson. The explosion killed both the engineer and the brakeman, injured the fireman and conductor, and shattered windows on a nearby house. Two occupants of the house were also injured by scalding water and flying embers, which also set a rug on fire. The force of the blast derailed the tender and six tank cars. 520 was eventually repaired and placed back into service.

== Preservation ==
520, which remained in service until almost the end of steam operations, hauled one of the last steam-powered passenger trains on the PRR: a railfan special between Enola Yard and Northumberland, Pennsylvania. Shortly after that service it was added to the PRR's historic locomotive collection in the Northumberland roundhouse, and followed most of that collection to the Railroad Museum of Pennsylvania where it remains today a static exhibit. It was added to the National Register of Historic Places in 1979.

== Models ==
In HO scale, hundreds of hand-made brass models of the L1s were supplied from 1965 to 1976 by United (Pacific Fast Mail) of Japan, and also by Key Imports of Korea in 1978.

Broadway Limited Imports offered a post–war L1s in HO scale and a Pennsylvania Railroad USRA Light Mikado in N scale.

Bowser Manufacturing offered a metal kit, now out of production [originally offered by Penn Line Manufacturing], of the L1s locomotive in HO scale. In N scale, GHQ offered a kit to convert a Kato USRA Light Mikado into a L1s.

LGB produced a USRA Light Mikado in G scale in multiple fallen flag railroad names including product number 21872, Pennsylvania Railroad No. 2809.
