= Pennsylvania Railroad 520 =

Preserved PRR L1s class 2-8-2 locomotive

Coordinates: 39°58′56″N 76°9′40″W

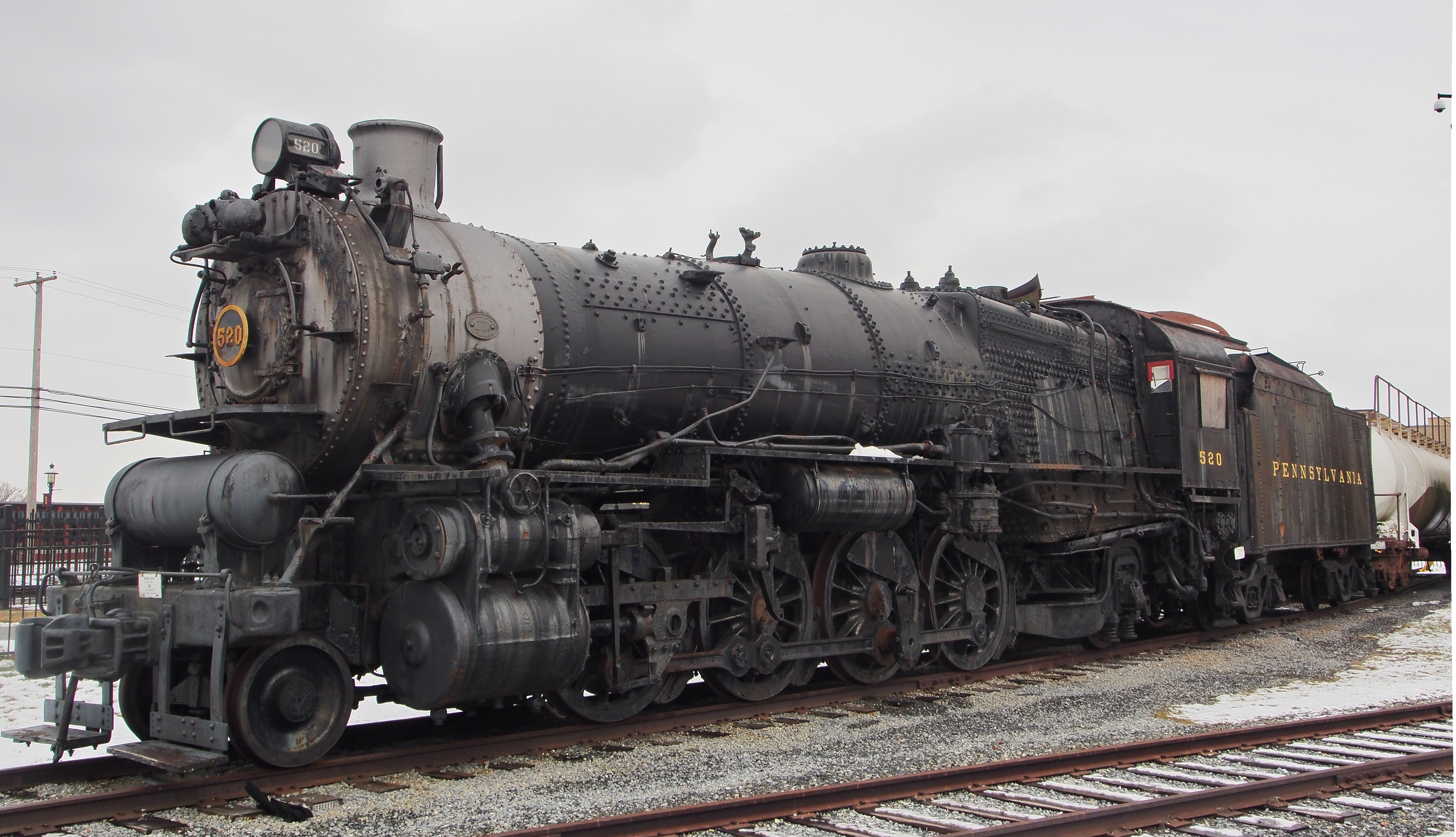
- Pennsylvania Railroad No. 520 on display at the Railroad Museum of Pennsylvania in early 2015
Type and origin
- Power type: Steam
- Builder: Baldwin Locomotive Works
- Serial number: 44565
- Build date: December 1916
Specifications
- Configuration
  - Whyte: 2-8-2
- Gauge: 4 ft 8 1/2 in (1,435 mm)
- Driver dia.: 62 in (1,575 mm)
- Length: 82 ft 1/4 in (25.0 m)
- Adhesive weight: 232,500 lb (105,500 kg)
- Loco weight: 324,700 lb (147,300 kg)
- Tender weight: 447,300 lb (202,900 kg)
- Total weight: 772,000 lb (350,000 kg)
- Tender type: 110-P-75
- Fuel type: Coal
- Fuel capacity: 18.5 tonnes (41,000 lb)
- Water cap.: 11,980 US gallons (45,300 L)
- Boiler pressure: 205 psi (1,413 kPa)
- Heating surface
  - Firebox: 305 sq ft (28 m^{2})
- Superheater
  - Heating area: 943 sq ft (88 m^{2})
- Cylinders: Two, outside
- Valve gear: Walschaerts
- Valve type: Piston valves
- Loco brake: Air
- Train brakes: Air
- Couplers: Knuckle
Performance figures
- Tractive effort: 61,465 lbf (273 kN)
- Factor of adh.: 3.78
Career
- Operators: Pennsylvania Railroad
- Class: L1s
- Numbers: PRR 520
- Retired: October 20, 1957
- Current owner: Pennsylvania Historical and Museum Commission
- Disposition: On static display
U.S. National Register of Historic Places
- Official name: Mikado Freight Locomotive No. 520
- Designated: December 17, 1979
- Part of: Pennsylvania Railroad Rolling Stock Thematic Resource
- Reference no.: 79002269

Pennsylvania Railroad 520 is a preserved L1s-class 2-8-2 "Mikado" steam locomotive. It was built in December 1916 by the Baldwin Locomotive Works for the Pennsylvania Railroad for hauling freight. In 1942, the locomotive was involved in a boiler explosion incident that required construction of a new, replacement boiler. After being retired on October 20, 1957, the locomotive was preserved and placed on display at the Railroad Museum of Pennsylvania in Strasburg, Pennsylvania. The locomotive and was listed on the National Register of Historic Places on December 17, 1979.

== Background ==
The L1s is a class of 2-8-2 steam locomotives that was developed in 1914 to replace the H9s-class. The L1s used boilers identical to the ones eventually used for Pennsylvania Railroad's famed K4s-class steam locomotives. Most L1s locomotives were moved to other duties when the I1s was introduced in 1924.

== History ==
No. 520 was built by the Baldwin Locomotive Works in December 1916. While pulling a freight train from Altoona, Pennsylvania, to Conway, Pennsylvania, on November 14, 1942, during World War 2 the boiler on No. 520 exploded near Cresson. The explosion killed both the engineer and the brakeman, injured the fireman and conductor, and shattered windows on a nearby house. Two occupants of the house were also injured by scalding water and flying embers, which also set a rug on fire. The force of the blast derailed the tender and six tank cars. No. 520 was eventually repaired and placed back into service.

On October 20, 1957, No. 520 pulled a "railfan special" out of Baltimore, Maryland, from Enola to Northumberland, Pennsylvania. After completing a round trip back to Enola, it was retired to the Pennsylvania Railroad's collection of historical locomotives. No. 520 was donated to the Pennsylvania Historical and Museum Commission on December 17, 1979 by the Pennsylvania Railroad's successor Penn Central. It was also listed on the National Register of Historic Places on December 17, 1979.

== See also ==
- List of boiler explosions
- National Register of Historic Places listings in Lancaster County, Pennsylvania

== Sources ==
- Hart, George M; Zacher, Susan M (March 1978). "Pennsylvania Railroad Rolling Stock Thematic Resource" (PDF). National Register of Historic Places Inventory—Nomination Form. National Park Service.
- Stauffer, Alvin W (1962). Pennsy Power. Carrollton, Ohio: Standard Print & Publishing. LCCN 62020878.
