= Great Northern 2507 =

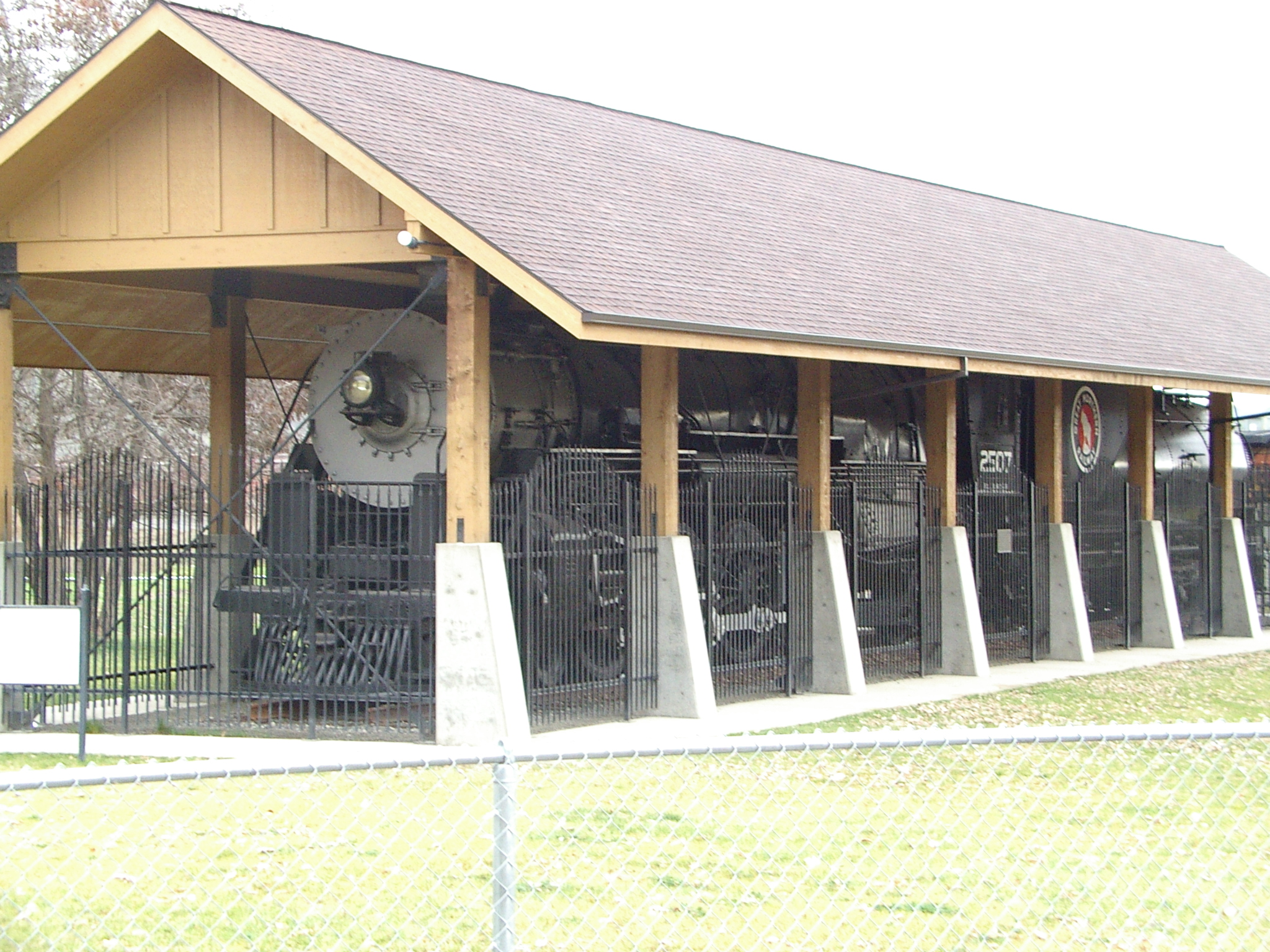
- Great Northern 2507, photographed in 2006 in Wishram, Washington.
Type and origin
- Power type: Steam
- Builder: Baldwin Locomotive Works
- Serial number: 57184
- Model: Baldwin 14-52-1/4-E, (#8)
- Build date: October 1923
Specifications
- Configuration
  - Whyte: 4-8-2
  - UIC: 2′D2′ h1
- Gauge: 4 ft 8 1/2 in (1,435 mm) standard gauge
- Leading dia.: 33 in (838 mm)
- Driver dia.: 73 in (1,854 mm)
- Trailing dia.: 45 in (1,143 mm)
- Tender wheels: 33 in (838 mm)
- Wheelbase: 83.04 ft (25,311 mm)
- Axle load: 66,250 lb (30,050 kilograms; 30.05 metric tons)
- Adhesive weight: 265,000 lb (120,000 kilograms; 120 metric tons)
- Loco weight: 388,700 lb (176,300 kilograms; 176.3 metric tons)
- Tender weight: 305,950 lb (138,780 kilograms; 138.78 metric tons)
- Total weight: 694,650 lb (315,090 kilograms; 315.09 metric tons)
- Tender type: Vanderbilt
- Fuel type: Fuel oil
- Fuel capacity: 5,800 US gal (22,000 L; 4,800 imp gal) oil
- Water cap.: 15,000 US gal (57,000 L; 12,000 imp gal)
- Firebox
  - Grate area: 88 sq ft (8.2 m^{2})
- Boiler: 84 in (2,100 mm)
- Boiler pressure: 210 lbf/in^{2} (1.45 MPa) (as built 200 lbf/in^{2} (1.38 MPa))
- Heating surface
  - Firebox: 400 sq ft (37 m^{2})
- Cylinders: Two
- Cylinder size: 29 in × 28 in (737 mm × 711 mm)
- Valve gear: Walschaert
Performance figures
- Maximum speed: 50 mph (80 km/h) (limited)
- Tractive effort: 57,580 lbf (256.13 kN) (as built 54,838 lbf (243.9 kN))
- Factor of adh.: 4.13 (as built 4.34)
Career
- Operators: Great Northern
- Class: P-2
- Number in class: 8th of 28
- Numbers: GN 2507
- Retired: December 1957
- Disposition: On display at the Wishram depot in Wishram, Washington

Great Northern 2507 (GN 2507) is a 4-8-2 "Mountain" type steam locomotive, a member of the P-2 class. Built for passenger service, the locomotive was assigned to pull the Great Northern's mainline passenger trains such as the Empire Builder and Oriental Limited, until being retired in December 1957 and sold to Spokane, Portland and Seattle Railway. GN 2507 is one of only two surviving examples of a P-2 class locomotive and, since 2003, has been on display at Wishram station in Wishram, Washington.

== Service history ==
GN 2507 was built by the Baldwin Locomotive Works in Philadelphia, Pennsylvania in 1923. One of 28 locomotives in its class, it was delivered to the Great Northern Railway on 2 November 1923. Purchased with the intention of passenger service, GN 2507 was used to pull the Oriental Limited and Empire Builder passenger services.

== 1948 accident ==
On 18 February 1948, while operating as a mail train, GN 2507 struck a landslide 2.5 miles (4 km) south of Mukilteo, Washington. The locomotive and a baggage car went over the rock sea wall into Puget Sound and two unoccupied coaches were derailed. An engineer, 60-year-old Albert White of Everett, Washington, and a fireman, 28-year-old W.P. Murphy of Seattle, Washington, were both injured in the derailment but survived. White suffered from back and internal injuries, while Murphy lost one of his thumbs. The locomotive was eventually repaired and returned to service.

== Preservation ==
GN 2507 was retired in December 1957 and kept in storage for several years in Minnesota. It was sold to the Spokane, Portland and Seattle Railway (SP&S), who had promised a steam locomotive to the county of Klickitat, Washington to display at Maryhill State Park. The locomotive was towed to Vancouver, Washington, and repainted with SP&S lettering, even though it had never been operated by that railway. It was formally donated to Klickitat County on 3 September 1966, and dedicated "to the days of steam locomotives and to the men who operated them." US Rep Catherine Dean May played an important role in securing the locomotive for the county, and gave a speech on the day of the handover.

In the early 1990s, the locomotive was leased to the Northwest Railway & Locomotive Preservation Association, who planned to restore the engine to service. In October 1992, it was repainted to restore its original Great Northern logo. On 29 January 1994, the locomotive was transported on a river barge to Pasco, Washington for restoration; however, the planned restoration never took place. GN 2507 was subsequently leased to the Washington State Railroads Historical Society, but little restoration work was undertaken.

On 7 July 2003, the locomotive was pulled by a BNSF locomotive to its current home in Wishram, Washington, about 126 miles (203 km) away. During this journey, the locomotive was restricted to 20 mph (32 kph) to prevent damage to its bearings. A new paint job, costing about US$70,000, returned the locomotive to its 1950s all-black appearance. The locomotive is now displayed near Wishram station, at a one-acre site built by Klickitat County for nearly $US300,000. GN 2507 is one of only two preserved P-2 class locomotives – along with Great Northern 2523, which is on display in Willmar, Minnesota.
