= Oregon Trunk Rail Bridge =

Railway bridge in the United States

Oregon Trunk Bridge
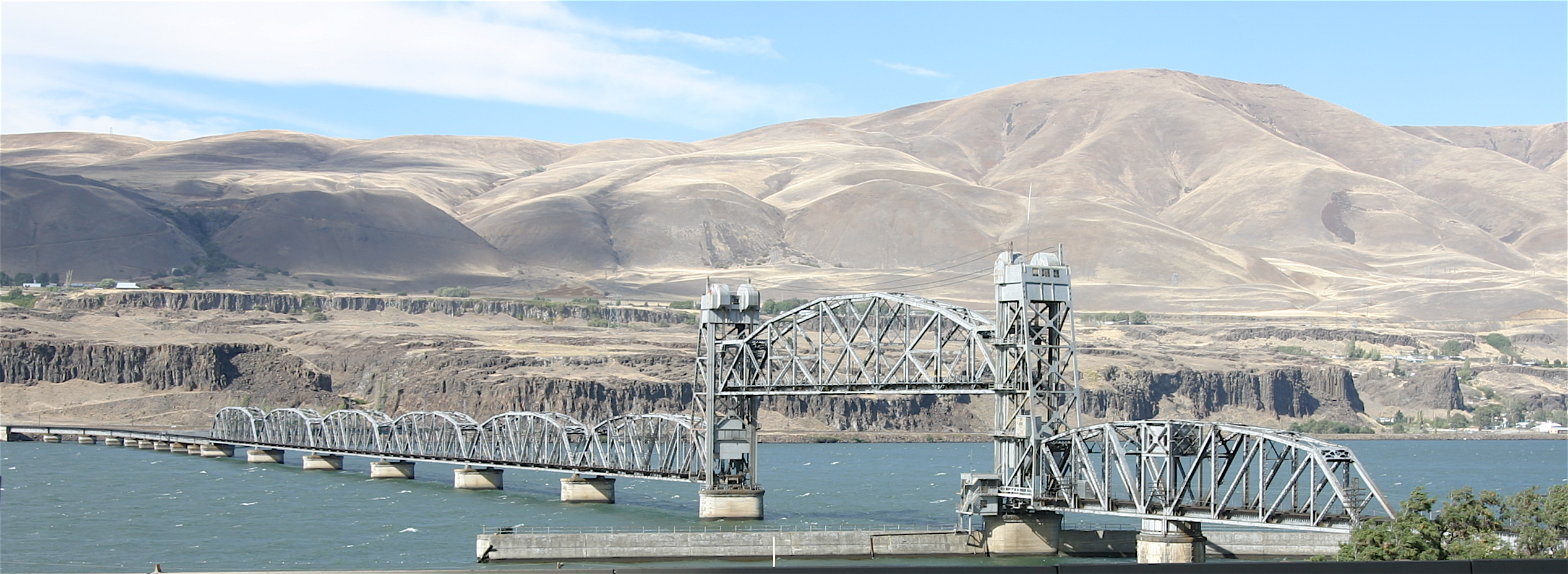
- Viewed from the southwest
- Coordinates: 45°38′56.2″N 120°58′54.3″W
- Carries: 1 railroad track of BNSF Railway
- Crosses: Columbia River
- Locale: Oregon Trunk Junction, Oregon (in Wasco County); Wishram, Washington

Characteristics
- Design: Pratt truss with swing span (inoperable) and vertical-lift span (operational)
- Total length: approx. 2,400–3,350 feet
- Longest span: approx. 300 feet

History
- Opened: January 1912

Location
- Interactive map of Oregon Trunk Bridge

The Oregon Trunk Rail Bridge or Celilo Bridge is a single-track railroad bridge opened in 1912 over the Columbia River in the Pacific Northwest of the United States. It consists of eight steel truss spans and several deck girder spans, and since 1957 it has included a vertical-lift section. The bridge was designed by engineer Ralph Modjeski and erected by the Missouri Valley Bridge & Iron Co., of Leavenworth, Kansas.

It is part of the Wishram, Washington to Bend, Oregon line of the BNSF Railway (formerly the Oregon Trunk Line of the Spokane, Portland and Seattle Railway). The bridge is downstream of the site of Celilo Falls, now submerged by water impounded by The Dalles Dam. The Celilo Canal passed beneath the southernmost span, which was a swing span. Completion of The Dalles Dam in 1957 inundated the canal. Over a period of several months starting in October 1956, the bridge was raised by up to 5 feet (1.5 m) over its entire length, and the truss span to the north of the swing span was modified to a vertical-lift-type span for river navigation. The new lift span's first complete raising and lowering took place on June 21, 1957, and the bridge reopened to rail traffic the following day. The swing span, to the south of the lift span, remains in place, but it ceased to be used after the lift span was installed. It was "permanently locked in place" in October 1956, for the start of work to modify the bridge.

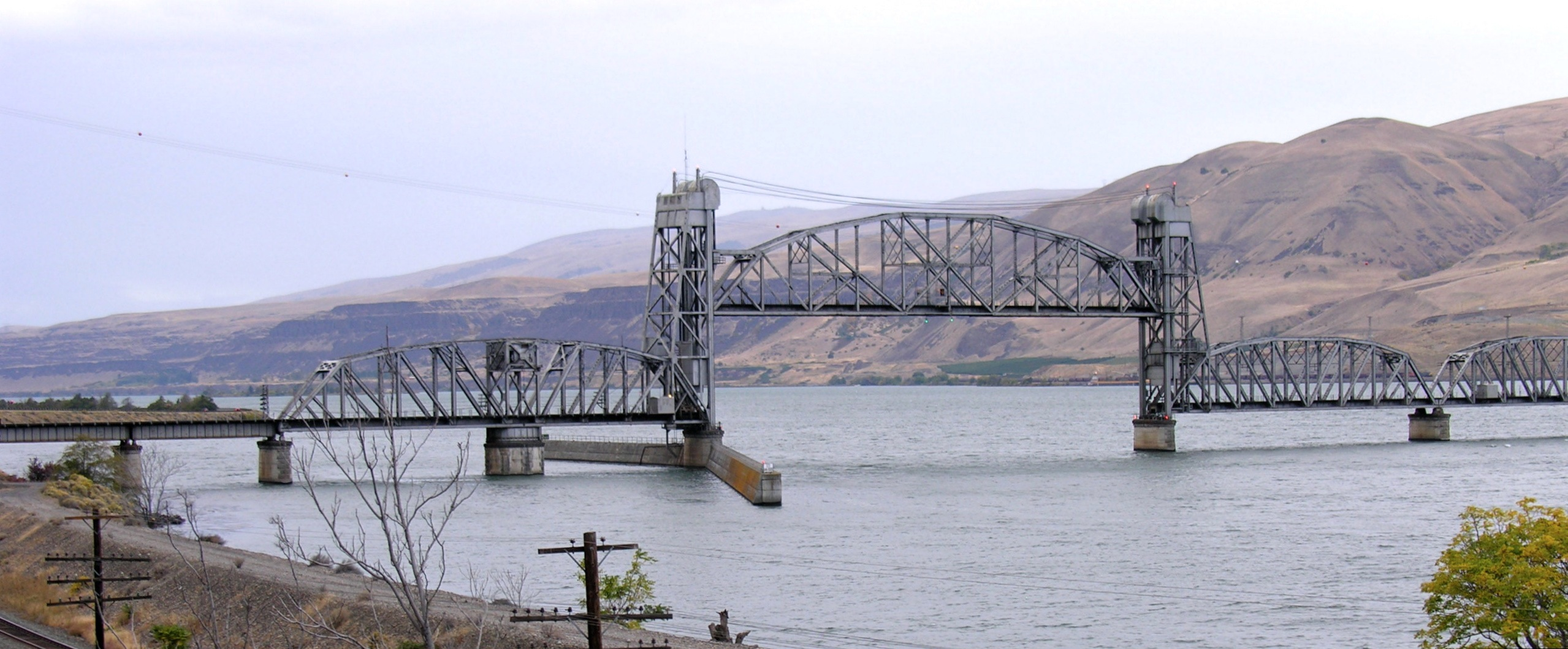
View from the southeast, showing both the original swing span (at left) and the vertical-lift span added in 1957

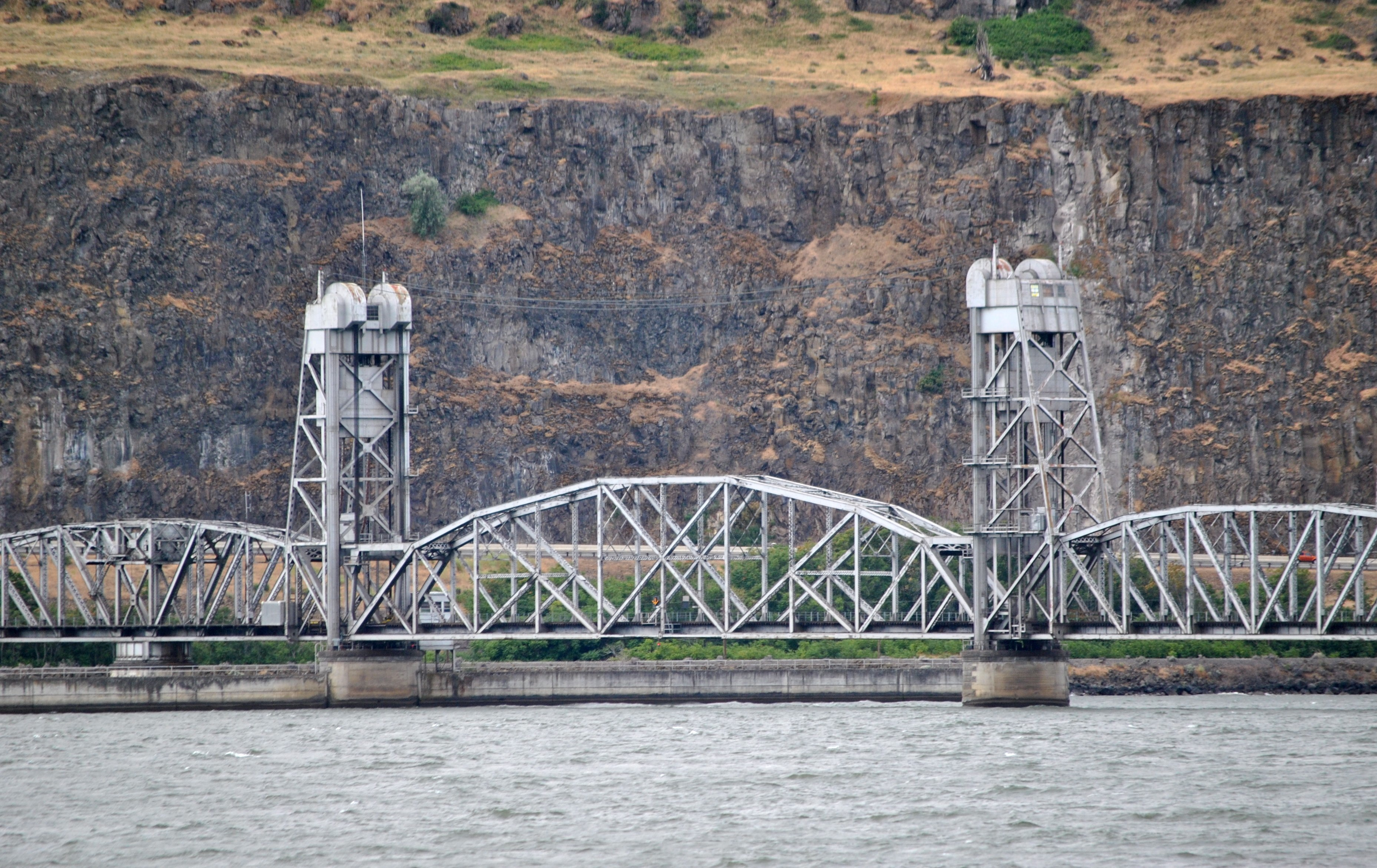
The lift span in the lowered position, the less common position

All of the bridge's piers rest on rocks that were normally exposed during low water periods. During periods of high water, this stretch of the Columbia River became raging rapids, so the piers were built during low water. The north end of the bridge is a wye, where the rail line from Bend meets the BNSF Portland to Pasco mainline. On the south end of the bridge, the line crosses over and interchanges with the Union Pacific mainline. Excluding the two branches at the north end, the bridge is 2,396 feet (730 m) long. The wye's east leg is 952 feet (290 m) long, and its west leg 849 feet (259 m) long.

When built, the bridge's longest span was a 316-foot (96 m) fixed span located just to the north of the swing span; that section was later replaced by a lift span.

== See also ==
- List of crossings of the Columbia River
- Yancopin Bridge – bridge in which a swing span was added to replace a vertical-lift span
