= USRA Heavy Mikado =

Class of American two-cylinder locomotives

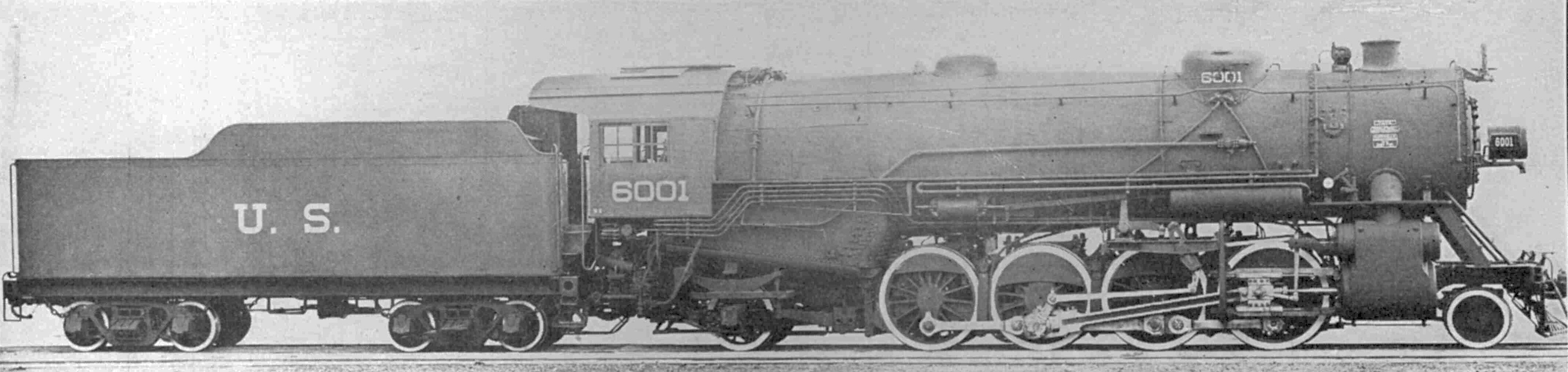
Type and origin
- Power type: Steam
- Builder: ALCO, Baldwin, Lima
- Build date: 1918–1944
- Total produced: 233 originals, plus 724 copies
Specifications
- Configuration
  - Whyte: 2-8-2
  - UIC: 1′D1′ h2
- Driver dia.: 63 in (1,600 mm)
- Wheelbase: locomotive: 36 ft 1 in (11.00 m)
- Fuel type: Coal
- Fuel capacity: 14.5 t (14.3 long tons; 16.0 short tons)
- Firebox
  - Grate area: 70.8 sq ft (6.58 m^{2})
- Boiler pressure: 190 psi (1.31 MPa)
- Superheater
  - Heating area: 92.25 m^{2} (993.0 sq ft)
- Cylinders: Two, outside
- Cylinder size: 27 in × 32 in (690 mm × 810 mm)
- Valve gear: Walschaerts
- Loco brake: Westinghouse air brake
- Train brakes: Westinghouse air brake
Performance figures
- Power output: 3,194 hp (2,382 kW)
- Tractive effort: 60,000 lbf (270 kN)
Career
- Scrapped: 1938-1961
- Disposition: All scrapped

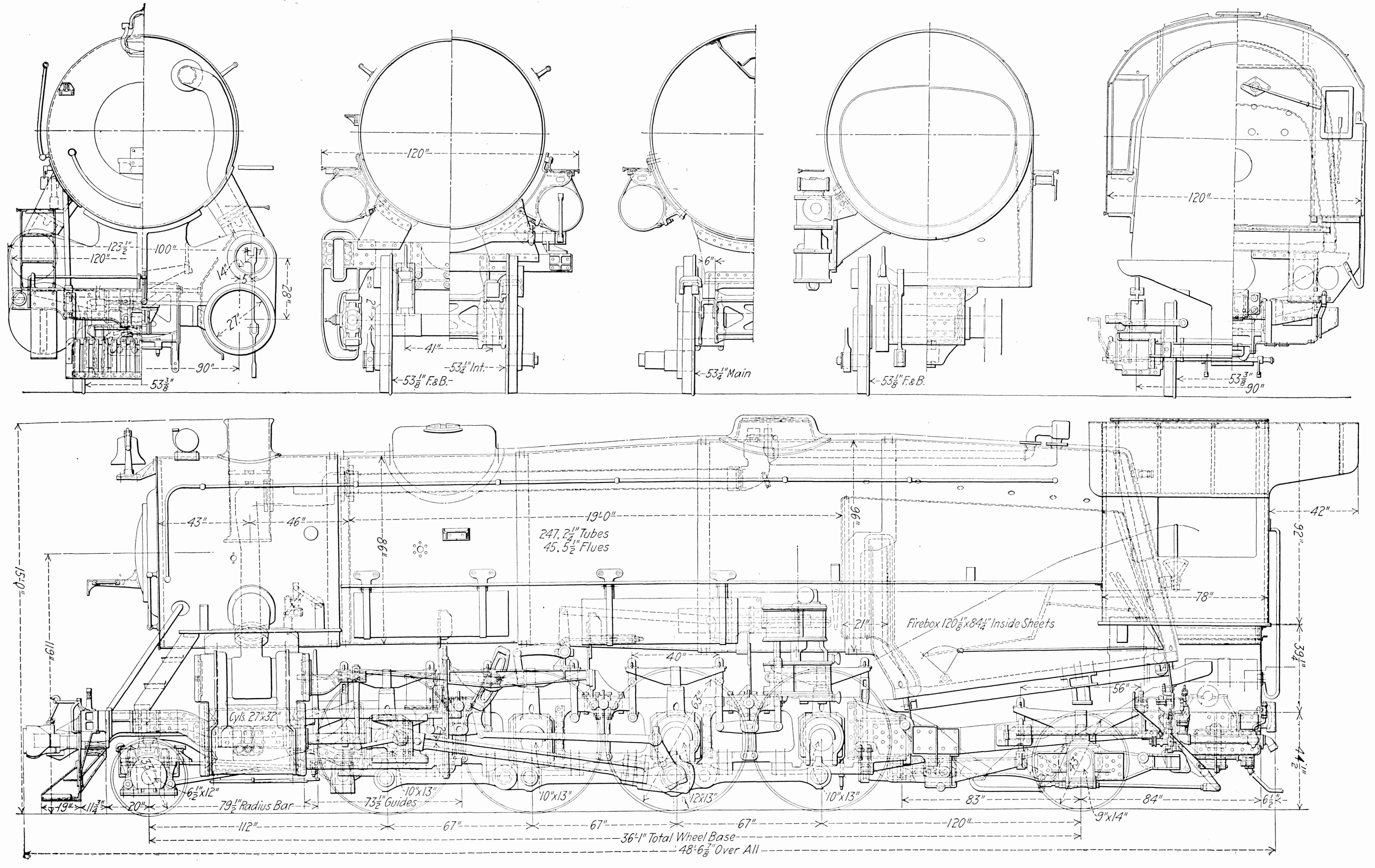
General arrangement drawing.

The USRA Heavy Mikado was a USRA standard class of steam locomotive designed under the control of the United States Railroad Administration (USRA), the nationalized railroad system in the United States during World War I. These locomotives were of 2-8-2 wheel arrangement in the Whyte notation, or 1′D1′ in UIC classification. A total of 233 locomotives were built to this plan for the USRA; postwar, it became a de facto standard design, which was built to the total of 957 locomotives including the USRA originals and all subsequent copies.

Heavy Mikado used the same running gear as the USRA Light Mikado but were built to a higher axle load, larger cylinders and a much larger boiler for more power and steam-generating ability. Many aspects of the PRR L1s class were carried over to the Heavy Mikado, although not that locomotive's distinctive Belpaire firebox.

== Original owners ==
=== USRA originals ===
Table of original USRA allocation
| Railroad | Quantity | Class | Road numbers | Notes |
|---|---|---|---|---|
| Central Railroad of New Jersey | 10 | M1s | 850–859 | Built 1918-1925 by ALCO and Baldwin reclassified M63 in 1945. Scrapped between 1947-1955. |
| Chicago, Burlington & Quincy Railroad | 15 | O-4 | 5500–5514 | Built 1919 by Baldwin. Several to Colorado and Southern Railway and Fort Worth and Denver Railroad. Scrapped between 1954-1957. |
| CB&Q affiliate Fort Worth and Denver Railway | 5 | E-4A2 | 451–455 | Built 1919 by Baldwin. Scrapped 1958-1959 |
| Chicago, Milwaukee, St. Paul and Pacific Railroad ("Milwaukee Road") | 100 | L3 | 8600–8699 | Built 1918 ALCO. Renumbered 300–399 (not in order). Scrapped between 1938-1956. |
| Chicago, St. Paul, Minneapolis and Omaha Railway ("Omaha Road") | 4 | J-2 | 422–425 | Built 1919 by ALCO. Scrapped between 1942-1944. |
| El Paso and Southwestern Railroad | 5 | H1s-59 | 363-367 | Built 1918 by Baldwin. 4 to Great Northern Railway #3204–3208 in 1920 Scrapped by Great Northern 1947-1950. Remainder scrapped between 1948-1955 by El Paso and Southwestern Railroad. |
| Elgin, Joliet and Eastern Railway | 5 | AB | 738-742 | Built 1918 by Baldwin. To Western Pacific Railroad in 1920. Scrapped 1939-1941. |
| Erie Railroad | 15 | N-2 | 3200–3214 | Built 1918 by ALCO. Scrapped between 1950-1952. |
| Great Northern Railway | 4 | O-3 | 3145–3148 | Built 1918 by ALCO. Renumbered 3200-3203. Scrapped between 1941-1942. |
| Louisville and Nashville Railroad | 20 | J4 | 1750–1769 | Built 1918 by ALCO. Scrapped between 1943-1945. |
| New York Central Railroad subsidiary Pittsburgh and Lake Erie Railroad | 15 | H-9b, H-9d | 9505–9509, 9510–9519 | Built 1919 by ALCO and Baldwin. Scrapped between 1950-1952. |
| New York Central Railroad subsidiary Pittsburgh, McKeesport and Youghiogheny Railroad | 15 | H-9a, H-9c | 9580–9589, 9590–9594 | Built 1918-1919 by ALCO. Scrapped between 1947-1948. |
| Wheeling and Lake Erie Railway | 20 | M-1 | 6001–6020 | Built 1918. Later to New York, Chicago and St. Louis Railroad ("Nickel Plate Road") #671–690 in 1949. Scrapped between 1950-1953. |
| Total | 233 | | | |

=== Copies ===
Table of copies
| Railroad | Quantity | Class | Road numbers | Notes |
|---|---|---|---|---|
| Central Railroad of New Jersey | 56 | M2s, M2as, M3 | 860–915 | Built 1920-1923 by ALCO. Later reclassified M63 in 1945. Scrapped 1949-1958 |
| Chicago, Indianapolis and Louisville Railroad ("Monon") | 1 | | 530 | Built 1923 ALCO. Scrapped in 1946. |
| Chicago, St. Paul, Minneapolis and Omaha Railway ("Omaha Road") | 6 | J-2 | 426–431 | Built 1919 by ALCO. Scrapped between 1947-1960. |
| Chicago, St. Paul, Minneapolis and Omaha Railway ("Omaha Road") | 8 | J-3 | 432–439 | Built 1926 by ALCO Schenectady. Scrapped between 1949-1961. |
| Louisville and Nashville Railroad | 145 | J-4, J-4A | 1770–1914 | Built 1918-1926 by ALCO. Scrapped between 1945-1960. |
| Missouri Pacific Railroad | 170 | MK-63 | 1401–1570 | Built 1921-1923 by ALCO. Scrapped between 1949-1955. |
| MP subsidiary St. Louis, Brownsville and Mexico Railway | 10 | MK-63 | 1111–1120 | Built 1926 by ALCO-Brooks. Scrapped between 1949-1956. |
| New York, Chicago and St. Louis Railroad ("Nickel Plate Road") | 3 | H-6f | 662-665 | Built 1918 by Lima. Scrapped in 1955. |
| Pittsburgh and West Virginia Railway | 8 | H6, H7 | 1001-1002, 1110, 1150-1153 | Built 1918 by Baldwin and ALCO. Scrapped between 1945-1953. |
| St. Louis-San Francisco Railway | 65 | 4100 | 4100–4164 | Built 1923-1926 by Baldwin. Scrapped in 1952. |
| Southern Railway | 115 | Ms-4 | 4800–4915 | Built 1923-1928 by ALCO and Baldwin. Scrapped between 1952-1954. |
| Southern subsidiary Alabama Great Southern Railroad | 8 | Ms-4 | 6622–6629 | Built 1926 by ALCO. Scrapped between 1941-1949. |
| Southern subsidiary Cincinnati, New Orleans and Texas Pacific Railroad | 43 | Ms-4 | 6320–6337, 6350–6374 | Built 1926 by Baldwin and ALCO. Scrapped between 1950-1955. |
| West Point Route (Atlanta and West Point Rail Road) | 1 | F | 430 | Built 1944 by Baldwin. Scrapped in 1949. |
| West Point Route (Western Railway of Alabama) | 1 | F | 380 | Built 1944 by Baldwin. Scrapped in 1952. |
| Total | 724 | | | |

None of the originals built under USRA auspices or any of the subsequent copies were preserved.
