= Great Northern class M-1 =

Class of American 2-6-8-0 Articulated Type steam locomotives

Great Northern Railway class M-1
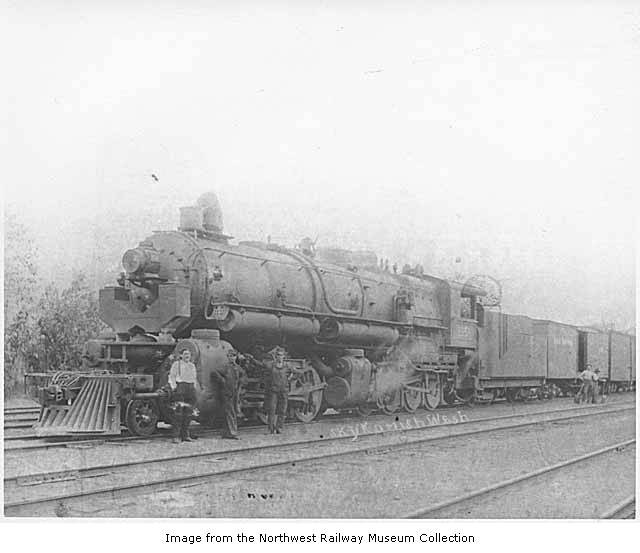
- GN 1951 at Skykomish, circa 1924
Type and origin
- Power type: Steam
- Builder: Baldwin Locomotive Works
- Serial number: 34024-34028, 34074-76, 34104-5, 34824-34833, 34965, 34967-68, 34997-99, 35046-35052, 35088-89
- Model: Baldwin 16-40/64 DE
- Build date: December 1909 – August 1910
- Total produced: 35
- Rebuilder: GN shops
- Rebuild date: 1926-1927 (Rebuilt to M-2); 1930 (to O-7 Mikados); 1932 (to O-8 Mikados)
- Number rebuilt: 35 (21 rebuilt to O-7, 3 to O-8)
Specifications
- Configuration
  - Whyte: 2-6-8-0
  - UIC: (1′C)D n4v
- Gauge: 4 ft 8 1/2 in (1,435 mm)
- Driver dia.: 55 in (1.397 m)
- Adhesive weight: 350,000 lb (160,000 kg)
- Loco weight: 368,700 lb (167,200 kg)
- Boiler pressure: 210 lbf/in^{2} (1.45 MPa)
- Cylinders: Four, Mallet compound
- High-pressure cylinder: 23 in × 32 in (584 mm × 813 mm)
- Low-pressure cylinder: 35 in × 32 in (889 mm × 813 mm)
Performance figures
- Maximum speed: 35–63 mph (56–101 km/h)
- Tractive effort: 78,360 lbf (348.56 kN)
Career
- Operators: Great Northern Railway
- Class: M-1
- Numbers: 1950–1984
- Retired: 1929–1954
- Disposition: All scrapped after rebuilding to class M-2, O-7 & O-8

The Great Northern Railway M-1 was a class of American 2-6-8-0 locomotives introduced in 1910. A total of 35 of these Mallet locomotives were built by Baldwin Locomotive Works for Great Northern Railway (GN) in two batches; the first 10 in December 1909 and a further 25 in June to August 1910. These engines were unusual because of their uneven driving wheel sets, the front having six driving wheels while the rear had eight.

All M-1's were converted from compound to simple-expansion cylinders from 1926 to 1927 and reclassified M-2. 22 M-2's were dismantled between 1929 and 1931, with parts being recycled for the new class O-7 Mikados numbered 3376-3396 in 1930. Three O7 Mikados were rebuilt to O8 Mikados numbered 3397-3399 in 1932. The 13 unrebuilt M-2's lasted until dieselisation and were sold for scrap between 1949 and 1954. No examples were preserved in any form.

== Images ==
- as M-1.
- as rebuilt to M-2.
