= Great Northern P-1 =

Class of 15 American 4-8-2 locomotives

Great Northern P-1 class
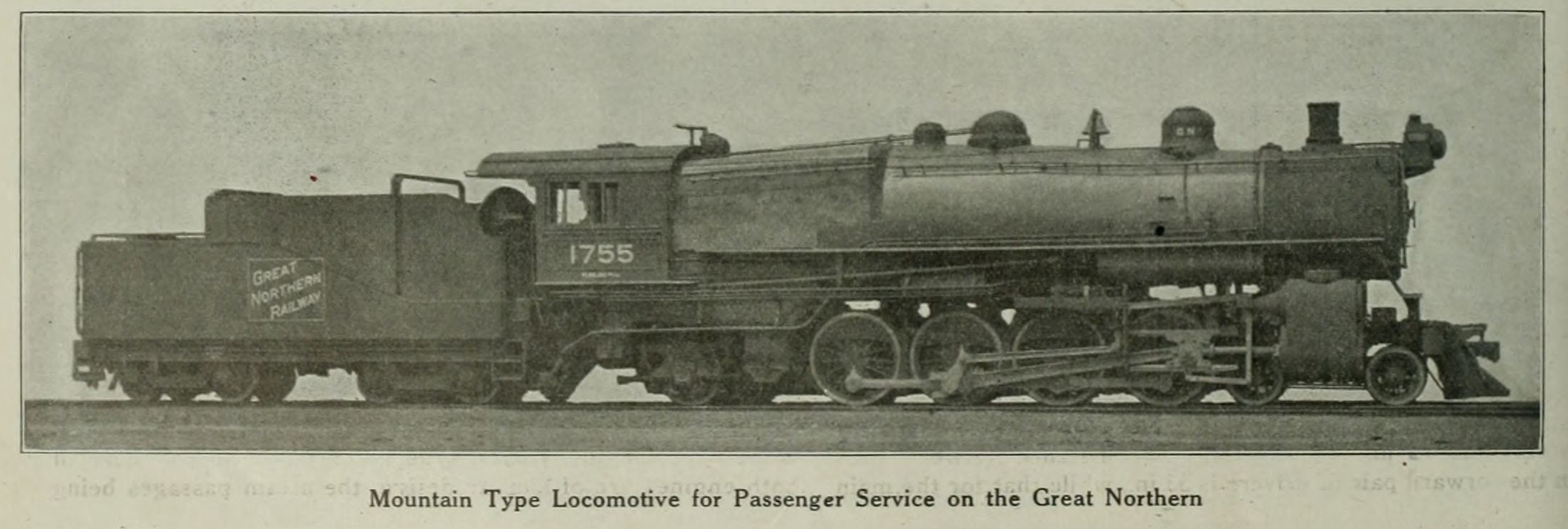
- Chart from Railway Age Gazette Volume 57 (23) pp 1047-1050 showing Mountain type locomotive 1755
Type and origin
- Power type: Steam
- Builder: Lima Locomotive Works
- Serial number: 1364-1378
- Build date: May-June 1914
- Total produced: 15
- Rebuild date: June-November 1928
- Number rebuilt: 15
Specifications
- Configuration
  - Whyte: 4-8-2
  - UIC: 2′D2′ h1
- Gauge: 4 ft 8 1/2 in (1,435 mm) standard gauge
- Leading dia.: 36.5 in (927 mm)
- Driver dia.: 63 in (1,600 mm)
- Trailing dia.: 42.5 in (1,080 mm)
- Wheelbase: 71.33 ft (21,741 mm)
- Axle load: 55,000 lb (25,000 kilograms; 25 metric tons)
- Adhesive weight: 218,000 lb (99,000 kilograms; 99 metric tons)
- Loco weight: 236,000 lb (107,000 kilograms; 107 metric tons)
- Tender weight: 161,000 lb (73,000 kilograms; 73 metric tons)
- Total weight: 487,000 lb (221,000 kilograms; 221 metric tons)
- Fuel type: Nos. 1750-1759: Coal; Nos. 1760-1764: Fuel oil
- Fuel capacity: 15 short tons (13.6 t; 13.4 long tons)
- Water cap.: 8,000 US gal (30,000 L; 6,700 imp gal)
- Firebox
  - Grate area: 78 sq ft (7.2 m^{2})
- Boiler: 95 in (2,413 mm)
- Boiler pressure: 180 lbf/in^{2} (1.24 MPa)
- Heating surface
  - Firebox: 340 sq ft (32 m^{2})
- Cylinders: Two
- Cylinder size: 28 in × 32 in (711 mm × 813 mm)
- Valve gear: Walschaert
Performance figures
- Tractive effort: 60,928 lbf (271.02 kN)
- Factor of adh.: 3.58
Career
- Operators: Great Northern
- Class: P-1
- Numbers: 1750–1764 (P-1) 2175-2189 (Q-2)
- Retired: 1928 (1953-1958 as Q-2s)
- Preserved: 0
- Disposition: All rebuilt to Q-2 Class 2-10-2s in 1928 and scrapped by last retirement

The Great Northern P-1 was a class of 15 4-8-2 "Mountain" type steam locomotives built by the Lima Locomotive Works in 1914 and operated by the Great Northern Railway.

== History ==
Initially assigned to pull passenger trains, the P-1s were found to be too slow and were reassigned to freight service. Between June and November 1928, all P-1s were rebuilt by the GN's Superior, Great Falls, and Hillyard Shops into Q-2 Class 2-10-2s.

== Disposition ==
Neither the P-1s nor the Q-2s have survived into preservation today. Retirement started on July 16, 1953 and were all retired by April 1958.
