= Great Northern class Q-1 =

Class of American 2-10-2 Santa Fe Type steam locomotives

Great Northern Q-1 class
Type and origin
- Power type: Steam
- Builder: Baldwin Locomotive Works
- Serial number: 57410, 57442, 57517-57532, 57559–57568, 57592, 57593
- Build date: November-December 1923
- Total produced: 30
Specifications
- Configuration
  - Whyte: 2-10-2
  - UIC: 1′E2′ h1
- Gauge: 4 ft 8 1/2 in (1,435 mm) standard gauge
- Leading dia.: 33 in (838 mm)
- Driver dia.: 63 in (1,600 mm)
- Trailing dia.: 42 in (1,067 mm)
- Tender wheels: 33 in (838 mm)
- Wheelbase: Loco & tender: 86.22 ft (26.28 m)
- Length: 98 ft 2 7/8 in (29.94 m)
- Width: 11 ft 2 1/4 in (3.41 m)
- Height: 16 ft 1 5/8 in (4.92 m)
- Axle load: 71,200 lb (32,300 kilograms; 32.3 metric tons)
- Adhesive weight: 342,490 lb (155,350 kilograms; 155.35 metric tons)
- Loco weight: 428,340 lb (194,290 kilograms; 194.29 metric tons)
- Tender weight: Working: 324,500 lb (147,200 kilograms; 147.2 metric tons); Empty: 136,300 lb (61,800 kilograms; 61.8 metric tons)
- Total weight: 752,840 lb (341,480 kilograms; 341.48 metric tons)
- Tender type: Vanderbilt, Open-bottom
- Fuel type: Fuel oil
- Fuel capacity: 5,800 US gal (22,000 L; 4,800 imp gal)
- Water cap.: 17,000 US gal (64,000 L; 14,000 imp gal)
- Firebox
  - Grate area: 88 sq ft (8.2 m^{2})
- Boiler: 90 in (2,300 mm)
- Boiler pressure: 225 lbf/in^{2} (1.55 MPa)
- Heating surface
  - Firebox: 409 sq ft (38.0 m^{2})
- Superheater
  - Type: Type E
  - Heating area: 1,518 sq ft (141.0 m^{2})
- Cylinders: Two
- Cylinder size: 31 in × 32 in (787 mm × 813 mm)
- Valve gear: Walschaert
Performance figures
- Tractive effort: 87,131 lbf (387.58 kN)
- Factor of adh.: 3.93
Career
- Operators: Great Northern
- Class: Q-1
- Numbers: 2100–2129
- Retired: 1950-1958
- Disposition: All scrapped

The Great Northern Q-1 was a class of 30 2-10-2 "Santa Fe" type steam locomotives built by the Baldwin Locomotive Works in 1923 and operated by the Great Northern Railway pulling freight until the late 1950s.

== History ==
When the Great Northern received the locomotives, they hauled freight across the system and were rated at pulling 3,000 tons between Whitefish, Montana and Shelby, Montana. Nos. 2101, 2107 and 2120 were assigned to the Mesabi Division for ore train service on August 20, 1951. However, they would soon be replaced by diesel locomotives and retirement started on January 31, 1950. By May 1958, all the Q-1s were retired.

== Disposition ==
None of the Q-1s have been preserved all 30 locomotives were replaced by new Diesel Locomotives that replaced them pulling freight trains in 1950 and 1958.

== Roster ==
Number	Baldwin serial number	Date built	Disposition	Notes
2100	57410	November 1923	Sold for scrap January 31, 1950.	Received booster that added 12,200 lbs. of tractive effort.
2101	57442	November 1923	Retired May 1958, sold for scrap.	Received booster that added 12,200 lbs. of tractive effort.
2102	57517	November 1923	Sold for scrap May 9, 1955.	Received booster that added 12,200 lbs. of tractive effort.
2103	57518	November 1923	Sold for scrap October 7 1955.	Received booster that added 12,200 lbs. of tractive effort.
2104	57519	November 1923	Sold for scrap July 16, 1953.	Received booster that added 12,200 lbs. of tractive effort.
2105	57520	November 1923	Sold for scrap October 7 1955.	Received booster that added 12,200 lbs. of tractive effort.
2106	57521	November 1923	Sold for scrap August 25, 1955.	Received booster that added 12,200 lbs. of tractive effort.
2107	57522	November 1923	Retired May 1958, sold for scrap.	Received booster that added 12,200 lbs. of tractive effort.
2108	57523	November 1923	Sold for scrap October 3, 1950.	Received booster that added 12,200 lbs. of tractive effort.
2109	57524	November 1923	Sold for scrap May 3, 1952.	Received booster that added 12,200 lbs. of tractive effort.
2110	57525	November 1923	Sold for scrap October 7 1955.	
2111	57526	November 1923	Retired August 1951, sold for scrap.	Received booster that added 12,200 lbs. of tractive effort.
2112	57527	November 1923	Sold for scrap October 7 1955.	Received booster that added 12,200 lbs. of tractive effort.
2113	57528	November 1923	Sold for scrap December 13, 1954.	
2114	57529	November 1923	Sold for scrap December 13, 1954.	
2115	57530	November 1923	Sold for scrap August 16, 1956.	
2116	57531	November 1923	Sold for scrap August 25, 1955.	Received booster that added 12,200 lbs. of tractive effort.
2117	57532	November 1923	Sold for scrap August 16, 1956.	Received booster that added 12,200 lbs. of tractive effort.
2118	57559	November 1923	Sold for scrap January 31, 1950.	
2119	57560	November 1923	Sold for scrap July 16, 1953.	Received booster that added 12,200 lbs. of tractive effort.
2120	57561	November 1923	Retired May 1958, sold for scrap.	Received booster that added 12,200 lbs. of tractive effort.
2121	57562	November 1923	Sold for scrap April 19, 1956.	Received booster that added 12,200 lbs. of tractive effort.
2122	57563	November 1923	Retired December 1957, scrapped 1962.	Received booster that added 12,200 lbs. of tractive effort.
2123	57564	November 1923	Sold for scrap May 9, 1955.	Received booster that added 12,200 lbs. of tractive effort.
2124	57565	November 1923	Sold for scrap December 28, 1954.	Received booster that added 12,200 lbs. of tractive effort.
2125	57566	November 1923	Sold for scrap April 19, 1956.	Received booster that added 12,200 lbs. of tractive effort.
2126	57567	November 1923	Sold for scrap August 16, 1956	Received booster that added 12,200 lbs. of tractive effort.
2127	57568	November 1923	Retired December 1957, sold for scrap.	Received booster that added 12,200 lbs. of tractive effort.
2128	57592	December 1923	Retired December 1957, sold for scrap.	Received booster that added 12,200 lbs. of tractive effort.
2129	57593	December 1923	Sold for scrap November 19, 1950.	Received booster that added 12,200 lbs. of tractive effort.
