= Trainphone =

Railway voice communication system

Trainphone was the Pennsylvania Railroad's system for voice communication between crews on moving trains, dispatchers, and tower operators. It was also used by the Kansas City Southern, and to a lesser extent on the Duluth, Missabe & Iron Range. It did not use radio, but rather electromagnetic induction. Railroads did not own any radio frequencies at the time, and the PRR's busy network found the previous methods (passing a physical paper message, or requiring a train to stop to pick up orders) insufficient. The trainphone system was first tested in 1936 and perfected by 1943.

== Equipment ==
=== Shore transmitter ===
The system used the track itself, or lineside telegraph wires, as the "shore" transmitter. The trainphone signal — low frequency current in the hundreds of kilohertz — was passed through the track or wires and induced a corresponding current in the locomotive or car's receiving antenna. The range was only a hundred feet or so, but this was sufficient.

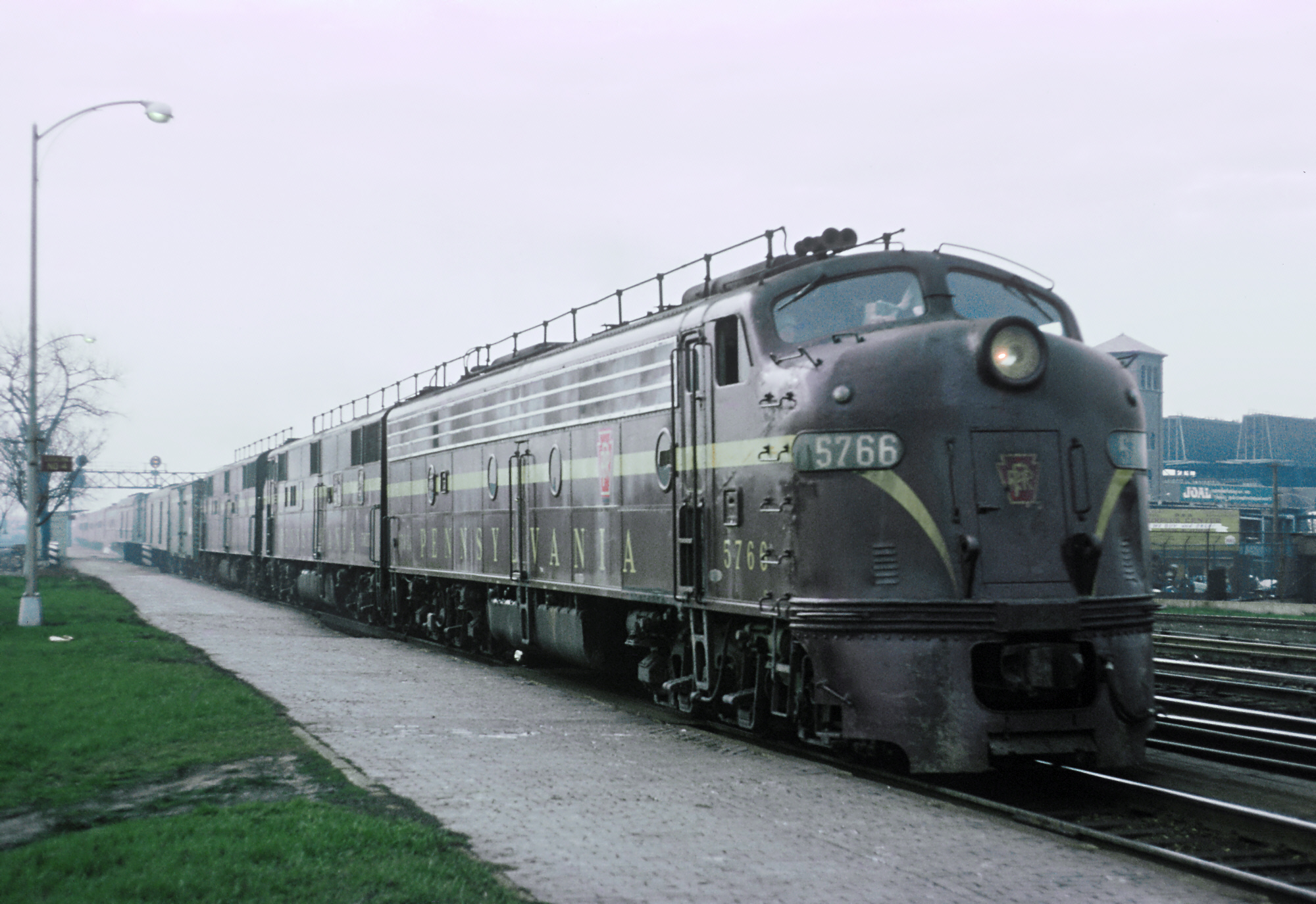
PRR E8 diesel locomotive with trainphone antenna

=== Antenna ===
Mobile trainphone antennas took the form of long, handrail-looking structures atop the tender of steam locomotives, atop the bodies of diesel locomotives, or running the entire length of a cabin car (PRR term for caboose).

=== Telephone handset ===
The engineer or other crew member would talk through a regular-looking telephone handset. An attention loudspeaker was also installed, but it was easier to hear the messages with the handset.

== Problems ==
The biggest problem with the trainphone system was that it could not work in electrified zones, because of interference from the electric supply and electrical equipment on the locomotive. Since the electrified zones were among the PRR's busiest, this was a serious disadvantage.

== Replacement ==
The trainphone system was abandoned in the 1960s as radio took over.
