= 2-6-8-0 =

Articulated locomotive wheel arrangement

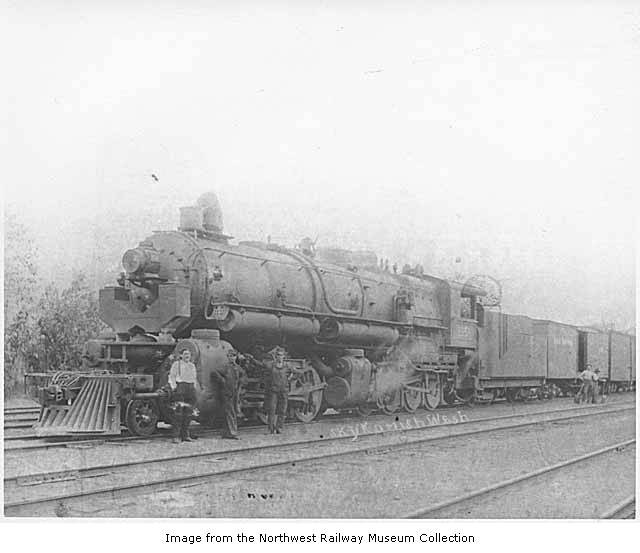
GN #1951 at Skykomish, Washington in 1924.

A 2-6-8-0 steam locomotive, in the Whyte notation for describing locomotive wheel arrangements, has two leading wheels, a set of six driving wheels, a set of eight driving wheels, and no trailing wheels. These locomotives usually employ the Mallet principle of articulation, with a swinging front engine and a rigidly attached rear engine.

== Equivalent classifications ==
Other equivalent classifications are:
UIC classification: 1CD (also known as German classification and Italian classification)
French classification: 130+040
Turkish classification: 34+44
Swiss classification: 3/4+4/4

The UIC classification is refined to (1'C)D for Mallet locomotives.

== Examples ==
This type of articulated locomotive is unusual in having different numbers of driving axles in each set, and was only found in the United States of America and Germany. The Great Northern Railway and the Alabama Great Southern, a predecessor of the Southern Railway, both in the United States, were the sole long-term users of this type of locomotive.

Great Northern received 35 from Baldwin in 1910, numbered 1950–1984, designated class M-1. The M1s were rebuilt to use simple expansion In 1926 and 1927 and were redesignated class M-2. Most of the M-2s did not last long, being converted to class O-7 2-8-2s between 1929 and 1931; the thirteen exceptions remained in service until 1949–1954. The AGS had a single example in this wheel arrangement, number 300. It went to the Southern Railway and was later joined by two other 2-6-8-0 types numbered 4002 and 4003.

This unusual wheel arrangement was the subject of some experimentation. The Erie Railroad briefly had a locomotive of this type numbered 2900, but it was rebuilt to a 2-8-0 in 1916 after only six years. The Baldwin Locomotive Works marketed a front end "kit" whereby conventional 2-8-0 locomotives could be converted to 2-6-8-0 types. None of this type locomotive have been preserved.

Baltimore & Ohio Railroad had some 2-6-8-0 steam locomotives in their KL-1 class.

In Germany, during World War II, Deutsche Reichsbahn started work on a condensing 2-6-8-0 mallet locomotive built by Borsig. These were to have dual smoke stacks and had smoke deflectors to help with the driver's visibility while driving the locomotive. The locomotive would have been the largest on the German rail network, but as it was nearing completion in Borsig Werke it was destroyed in an RAF bombing raid.
