= Wishram, Washington =

- Census-designated place
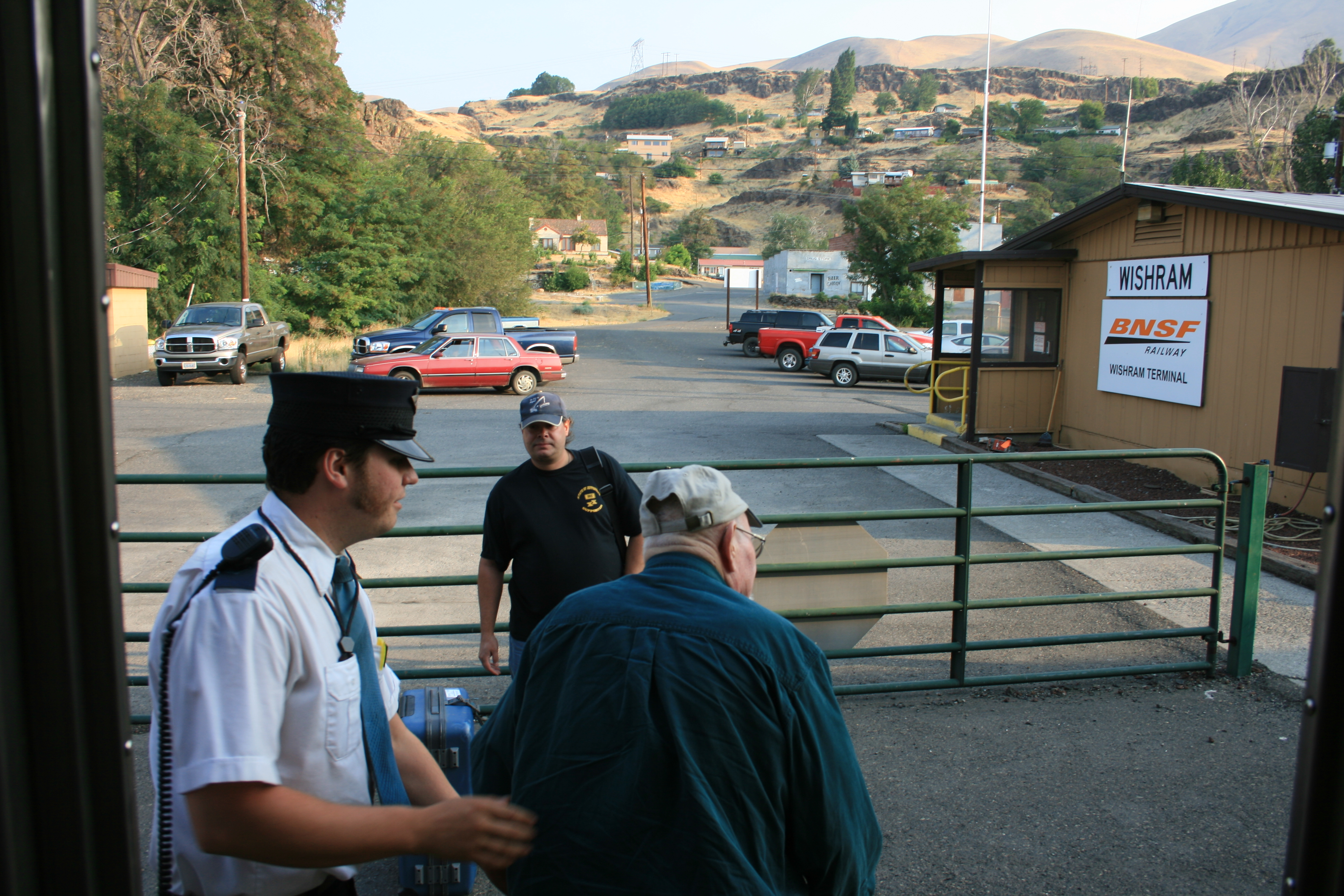
- Passengers deboarding the Empire Builder at Wishram station

- Location of Wishram in Klickitat County, Washington
- Coordinates: 45°39′40″N 120°57′32″W
- Country: United States
- State: Washington
- County: Klickitat

Area
  - Total: 1.3 sq mi (3.3 km^{2})
  - Land: 1.3 sq mi (3.3 km^{2})
  - Water: 0 sq mi (0.0 km^{2})
- Elevation: 177 ft (54 m)

Population (2020)
  - Total: 366
  - Density: 290/sq mi (110/km^{2})
- Time zone: UTC-8 (Pacific (PST))
  - Summer (DST): UTC-7 (PDT)
- ZIP code: 98673
- Area code: 509
- FIPS code: 53-79485
- GNIS feature ID: 2409618

Wishram is an unincorporated community and census-designated place (CDP) in Klickitat County, Washington, United States. The population was 366 at the 2020 census. The site of the historic Celilo Falls is nearby.

The community was originally named "Fallbridge"; it was changed to "Wishram" to honor the Wishram tribe of Native Americans. The Dalles Dam, 9 miles (14 km) downstream on the Columbia River, was completed in 1957, and began filling Lake Celilo. The original fishing village near this location was inundated.

== Geography ==
Wishram is located in southern Klickitat County, sitting on the north bank of the Columbia River. State Route 14 runs east–west through the community, traveling west towards Vancouver and Dallesport and east towards Maryhill; it intersects with two U.S. highways that provide access to Oregon via bridges over the Columbia River.

According to the United States Census Bureau, the Wishram CDP has a total area of 1.3 square miles (3.3 km^{2}), all of it land.

== Geology ==
Wishram's location results from two major geological features: the location of the Celilo Falls on the Columbia River, and the access to the Central Oregon Plateau via the Deschutes River just across the falls from Wishram. The falls not only provided early peoples a reliable source of food, but it later provided a convenient location for an easily constructed railroad bridge crossing the Columbia. The Deschutes valley just to the south of the falls provided a route for rail access to the south, and ultimately to California.

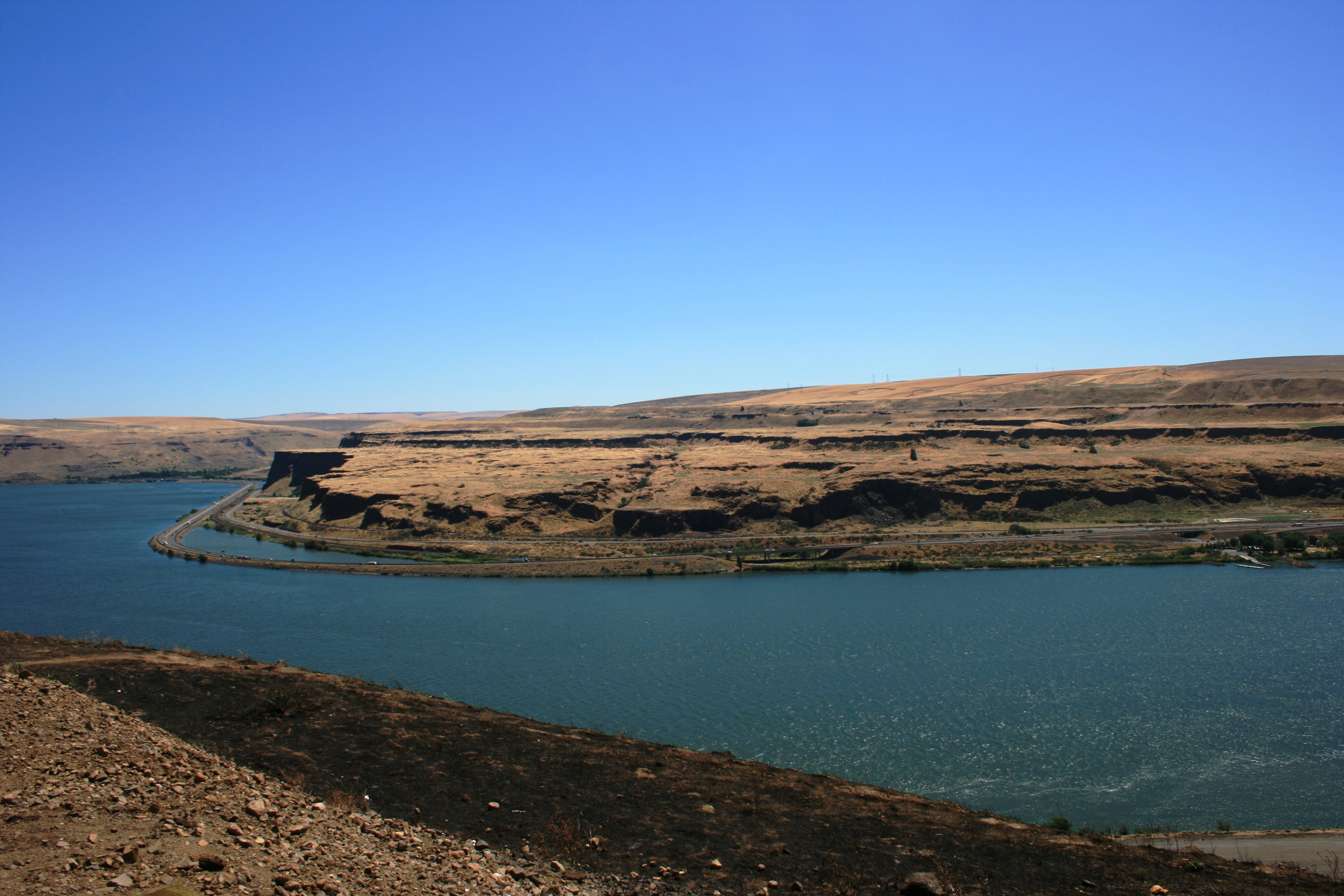
Extensive erosion is visible across the river from Wishram near the mouth of the Deschutes River. Note the interstate highway along the far side of the river.

Wishram lies toward the upper end of the Columbia River Gorge, which began forming as far back as the Miocene (roughly 12 - 17 million years ago), depositing thick layers of Columbia River Basalt, and continued to take shape through the Pleistocene (700,000 - 2 million years ago). During this period the Cascade Range was forming, slowly moving the Columbia River's course north to its current location.

Although the river slowly eroded the land over this period of time, the most drastic changes took place at the end of the last ice age when the Missoula Floods cut the steep, dramatic walls that exist around Wishram today. During the flood, the water level rose to 700 feet (210 m) above the current level, violently eroding and exposing the layered basalt. This quick erosion left many layers of volcanic rock exposed.

== History ==
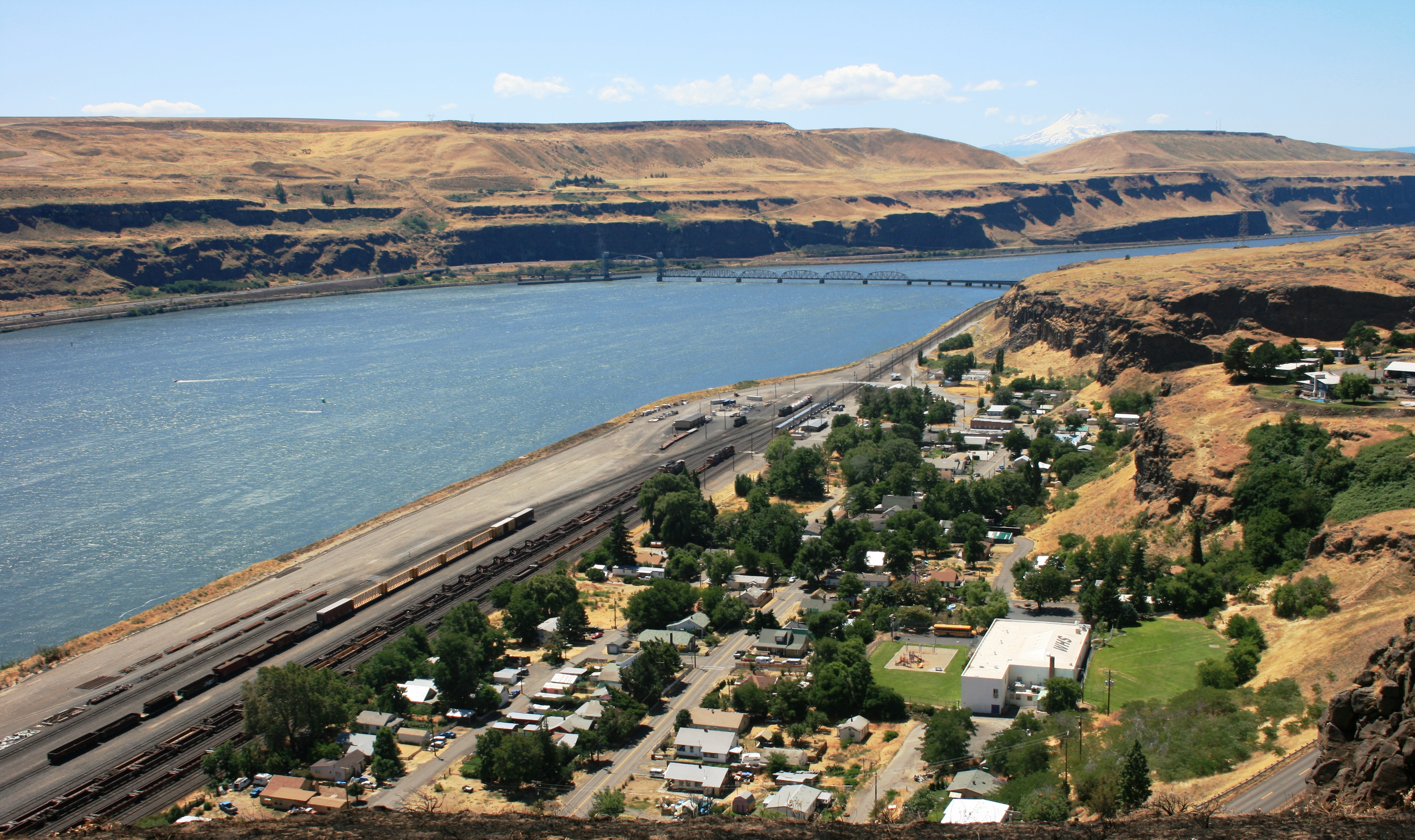
Wishram as seen from above. Note the rail bridge across the Columbia River in the west and Mount Hood in the distance.

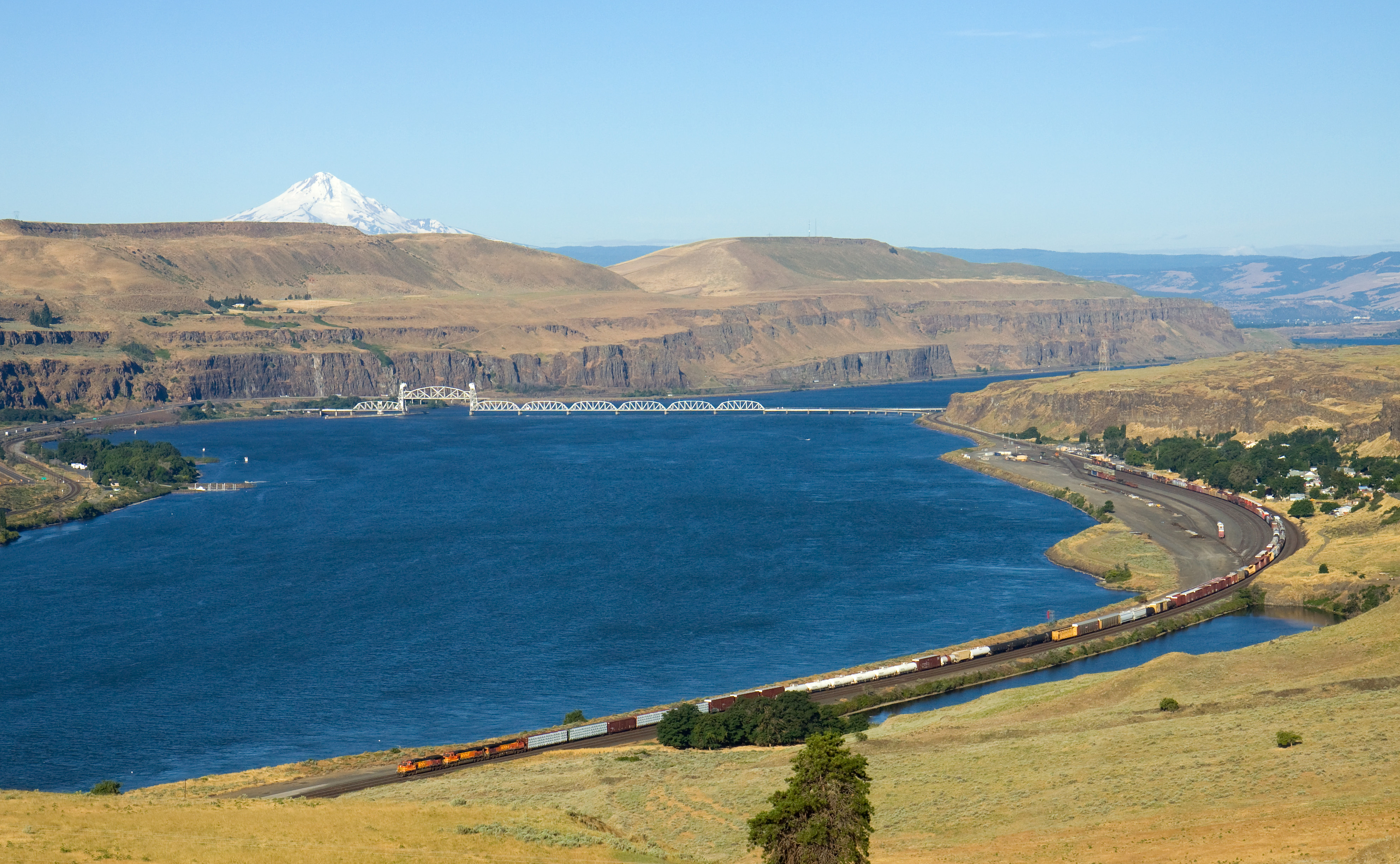
Wishram railway yard with a BNSF freight train with Oregon cliffs and Mount Hood in the background

The area of Wishram was located 1/2 mile (0.8 km) above the head of the great Celilo Falls on the Columbia, and as a result has been populated for an extended period. For around 15,000 years, native peoples gathered to fish and exchange goods. They built wooden platforms out over the water and caught salmon with dipnets and long spears on poles as the fish swam up through the rapids and jumped over the falls. Celilo Falls and The Dalles were strategically located at the border between Chinookan and Sahaptian-speaking peoples and served as the center of an extensive trading network across the Pacific Plateau. It was noted by early explorers and historians of the area.

In 1892, the U.S. government completed a set of locks to bypass Celilo Falls on the southern shore, across from Wishram. Built at a cost of $5 million, these locks saw limited service as much of the freight in and out of the Pacific Northwest began to travel by rail.

In 1912, the unincorporated town was known as "Fallbridge", named in recognition of the southern extension of the Spokane, Portland and Seattle Railway, which crossed the Columbia on the Oregon Trunk Rail Bridge constructed on the basalt rock of Celilo Falls.

=== Lewis and Clark ===
Lewis and Clark mentioned the site of Wishram in their journal. In his journal entry for October 22, 1805, Clark recorded:

"below this Island on the main Stard Shore is 16 Lodges of nativs; here we landed a fiew minits to Smoke, the lower point of one Island opposite which heads in the mouth of Towarnehiooks River (Deschutes River) which I did not observe until after passing these lodges about 1/2 a mile lower passed 6 more Lodges on the Same Side and 6 miles below the upper mouth of Towarnehiooks River the commencement of the pitch of the Great falls, opposite on the Stard. Side (Starboard or right side) is 17 Lodges [archaeologists have identified this as modern Wishram] of the nativs we landed and walked down accompanied by an old man to view the falls, and the best rout for to make a portage which we Soon discovered was much nearest on the Stard. Side, and the distance 1200 yards one third of the way on a rock, about 200 yards over a loose Sand collected in a hollar blown by the winds from the bottoms below which was disagreeable to pass, as it was Steep and loose. at the lower part of those rapids we arrived at 5 Large Lodges of nativs drying and prepareing fish for market, they gave us Philburts, and berries to eate, we returned droped down to the head of the rapids and took every article except the Canoes across the portag where I had formed a camp on ellegable Situation for the protection of our Stores from Thieft, which we were more fearfull of, than their arrows. we despatched two men to examine the river on the opposite Side, and reported that the Canoes could be taken down a narrow Chanel on the opposite Side after a Short portage at the head of the falls, at which place the Indians take over their Canoes. Indians assisted us over the portage with our heavy articles on their horses, the waters is divided into Several narrow chanels which pass through a hard black rock forming Islands of rocks at this Stage of the water, on those Islands of rocks as well as at and about their Lodges I observe great numbers of Stacks of pounded Salmon neetly preserved in the following manner, i e after Suffiently Dried it is pounded between two Stones fine, and put into a species of basket neetly made of grass and rushes of better than two feet long and one foot Diamiter, which basket is lined with the Skin of Salmon Stretched and dried for the purpose, in theis it is pressed down as hard as is possible, when full they Secure the open part with the fish Skins across which they fasten tho the loops of the basket that part very Securely, and then on a Dry Situation they Set those baskets the Corded part up, their common Custom is to Set 7 as close as they can Stand and 5 on the top of them, and secure them with mats which is raped around them and made fast with cords and Covered also with mats, those 12 baskets of from 90 to 100 w. each form a Stack. thus preserved those fish may be kept Sound and Sweet Several years, as those people inform me, Great quantities as they inform us are Sold to the whites people who visit the mouth of this river as well as to the nativs below."

By the time they returned on April 16, 1806, they reported the village had moved about 300 yards below the spot where it had been located the previous fall, and tended to move with the favored fishing locations.

=== Early history ===
The American author Washington Irving also mentioned the Native Americans resident at Wishram in his history of the Northwest titled Astoria or, Anecdotes of an Enterprise Beyond the Rocky Mountains and published in 1836. He stated:

"For like reason we would make especial mention of the village of Wishram, at the head of the Long Narrows, as being a solitary instance of an aboriginal trading mart, or emporium. Here the salmon caught in the neighboring rapids were 'warehoused,' to await customers. Hither the tribes from the mouth of the Columbia repaired with the fish of the sea-coast, the roots, berries, and especially the wappatoo, gathered in the lower parts of the river, together with goods and trinkets obtained from the ships which casually visit the coast. Hither also the tribes from the Rocky Mountains brought down horses, bear-grass, quamash, and other commodities of the interior. The merchant fishermen at the falls acted as middlemen or factors, and passed the objects of traffic, as it were, cross-handed; trading away part of the wares received from the mountain tribes to those of the rivers and plains, and vice versa: their packages of pounded salmon entered largely into the system of barter, and being carried off in opposite directions, found their way to the savage hunting camps far in the interior, and to the casual white traders who touched upon the coast."

Wishram is extensively mentioned in regional histories and travelogues of the early 19th century. Visitors included Thomas Farnham, Hudson's Bay Company Governor Sir George Simpson, Alexander Ross, Father Pierre De Smet and Joseph Drayton's party of the Wilkes Expedition, among others. Ross reported that at Wishram the summer encampments when the salmon were running could swell to 3,000 natives. Father De Smet described it as a glorious time of rejoicing, gambling and feasting.

There have been village sites at the Wishram location for millennia. Archeologists in the 1950s identified a multilevel site with centuries of waste accumulated in middens as well as petroglyphs and other indications of dense population. Most of the densely populated areas were close to the river and convenient to fishing. This lower area was flooded in 1957 by water backed up behind The Dalles Dam.

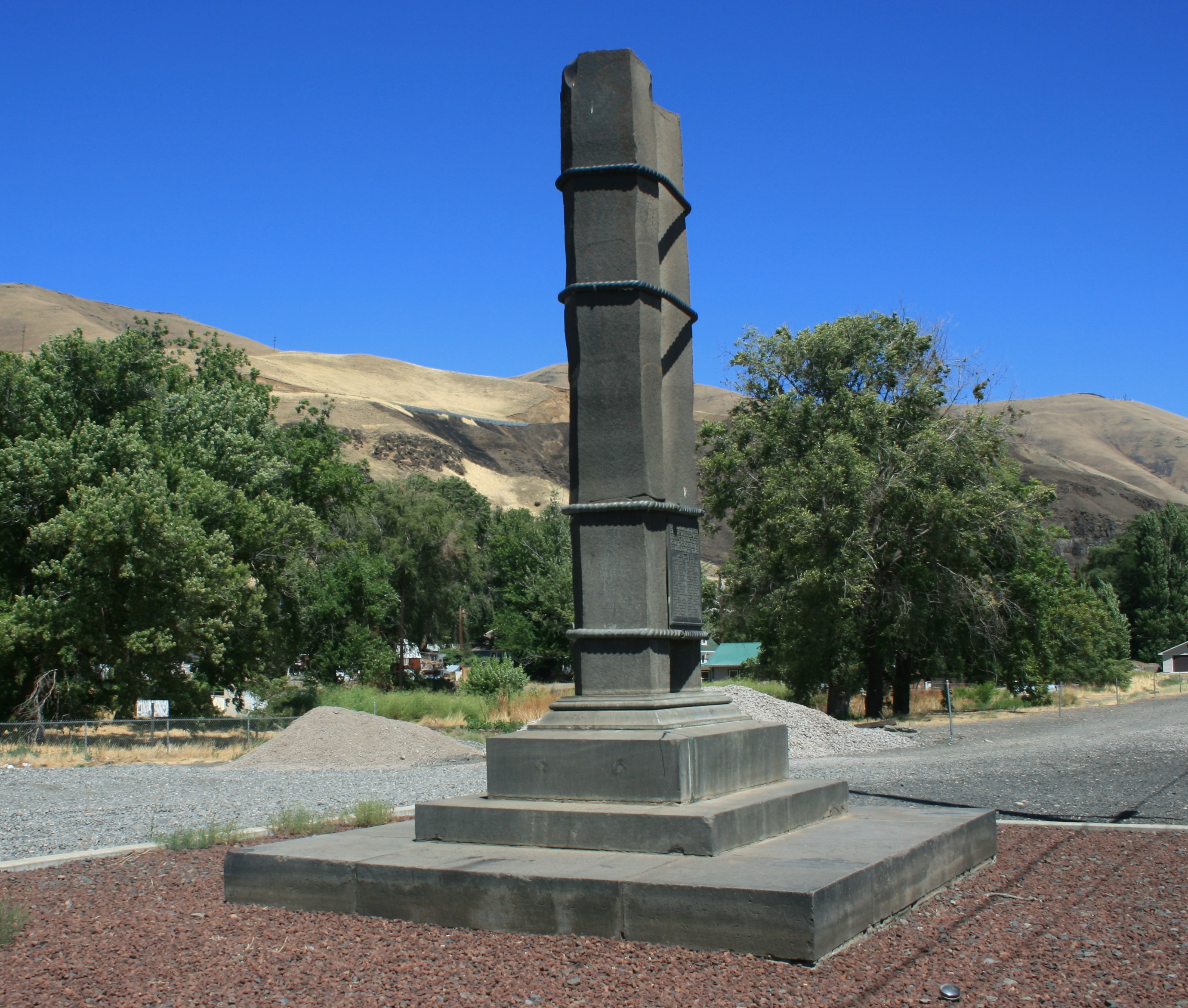
The pioneer memorial raised in 1926

In 1926 a pioneer memorial was raised at Wishram/Fallbridge. Still located in its original position 100 feet (30 m) east of the passenger train station today, it consists of two columns of basalt bound together with iron straps and mounted on a pedestal. A bronze plaque recognizing various pioneers who have been to Wishram begins with Meriwether Lewis and ends with John C. Fremont. It originally marked the beginning of a 1/2-mile (0.8 km) path from that monument to Celilo Falls; that path is now covered by the backwaters from The Dalles Dam.

=== Wishram/Fallbridge as a rail center ===
The Spokane, Portland and Seattle Railway was chartered in 1905 by James J. Hill for the purposes of connecting the two transcontinental railroads owned by him, the Northern Pacific and Great Northern, to Portland, Oregon from Spokane, Washington, in order to gain a portion of the lumber trade in Oregon, a business that at the time was dominated by E. H. Harriman's Union Pacific and Southern Pacific railroads. Construction began in 1906 under the name Portland & Seattle Railway, proceeding eastward from Vancouver, Washington. 1906 also saw the start of construction of the line between Vancouver and Portland. This railroad included the first bridge of any kind to be built across the lower Columbia River: the bridge now known as the BNSF Railway Bridge 9.6, in Vancouver.

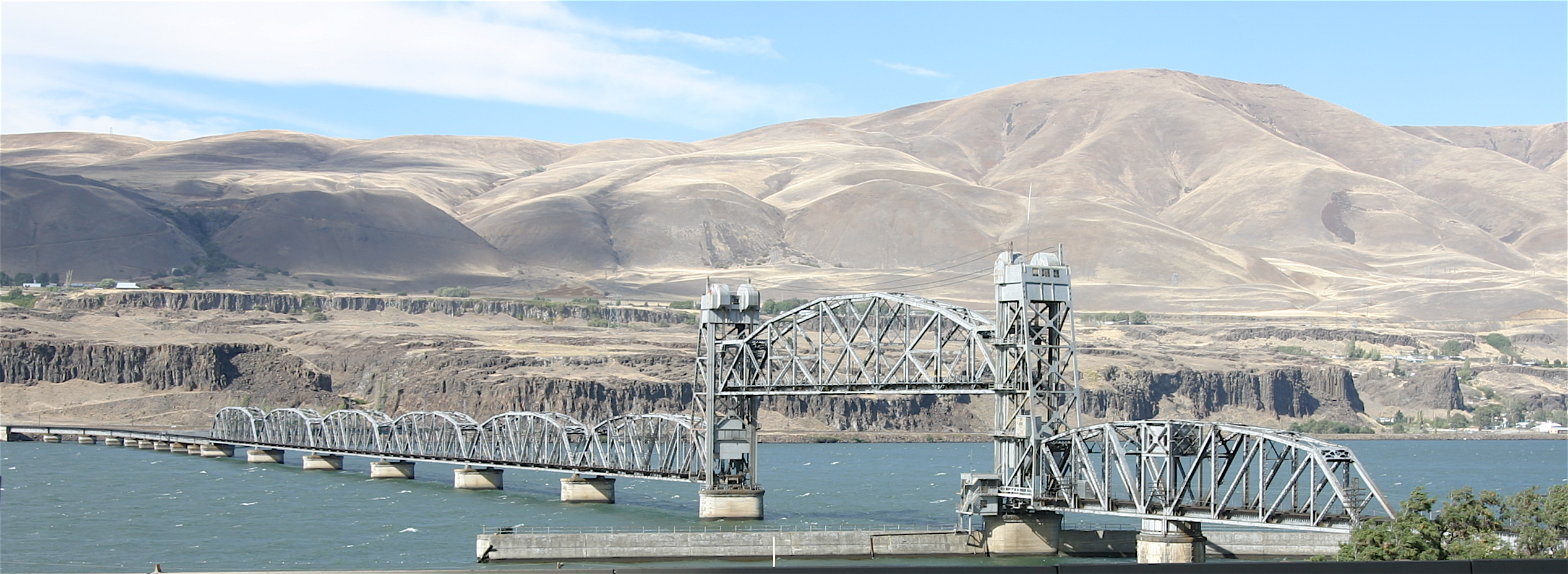
Oregon Trunk Rail Bridge

Within a year, and despite legal challenges from Harriman, who wished to block its construction, the line had been built as far as Pasco, Washington, along the Columbia River, where there was a connection with Northern Pacific lines. The first section to open was from Pasco west through Wishram to cliffs (near Maryhill), a length of 112 miles (180 km), on December 15, 1907. Operation was extended west to Lyle, for a total of 145 miles (233 km), on January 15, 1908, as construction continued on the 56-mile (90 km) section from there to Vancouver.

The town of Wishram (then known as Fallbridge) was fortuitously situated at a location which made bridging the Columbia River relatively easy. It was possible to construct a bridge that had piers resting on normally exposed basalt rock above the waterfall during low water periods such that during periods of high water, when this stretch of the Columbia River became raging rapids, the piers supported a bridge spanning the entire flood. This bridge over Celilo Falls became known as the Oregon Trunk Rail Bridge or the fallbridge. The location of this bridge also allowed construction of rail through the Deschutes River canyon, allowing access to eastern Oregon's high desert plateau and the eastern side of the Cascade Range.

As a result, the SP&S was extended southward from Wishram toward Bend, Oregon. Hill and Harriman engaged in a head-to-head battle up the Deschutes grade, with intense competition for any advantageous routing. After the competition reached what has been described as ridiculous levels, Hariman died in 1909 and an agreement was reached that the extension was to be jointly operated with a Union Pacific subsidiary, the Oregon-Washington Railway & Navigation. This southern extension relied upon the Oregon Trunk Rail Bridge – the "fall bridge" – constructed just downstream of Wishram at the waterfall on the Columbia. James J. Hill inaugurated this route, driving a golden spike in Bend in 1912. Fallbridge served as a passenger terminal, roundhouse and freight switch yard for traffic into Bend. Recognizing its central location, a 300-ton automatic coaling station was erected for the Spokane, Portland & Seattle Railroad at Fallbridge in 1920.

The name was officially changed to "Wishram" in 1926. However, the name of Fallbridge continues to appear in various documents. In 1931 the official schedules for the railway used "Wishram (Fallbridge)" as the designation for the stop at Wishram. The town still appears as "Fallbridge" in 1940 U.S. Army Corps of Engineers port directories, and in 1941 in standard textbooks.

In 1931, the SP&S line to Bend was connected via Klamath Falls, Oregon, to Bieber, California, providing a shortcut to connect with the Western Pacific Railroad in northern California.

== Demographics ==
Historical population
Census	Pop.	Note	%±
2000	213		—
2010	342		60.6%
2020	366		7.0%
U.S. Decennial Census; 1990 2000 2010 2020

Wishram first appeared as a census designated place in the 2000 U.S. census.

=== 2010 Census ===
As of the census of 2010, there were 342 people, 146 households, and 83 families residing in the CDP. The racial makeup of the CDP was 88.9% White, 1.2% African American, 6.1% Native American, 1.2% from other races, and 1.8% from two or more races. Hispanic or Latino people of any race were 8.5% of the population.

=== 2000 Census ===
As of the census of 2000, there were 213 people, 122 households, and 89 families residing in the CDP. The population density was 254.2 people per square mile (98.5/km^{2}). There were 122 housing units at an average density of 152.2/sq mi (59.0/km^{2}). The racial makeup of the CDP was 84.9% White, 0% African American, 9.3% Native American, 3.1% from other races, and 2.8% from two or more races. Hispanic or Latino people of any race were 3.1% of the population.

There were 122 households, out of which 21.7% had children under the age of 18 living with them, 40.1% were married couples living together, 13.2% had a female householder with no husband present, and 41.4% were non-families. 36.8% of all households were made up of individuals, and 16.4% had someone living alone who was 65 years of age or older. The average household size was 2.13 and the average family size was 2.74.

In the CDP, the population was spread out, with 25.0% under the age of 18, 5.2% from 18 to 24, 25.0% from 25 to 44, 25.3% from 45 to 64, and 19.4% who were 65 years of age or older. The median age was 41 years. For every 100 females, there were 110.4 males. For every 100 females age 18 and over, there were 99.2 males.

The median income for a household in the CDP was $26,667, and the median income for a family was $23,750. Males had a median income of $31,042 versus $23,229 for females. The per capita income for the CDP was $15,414. About 27.7% of families and 26.3% of the population were below the poverty line, including 43.3% of those under age 18 and 9.3% of those age 65 or over.

== Transportation ==
Wishram Amtrak station is served daily by the Empire Builder train. Wishram has a railyard, with a substantial maintenance facility, for train traffic coming north from Oregon and California, as well as those coming west. The section of railroad that runs from Vancouver to Pasco still bears the town's original name of Fallbridge.
