= Great Northern class Z-1 =

Class of American electric locomotives

Z-1
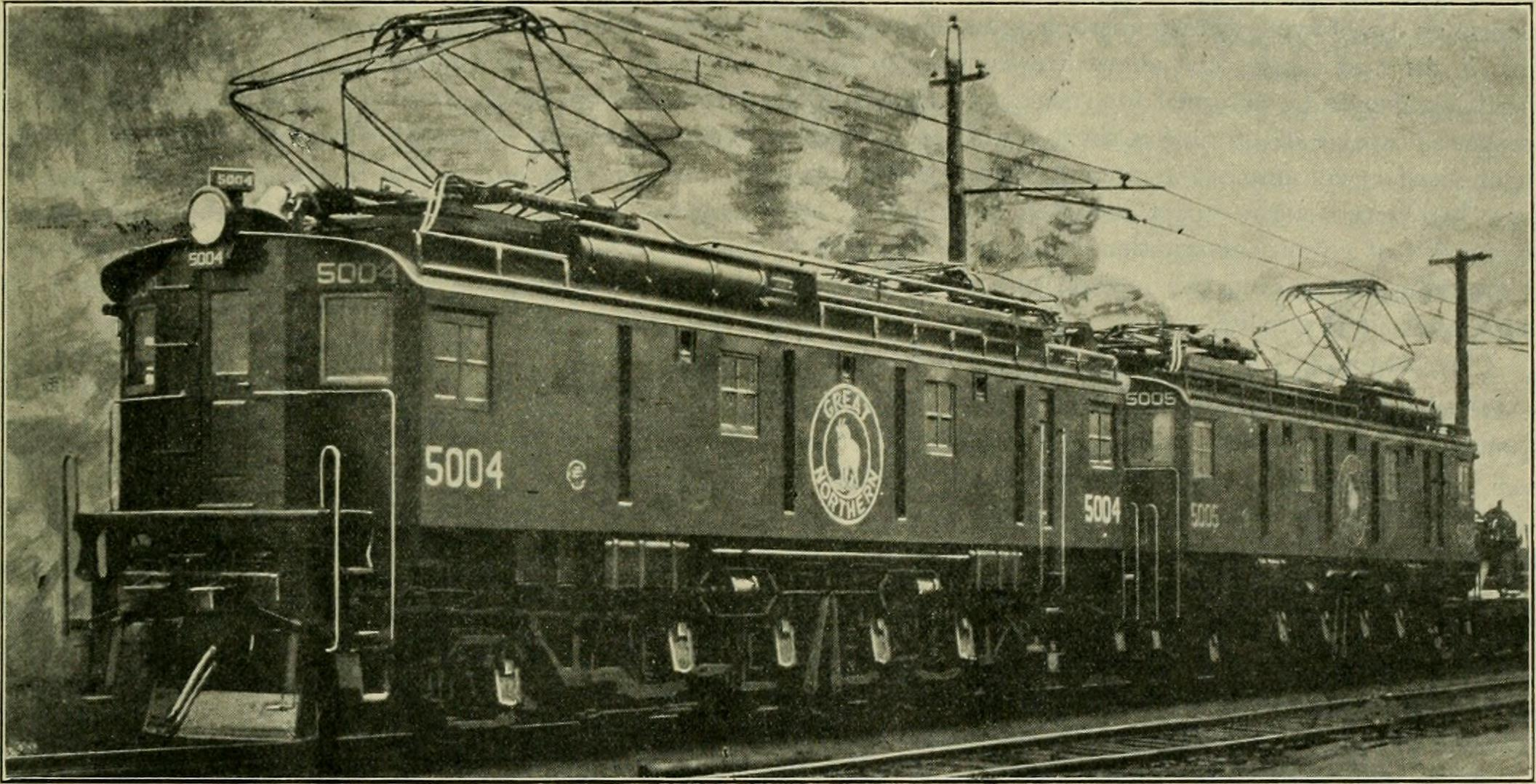
Type and origin
- Power type: Electric
- Builder: Baldwin-Westinghouse
- Serial number: see table
- Build date: December 1926 – October 1928
- Total produced: 10
Specifications
- Configuration
  - AAR: 1-D-1
  - UIC: 1′Do1′
- Gauge: 1,435 mm (4 ft 8 1/2 in)
- Wheel diameter: 56 in (1,400 mm)
- Wheelbase: 62 ft 10 in (19 1/8 m) (two units coupled)
  - Drivers: 16 ft 9 in (5 1/8 m)
- Length
  - Over couplers: 94 ft 4 in (28 3/4 m) (two units coupled)
- Width: 11 ft 0 in (3 3/8 m)
- Height
  - Pantograph: 15 ft 10 in (4 7/8 m)
- Adhesive weight: 284,800 pounds (129,200 kg)
- Loco weight: 371,100 pounds (168,300 kg)
- Electric system/s: 11 kV, 25 Hz single phase AC
- Current pickup(s): Pantograph, 2 off
- Traction motors: 4× Westinghouse 356-A DC (per unit)
- Gear ratio: 18:91
- Train heating: Separate train heating car
Performance figures
- Maximum speed: 45 mph (72 km/h)
- Power output
  - 1 hour: 2,165 hp (1,614 kW) @ 14.4 mph (23.2 km/h)
  - Continuous: 1,830 hp (1,360 kW) @ 15.5 mph (24.9 km/h)
- Tractive effort
  - Starting: 71,000 lbf (320,000 N)
  - 1 hour: 56,250 lbf (250,200 N)
  - Continuous: 44,250 lbf (196,800 N)
- Factor of adh.
  - Starting: 33.5%
Career
- Operators: Great Northern Railway
- Number in class: 10 (worked as 5 coupled pairs)
- Numbers: see table
- Retired: August 1956
- Disposition: All scrapped

The Great Northern Z-1 was a class of ten electric locomotives built for the Great Northern Railway. They were used to work the route through the second Cascade Tunnel. They were built between 1926–1928 by Baldwin Locomotive Works, with Westinghouse electrics, and stayed in service until dieselisation in 1956. Each was of 1,830 horsepower (1,360 kW) with a 1-D-1 wheel arrangement, although they were always used in coupled pairs.

== Electrification ==
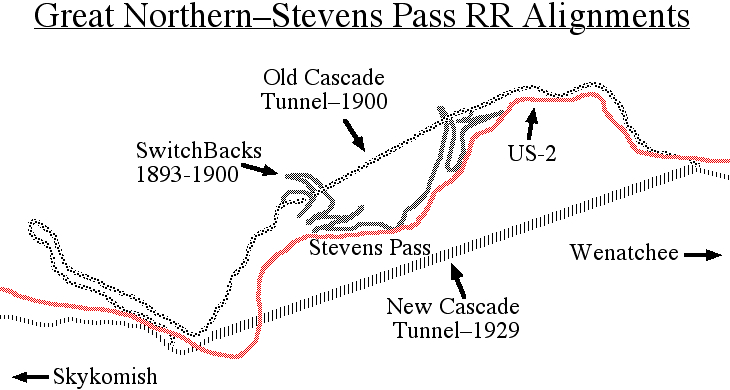

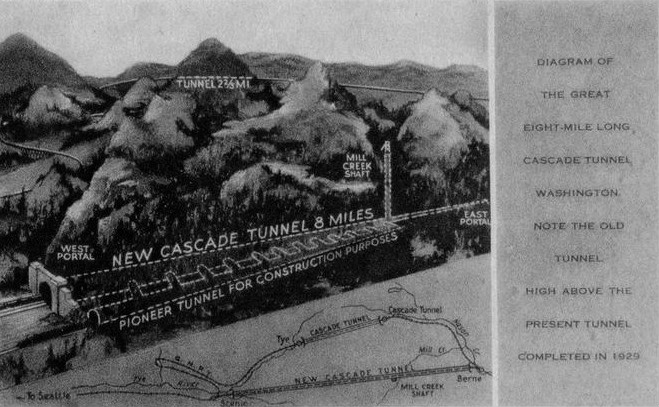

The route West from Wenatchee and on to Seattle needed to cross the Northern Cascades by the Stevens Pass. The initial route, from 1893, had been steeply graded and required a number of switchbacks. As this was also a mountainous area with severe winters, the Cascade Tunnel was built to avoid these and opened in 1900.

The Great Northern Railway was steam-hauled from the outset, later by diesel, and did not generally adopt electric power. However, problems with poor ventilation inside the 2.6-mile-long (4.2 km) tunnel led to an early electrification scheme with four 3-phase AC boxcab locomotives, introduced in 1909. Electrification was only used for a short distance, through the tunnel itself. The electrification scheme here was unusual, although not unique at the time, (Note: Alpine routes in Italy also used it.) using 3-phase AC with two overhead wires and trolley pole current collectors.

An avalanche in 1910 caused 96 fatalities to passengers and crew of a train trapped by snowdrifts at the depot of Wellington, by the West portal of the tunnel. A new tunnel was begun, longer at 7.8 miles (12.6 km), so as to avoid more of the poor winter conditions at each end. This tunnel opened on 12 January 1929 and continues in use today. The Wellington depot was first renamed to Tye, then abandoned and relocated to a new location at Skykomish. In 1926 it was decided that, rather than just working through the tunnel by electric haulage, it would now be used over the whole 73-mile (117 km) from Skykomish to Cascade.

== Design ==
The boxcabs working the first tunnel had used a three-phase electrification system. The new extended electrification was to replace this with a single phase system from Westinghouse, at the same 25 Hz frequency but with the voltage raised from 6.6 kV to 11 kV. This had previously been demonstrated by Westinghouse with the New Haven EP-1 and on the Detroit, Toledo and Ironton Railroad. As there was now only a single overhead wire, current could be collected by diamond pantographs, rather than trolley poles. The insulators and clearances were designed so that the electrification voltage could potentially be doubled to 22 kV in the future.

Baldwin and Westinghouse built a series of locomotives based on similar electric supplies, including a number for the New Haven Railroad.

=== Layout ===
The locomotives were built as pairs of semi-permanently coupled units, and were always used as such. They were boxcab locomotives, with a simple rectangular body over a rigid frame. The four driven axles were carried in this frame, mounted in separate axlebox hornguides for suspension, but with separate traction motors and no mechanical coupling between them, giving a 1′Do1′ arrangement. A control cab was provided at each end, although only one was equipped. The intention had been that, if the locomotives were used as separate units in the future, then the second cab could be equipped to allow for running in the other direction.

=== Electrical equipment ===
Each locomotive was equipped with two pantographs, although only one was used at a time and the other was intended as a spare. As they were used as coupled pairs, the high-voltage pantograph busbar of the two units was linked between them to give a longer connection length to the catenary wire.

A high-voltage transformer in each unit stepped the line voltage down, then supplied a motor-generator set which acted as a rectifier. This use of motor-generators would be seen as a characteristic feature of all Great Northern Railway electrics. The main generator was rated at 600 V DC and 1,500 kW. Additional generators were also provided: a 125 V, 75 kW generator supplied field excitation for the main generator and some auxiliary supplies. A third generator was used to provide traction motor field during regenerative braking, and was only energised when braking. A further winding on the motor acted as an AC generator, used to supply the two traction motor ventilating blowers and a third blower for the main transformer. This provided three-phase AC at first, for starting, and then switched to single phase. A lead-acid battery could power the control and lighting equipment with main power interrupted and was also needed for starting the motor-generator, as this was not self-starting from the AC supply alone.

Regenerative braking had been used from the outset on the 3-phase boxcabs, although this had been dissipated by a load bank at the power station; with the single-phase electrification, it could now be re-used by another train or fed into the supply network.

=== Control equipment ===
Westinghouse HBFR electro-pneumatic multiple-unit control equipment was fitted. This was normally used to operate the locomotives as permanently-coupled pairs, but these pairs could also be coupled together and operated from a single cab.

=== Traction motors ===
Four nose-hung DC traction motors were used, one per axle. Drive was by a motor pinion to a flexible gear on the axle shaft. The motors were always connected in parallel. Many similar four-axle Do locomotives used a switching of the motors from parallel to series or series-parallel circuits for their main control between starting and running. For the Great Northern though, the flexibility of the motor-generator system and its control over the excitation field winding offered better control. The motor field could be operated as either series-wound, or with separate excitation from the generator with either a constant-current or constant-power characteristics.

== Service ==
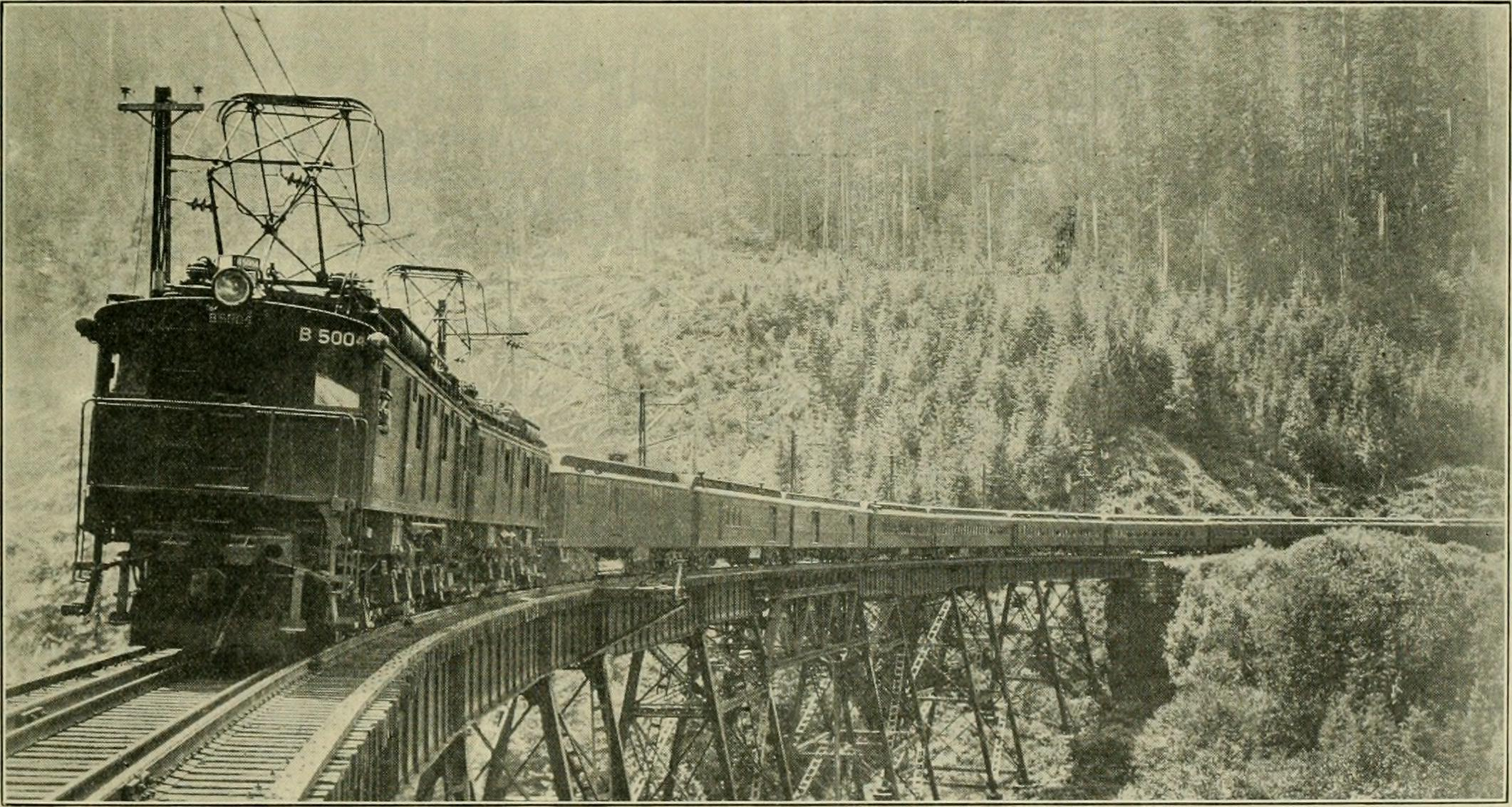
B5004 in 1928

The first pair of Z-1 arrived in December 1926, followed by a second pair a month later, both before the opening of the new tunnel. These first replaced the three-phase boxcabs by rewiring the old tunnel as single-phase. The electrification voltage was switched on 5 March 1927. After this time the boxcabs were withdrawn and the Z-1s took over. These first two pairs of locomotives operated almost the entire service for 1927, with a mileage of around 50,000 each per year. Transit times were reduced from 4 hours with a 2,500-ton eastbound train to 1 hour 45 minutes and a 3,500-ton train. The ends of the electrified section are at a similar elevation of around 750 feet (230 m), with the peak of the line at the Eastern portal of the tunnel at 2,800 feet (850 m). The Eastbound climb is 20 miles (32 km) of a constant 2.2% grade, then a similar distance through the tunnel at 1.56%. The Westbound climb is longer and more varied in gradient, with 50 miles (80 km) between Wenatchee and the tunnel portal, at a maximum of 2.2%. The rated speed of the locomotives was such that they could use their full power when climbing any gradient more than 0.7%

The first of eight Y-1 locomotives arrived late in 1927, and these served alongside the Z-1s. The Y-1 was a more powerful (3,000 horsepower (2,200 kW)) and heavier (518,250 pounds (235,070 kg) 1-C+C-1 (or (1′Co)+(Co1′) as UIC) locomotive, and they were used individually rather than in pairs.

The new Cascade Tunnel was opened on 12 January 1929. All five pairs of Z-1 had been delivered by this time, as had four of the Y-1.

The Great Northern initially used a Pullman Green livery for its electric locomotives. When the W-1 cab unit units arrived in 1947, they were painted in a new Empire Builder scheme of orange and green separated by gold lining. The other electrics were later repainted in these Empire Builder colors, but not the oldest of the stock, the Z-1s.

After WWII, the decision was taken, in common with many of the other US electric railways operating with 1920s equipment, to convert to diesel haulage rather than to renew the electrification system. This would allow straight-through haulage by the same locomotives, rather than interchanging between steam and electric. Improved ventilation was needed for the tunnel though, and a forced ventilation fan house was built around the East portal, powered by the same traction current. This involved providing a closed door to the tunnel portal to control airflow, which opened automatically as a train approached.

All Z-1s were retired and scrapped in August 1956. The other GN electric locomotives were sold on to other railroads.

Service numbers
GN Nº					BLW serial Nº	Build date
1926	1927 (Note: The original four boxcabs were number 5000(1)...5003(1) and were withdrawn in May 1927, freeing up these numbers.)	1928	1929	1946	BLW serial Nº	Build date
5004	A5004		5004A		59168	12/1926
5005	B5004		5004B		59276	12/1926
5006	A5006		5006A		59381	1/1927
5007	B5006		5006B		59382	1/1927
	5002A(1)	5003A	5008A		60443	3/1928
	5002B(1)	5003B	5008B		60444	3/1928
		5007A	5002(2)	5002A(2)	60627	8/1928
		5007B	5003(2)	5002B(2)	60633	8/1928
		5000(2)		5000A	60325	10/1928
		5001(2)		5000B	60365	10/1928
