= Steroidogenic factor 1 =

Protein found in humans

NR5A1
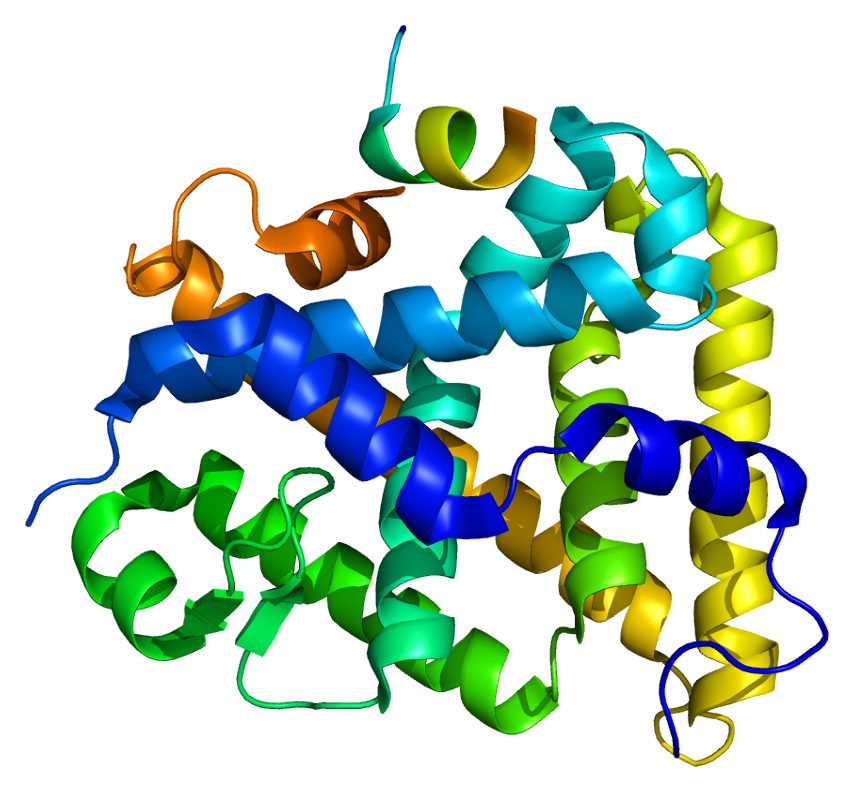

Identifiers
- Aliases: NR5A1, AD4BP, ELP, FTZ1, FTZF1, POF7, SF-1, SF1, SPGF8, SRXY3, hSF-1, nuclear receptor subfamily 5 group A member 1, SRXX4
- External IDs: OMIM: 184757; MGI: 1346833; GeneCards: NR5A1
Available structures
PDB	Ortholog search: PDBe RCSB
PDB	List of PDB id codes 1YOW, 1ZDT, 4QJR, 4QK4

Gene location (Human)
Chr.	Chromosome 9 (human)
Band	9q33.3	Start	124,481,236 bp
Band	9q33.3	End	124,507,420 bp

Gene location (Mouse)
Chr.	Chromosome 2 (mouse)
Band	2 B|2 24.42 cM	Start	38,582,668 bp
Band	2 B|2 24.42 cM	End	38,604,554 bp
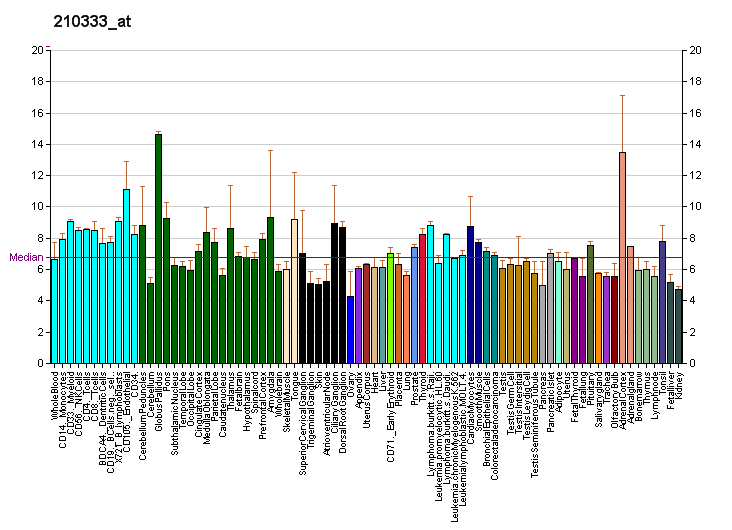
RNA expression pattern
Bgee	Human / Mouse (ortholog); Top expressed in: right adrenal cortex; left adrenal gland; left adrenal cortex; spleen; left ovary; right ovary; anterior pituitary; right testis; left testis; gonad / Top expressed in: adrenal gland; perirhinal cortex; Leydig cell; theca folliculi; entorhinal cortex; Ileal epithelium; choroid plexus of fourth ventricle; CA3 field; Gonadal ridge; lactiferous gland; More reference expression data
BioGPS	More reference expression data
Gene ontology
Molecular function	protein binding; zinc ion binding; lipid binding; double-stranded DNA binding; enzyme binding; transcription factor activity, RNA polymerase II distal enhancer sequence-specific binding; steroid hormone receptor activity; transcription coactivator activity; phospholipid binding; metal ion binding; DNA-binding transcription factor activity; RNA polymerase II cis-regulatory region sequence-specific DNA binding; DNA binding; chromatin binding; RNA polymerase II transcription regulatory region sequence-specific DNA binding; nuclear receptor activity; sequence-specific DNA binding; DNA-binding transcription factor activity, RNA polymerase II-specific; transcription cis-regulatory region binding
Cellular component	nucleoplasm; RNA polymerase II transcription regulator complex; nucleus
Biological process	regulation of transcription by RNA polymerase II; positive regulation of transcription, DNA-templated; regulation of steroid biosynthetic process; hormone metabolic process; luteinization; reproductive process; primary sex determination; tissue development; multicellular organism aging; cell differentiation; maintenance of protein location in nucleus; regulation of transcription, DNA-templated; adrenal gland development; transcription, DNA-templated; steroid hormone mediated signaling pathway; cell-cell signaling; transcription by RNA polymerase II; negative regulation of female gonad development; transcription initiation from RNA polymerase II promoter; positive regulation of male gonad development; intracellular receptor signaling pathway; positive regulation of transcription by RNA polymerase II; sex-determination system; male gonad development; female gonad development; positive regulation of gene expression; hormone-mediated signaling pathway; calcineurin-mediated signaling; response to gonadotropin-releasing hormone; male sex determination
Sources:Amigo / QuickGO
Orthologs
Databases	NCBI: entry; OMA: entry
Species	Human	Mouse
Entrez	2516	26423
Ensembl	ENSG00000136931	ENSMUSG00000026751
UniProt	Q13285	P33242
RefSeq (mRNA)	NM_004959	NM_139051; NM_001316687
RefSeq (protein)	NP_004950; NP_004950.2	NP_001303616; NP_620639
Location (UCSC)	Chr 9: 124.48 – 124.51 Mb	Chr 2: 38.58 – 38.6 Mb
PubMed search
- Wikidata
View/Edit Human	View/Edit Mouse

Steroidogenic factor 1 (SF-1) is a protein that in humans is encoded by the NR5A1 gene. It is a transcription factor of the nuclear receptor family which is involved in sex determination by controlling the activity of genes related to the reproductive glands or gonads and adrenal glands. It was originally identified as a regulator of genes encoding cytochrome P450 steroid hydroxylases, however, further roles in endocrine function have since been discovered.

== Structure ==
The NR5A1 gene encodes a 461-amino acid protein that shares several conserved domains consistent with members of the nuclear receptor subfamily. The N-terminal domain includes two zinc fingers and is responsible for DNA binding via specific recognition of target sequences. Variations of AGGTCA DNA motifs allows SF-1 to interact with the major groove of the DNA helix and monomerically bind. Following binding, trans-activation of target genes depends on recruitment of co-activators such as SRC-1, GRIP1, PNRC, or GCN5. Other critical domains of SF-1 include a proline-rich hinge region, ligand-binding domain, and a C-terminal activation domain for transcriptional interactions. A 30-amino acid extension of the DNA-binding domain known as the A-box stabilizes monomeric binding by acting as a DNA anchor. The hinge region can undergo post-transcriptional and translational modifications such as phosphorylation by cAMP-dependent kinase, that further enhance stability and transcriptional activity.

SF-1 is considered an orphan receptor as high-affinity naturally occurring ligands have yet to be identified.

=== Homology ===
Analysis of mouse SF-1 cDNA revealed sequence similarities with Drosophila fushi tarazu factor I (FTZ-F1) which regulates the fushi tarazu homeobox gene. Several other FTZ-F1 homologs have been identified that implicate high level of sequence conservation among vertebrates and invertebrates. For example, SF-1 cDNA shares an identical 1017 base-pair sequence with embryonal long terminal repeat-binding protein (ELP) cDNA isolated from embryonal carcinoma cells, differing only in their terminal ends.

== Expression ==
=== Adult steroidogenic tissue ===
SF-1 expression is localized to adult steroidogenic tissues correlating with known expression profiles of steroid hydroxylases. Using in situ hybridization with SF-1 cRNA specific probe detected gene transcripts in adrenocortical cells, Leydig cells, and ovarian theca and granulosa cells. SF-1 specific antibody studies confirmed expression profile of SF-1 in rats and humans corresponding to sites of transcript detection.

=== Embryonic steroidogenic tissue ===
Genetic sex in mammals is determined by the presence or absence of the Y chromosome at fertilization. Sexually dimorphic development of embryonic gonads into testes or ovaries is activated by the SRY gene product. Sexual differentiation is then directed by hormones produced by embryonic testes, the presence of ovaries, or complete absence of gonads. SF-1 transcripts initially localize to the urogenital ridge before SF-1 expressing cells resolve into distinct adrenocortical and gonadal precursors that ultimately give rise to adrenal cortex and gonads.

SF-1 transcripts precede the onset of SRY expression in the fetal testes hinting at gonadal developmental role. SRY influences the differentiation of the fetal testes into distinct compartments: testicular cords and interstitial region containing Leydig cells. Increase in SF-1 protein and detection in the steroidogenic Leydig cells and testicular cords coincides with development.

However, in the ovaries, gonadal sexual differentiation is facilitated by reductions in SF-1 transcript and protein. SF-1 levels is strongly expressed at the onset of follicular development in theca and granulosa cells which precedes expression of the aromatase enzyme responsible for estrogen biosynthesis.

=== Other sites ===
Embryonic mouse SF-1 transcripts have been discovered to localize within regions of the developing diencephalon and subsequently in the ventromedial hypothalamic nucleus (VMH) suggesting roles beyond steroidogenic maintenance.

RT-PCR approaches have detected transcripts of mice FTZ-F1 gene in the placenta and spleen; and SF-1 transcripts in the human placenta.

== Post-translational regulation ==
Transcription capacity of SF-1 can be influenced by post-translational modification. Specifically, phosphorylation of serine 203 is mediated by cyclin-dependent kinase 7. Mutations to CDK7 prevent interaction with the basal transcription factor, TFIIH, and formation of CDK-activating kinase complex. This inactivity has shown to repress phosphorylation of SF-1 and SF-1-dependent transcription.

== Function ==
SF-1 is a critical regulator of reproduction, regulating the transcription of key genes involved in sexual development and reproduction, most notably StAR and P450_{SCC}. It can form a transcriptional complex with TDF to up-regulate transcription of the Sox9 gene. Its targets include genes at every level of the hypothalamic-pituitary-gonadal axis, as well as many genes involved in gonadal and adrenal steroidogenesis.

SF-1 has been identified as a transcriptional regulator for an array of different genes related to sex determination and differentiation, reproduction, and metabolism via binding to their promoters. For example, SF-1 controls expression of Amh gene in Sertoli cells, whereby the presence or absence of the gene product affects development of Müllerian structures. Increased AMH protein levels leads to regression of such structures. Leydig cells express SF-1 to regulate transcription of steroidogenesis and testosterone biosynthesis genes causing virilization in males.

== Target genes ==
=== Steroidogenic cells ===
First identified as a regulator of steroid hydroxylases within adrenocortical cells, studies aimed to define localization and expression of SF-1 have since revealed enzyme activity within other steroidogenic cells.

Table 1. Example of genes regulated by SF-1 in steroidogenic cells
species	Gene	Cell/Tissue
rat	P450scc	granulosa cells
mouse	P450scc	Y1 adrenocortical cells
bovine	Oxytocin	ovary
mouse	StAR	MA-10 Leydig cells

=== Sertoli cells ===
The Müllerian inhibiting substance (MIS or AMH) gene within Sertoli cells contains a conserved motif identical to the optimal binding sequence for SF-1. Gel mobility shift experiments and use of SF-1-specific polyclonal antibodies established binding complexes of SF-1 to MIS, however, other studies suggest the MIS promoter is repressed and not activated by SF-1 binding.

=== Gonadotropes ===
Gonadotrope-specific element, or GSE, in the promoter of the gene encoding α-subunit of glycoproteins (α-GSU) resembles the SF-1 binding sires. Studies have implicated SF-1 as an upstream regulator of a collection of genes required for gonadotrope function via GSE.

=== VMH ===
SF-1 knockout mice displayed profound defects in the VMH suggesting potential target genes at the site. Target genes have yet to be identified due to difficulties in studying gene expression in neurons.

== SF-1 gene knockout ==
Several approaches used targeted gene disruption in mouse embryonic stem cells with the aim of identifying potential target genes of SF-1. The different targeting strategies include disruption to exons encoding for the zinc finger motif, disruption of a 3’-exon and targeted mutation of the initiator methionine. The corresponding observed phenotypic effects on endocrine development and function were found to be quite similar.

Sf-1 knockout mice displayed diminished corticosterone levels while maintaining elevated ACTH levels. Observed morphological changes and DNA fragmentation was consistent with apoptosis and structural regression resulting in the death of all mice within 8 days after birth.

Sf-1 function was determined to be necessary for development of primary steroidogenic tissue as evidenced by complete lack of adrenal and gonadal glands in the knockout. Male to female sex reversal of genitalia was also observed.

== Clinical significance ==
Mutations in NR5A1 can produce intersex genitals, absence of puberty, and infertility. It is one cause of arrest of ovarian function in women <40 years of age, which occurs in 1% of all women.

=== Adrenal and gonadal failure ===
Two SF-1 variants associated with primary adrenal failure and complete gonadal dysgenesis have been reported as caused by NR5A1 mutations. One reported case was found to have de novo heterozygous p.G35E change to the P-box domain. The affected region allows for DNA binding specificity through interactions with regulatory response elements of target genes. This p.G35E change may have a mild competitive or dominant negative effect on transactivation resulting in severe gonadal defects and adrenal dysfunction. Similarly, homozygous p.R92Q change within the A-box interfered with monomeric binding stability and reduced functional activity. This change requires mutations to both allele to display phenotypic effects as heterozygous carriers showed normal adrenal function.

Missense, in-frame and frameshift mutations of NR5A1 have been found in families with 46,XY disorders of sex development, 46,XX gonadal dysgenesis and 46,XX primary ovarian insufficiency. 46,XY individuals may have ambiguous or female genitals. Individuals of either karyotype may not enter puberty, although expression of the phenotype, penetrance, fertility, and modes of inheritance can vary. Some mutations are dominant, some are recessive.

=== 46, XY disorders of sex development ===
Heterozygous NR5A1 changes are emerging as a frequent contributor in 46, XY complete gonadal dysgenesis. In affected individuals, sexual development does not match their chromosomal makeup. Males, despite having 46, XY karyotype, develop female external genitalia, as well as uterus and fallopian tubes, along with gonadal defects rendering them nonfunctional. NR5A1 mutations have also been linked to partial gonadal dysgenesis, whereby affected individuals have ambiguous genitalia, urogenital sinus, absent or rudimentary Müllerian structures, and other abnormalities.

Typically, these genetic changes are frameshift, nonsense, or missense mutations that alter DNA-binding and gene transcription. While many are de novo, one-third of cases have been maternally inherited in a similar manner as X-linked inheritance. Furthermore, one report of homozygous missense mutation p.D293N within the ligand-binding domain of SF-1 revealed autosomal recessive inheritance was also possible.

=== Infertility ===
Analysis of NR5A1 in men with non-obstructive male factor infertility found those with gene changes had more severe forms of infertility and lower testosterone levels. These changes affected the hinge region of SF-1. Further studies are required to establish the relationship between SF-1 changes and infertility.

== Additional interactions ==
SF-1 has also been shown to interact with:

- Beta-catenin
- DAX1
- NRIP1
- SOX9
- TRERF1.
