= Y1 =

Y1 has several uses including:

- Boeing Y1, the anticipated replacement for the company's existing Boeing 737 airliner
- Great Northern Y-1, an electric locomotive used by the Great Northern Railway.
- Y1 adrenocortical cell, a mouse cell line
- Y1 (railcar), a Swedish-made diesel multiple unit train
- LNER Class Y1, a class of British steam locomotives
- Y1 (tobacco), a genetically altered tobacco

and also :

- Blue Air IATA airline code
- y1, Yellow seed 1, a sorghum gene implied in the phlobaphene pigments pathway

== See also ==
- 1Y (disambiguation)
