= MA10 =

MA-10 may refer to:

- Massachusetts's 10th congressional district
- Massachusetts Route 10
- Mercury-Atlas 10, a cancelled spaceflight of Project Mercury
- MA-10 cell, a Leydig cell tumour cell line
