= Scenic Subdivision =

Railway line in Washington state

The Scenic Subdivision or Scenic Sub is a railroad line running about 155 miles (249 km) from Seattle, Washington to Wenatchee, Washington. It is operated by BNSF Railway as part of their Northern Transcon. This route includes the Cascade Tunnel, as well as the 1893 site of the "last spike" near Scenic, Washington, which marked the completion for the Great Northern Railway transcontinental railway line built by James J. Hill.

Current operations are limited to 30 trains per day due to ventilation capacity with the Cascade Tunnel.

== Description ==
Traveling east from the King Street Station in Seattle, the main line of the BNSF heads north through the Great Northern Tunnel under downtown Seattle. After exiting the tunnel, the main line continues north through the Interbay neighborhood and the Balmer Railyard. The line then crosses the Lake Washington Ship Canal on the Salmon Bay Bridge and passes through the Ballard neighborhood. The line passes through Golden Gardens Park in Ballard, which has been the site of several incidents involving pedestrians crossing the tracks. Several accidents proved fatal.

The main line then continues north along the shore of Puget Sound through the cities of Edmonds and Mukilteo, past Rucker Hill, near downtown Everett, to the old Everett Station, built by the Great Northern Railway in 1900. This section of the main line from Seattle to Everett is mostly double track with BNSF planning to double track the remaining single track in conjunction with changes planned by Sound Transit. From the old Everett Station the main line becomes single track making a nearly 180 degree turn through a partially covered cut through downtown Everett to the new Everett Station.

From the new station, the main line heads southeast along the Snohomish River through the cities of Snohomish and Monroe. From Monroe, the main line follows the Skykomish River through the towns of Index and Skykomish to the western portal of the current Cascade Tunnel. East of Everett, the route is single track except for passing sidings. To the east of Gold Bar, the route is mainly located on narrow ledges as it crosses back and forth across the Skykomish, South Fork of the Skykomish, and the Foss Rivers. A steep ascent/descent (2.2%) starts in the vicinity of eastern Skykomish and continues through the tunnel to Merritt. At Skykomish are facilities for turning equipment, mainly for snow fighting. Skykomish was also the end of electrification when the line was electrified from Wenatchee to Skykomish in 1928-1929. In 1928, a new electrical power plant was sited there as well but is now demolished.

After summiting the Cascade Range near Berne, the line starts a steep (2.2%) descent at a 2.2% grade, passing through the Gaynor Tunnel, and on to Merritt. Merritt is the site of a maintenance base with a turning facility for snow fighting equipment. To the east of Winton was the junction with the original right of way, and a 1928 line relocation project called the Chumstick Cutoff. This project included the construction of the Winton, Swede and Chumstick Tunnels. U.S. Route 2 is now located on the original right of way between this point and Leavenworth. Utilizing the Chumstick Cutoff, the line now goes down the Chumstick Valley, after going through the Winton and Swede Tunnels, crossing the Wenatchee River and then passing through the Chumstick Tunnel.

Up until the building of the Chumstick Cutoff and the current Cascade Tunnel, and the electrification of a majority of the subdivision in 1927–1929, Leavenworth was the division point. This was moved to its current location in Wenatchee in 1928–1929.

Starting near Leavenworth, the current line follows the Wenatchee River valley to the city of Wenatchee and the Columbia River. This area has a historic past, and is known for fruit production, particularly apples, pears and cherries. The railroad follows the river through countless fruit groves and passes the communities of Peshastin, Dryden, Cashmere, and Monitor, before arriving in the Wenatchee area. At Wenatchee, there is a small industrial base served by the railroad as well as a yard (Appleyard) used mainly during the fruit harvest season.

== History ==
The Coast Line was reconstructed in 1907 and 1908 to add a seawall that protects the tracks from the high tide of Puget Sound. The section between Gold Bar and Index was rebuilt in the early 1960s to eliminate curves and increase train speeds. The changes resulted in a blind hill at an at-grade crossing in Index, where the town was cut off by a new, wider curve. The project was completed in late 1967 at a cost of $7.5 million.

The section between Seattle and Everett was the site of several fatal collisions with pedestrians in the 1970s due to its location along the shore. The King and Snohomish county governments constructed several pedestrian overpasses to provide access to public beaches and shorelands over the tracks. The section has also been the site of landslides that caused prolonged closures for passenger and freight service. The Washington State Department of Transportation, Sound Transit, and BNSF funded $16.1 million in improvements, including retaining walls, slope stabilization, and landslide detection, beginning in 2014.

== Gallery ==
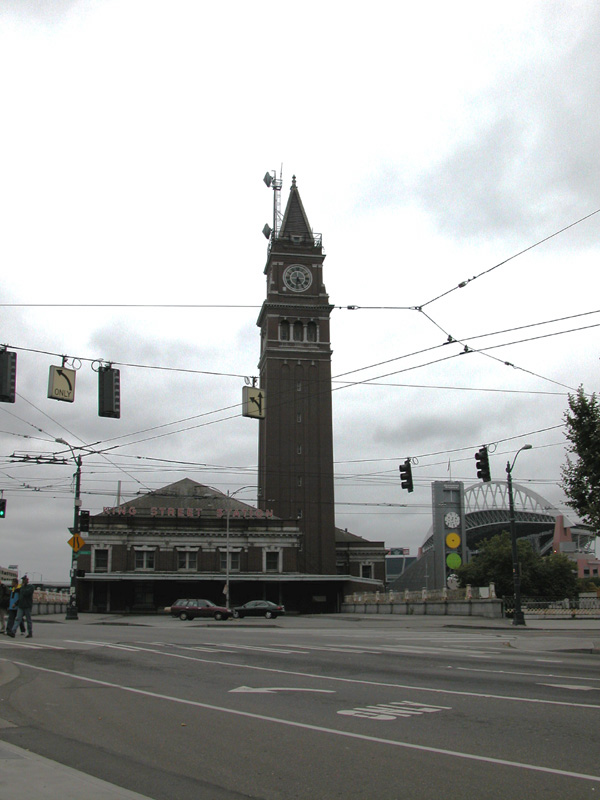
King Street Station, Seattle

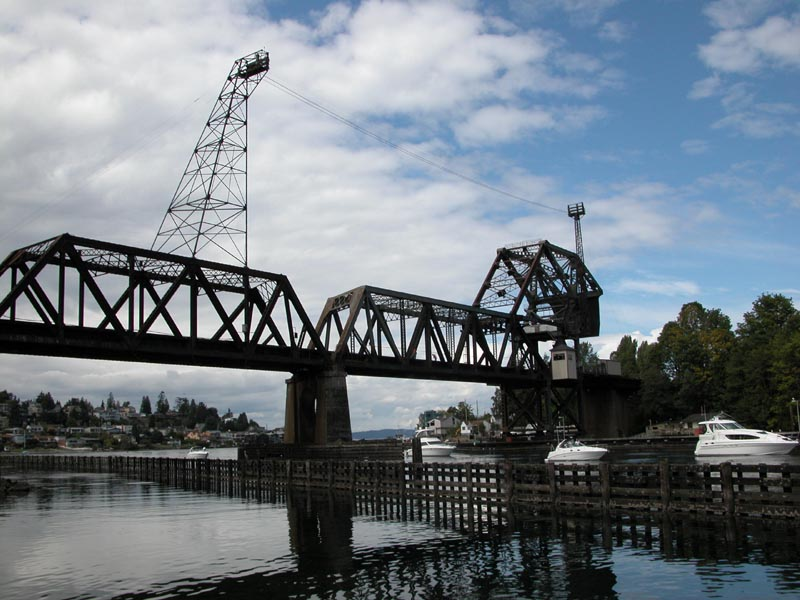
Salmon Bay Bridge, Seattle

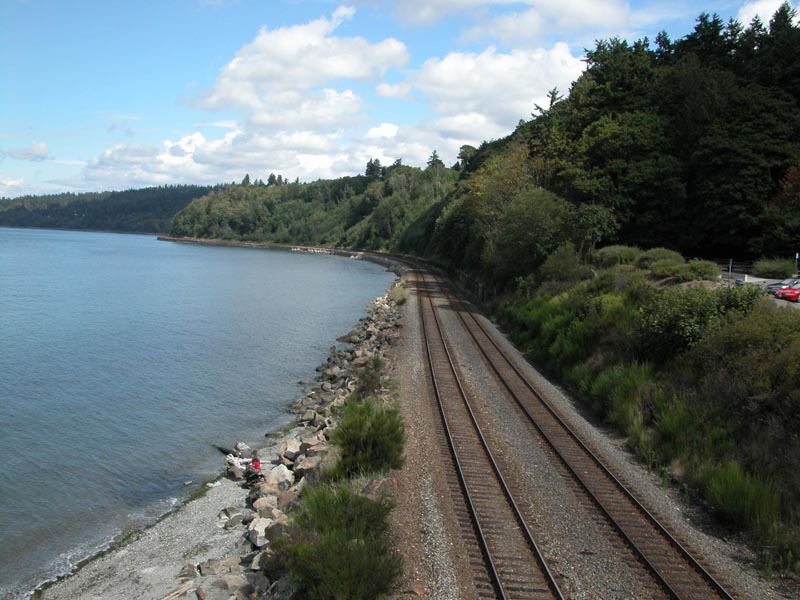
Main line heading north out of Seattle along the shore of Puget Sound

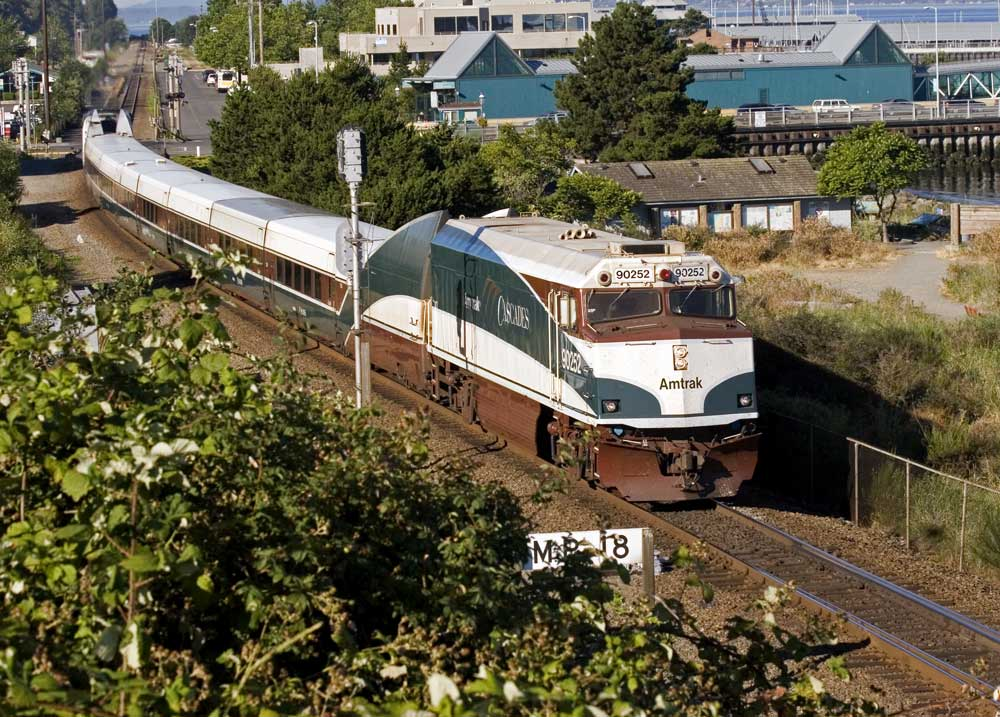
Amtrak Cascades leaving Edmonds Station

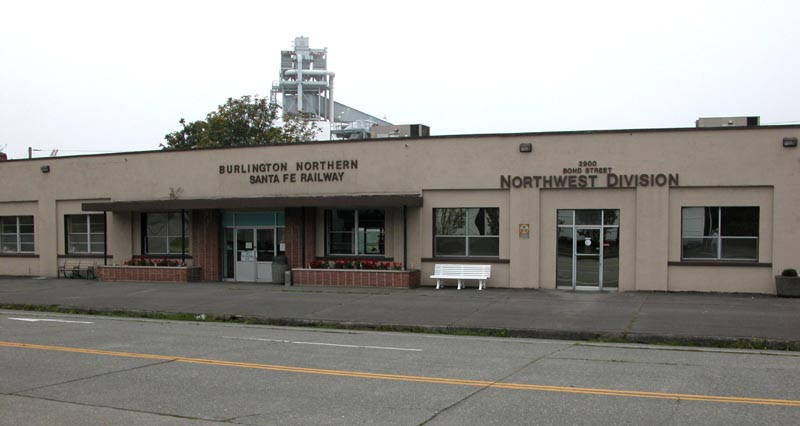
The former Everett Amtrak station, built in 1910 and closed in 2002

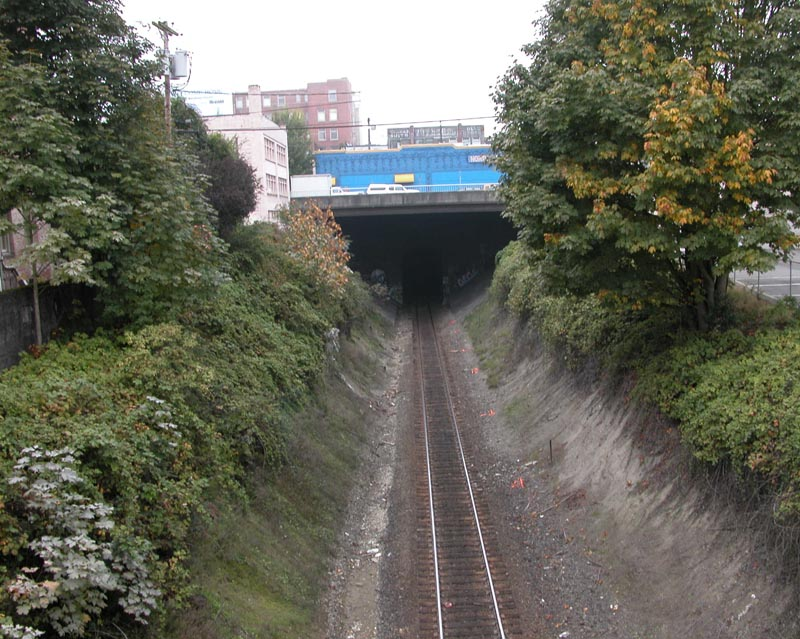
Covered cut under downtown Everett (eastern portal)

The current Everett Station, built in 2002

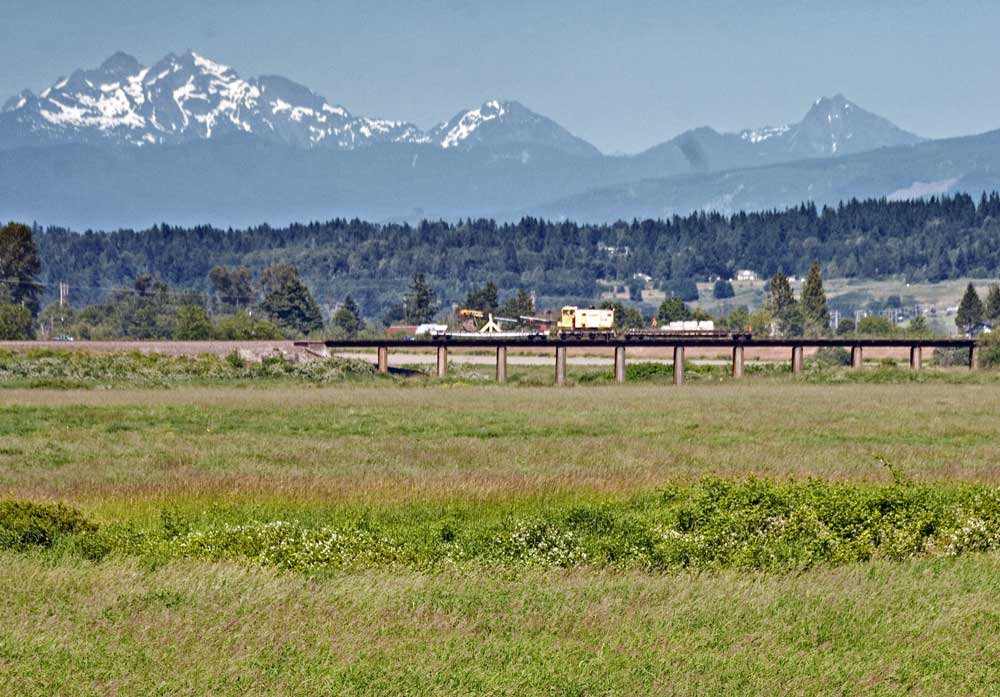
The flatlands east of Everett

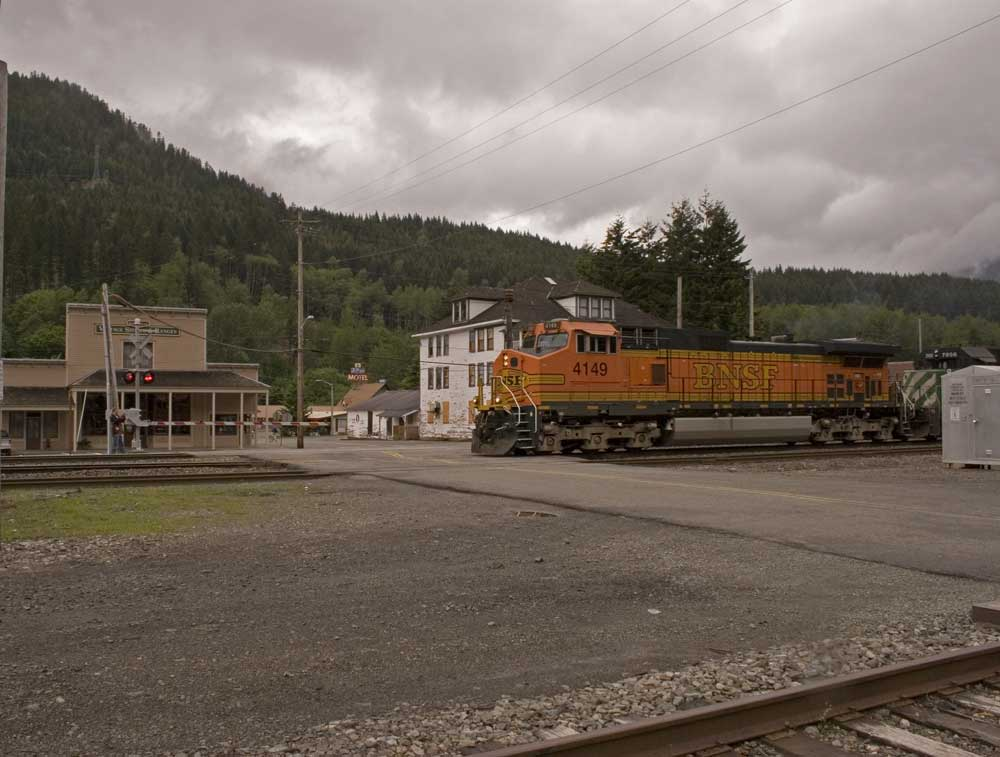
The city of Skykomish

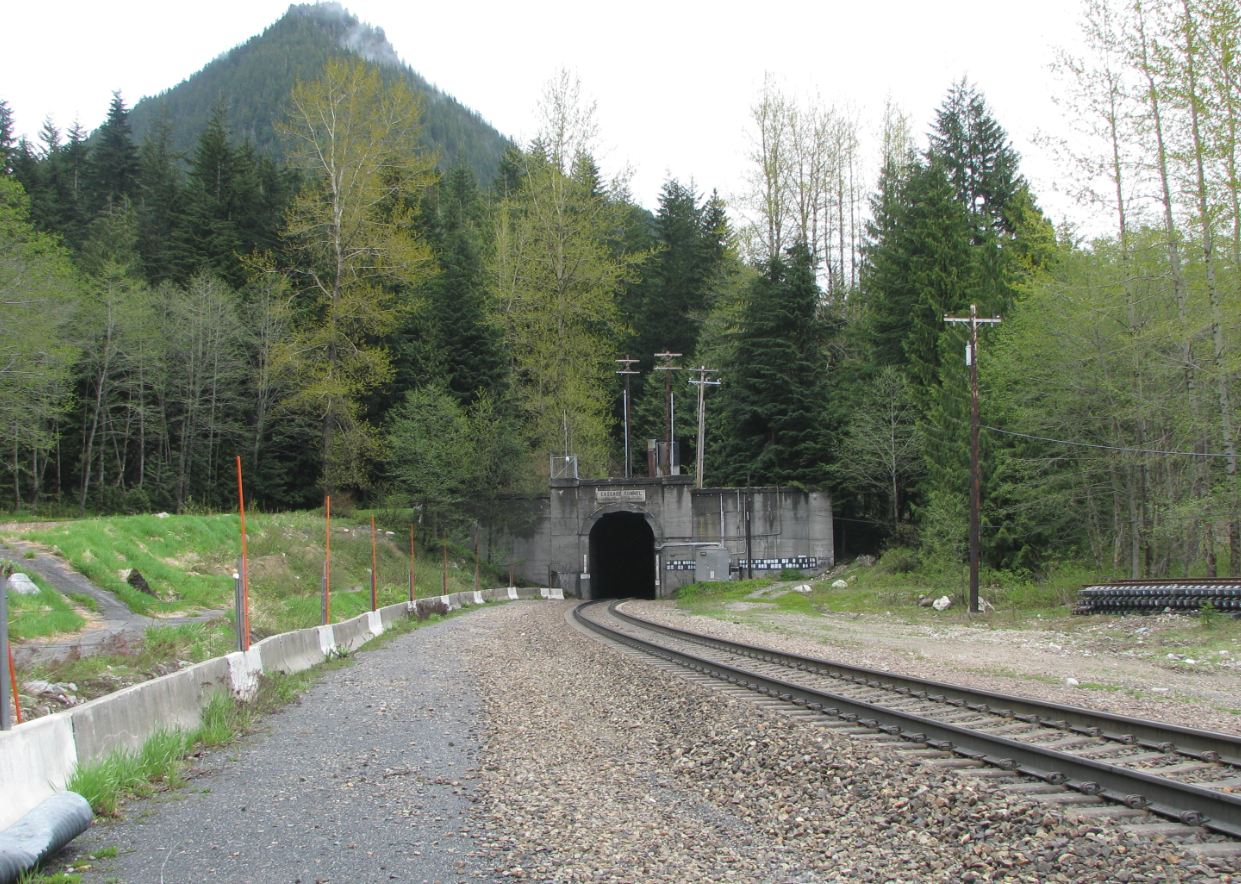
The west portal of the Cascade Tunnel

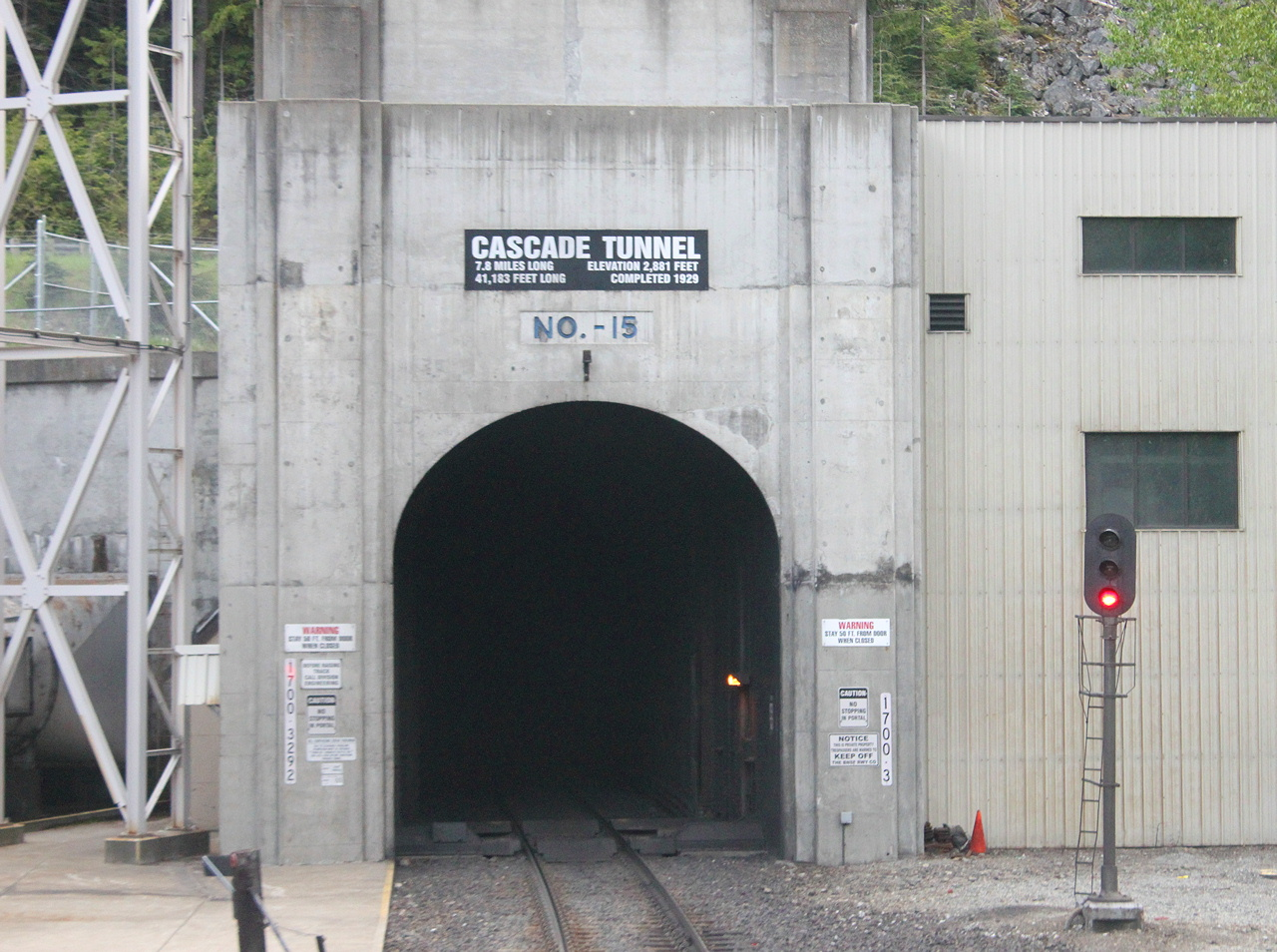
The east portal of the Cascade Tunnel
