= 1Y =

1Y or 1-Y may refer to:

- UH-1Y; see H-1 upgrade program
  - Bell UH-1Y Venom
- SSH 1Y (WA); see Washington State Route 532
- 1Y-J, a model of Toyota Y engine
- 1Y, IATA code for Sun Air (Sudan)
- 1Y, IATA code for Electronic Data Systems
- 1-Y classification in the U.S. Selective Service System, no longer in use

== See also ==
- Year
- Y1 (disambiguation)
