= PNRC1 =

Protein-coding gene in the species Homo sapiens

Identifiers
- Aliases: PNRC1, B4-2, PNAS-145, PROL2, PRR2, proline rich nuclear receptor coactivator 1
- External IDs: OMIM: 606714; MGI: 1917838; GeneCards: PNRC1

Gene location (Human)
Chr.	Chromosome 6 (human)
Band	6q15	Start	89,080,751 bp
Band	6q15	End	89,085,160 bp

Gene location (Mouse)
Chr.	Chromosome 4 (mouse)
Band	4|4 A5	Start	33,245,423 bp
Band	4|4 A5	End	33,290,163 bp
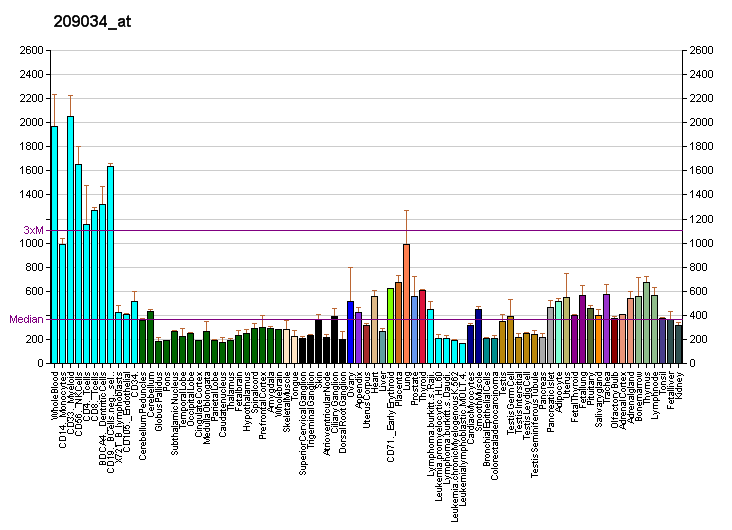
RNA expression pattern
Bgee	Human / Mouse (ortholog); Top expressed in: Achilles tendon; gastric mucosa; left uterine tube; gastrocnemius muscle; left ovary; muscle of thigh; right ovary; tibial arteries; epithelium of colon; gallbladder / Top expressed in: left lung lobe; medial ganglionic eminence; granulocyte; lymph node; mesenteric lymph nodes; lacrimal gland; molar; thoracic diaphragm; submandibular gland; digastric muscle; More reference expression data
BioGPS	More reference expression data
Gene ontology
Molecular function	protein binding
Cellular component	P-body; nucleus
Biological process	regulation of transcription, DNA-templated; transcription, DNA-templated; nuclear-transcribed mRNA catabolic process, nonsense-mediated decay; deadenylation-independent decapping of nuclear-transcribed mRNA
Sources:Amigo / QuickGO
Orthologs
Databases	NCBI: entry; OMA: entry
Species	Human	Mouse
Entrez	10957	108767
Ensembl	ENSG00000146278	ENSMUSG00000040128
UniProt	Q12796; Q49A59	Q3TWH3
RefSeq (mRNA)	NM_006813	NM_001033225
RefSeq (protein)	NP_006804	NP_001028397
Location (UCSC)	Chr 6: 89.08 – 89.09 Mb	Chr 4: 33.25 – 33.29 Mb
PubMed search
- Wikidata
View/Edit Human	View/Edit Mouse

Proline-rich nuclear receptor coactivator 1 is a protein that, in humans, is encoded by the PNRC1 gene.

== Function ==
PNRC1 functions as a coactivator for several nuclear receptors including AR, ERα, ERRα, ERRγ, GR, SF1, PR, TR, RAR and RXR. The interaction between PNRC1 with nuclear receptors occurs through the SH3 domain of PNRC1.
