= TRERF1 =

Protein-coding gene in the species Homo sapiens

Identifiers
- Aliases: TRERF1, BCAR2, HSA277276, RAPA, TREP132, TReP-132, dJ139D8.5, transcriptional regulating factor 1
- External IDs: OMIM: 610322; MGI: 2442086; GeneCards: TRERF1

Gene location (Human)
Chr.	Chromosome 6 (human)
Band	6p21.1	Start	42,224,931 bp
Band	6p21.1	End	42,452,051 bp

Gene location (Mouse)
Chr.	Chromosome 17 (mouse)
Band	17|17 C	Start	47,451,801 bp
Band	17|17 C	End	47,672,883 bp
RNA expression pattern
Bgee	Human / Mouse (ortholog); Top expressed in: mucosa of paranasal sinus; cartilage tissue; Brodmann area 23; parietal pleura; middle temporal gyrus; blood; pancreatic ductal cell; buccal mucosa cell; primary visual cortex; gums / Top expressed in: Rostral migratory stream; pyramidal layer of hippocampus; molecular layer of dentate gyrus; nucleus accumbens; olfactory tubercle; dorsal striatum; temporal lobe; medullary collecting duct; substantia nigra; amygdala; More reference expression data
BioGPS	n/a
Gene ontology
Molecular function	DNA-binding transcription factor activity; metal ion binding; transcription coregulator activity; DNA binding; DNA binding, bending; nuclear receptor coactivator activity; transcription factor binding; nucleic acid binding; DNA-binding transcription factor activity, RNA polymerase II-specific
Cellular component	nucleus; histone deacetylase complex; transcription regulator complex; nucleoplasm; nucleolus; cytosol
Biological process	multicellular organism development; cholesterol catabolic process; regulation of transcription, DNA-templated; homeostatic process; steroid biosynthetic process; positive regulation of transcription, DNA-templated; transcription, DNA-templated; regulation of hormone biosynthetic process; regulation of transcription by RNA polymerase II
Sources:Amigo / QuickGO
Orthologs
Databases	NCBI: entry; OMA: entry
Species	Human	Mouse
Entrez	55809	224829
Ensembl	ENSG00000124496	ENSMUSG00000064043
UniProt	Q96PN7	Q8BXJ2
RefSeq (mRNA)	NM_001297573; NM_018415; NM_033501; NM_033502; NM_001391983 NM_001391984; NM_001395490	NM_001097623; NM_172622
RefSeq (protein)	NP_001284502; NP_277037	NP_001091092; NP_766210
Location (UCSC)	Chr 6: 42.22 – 42.45 Mb	Chr 17: 47.45 – 47.67 Mb
PubMed search
- Wikidata
View/Edit Human	View/Edit Mouse

Transcriptional-regulating factor 1 is a protein that in humans is encoded by the TRERF1 gene.

This gene encodes a zinc-finger transcriptional regulating protein that interacts with CBP/p300 to regulate the human gene CYP11A1.

== Interactions ==
TRERF1 has been shown to interact with Steroidogenic factor 1, EP300 and CREB-binding protein.
