= Wellington, Washington =

Ghost town in Washington (state)

- Ghost town
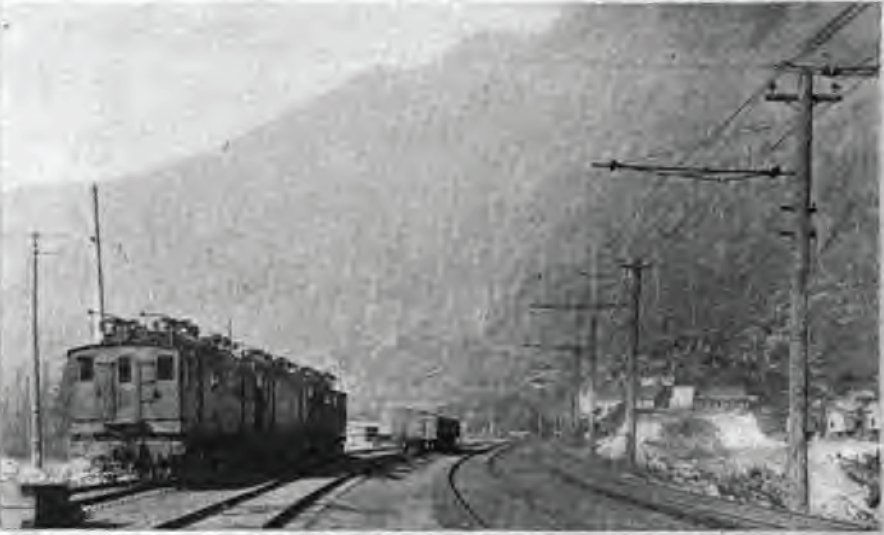
- Wellington depot before the 1910 avalanche

- Location within Washington (state) Location within the United States
- Coordinates: 47°44′58″N 121°07′10″W
- Country: United States
- State: Washington
- County: King
- Founded: 1893
- Time zone: UTC-8 (Pacific (PST))
  - Summer (DST): UTC-7 (PDT)

Wellington (later known as Tye) was a small unincorporated railroad community in the northwest United States, on the Great Northern Railway in northeastern King County, Washington.

Founded in 1893, it was located in the Cascade Range at the west portal of the original Cascade Tunnel under Stevens Pass. It was the site of the 1910 Wellington avalanche, the deadliest in U.S. history, in which 96 people died.

== 1910 Avalanche ==
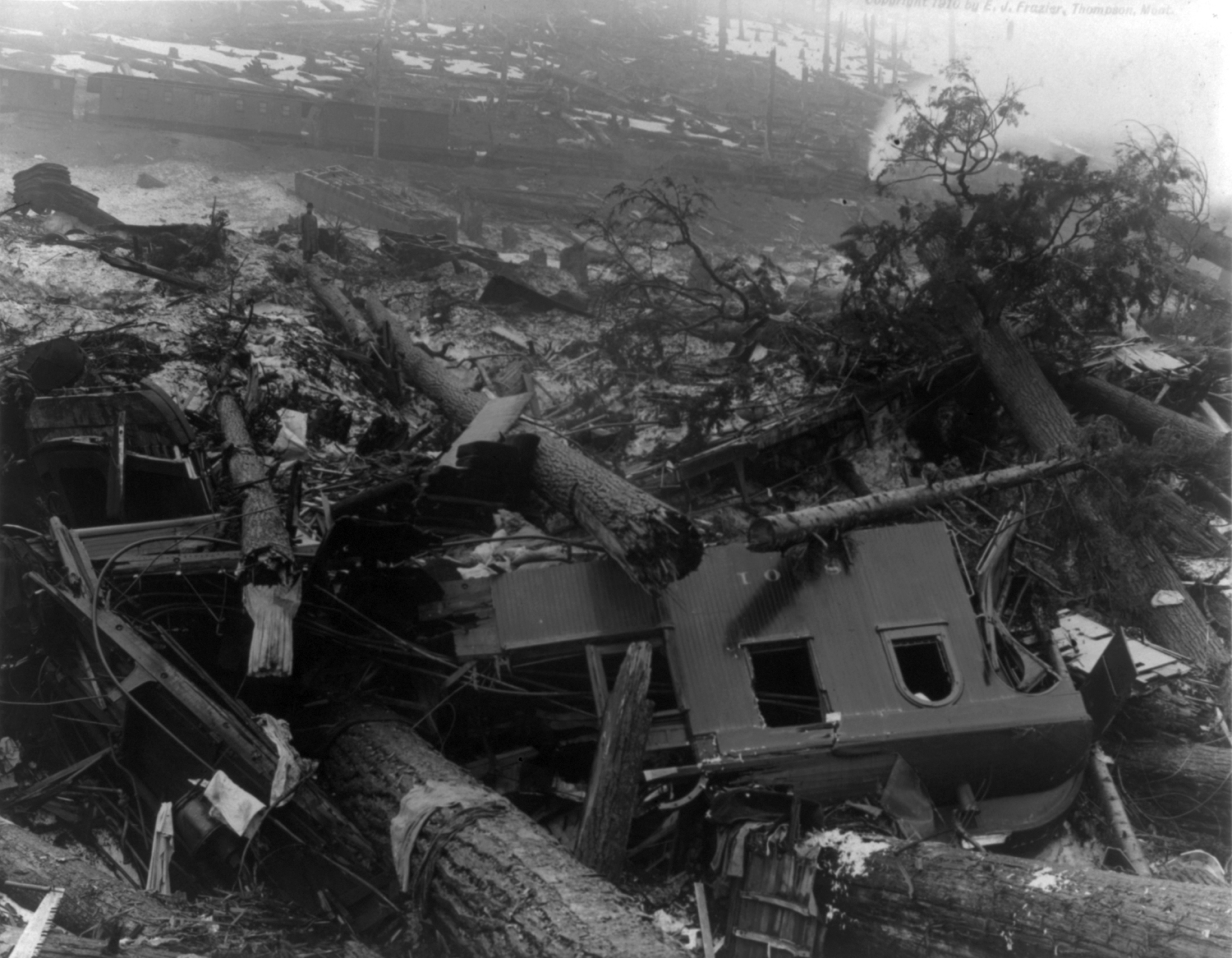
Train wreckage caused by the avalanche

The Wellington avalanche was the deadliest avalanche in the history of the United States, marked by the total death count of 96.

For nine days at the end of February 1910, the Wellington area experienced a severe blizzard. Up to a foot (30 cm) of snow fell every hour, and, on the worst day, eleven feet (340 cm) of snow fell. Two trains, a passenger train and a mail train, both bound from Spokane to Seattle, were trapped in the depot. Snow plows were present at Wellington and others were sent to help, but they could not penetrate the snow accumulations and repeated avalanches along the stretch of tracks between Scenic and Leavenworth.

Late on February 28, the snow stopped and was replaced by rain and a warm wind. Just after 1 a.m. on March 1, as a result of a lightning strike, a slab of snow broke loose from the side of Windy Mountain during a thunderstorm. A ten-foot high mass of snow, half a mile long and a quarter of a mile wide, fell toward the town. A forest fire had recently ravaged the slopes above the town, leaving very little to impede the avalanche.

The avalanche missed the Bailets Hotel (which also housed the town's general store and post office), but hit the railroad depot. Most of the passengers and crew were asleep aboard their trains. The impact threw the trains 150 feet (45 m) downhill and into the Tye River valley. Ninety-six people were killed, including 35 passengers, 58 Great Northern employees on the trains, and three railroad employees in the depot. Twenty-three people survived; they were pulled from the wreckage by railroad employees who immediately rushed from the hotel and other buildings where they had been staying. However, the work was then abandoned because of the adverse weather conditions, and it was not until 21 weeks later (late July) that the last of the bodies were retrieved.

This was not the only avalanche in the region that winter. Three days later, 63 railroad workers were killed in the Rogers Pass avalanche nearby in British Columbia.

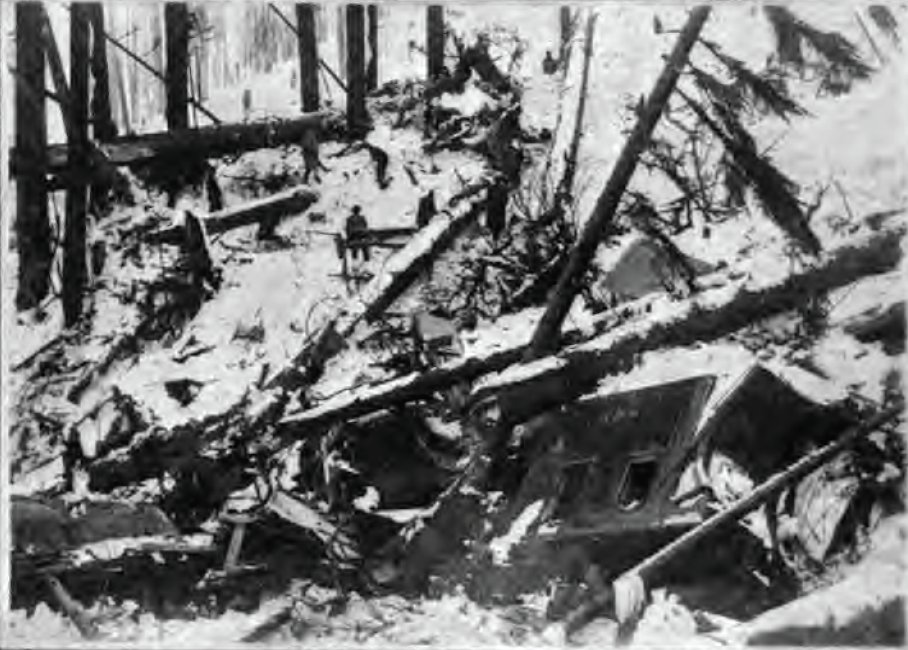
Debris — including wrecked train cars — resulting from the avalanche.

== Aftermath ==
Wellington was quietly renamed "Tye" during October because of the unpleasant associations of the old name. In the same month, the Great Northern Railway began construction of concrete snow sheds to shelter the nearby tracks. The depot was closed when the second Cascade Tunnel was completed in 1929; the town was then abandoned and it eventually burned.

Considered a ghost town, the old track and snow sheds remain and have been preserved as part of the Iron Goat Trail, which is accessible from U.S. Highway 2 near Stevens Pass or near Scenic, ten miles east of Skykomish.

== See also ==
- 1910 Rogers Pass avalanche
- Frank Slide
- List of ghost towns in Washington
