= Cascade Tunnel =

Rail tunnels in Washington state, US

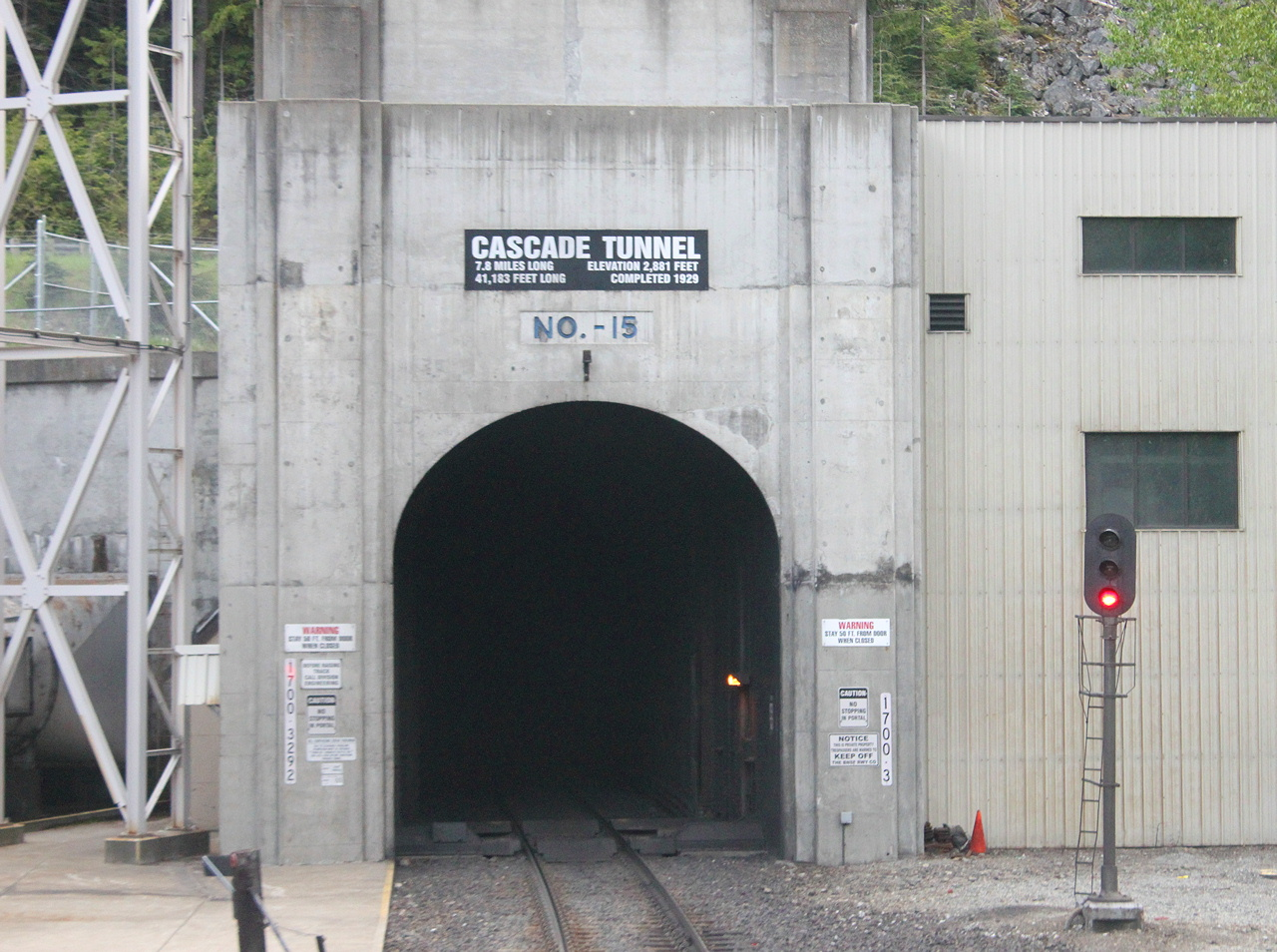
- The eastern portal of Cascade Tunnel in 2012
- Interactive map of Cascade Tunnel

Overview
- Line: BNSF Scenic Subdivision (formerly Burlington Northern and Great Northern)
- Location: Stevens Pass, Washington, U.S.
- Coordinates: 47°44′33″N 121°04′10″W
- Status: Active
- Crosses: Cascade Range, near Stevens Pass

Operation
- Opened: 12 January 1929, 97 years ago
- Traffic: Railroad
- Character: Primarily freight service Some passenger service (Amtrak)

Technical
- Length: 7.80 miles (12.55 km)
- No. of tracks: Single
- Track gauge: 4 ft 8 1/2 in (1,435 mm) standard gauge
- Max elevation: 2,881 feet (880 m)

Route map
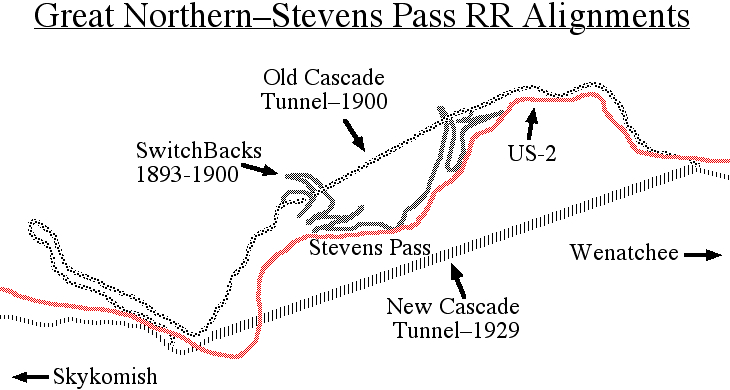

The Cascade Tunnel refers to two railroad tunnels, its original tunnel and its replacement, in the northwest United States, east of the Seattle metropolitan area in the Cascade Range of Washington, at Stevens Pass. It is approximately 65 miles (105 km) east of Everett, with both portals adjacent to U.S. Route 2. Both single-track tunnels were constructed by the Great Northern Railway.

The first was 2.63 miles (4.23 km) in length and opened in 1900 to avoid problems caused by heavy winter snowfalls on the original line that had eight zig zags (switchbacks). The current tunnel is 7.8 miles (12.6 km) in length and entered service in early 1929, approximately 1.5 miles (2.4 km) south of and 500 feet (150 m) lower in elevation than the original. The present east portal is nearly four miles (6.5 km) east of the original and is at 2,881 feet (878 m) above sea level, 1,180 feet (360 m) below the pass. The tunnel connects Berne in Chelan County on its east with Scenic Hot Springs in King County on its west and is the longest railroad tunnel in the United States.

== History ==
=== Original tunnel ===
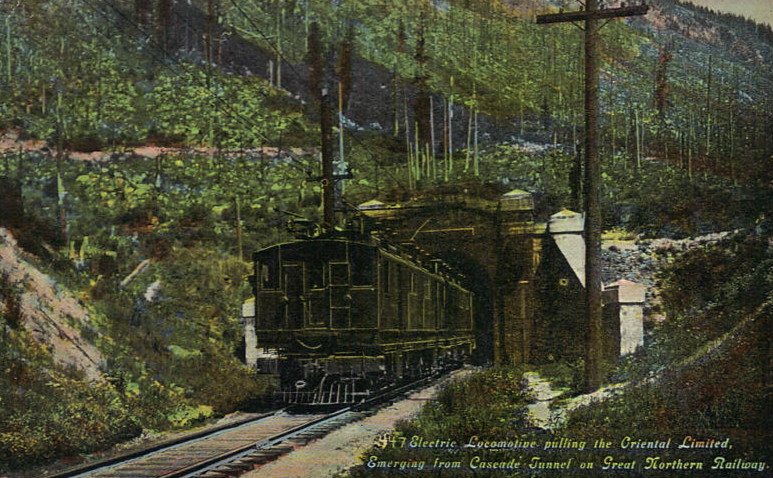
The Oriental Limited emerging from the old tunnel in 1918. The train was pulled by a Great Northern boxcab locomotive.

Construction began on the first tunnel on August 20, 1897, and was completed on December 20, 1900. The tunnel was 2.6 miles (4.2 km) long. John Frank Stevens was the principal engineer on the interim switchback route (opened in 1893, with grades up to 4 percent) and the first Cascade Tunnel. Stevens Pass, located above the tunnels, was named after him.

The tunnel had a fume problem from the coal-burning steam locomotives. It was built with a 1.7% (1:58.8) gradient eastbound, which was too close to the ruling gradient of 2.2%. Because of the steepness of the line, the locomotives had to pull hard to make the grade and thus burn more coal, which would lead to immense smoke in the bore. The tunnel was electrified, with the project completed on July 10, 1909, eliminating the problem. The unusual system used was three-phase AC, 6.6 kilovolts at 25 Hz, from a 5 MW (6,700 hp) hydroelectric plant on the Wenatchee River just west of Leavenworth. The tunnel section only was electrified; 4.0 route miles (6.4 km) or 6.0 track miles (9.7 km) and 1.7 percent grade through the tunnel chamber.

The motive power for the section consisted of four GN boxcab locomotives supplied by the American Locomotive Company; they used electrical equipment from General Electric and were of 1,500 horsepower (1,100 kW) and weighed 115 short tons (104 t) each. Initially three locomotives were coupled together and hauled trains at a constant speed of 15.7 mph (25.3 km/h), but when larger trains required four locomotives the motors were concatenated (cascade control), so that the speed was halved to 7.8 mph (12.6 km/h) to avoid overloading the power supply. The consulting engineer, Cary T. Hutchinson, published a detailed description of the system in 1909.

The tunnel was still plagued by snow slides in the area. On March 1, 1910, an avalanche at Wellington (renamed Tye after the disaster) near the west portal of the original 2.6 miles (4.2 km) Cascade Tunnel, killed 96–101 people, the deadliest avalanche disaster in U.S. history. This disaster prompted the construction of the current tunnel.

The old tunnel was abandoned in 1929, after the new longer and lower tunnel was opened. During the winter of 2007–2008, a section of the roof caved in and created a debris dam inside the tunnel, making it impassable to pedestrians due to standing water and ceiling debris. A warning was issued to stay clear of the western side of the old tunnel for a distance of 0.5 mi (0.80 km) for the indeterminate future.

=== Current tunnel ===
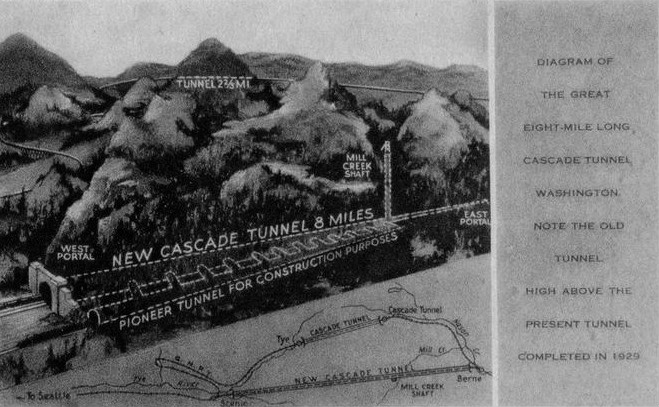
Postcard illustration of the old and new tunnels from the Great Northern Railway

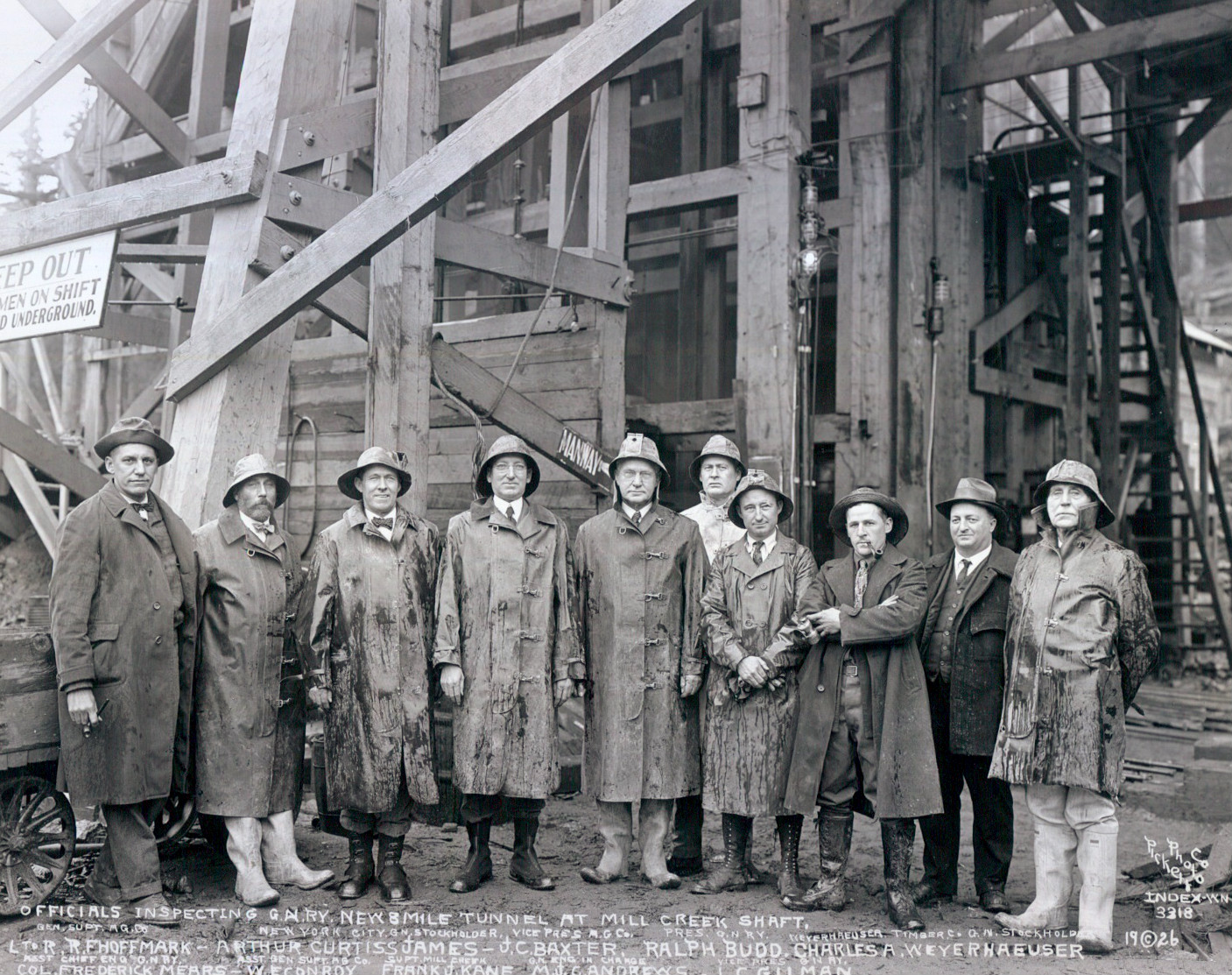
Railroad officials at the Mill Creek shaft, allowing excavation to proceed outwards from within the mountains

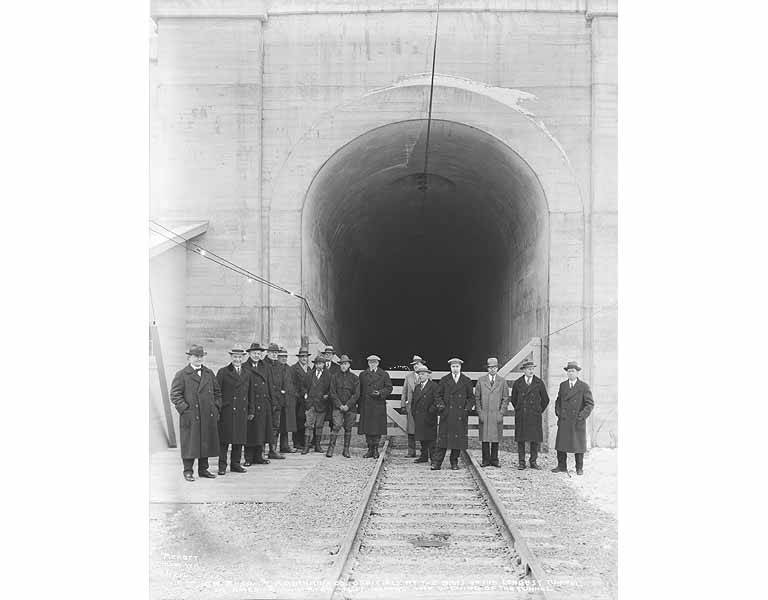
Opening of the new tunnel, January 12, 1929

The new Cascade Tunnel was opened on January 12, 1929. The new line had 72.9 route mi (117.3 km) or 93.2 route miles (150.0 km) electrified, between Skykomish and Wenatchee. The ruling grade was still 2.2 percent, although 21 miles (34 km) of 2 percent or worse grade was eliminated. The line length was reduced by 8.7 miles (14 km), and maximum elevation was lowered by 502 feet (153 m) from 3,382 feet (1,031 m) to 2,881 feet (878 m).

The new tunnel was started in December 1925, and was built in just over three years by A. Guthrie of Saint Paul, Minnesota; the aim was to finish by the winter of 1928–1929 so that further maintenance on deteriorating snow sheds could be avoided. Project manager and engineer Frederick Mears was assigned to make sure the project was completed.

While the new tunnel was being constructed, the Great Northern received delivery of five new electric locomotives. The new locomotives had a motor–generator supplying DC traction motors, and the single-phase AC supply required only one instead of two overhead conductors. Hence, the Great Northern re-electrified 21 miles (34 km) of the original route at single-phase (11 kV, 25 Hz) AC, including 8 miles (13 km) that were subsequently abandoned upon completion of the new tunnel, and used steam locomotives on the short remaining stretches of the old line.

On March 5, 1927, the three-phase electrification was abandoned, and the new locomotives were placed in service between Skykomish and the east portal of the old tunnel; the time was reduced from 4 hours for a 2,500-short-ton (2,300 t) eastbound train to 1 hour 45 minutes for a 3,500-short-ton (3,200 t) train. Furthermore, for the first time regenerated power could be used by another train or fed back to the utility company (power from regenerative braking was previously dissipated in a water rheostat at the power station).

Two years later, the new tunnel opened. It was the longest railroad tunnel in the Americas until 1989, when the Mount Macdonald Tunnel in British Columbia was completed, moving the Cascade into second place.

Electrification was removed in 1956, after a ventilation system was installed to eliminate diesel fumes.

On April 4, 1996 an eastbound freight train broke through the doors at the east portal after they did not open properly. There were no injuries, but the broken doors slowed operations for a couple of days while replacement doors were brought up from the Seattle area.

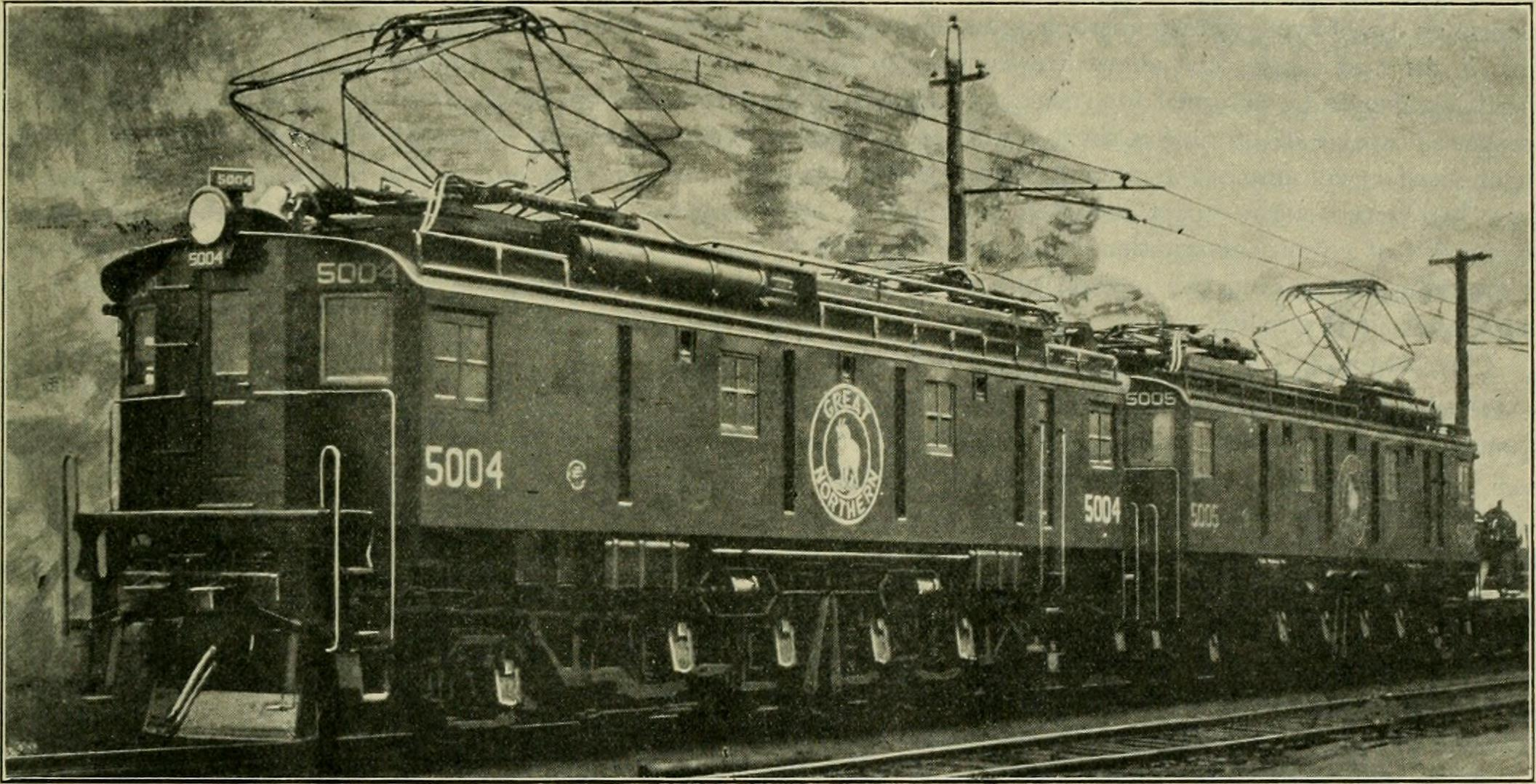
The Great Northern Z-1, one of the locomotives used on the new Cascade Tunnel

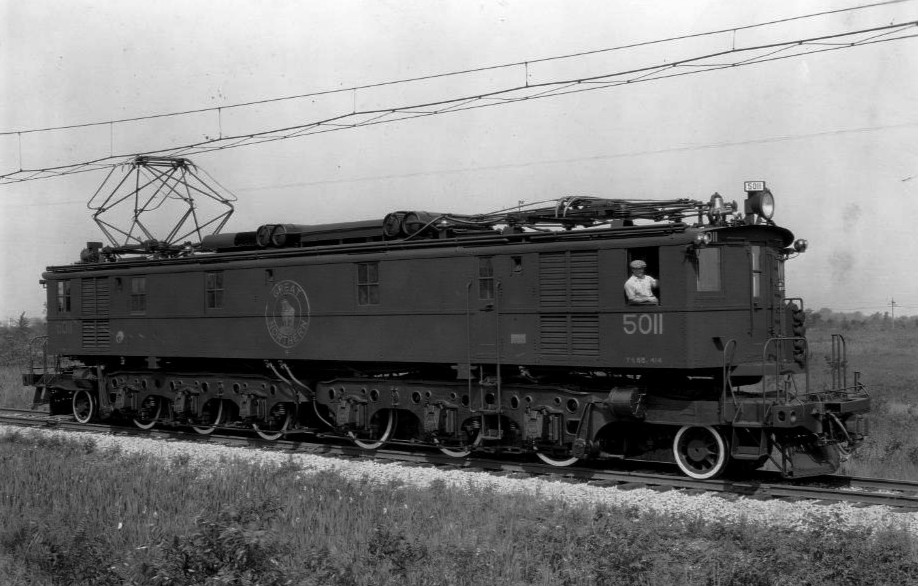
The Great Northern Y-1, the other locomotive used on the current tunnel

== Operations ==
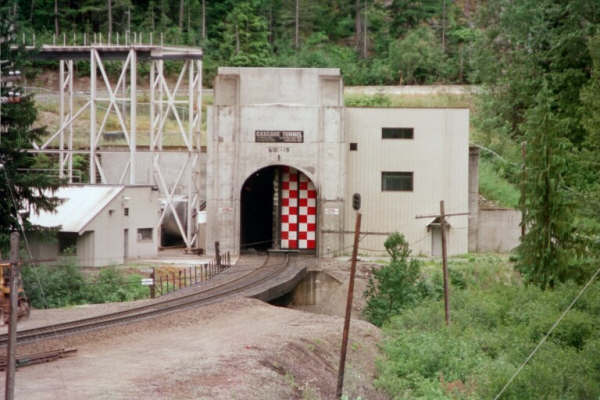
East Portal doors opening

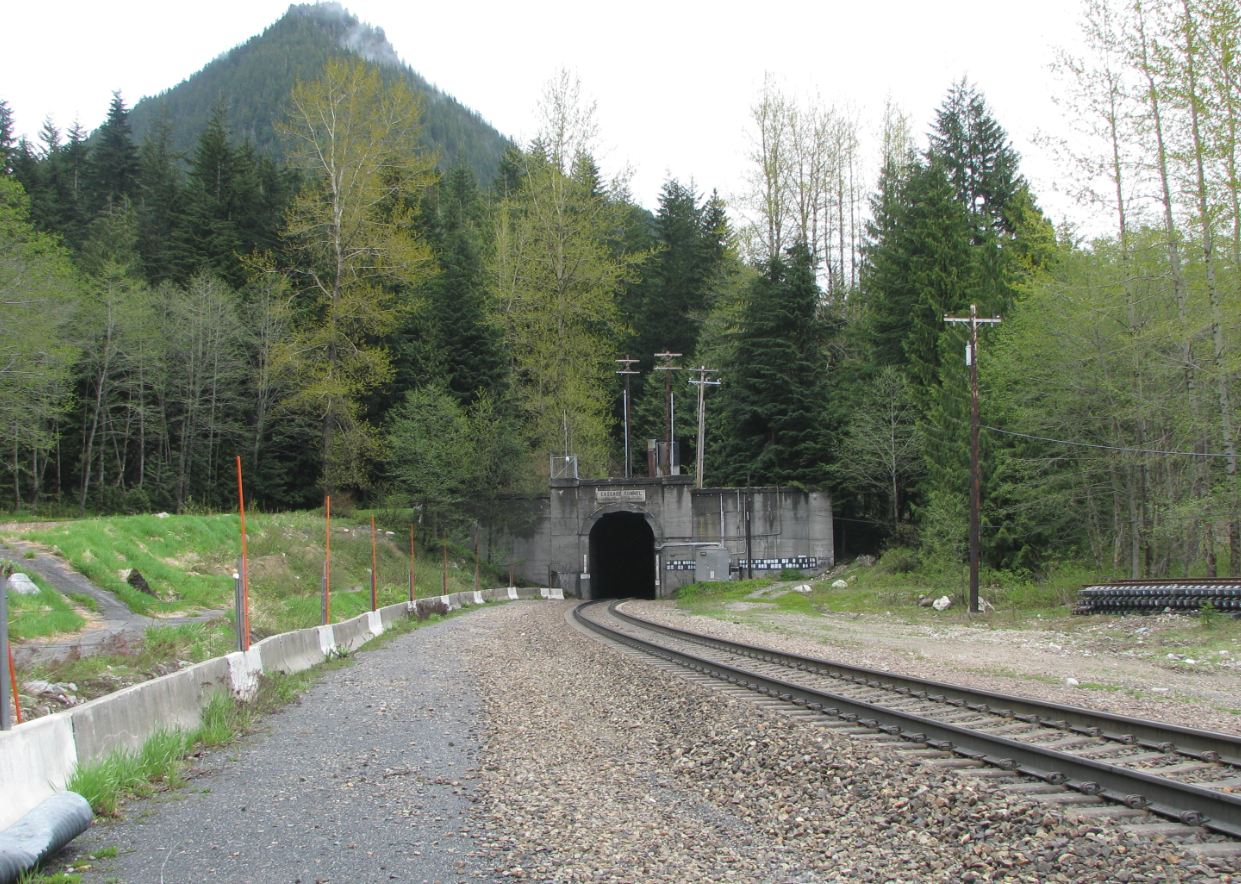
West Portal in 2011

The current Cascade Tunnel is in full operation and receives regular maintenance from BNSF Railway. The new alignment is a straight-line tunnel running between Berne and Scenic Hot Springs. It is currently part of the BNSF Scenic Subdivision between Seattle and Wenatchee, and Amtrak's Empire Builder runs through it. Because of safety and ventilation issues, this tunnel is a limiting factor on how many trains the railroad can operate over this route from Seattle to Spokane. The current limit is 28 trains per day. Speed through the tunnel is 30 miles per hour (48 km/h) for passenger trains, 25 miles per hour (40 km/h) for freight trains.

The gradient in this tunnel is 1.565% (1:64), with the rise from west to east. The gradient is 2.2% on the west side from the town of Skykomish. Most recently, telecommunications assets and track sections inside the tunnel were improved.

=== Ventilation operations ===
Because of the length of the tunnel, an unusual system is used to ensure that the air inside remains breathable and reduce problems with excess fumes. As a train enters the west portal of the tunnel, a red-and-white-checkered door closes on the east portal and high-power fans blow in cool air through a second portal to help the diesel engines. As long as the train is within the tunnel, the fans work with reduced power to avoid pressure problems. When the train is 0.5 miles (1 km) to the tunnel exit, the door begins to open.

Once the train has cleared the tunnel, the door closes again and the fans operate for 20 to 30 minutes with maximum power to clear the tunnel of exhaust before the next train passes through. In the opposite direction, the door opens when the train is within 0.6 miles (1 km). The fans are powered by two 800 horsepower (600 kW) electric motors, clearing the air through the seven miles (11 km) of tunnel within 20 minutes. Present-day train crews carry portable respirators for use in the event of a fan failure or a train stalling inside the tunnel. In addition, there are emergency/safety stations spaced 1,500–2,500 feet (460–760 m) apart, depending on the location within the tunnel, that provide additional air tanks and equipment to be used in the event of a ventilation/other failure.

The tunnel door is protected by an absolute signal near the east portal; on the west side, another signal with dual-flashing lunar aspects indicates to eastbound trains that the tunnel fans are operating.

== See also ==
- Flathead Tunnel, an active tunnel in Montana also built by the Great Northern
- Great Northern W-1, large electric locomotives used on the Cascade Tunnel route
- Lists of tunnels
- Moffat Tunnel, a similar railroad tunnel in Colorado
- Mount Macdonald Tunnel, a similar railroad tunnel in British Columbia
- Otira Tunnel, a tunnel in New Zealand with similar characteristics
- Snoqualmie Tunnel, Milwaukee Road near Snoqualmie Pass (inactive, now a rail trail)
- Stampede Tunnel, Northern Pacific at Stampede Pass
