= Great Northern Tunnel =

Rail tunnel in Seattle, Washington, United States

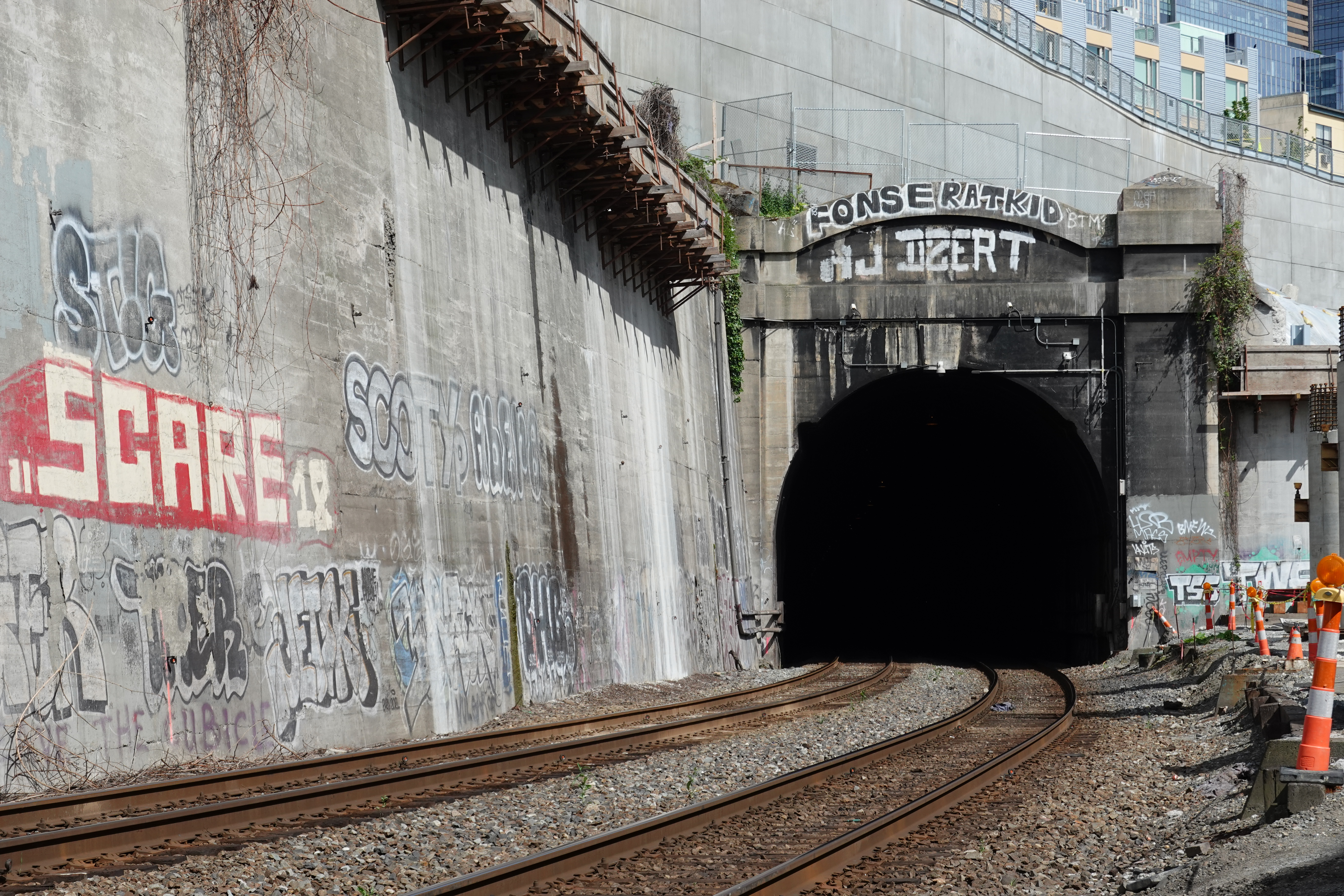
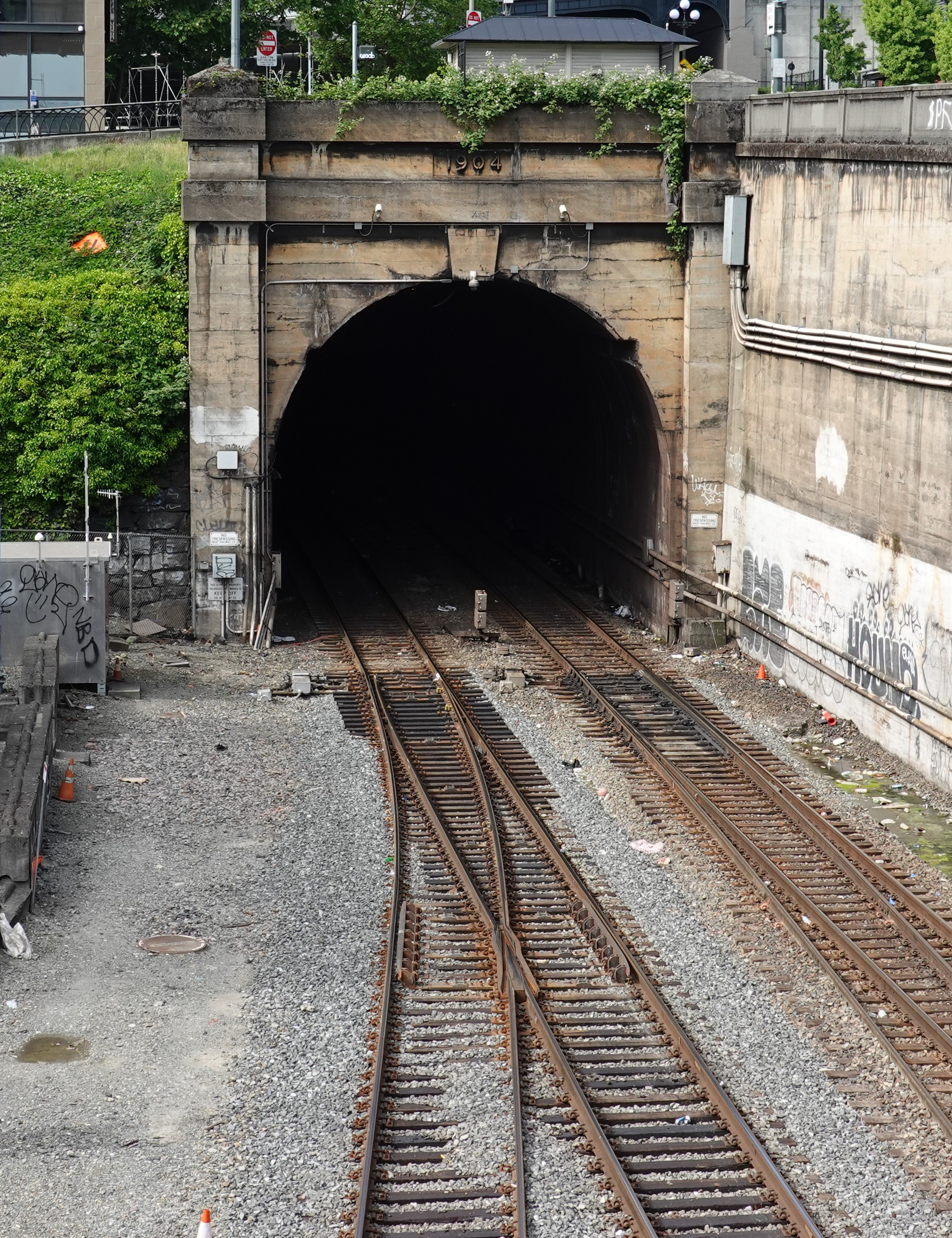
- North and South Portals of the tunnel
- Interactive map of Great Northern Tunnel

Overview
- Line: Scenic Subdivision
- Location: Seattle, Washington
- Coordinates: 47.604°N 122.333°W
- Status: Active
- System: Amtrak Empire Builder; Amtrak Cascades; Sounder commuter rail Northern Transcon

Operation
- Opened: 1905
- Owner: BNSF; Burlington Northern Railroad (1970-1995); Great Northern Railway (original)
- Operator: BNSF
- Character: passenger, freight

Technical
- Line length: 5,141 feet (1,567 m)
- No. of tracks: 2
- Track gauge: 4 ft 8 1/2 in (1,435 mm) (standard gauge)
- Tunnel clearance: 28 feet (8.5 m)

The Great Northern Tunnel is a 1-mile (1.6 km) double-tracked railway tunnel under downtown Seattle, Washington, completed by the Great Northern Railway in 1905, and now owned by the BNSF Railway, on its Scenic Subdivision. At the time it was built, it was the tallest and widest tunnel in the United States, at 28 feet (8.5 m) high and 30 feet (9.1 m) wide.

The southern portal is just north of King Street Station, and the northern in Victor Steinbrueck Park, between Virginia and Pine Streets. The Downtown Seattle Transit Tunnel passes four feet below the Great Northern Tunnel.

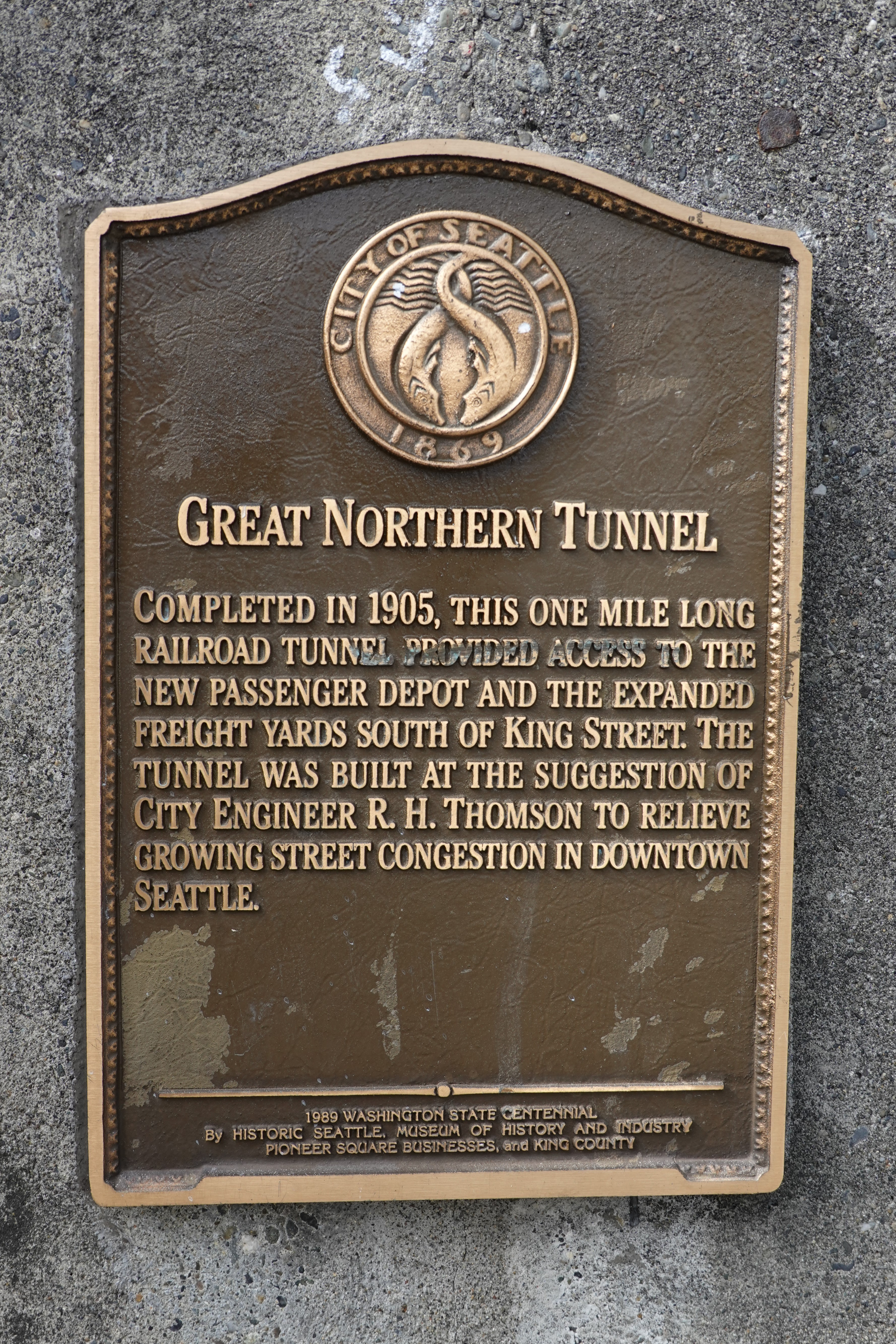
A plaque commemorating the completion of the Great Northern Tunnel in 1905.

Freight and passenger trains use the tunnel, including Amtrak service to Chicago (the Empire Builder) and Vancouver, B.C. (Cascades), and Sound Transit's Seattle–Everett Sounder commuter rail service.

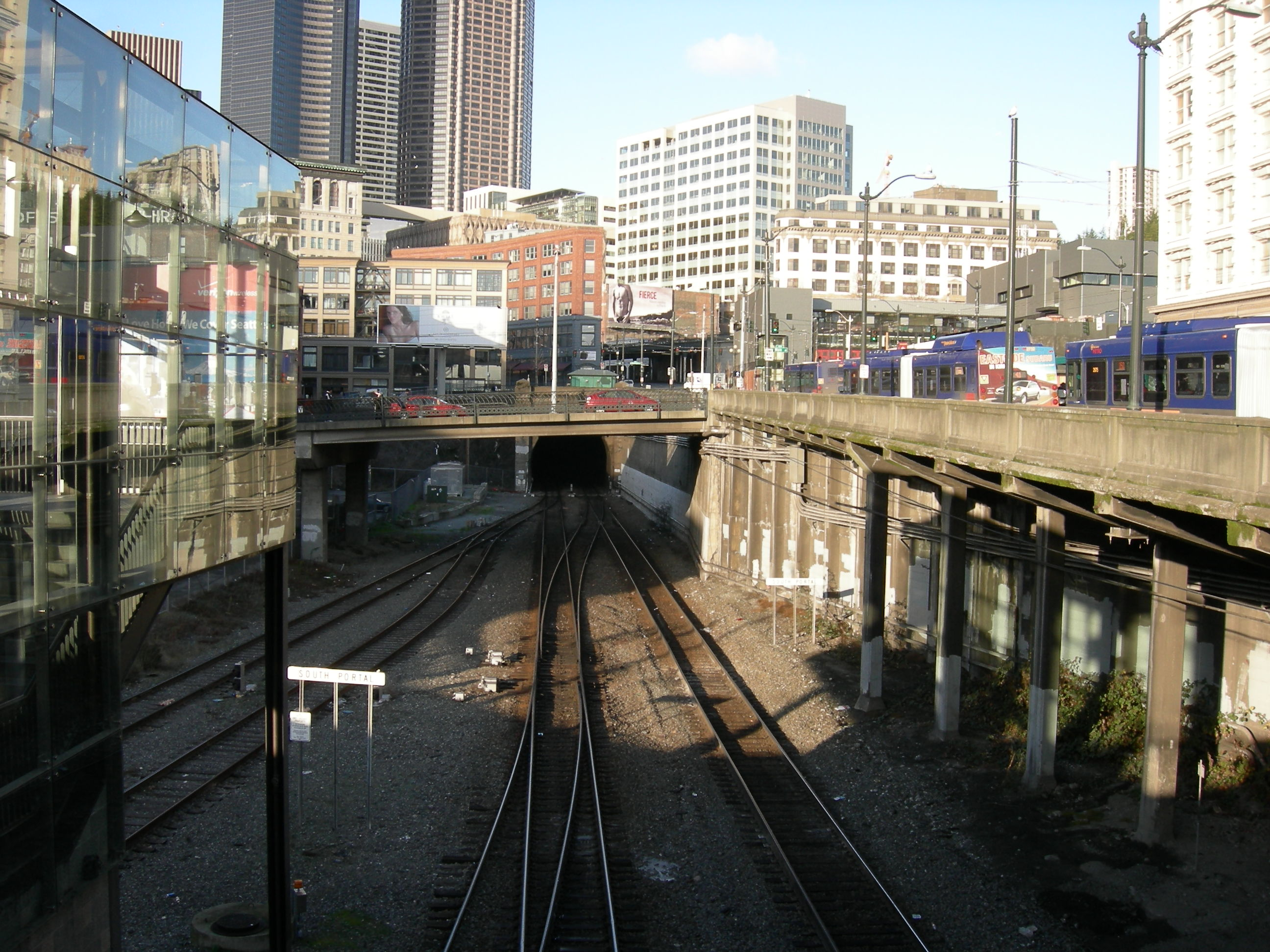
A more distant view of the South Portal of the tunnel
