= Great Northern boxcab (3 phase) =

Great Northern Boxcab (3-Phase)
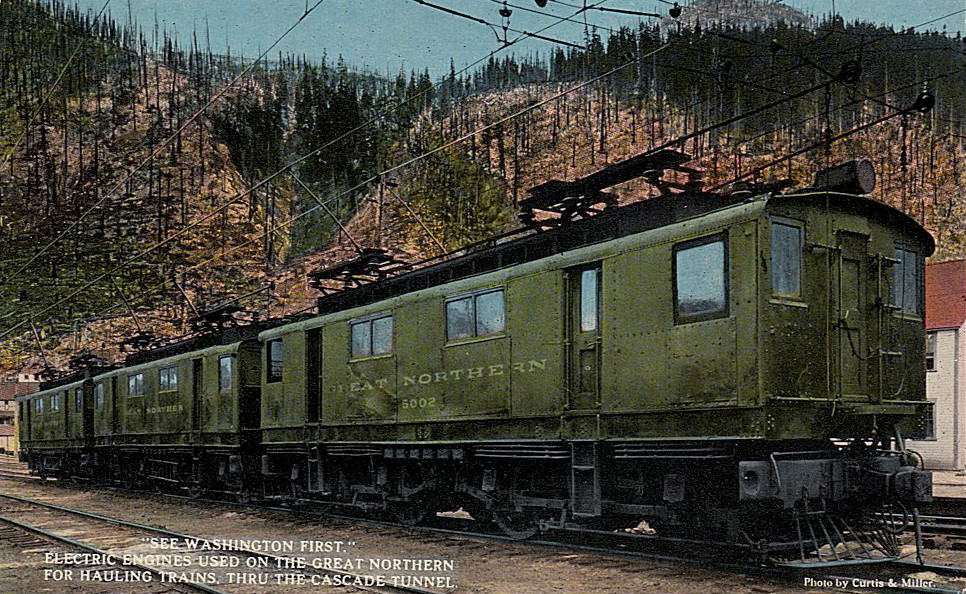
- Three Great Northern boxcabs
Type and origin
- Power type: Electric
- Builder: GE and ALCO
- Serial number: Alco: 45289, 45286–45288; GE: 2895, 2892–2894
- Build date: February–March 1909
Specifications
- Configuration
  - AAR: B-B
  - UIC: Bo′Bo′
- Gauge: 4 ft 8 1/2 in (1,435 mm) standard gauge
- Wheel diameter: 60 in (1.5 m)
- Length: 44 ft 2 in (13.46 m)
- Width: 10 ft 0 in (3.05 m)
- Loco weight: 230,000 lb (100,000 kg; 100 t)
- Electric system/s: 6.6 kV, 25 Hz AC (3-Phase)
- Current pickup: Pantograph
- Traction motors: 4 × GE-1506
- Gear ratio: 19/81
Performance figures
- Maximum speed: 15 mph (24 km/h)
- Power output: 1,500 hp (1,100 kW)
- Tractive effort
  - Starting: 57,500 lbf (256 kN) at 25% adhesion
  - 1 hour: 38,000 lbf (170 kN)
  - Continuous: 34,800 lbf (155 kN)
- Factor of adh.: 25%
Career
- Operators: Great Northern Railway
- Number in class: 4
- Numbers: 5000–5003
- Delivered: 1909
- Retired: May 1927
- Disposition: All scrapped

The GN boxcab locomotives were the first electric locomotives purchased by the Great Northern Railway (GN) for use through the Cascade Tunnel. Four locomotives supplied were built in February and March 1909 by the American Locomotive Company, and delivered in Pullman Green; they used electrical equipment from General Electric and weighed 115 short tons (104 t) each.

They were three-phase electric locomotives with specifications calling for 1,000 hp (750 kW), but the actual output was substantially greater at 1,500 hp (1,100 kW) each, as described by the consultant engineer Cary T. Hutchinson. They had a B-B wheel arrangement. The GN numbered them 5000–5003 and they were used until May 1927, after which all were scrapped.

Initially, three locomotives were coupled together and hauled trains at a constant speed of 15.7 mph (25.3 km/h), but when larger trains required four locomotives, the motors were concatenated (cascade control), so that the speed was halved to 7.8 mph (12.6 km/h) to avoid overloading the power supply.
