= Great Northern W-1 =

Electric locomotive

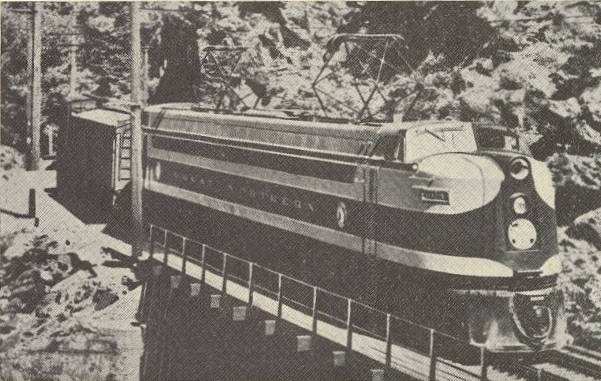
Type and origin
- Power type: Electric
- Builder: GE Erie Works
- Serial number: 28448, 28449
- Build date: June 1947
- Total produced: 2
Specifications
- Configuration
  - Whyte: 0-4-8-8-4-0OE
  - AAR: B-D+D-B
  - UIC: (Bo′Do′)(Do′Bo′)
- Gauge: 4 ft 8 1/2 in (1,435 mm)
- Wheel diameter: 42 in (1.1 m)
- Minimum curve: 17 degrees (locomotive only); 10 degrees (with train)
- Length: 101 ft (31 m)
- Height: 15 ft 6 in (4.72 m)
- Adhesive weight: 720,000 lb (330 t)
- Loco weight: 720,000 lb (330 t)
- Electric system/s: 11 kV, 25 Hz AC
- Current pickup(s): Pantograph
- Traction motors: 12 GE 746 of 420 hp (310 kW)
- Transmission: AC Synchronous motors (2×), DC Generators (4×), DC traction motors (12×)
- Train heating: None
- Loco brake: Air/Regenerative
- Train brakes: Air
Performance figures
- Maximum speed: 65 mph (105 km/h)
- Power output: 5,000 hp (3,700 kW)
- Tractive effort: 119,000 lbf (530 kN)
Career
- Operators: Great Northern Railway
- Class: W-1
- Number in class: 2
- Numbers: 5018, 5019
- Delivered: 1947
- Retired: August 1956
- Scrapped: 1968, 1959
- Disposition: 5018 sold to Union Pacific in 1960, rebuilt in 1962, and scrapped in 1968. 5019 scrapped in 1959.

The W-1 was a class of electric locomotive used by the Great Northern Railway. They were constructed to haul trains on the 73-mile (117 km) electrified portion of the railroad across the Cascade Mountains from Wenatchee, Washington to Skykomish, Washington, including the Cascade Tunnel. Only two locomotives were built, and they had an AAR B-D+D-B wheel arrangements.

The locomotives were built at General Electric's Erie works in 1947, and were numbered 5018 and 5019. They were powered by two W-1 motor-generators, with a total 5,000 horsepower (3.7 MW), and at that time were the largest single-unit electric locomotives used in North America. The engines share a great resemblance to the Virginian EL-2B locomotives.

Both locomotives were retired in August 1956 when the electrification system was switched off and diesel locomotives started operating. Unit 5019 was scrapped in 1959. Unit 5018 was sold to the Union Pacific, who used its body and running gear as part of the unsuccessful experimental coal burning turbine-electric locomotive #80. It was eventually scrapped in 1968.
