= Y1 adrenocortical cell =

Y1 adrenocortical cell is a murine tumor cell line used for biomedical research as a model systems for adrenal cortex studies. Y1 adrenocortical cell was generated from an adrenocortical tumor of a male LAF1 mouse.
