= Great Northern Y-1 =

Class of American electric locomotives

Great Northern Railway Y-1 Pennsylvania Railroad FF2
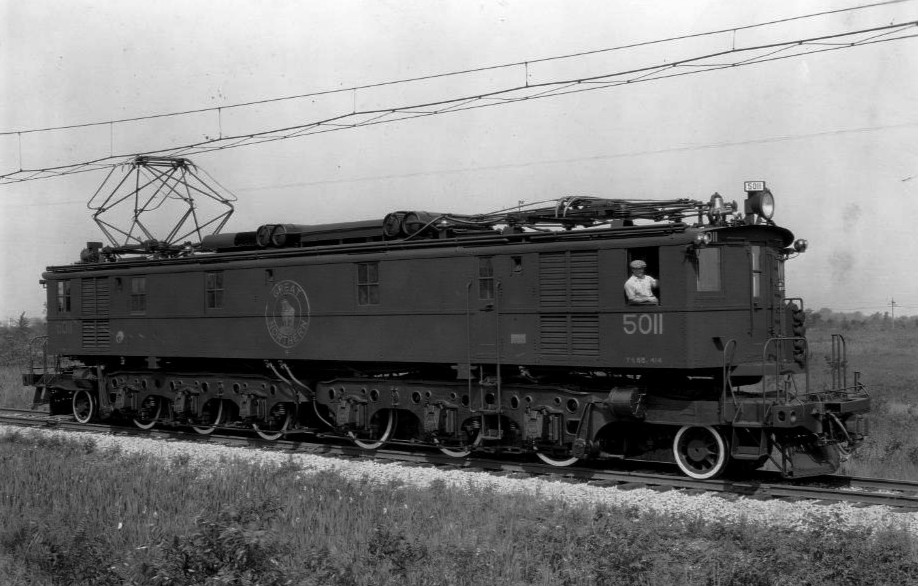
- GN Y-1 #5011 in 1927 (before wreck and rebuild).
Type and origin
- Power type: Electric
- Builder: Alco–General Electric
- Model: GE: 1-C+C-1-410/518-E6GE290A-11000V
- Build date: 1927 (2), 1928 (2), 1930 (4)
- Total produced: 8
Specifications
- Configuration
  - Whyte: 2-6-0+0-6-2OE
  - AAR: 1-C+C-1
  - UIC: (1′Co)+(Co1′)
  - Commonwealth: 1Co+Co1
- Gauge: 4 ft 8 1/2 in (1,435 mm) standard gauge
- Adhesive weight: c. 410,000 lb (186,000 kg; 186.0 t)
- Loco weight: 5010–5011: 518,250 lb (235,100 kg; 235.1 t); 5012–5017: 527,200 lb (239,100 kg; 239.1 t)
- Electric system/s: 11 kV AC, 25 Hz overhead
- Current pickup: Pantograph
- Transmission: Motor–generator supplied direct current fed to 6 traction motors.
Performance figures
- Power output: 3,000 hp (2.24 MW) (continuous); 3,300 hp (2.46 MW) (one hour)
Career
- Operators: Great Northern Railway; Pennsylvania Railroad
- Class: GN: Y-1; PRR FF2
- Numbers: GN: 5010–5017; PRR: 1–7
- Nicknames: Stingers
- Locale: North America
- Last run: GN: 1956; PRR: 1966
- Scrapped: 1957 (1), 1960 (1), 1962 (1), 1966 (5)
- Disposition: All scrapped

The Great Northern Railway's class Y-1 comprised eight electric locomotives with AAR 1-C+C-1 wheel arrangements. The locomotives were used on the 73-mile (117 km) electrified portion of the railroad, from Wenatchee, Washington to Skykomish, Washington, including the Cascade Tunnel.

The 3,000 horsepower (2.2 MW) locomotives were built at Schenectady, New York, with car bodies manufactured by American Locomotive Company and electrical components supplied by General Electric. They used motor-generator sets to rectify the alternating current line voltage into direct current for their traction motors. The GN numbered the units 5010–5017 and classified them Y-1 being painted in the "Pullman Green" (Dark green with the GNs logo plastered on the sides of the locomotive) paint scheme. After being involved in a wreck at Tonga, Washington in July 1945, the 5011 was rebuilt with a streamlined appearance using cabs from an EMD FT; the GN reclassified it as Y-1a.

All Y-1 units were later repainted into the GN Empire Builder scheme (Orange with a black stripe in the middle with yellow pinstriping running along the sides and a black section at the top with yellow pinstriping) and were equipped with busbars located where the headlights and bells used to be to connect the 11kV AC current between units when doing multiple-unit operation. Crews affectionately gave these apparatuses the nickname "stingers" due to the shape and placement of them. This relocated the headlight to the far front ends of the locomotive and the bell on each end was relocated under the cab on the engineers side. In 1956, the GN dieselized operations through the Cascade Tunnel. The electrical system was decommissioned, and the Y-1 locomotives were sold to the Pennsylvania Railroad, who classified them as FF2. GN 5011 was broken up for spares, and the remaining seven locomotives were overhauled and converted to PRR standards and then placed into service, being assigned numbers 1–7 on the PRR. They lasted a few more years on the PRR, and were all scrapped between 1957 and 1966.

== Fleet roster ==
ALCO serial	GE serial	Build date	GN No.	PRR No.	Scrap date
67022	10160	August 1927	5010	1	1966
67023	10161	September 1927	5011	—	1957
67542	10537	September 1928	5012	2	1962
67543	10538	July 1928	5013	3	1966
68272	11149	August 1930	5014	4	1960
68273	11150	August 1930	5015	5	1966
68274	11151	August 1930	5016	6	1966
68275	11152	August 1930	5017	7	1966

== Bibliography ==
- Keyes, Norman C. Jr.; Middleton, Kenneth R. (Autumn 1980). "The Great Northern Railway Company: All-Time Locomotive Roster, 1861–1970". Railroad History. 143 (143). Boston, Mass.: Railway and Locomotive Historical Society: 117. ISSN 0090-7847. JSTOR 43523930.
- Pennsylvania Railroad. "FF2". PRR Locomotive Diagrams. (Simple drawing and specifications, for general reference by railroad staff).
- Staufer, Alvin F.; Pennypacker, Bert (1962). Pennsy Power: Steam and Electric Locomotives of the Pennsylvania Railroad, 1900-1957. Research by Martin Flattley. Carollton, Ohio: Alvin F. Staufer. OCLC 8029613. pages 248–253
