= Scenic Hot Springs =

Resort in Scenic, Washington, United States

Coordinates: 47.709°N 121.138°W

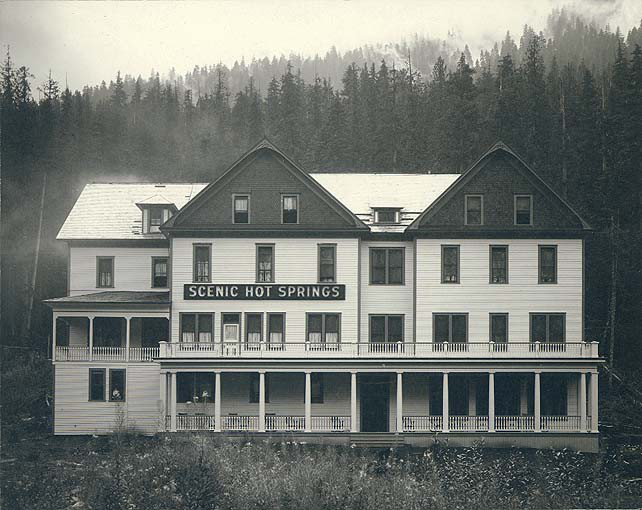
Scenic Hot Springs Hotel circa 1900

Scenic Hot Springs is a privately owned natural mineral spring in Washington state that is closed to the public. It is located south of U.S. Route 2, about 8 miles west of Stevens Pass and bordering the Alpine Lakes Wilderness. Nearby, the Great Northern Railway had a stop for travelers to experience the springs.

Near the railroad, in the 1890s, a lodge known as Madison Hot Springs, was built to accommodate visitors to these mineral baths who arrived by train from Seattle. The mineral spring water is slightly acidic with a natural temperature of about 50 °F (10.0 °C). The lodge heated the water and piped it to bathhouses, misleadingly advertising them as "hot springs".

The name of the lodge was later changed to Scenic Hot Springs and it survived as a commercial venture until 1928. Construction by the Great Northern Railway of an 8-mile tunnel under Stevens Pass dumped rubble into the front yard of the lodge and effected its destruction. Largely forgotten until the 1980s, it then became a popular gathering spot for mineral water bathers who constructed several tubs of various temperatures.

In October 2001 the King County Sheriff shut down the springs and threatened to arrest bathers for trespassing, at the land owner's request. The landowner was apparently not aware of what was taking place on the property. Activities occurring at the springs were a liability risk and the fact that the area is environmentally protected and no building permits had been issued was used as a reason to demolish the decking.

Today, the springs are privately owned, and may be accessed through a reservation system.
