= MA-10 cell =

MA-10 cells are a model cell line derived from the mouse Leydig cell tumor used in biomedical research. The cell line is a luteinizing hormone-dependent steroidogenic cell line that was generated from a mice inbred strain C57BL/6J. MA-10 cells are the most widely used of Leydig cell lines, and contributed much to our knowledge in Leydig cell steroid formation and regulation.
