= Northern Transcon =

Railroad route in the United States

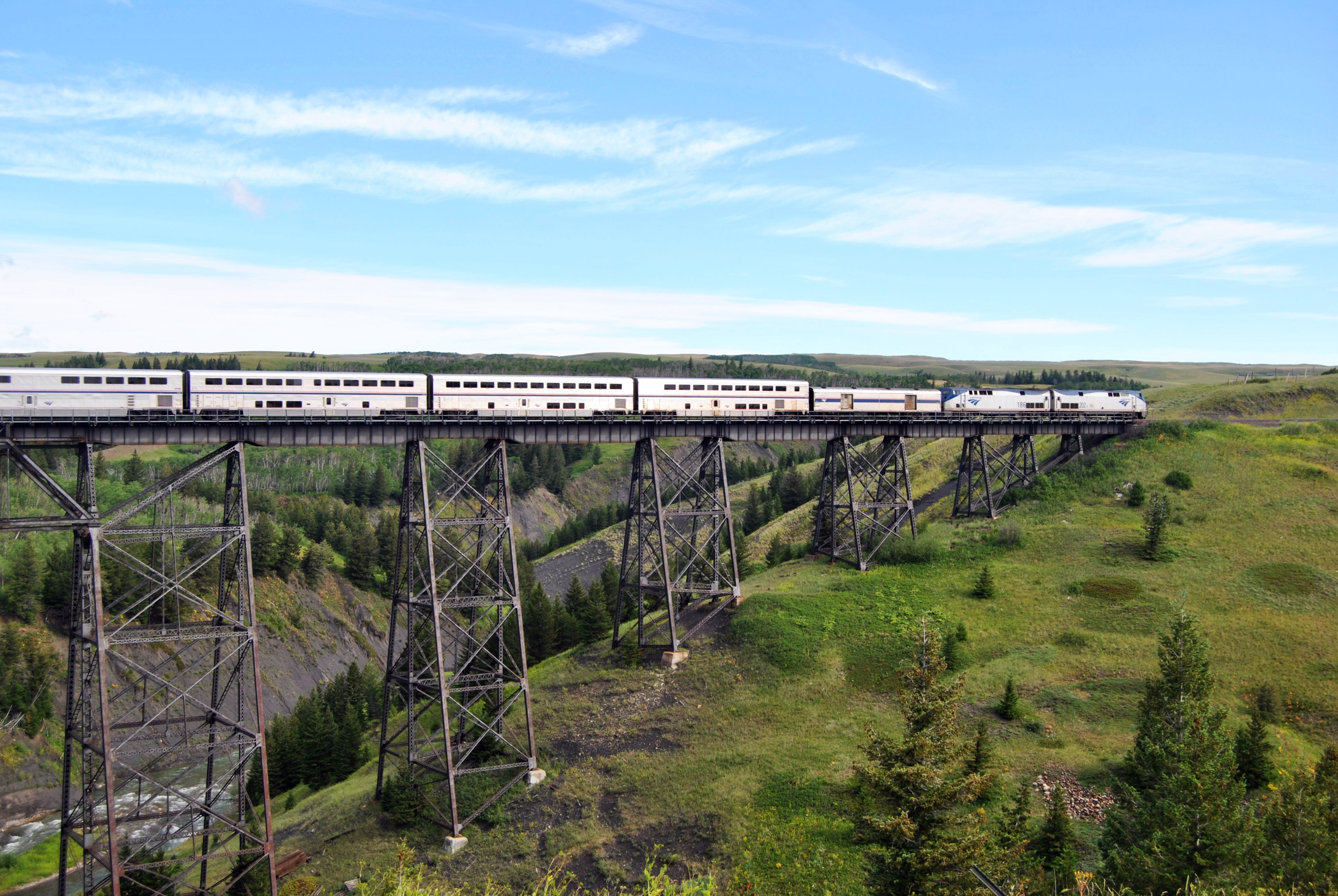
- The Empire Builder crosses the Two Medicine Trestle at East Glacier Park, Montana on the Hi Line Subdivision in 2011.

Overview
- Owner: BNSF Railway
- Locale: Northwestern and Midwestern United States
- Termini: Chicago; Vancouver / Portland
- Connecting lines: Chicago Subdivision; Aurora Subdivision; St. Croix Subdivision; Midway Subdivision; St. Paul Subdivision; Staples Subdivision; KO Subdivision; Glasgow Subdivision; Milk River Subdivision; Hi-Line Subdivision; Kootenai River Subdivision; Spokane Subdivision; Columbia River Subdivision; Scenic Subdivision; Lakeside Subdivision; Fallbridge Subdivision; Yakima Valley Subdivision; Stampede Subdivision; Seattle Subdivision

Service
- Type: Freight rail; Inter-city rail; Commuter rail
- Operators: BNSF Railway; Metra; Amtrak; Sound Transit

Technical
- Number of tracks: 1–4
- Track gauge: 1,435 mm (4 ft 8 1/2 in) standard gauge
- Train protection system: PTC

The Northern Transcon, a route operated by the BNSF Railway, traverses the most northerly route of any railroad in the western United States. This route was originally part of the Chicago, Burlington and Quincy Railroad, Northern Pacific Railway, Great Northern Railway and Spokane, Portland and Seattle Railway systems, merged into the Burlington Northern Railroad system in 1970.

== Route ==
The route starts at Chicago and runs west across northern Illinois to the Mississippi River. It follows the eastern shore of the river through La Crosse and Prairie du Chien, Wisconsin before turning west again in Minneapolis and St. Paul, Minnesota to Casselton, North Dakota. From Casselton the route runs northwest to Minot, North Dakota, then west through Montana and Idaho to Spokane, Washington.

In Montana, the line passes the East Gate of Glacier National Park and crosses the Two Medicine River on a high trestle. From East Glacier Park, Montana, the route continues ascending until it crests the Continental Divide at the summit of Marias Pass. The line descends down the west side of the pass for 20 miles (32 km) to Essex, Montana, running mostly double track on a narrow shelf, and crossing several high trestles over the Flathead River. Essex is home to the Izaak Walton Inn, which was constructed when the line was built to shelter railroad employees during the winter months. It also contains a small railyard used to store helper engines, which are used to supply additional power to freight trains crossing Marias Pass. Prior to the invention of the powerful diesel locomotives used today, longer trains often had to be split in order to make it up the pass.

From Essex, the line follows the Flathead River valley to Whitefish, Montana. Located in Whitefish is a restored passenger depot/museum (also serving Amtrak). The line continues northwest to Stryker, Montana, then turns south and passes through the 7-mile-long (11 km) Flathead Tunnel as it runs west toward Sandpoint, Idaho. The line leaves the Rocky Mountains after Athol, Idaho and reaches Spokane, Washington.

At Spokane the route splits into two, with one line going to Seattle, Washington and the other to Portland, Oregon.

The two longest railroad tunnels in the country are along the Northern Transcon: the Flathead Tunnel through the Rocky Mountains in Montana and the new Cascade Tunnel through the Cascade Mountains in Washington.

From St. Paul to the West Coast, this is basically the route of Amtrak's Empire Builder. But the Builder turns north in Fargo onto a BNSF secondary line to reach Grand Forks, North Dakota, while the Northern Transcon heads directly toward Minot. The Builder rejoins the Transcon main route at Minot and continues on to Seattle, though a section branches off to serve Portland, Oregon. BNSF also owns trackage with running rights in Winnipeg, Manitoba, Canada, where it has a yard operated by a switch unit and full crew. The track is maintained by a small track crew.

=== Historical alignments in Montana ===
The portion of the Northern Transcon line from Columbia Falls to Libby, Montana has been significantly rerouted twice since its initial construction in 1892.

==== Kootenai River valley ====
Prior to the opening of the Flathead Tunnel, trains left the modern route at Stryker, Montana and traveled northwest to Eureka, Montana, then traveled southwest along the Kootenai River and rejoined the present-day line at Jennings, located just below the Libby Dam.

In 1970, the construction of the Libby Dam formed Lake Koocanusa, flooding the towns of Rexford, Montana and Waldo, British Columbia and the railroad line. This required the relocation of more than 60 miles (97 km) of track between Stryker and Jennings and the building of Flathead Tunnel which, like the dam, was constructed by the US Army Corps of Engineers. Part of the original main line from Stryker to Eureka is still in use as the Mission Mountain Railroad. Before the construction of the tunnel, the Empire Builder also had a station stop in Eureka.

The only visible remnants of the original route are a stub track at Jennings, where the unused original track still remains close to the current main line, and Northwest of Eureka the original mainline is now a trail that meanders over towards Lake Koocanusa, with the old right of way eventually diving into the reservoir.

==== Haskell Pass ====
The alignment that travelled from Whitefish to Libby via Eureka was created in 1902 to replace a predecessor alignment over Haskell Pass, farther to the south.

The pass was named for its founder, Charles Haskell, who in the winter of 1891 had set out to locate a reasonable alignment for the Great Northern railroad to take between Kalispell, Montana and the Kootenai River. Ranging as far north as the Canada–US border, Haskell's party eventually returned to Kalispell in early spring, having crossed a low notch in the Salish Mountains on the return trip. A year after the scouting trip, construction was begun on what was to be the first of three Great Northern lines through the Salish.

Completed in 1892, the Haskell Pass line left the modern alignment of the route at Columbia Falls, Montana, a few miles east of Whitefish. The line travelled almost due south to Kalispell, where a branch split off the route that ran to Somers, Montana on the shore of Flathead Lake. The line travelled west from Kalispell to Marion, then alongside Little Bitteroot Lake, looping up on a high trestle over Herrig Creek, and passing through a 1,425-foot-long (434 m) tunnel at the summit of Haskell Pass, emerging high on the mountains above Pleasant Valley. The line descended to the valley floor, then turned north along Island Creek, and west down Wolf Creek, to the Fisher River. The line followed the Fisher River north to the Kootenai River Valley, where it returned to the 1902–1970 alignment at Jennings.

The Haskell Pass line was used only for ten years before the Kootenai River alignment opened. Shifting to the Kootenai River alignment was controversial because the new alignment was 20 miles (32 km) longer than the old route, although the new route had less steep grades.

Much of the Haskell Pass route was abandoned in 1902. The leg from Columbia Falls to Marion remained in use as a branch line until 1948, when it was truncated to Kalispell. When Flathead Tunnel was constructed in 1970, part of the Haskell Pass alignment along the Fisher River was recycled, namely the leg from Jennings to Tamarack siding (originally Sterling). On Haskell Pass, much of the right-of-way has been grown over, but small remnants of infrastructure and the original tunnel through the pass itself are still intact.

== Winter operations ==
Keeping the Northern Transcon open during the winter is a significant challenge, whether from snow in the Midwest and mountains, or rain in the Pacific Northwest. Heavy rains have the potential to cause mudslides along Puget Sound between Seattle and Everett and in the Nisqually, Washington area between Tacoma and Olympia. For example, in early January 2006, there were four slides between Seattle and Everett. In late January 2006 and again in early February 2006, mudslides occurred both between Seattle and Everett and around Nisqually. Heavy snow in the Rockies around Marias Pass have the potential to cause avalanches that can block the tracks. Following the clearing of a slide or an avalanche, no passenger train can run on the track for 48 hours to ensure that the slide area has stabilized, per BNSF policy.

== Passenger trains ==
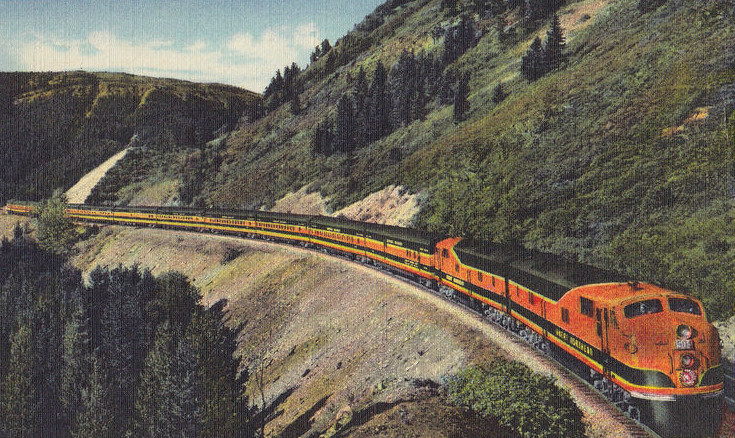
The Empire Builder traveling through Glacier National Park, Montana. (1947)

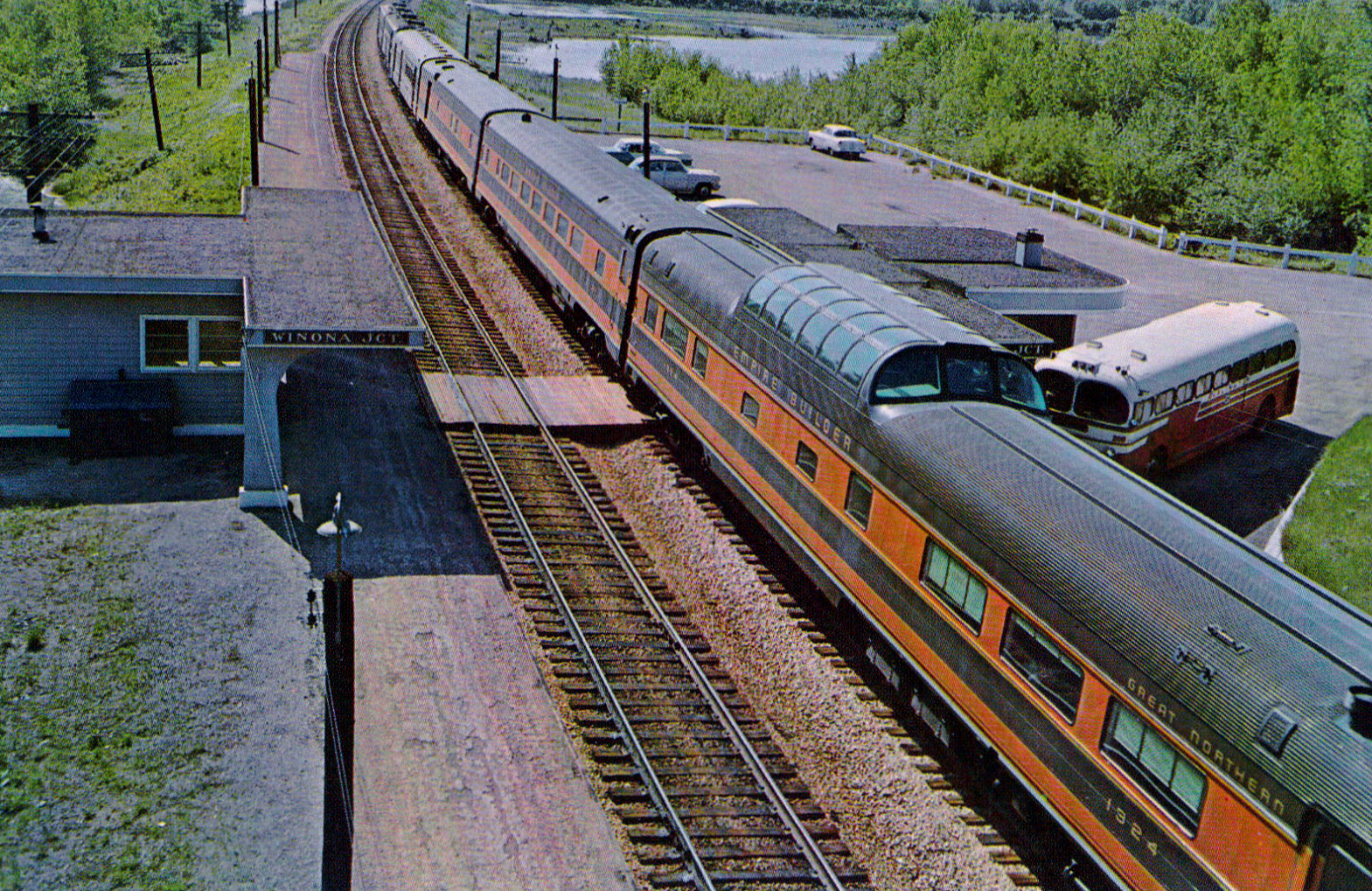
The Empire Builder train at Winona Junction, Wisconsin, in 1958

Amtrak operates its Empire Builder on the corridor between Twin Cities and points west, though the train utilizes a more northerly route between Fargo and Minot. Until the formation of Amtrak in May 1971, both Burlington Northern and its predecessor, the Great Northern, ran the Builder on the section between Chicago and Twin Cities via Savanna, part of today's BNSF Northern Transcon route. When Amtrak took over service, it rerouted the train to run between Chicago and Minneapolis-St. Paul through Milwaukee via the Milwaukee Road. Both Burlington Northern and Great Northern at the time also used to operate west from the Twin Cities before turning northwest in Willmar, Minnesota, to reach Fargo.

Between 1971 and 1979, on the parallel route of the former Northern Pacific between Twin Cities and Spokane via Staples, Fargo, Bismarck, Missoula and Helena run the North Coast Hiawatha, which also served stops such as St. Cloud, Staples and Detroit Lakes. Between Chicago and Minneapolis, and between Spokane and Seattle, the North Coast Hiawatha run combined with the Builder three days a week.

When Amtrak suspended the North Coast Hiawatha, it rerouted the Builder over the former NP mainline between Minneapolis-St. Paul and Fargo to continue to serve St. Cloud, Staples and Detroit Lakes, which otherwise would have lost service when the North Coast Hiawatha was suspended. The realignment of the Builder from the former GN mainline to the NP mainline however resulted in the loss of the stops at Willmar, Breckenridge and Morris.

Between 2009 and 2013, when BNSF suspended freight traffic between Fargo and Minot via Grand Forks because of overflows of Devils Lake, threatened to allow the rising waters to cover the line unless Amtrak could provide $100 million to raise the tracks. BNSF also offered Amtrak, during that time, to accommodate the Builder on the segment of the Transcon between Fargo and Minot, but that would have meant the loss of the Grand Forks, Devils Lake and Rugby station stops. To compensate for the loss of station stops at Grand Forks, Devils Lake, and Rugby that would have been caused by the shift, BNSF suggested that Amtrak add a station stop at New Rockford, North Dakota. However, Amtrak said that they would continue using the line by the lake. In 2010, analysts estimated that Amtrak would soon either have to rebuild the bridge that crosses the lake at Churchs Ferry, or reroute its passenger trains. In June 2011 agreement was reached that Amtrak and BNSF would each cover 1/3 of the cost with the rest to come from the federal and state governments.

In December 2011, North Dakota was awarded a $10 million TIGER grant from the US Department of Transportation to assist with the state portion of the cost. Work began in June 2012, and the track is being raised in two stages: 5 feet (1.5 m) in 2012, and another 5 feet in 2013. Two bridges and their abutments are also being raised. When the track raise is complete, the top-of-rail elevation will be 1,466 ft (446.84 m). This is 10 feet above the level at which the lake will naturally overflow and will thus be a permanent solution to the Devils Lake flooding.

The Metra BNSF Line operates in the whole Chicago Subdivision, providing commuter rail service. These are the only passenger trains directly operated by BNSF via a "purchase of service agreement" with Metra. This stretch of track also hosts the Amtrak California Zephyr, the Amtrak Southwest Chief, and the Chicago-Quincy sections of the Amtrak Illinois Service on their way to Galesburg and points west.

Between October 2009 and January 2026, the Northstar Line operated north of Minneapolis on the Midway and Staples Subdivisions. Also, the Seattle Subdivision hosts Amtrak Cascades as well as Sounder commuter rail trains.

== Subdivisions ==
The Northern Transcon is divided into many subdivisions. From east to west, these include:

- Chicago Subdivision (Chicago, IL to Aurora, IL)
- Aurora Subdivision (Aurora, IL to La Crosse, WI)
- St. Croix Subdivision (La Crosse, WI to St. Croix Jct.)
- Joint Canadian Pacific-BNSF lines (St. Croix Jct. to St. Paul, MN)
- Midway/St. Paul Subdivisions (St. Paul, MN to Minneapolis, MN)
- Staples Subdivision (Minneapolis, MN to Dilworth, MN)
- KO Subdivision (Dilworth, MN to Minot, ND)
- Glasgow Subdivision (Minot, ND to Glasgow, MT)
- Milk River Subdivision (Glasgow, MT to Havre, MT)
- Hi-Line Subdivision (Havre, MT to Whitefish, MT)
- Kootenai River Subdivision (Whitefish, MT to Sandpoint, ID)
- Spokane Subdivision (Sandpoint, ID to Spokane, WA)

To the west of Spokane, WA (at Latah Jct, as of June 1973 to the present day), the line splits into two main routes, one using mostly the old Great Northern Railway route directly to Seattle, WA, and the other using mainly the former Spokane, Portland and Seattle Railway route, but also a large section of the former Northern Pacific Railway route, to Portland, OR via Pasco and Vancouver, WA; then it travels north to Seattle.

Expedited Transcon traffic is generally routed via the direct Seattle route, and slow bulk-freight traffic is generally routed via the Spokane–Portland–Seattle route (through Vancouver, WA). The Spokane–Portland–Seattle route is mostly water level with a 1.15% maximum grade near Marshall, Washington. (Note that there is a parallel BNSF-owned route that bypasses the 1.15% grade with a maximum grade of 0.8%; they operate it directionally.) There is a 0.95% maximum grade in the Napavine, Washington area. The direct Seattle route traverses the Cascade Range at the Cascade Tunnel (Scenic and Berne, Washington); it has 2.2% ruling grades in the vicinity of the tunnel.

Direct Seattle route:

- Columbia River Subdivision (Spokane, WA to Wenatchee, WA)
- Scenic Subdivision (Wenatchee, WA to Seattle, WA)

Portland-Seattle route:

- Lakeside Subdivision (Spokane, WA to Pasco, WA)
- Fallbridge Subdivision (Pasco, WA to Portland, OR)
- Seattle Subdivision (Seattle, WA to Vancouver, WA)

The former Northern Pacific Railway route via Stampede Pass through Pasco and Auburn, WA to Tacoma, WA has had a checkered history. Since 1996 it has been a third route to the coast. As of 2010 it was seldom used but still in service.

Stampede Pass line:

- Yakima Valley Subdivision (Pasco, WA to Ellensburg, WA)
- Stampede Subdivision (Ellensburg, WA to Auburn, WA)

== See also ==
- Southern Transcon
- Central Corridor (Union Pacific Railroad)
