= West Glacier station =

West Glacier, MT
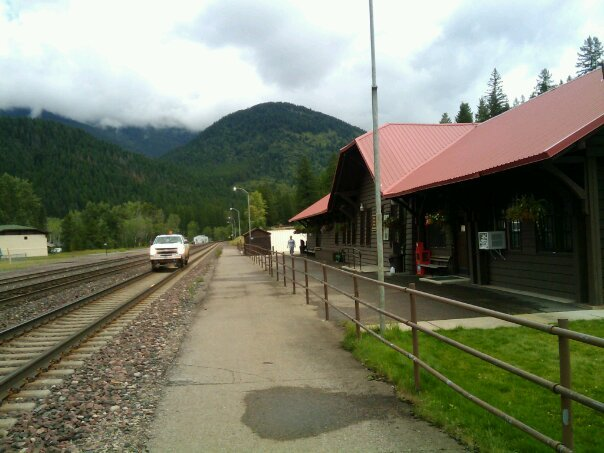
- Trackside view of West Glacier Amtrak station

General information
- Location: U.S. Hwy 2 & Going-to-the-Sun Road; West Glacier, Montana; United States
- Coordinates: 48°29′55″N 113°58′18″W
- Owner: Glacier Natural History Association
- Line: BNSF Hi Line Subdivision
- Platforms: 1 side platform
- Tracks: 2

Construction
- Accessible: Yes

Other information
- Station code: Amtrak: WGL

History
- Opened: June 18, 1893
- Rebuilt: 1910, 1935
- Former names: Belton

Passengers
- FY 2025: 4,799 (Amtrak)

Services
Preceding station	Amtrak	Following station
Whitefish toward Seattle or Portland	Empire Builder	Essex toward Chicago
Former services
Preceding station	Great Northern Railway	Following station
Grizzly toward Seattle	Main Line	Red Eagle toward St. Paul
Location

West Glacier station is a station stop for the Amtrak Empire Builder in West Glacier, Montana. The station building, constructed in 1910 and enlarged in 1935, was donated to the Glacier Natural History Association in 1991 and now houses the offices and bookstore of the Glacier National Park Conservancy. Amtrak ticketing and other passenger services are not available. The adjacent track and platform continue to be owned by BNSF Railway. The station is historically known as Belton, and that former name continues to be displayed on the station building.
