= Snowslip, Montana =

Unincorporated community in Montana, United States

- Census-designated place
- Location within Montana Location within the United States
- Coordinates: 48°15′59″N 113°26′37″W
- Country: United States
- State: Montana
- County: Flathead

Area
  - Total: 0.79 sq mi (2.04 km^{2})
  - Land: 0.79 sq mi (2.04 km^{2})
  - Water: 0 sq mi (0.00 km^{2})
- Elevation: 4,403 ft (1,342 m)

Population (2020)
  - Total: 39
  - Density: 49.5/sq mi (19.13/km^{2})
- Time zone: UTC-7 (Mountain (MST))
  - Summer (DST): UTC-6 (MDT)
- ZIP Code: 59916 (Essex)
- Area code: 406
- FIPS code: 30-69345
- GNIS feature ID: 2806618

Snowslip is an unincorporated community and census-designated place (CDP) in Flathead County, Montana, United States. As of the 2020 census, Snowslip had a population of 39. It is in the eastern part of the county, along U.S. Route 2, 7 miles (11 km) southwest of where the highway crosses the Continental Divide at Marias Pass. The community is in the valley of Bear Creek and is surrounded by Flathead National Forest. The BNSF Railway Hi-Line route passes along the northwest side of the valley just outside the CDP. Glacier National Park is to the northwest, across the Hi-Line.

Snowslip was first listed as a CDP prior to the 2020 census.

== Demographics ==
Historical population
Census	Pop.	Note	%±
2020	39		—
U.S. Decennial Census
