= Mission Mountain Railroad =

Shortline railroad in northwestern Montana

Overview
- Headquarters: Columbia Falls, Montana
- Reporting mark: MMT
- Locale: United States in Montana
- Dates of operation: 2004–present

Technical
- Track gauge: 4 ft 8 1/2 in (1,435 mm) standard gauge

The Mission Mountain Railroad (reporting mark MMT) is a shortline railroad in northwestern Montana, operating a segment of the former Great Northern Railway (later Burlington Northern and BNSF) since December 2004. MMT is a subsidiary of Watco, operator of several other shortline railroads.

== Northern segment ==
MMT operates 26 miles of track between Stryker, Trego, Fortine, and Eureka, Montana. From 1904 to 1970, this segment was part of the Great Northern main line, but it became an isolated branch when the Libby Dam and the Flathead Tunnel were built. The main business on this segment is bulk lumber from Eureka brought there via trucks from British Columbia. A new source of business in 2016 was transloading magnetite ore destined for coal mines in southeastern British Columbia onto trucks at Fortine.

== Southern segment ==
Until 30 March 2020, MMT also operated the 14 miles from Columbia Falls to Kalispell, Montana. Originally part of the Great Northern's transcontinental main line, it was rerouted via Whitefish and Eureka in 1904, avoiding the grades of Haskell Pass west of Kalispell. Farther west and south of Kalispell, the former track toward Marion and Somers has become the Great Northern Historical Trail.

MMT served several lumber facilities and a grain elevator in Kalispell. The city of Kalispell removed the remaining downtown trackage, relocating the railroad to Glacier Rail Park, a new industrial park just north of town; abandoning 2.4 miles of the original route, including the downtown crossing of US 93.

BNSF reassumed control of the Kalispell Branch as of April 1, 2020.

== Rolling stock ==
MMT uses a variety of equipment formerly used on other Watco shortlines. Some of the equipment has been repainted for MMT; other units remain in their original Union Pacific and Milwaukee Road paint. A locomotive roster is hosted by TrainWeb.
