= EMD F45 =

US Diesel-electric locomotive

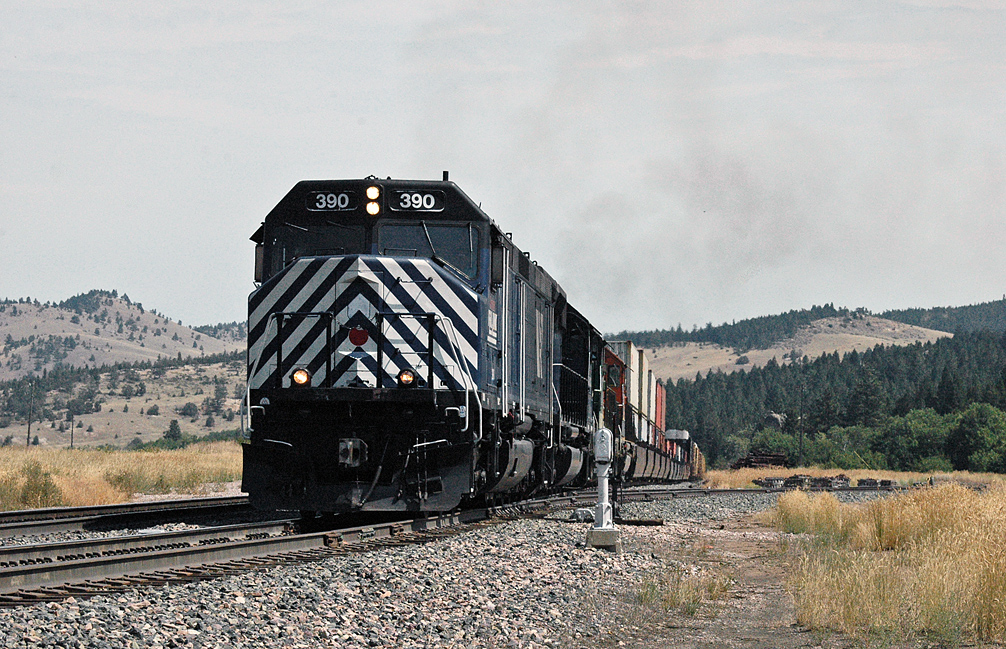
- MRL #390, a F45, leads a freight train in 2005.
Type and origin
- Power type: Diesel-electric
- Builder: General Motors Electro-Motive Division (EMD)
- Model: F45
- Build date: 1968 – 1971
- Total produced: 86
Specifications
- Configuration
  - AAR: C-C
- Gauge: 4 ft 8 1/2 in (1,435 mm)
- Prime mover: EMD 20-645E3
- Engine type: V20 Diesel
- Aspiration: turbocharged
- Cylinders: 20
- Loco brake: Independent air; optional: dynamic brakes
- Train brakes: Air, schedule 26-L
Performance figures
- Power output: 3,600 hp (2,680 kW)
Career
- Operators: Santa Fe, Great Northern, Burlington Northern, Montana Rail Link, Utah Railway, and BNSF
- Locale: United States
- Disposition: One preserved as a lodge, one privately owned, one awaiting restoration, two stored, remainder scrapped

The EMD F45 is a C-C cowled diesel-electric locomotive built by General Motors Electro-Motive Division between 1968 and 1971. Power was provided by an EMD 645E3 20-cylinder engine which generated 3,600 hp (2,680 kW).

== Design ==
After sponsoring the development of the FP45 passenger locomotive, the Santa Fe requested a similar freight locomotive from Electro-Motive. Where the FP45 was an SDP45 wrapped in a full-width cowl carbody, the new F45 was essentially an SD45 given the same treatment.

Where the Santa Fe requested a full-width carbody for aesthetics, the Great Northern saw an opportunity to protect crews from the dangers of winter operation in northern climates.

== Original owners ==
The Santa Fe ordered two lots of twenty each, for 1968 delivery. The FP45s were delivered in Santa Fe's red, yellow and silver warbonnet colors, the forty F45s came in the blue and yellow freight colors. The second order of F45s were equipped with steam lines so that they could be used as trailing units on passenger consists.

Great Northern (GN) ordered an initial lot of six, for 1969 delivery. These were numbered immediately following a previous lot of SD45s. Another lot of eight was ordered before the first six arrived.

GN ordered twelve more for 1970 delivery - they were to be numbered 441-452 - but the GN merged into the Burlington Northern (BN) prior to delivery, so they arrived with BN numbers and paint.

BN followed with a final order for twenty in 1971. Afterwards they returned to ordering SD45s. This final order differed in several small ways from the GN specs.

Order	Built	Serial numbers	Quantity	1st No.	2nd No.	3rd No.	Notes
7105	6/68	34036-34055	20	Santa Fe 1900-1919	Santa Fe 5900-5919	Santa Fe 5950-5969	Dispositions vary
7105	6/68-7/68	34056-34075	20	Santa Fe 1920-1939	Santa Fe 5920-5939	Santa Fe 5970-5989	Built with pass-through steam lines. Dispositions vary
7151	5/69-6/69	34736-34741	6	GN 427-432	BN 6600-6605		All sold to Schnitzer Steel 7/84 for scrap
5750	7/69-8/69	35110-35117	8	GN 433-440	BN 6606-6613		Dispositions vary
5762	7/70-9/70	36341-36352	12	BN 6614-6625			Ordered by GN prior to merger day, delivered after as BN units. All sold to Pielet Brothers 11/86 for scrap
5774	4/71	37166-37185	20	BN 6626-6645			Dispositions vary

== Rebuilds ==
In 1982 and 1983, Santa Fe's San Bernardino shops rebuilt F45s 5900–5939. They emerged as 5950–5989, were painted in a blue and yellow version of the warbonnet, and were redesignated SDF45s. Electrically they were upgraded to SD45-2 standards. Mechanically, they were re-geared from 59:18 to 60:17, reducing their top speed from 89 to 83 mph (143 to 134 km/h). In the mid-1980s Santa Fe again re-geared them - this time to 62:15 for 71 mph (114 km/h).

MotivePower used ex-ATSF 5989 as an EPA Tier-I emissions test bed in 2002. Metra in Chicago had ordered 27 MP36PH-3 passenger locomotives for commuter service. To test their emissions, 5989's 20-645-E3 was replaced with the MP36PH-3's 16-645-F3B and cooling system, and its traction motors removed.

GN 438, later BN 6611, became a load-test box at the Alstom shop in Montreal.

Morrison-Knudsen used the cowls from several scrapped BN F45s to rebuild eleven GP40s into GP40FH-2 locomotives for New Jersey Transit. 4130-4139 were completed in 1987, and 4141 in 1989 (New cowls were fabricated for 4140 and 4142–4144). M-K also used both cowls and cabs from scrapped BN F45s, to construct five F40PHL-2 locomotives on GP40 frames. They were Tri-Rail 801–805, completed in 1988.

== Preservation ==
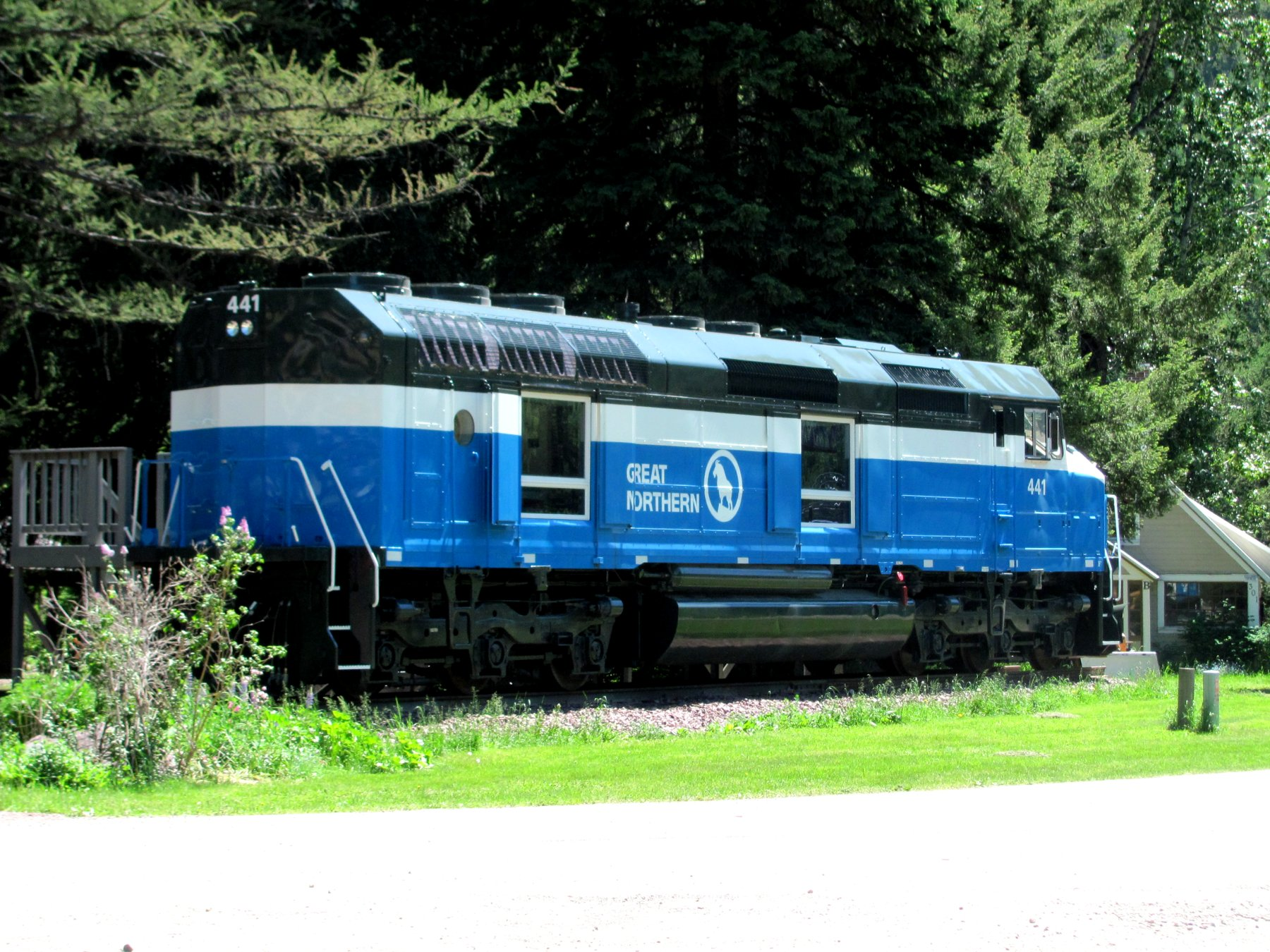
The ex-F45 lodge at the Izaak Walton Inn.

- Former Santa Fe #5960 was purchased by Revelstoke Limited LLC in June 2008. It was set to be scrapped but instead was restored externally as Great Northern 441 (GN's last F45 was 440). It has been converted to a Luxury Locomotive Lodge at the Izaak Walton Inn at Essex, Montana. It arrived at Essex on August 26, 2009, and became available for lodging in January 2010. The interior can sleep up to four people and includes a living room, kitchen, master bedroom and bath. The cab has been restored to the current BNSF Railway specification for new and re-manufactured locomotives. It is the only locomotive in the world that has been converted to luxury living space available for rent.
- Dynamic Railway Preservation was raising money to acquire and restore Montana Rail Link F45 #390, formerly Burlington Northern #6644. The project ended in 2014 when the locomotive was eventually sold to another private owner, and the money that was raised was used to restore SDP40F #644. It currently remains stored in a rail yard in Airway Heights, Washington.
- Former Santa Fe #5989 was used as a test bed by MotivePower Inc. until 2021. It is set to be restored to the "Kodachrome" scheme, with the hope that it will be eventually sent to a museum.

== See also ==
- List of GM-EMD locomotives
- List of GMD Locomotives
