= KRV =

KRV, KrV, krv may refer to:

- Emil (tank) or Kranvagn, 1950s, Sweden
- Kavet Brao language of Cambodia and Laos, ISO 639-3 code
- Karnataka Rakshana Vedike, India, linguistic organization
- Kimwarer Airport, Kenya, IATA code
- Kootenai River Valley, Montana, U.S.
- Kritik der reinen Vernunft, German title of the 1787 philosophical work by Immanuel Kant
