= January 10–13, 2024 North American storm complex =

Category 0 winter storm

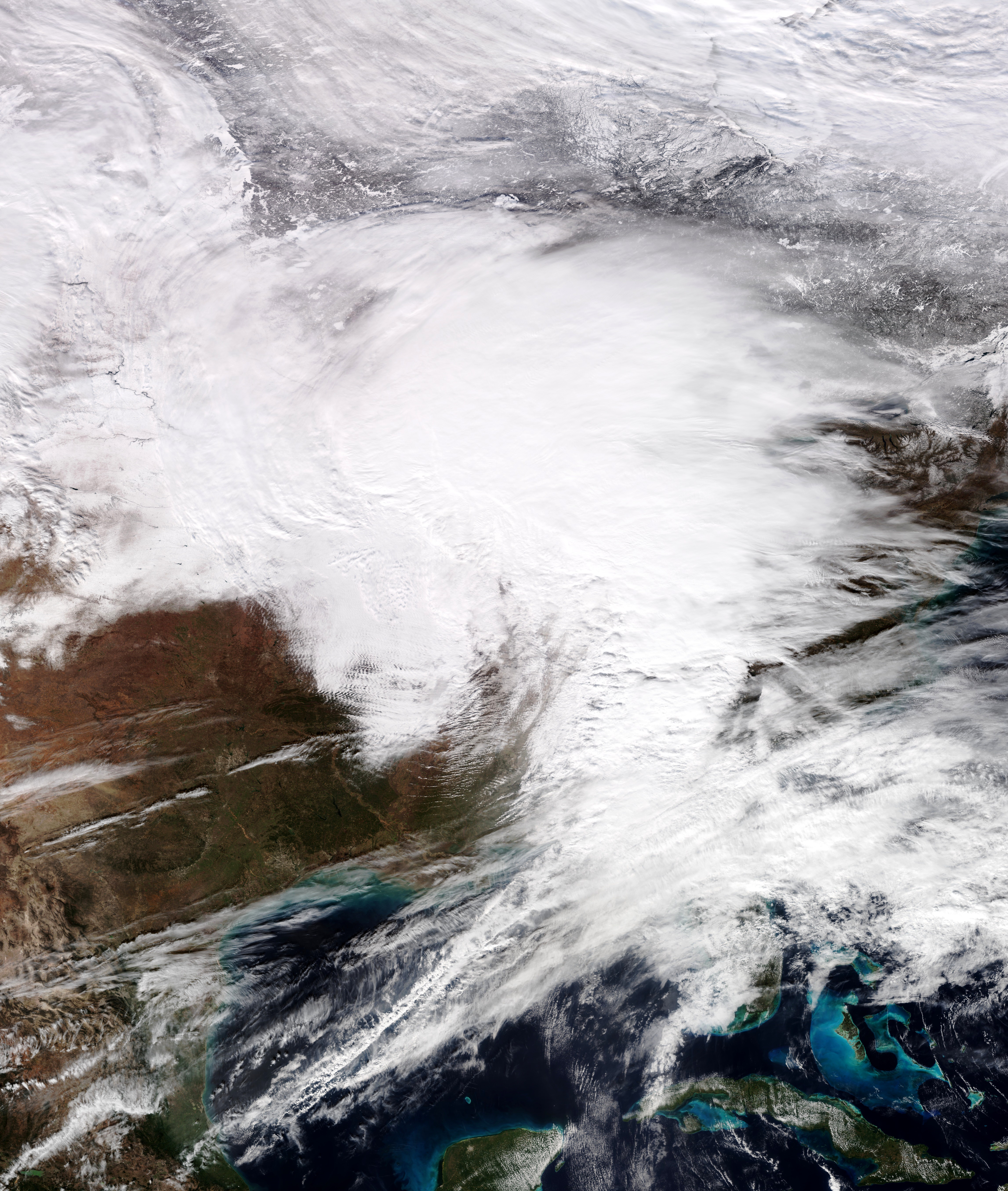

Meteorological history
- Formed: January 10, 2024
- Dissipated: January 14, 2024

Winter storm
- Highest winds: 103 mph (166 km/h) in Pinnacle, Montana on January 10
- Max. snowfall: 41.3 in (105 cm) in Hamburg, New York on January 13–14

Overall effects
- Fatalities: 5
- Areas affected: Northwestern, Midwest and Northeastern United States
- Power outages: 550,000
- Part of the 2023–24 North American winter

A major winter storm hit the United States from January 10–13, 2024. The storm affected areas from the Pacific Northwest to New England, with considerable impacts in the Midwestern United States as well.

== Meteorological history ==
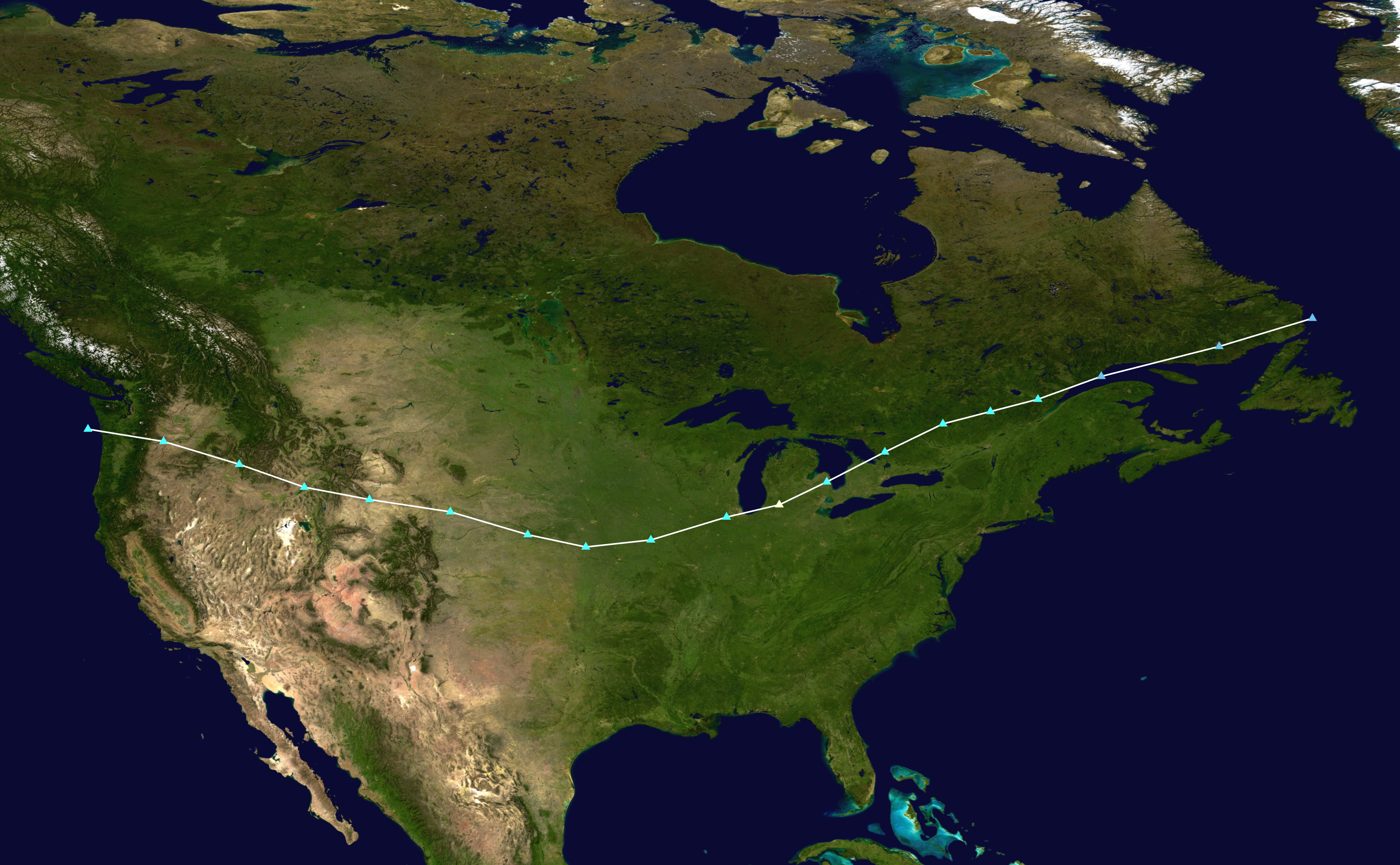
Map plotting the storm's track and intensity, according to the Saffir–Simpson scale Map key Saffir–Simpson scale Tropical depression (≤38 mph, ≤62 km/h) Tropical storm (39–73 mph, 63–118 km/h) Category 1 (74–95 mph, 119–153 km/h) Category 2 (96–110 mph, 154–177 km/h) Category 3 (111–129 mph, 178–208 km/h) Category 4 (130–156 mph, 209–251 km/h) Category 5 (≥157 mph, ≥252 km/h) Unknown Storm type Tropical cyclone Subtropical cyclone Extratropical cyclone, remnant low, tropical disturbance, or monsoon depression

The storm system entered the Pacific Northwest on January 10 and brought blizzard conditions there before diving south into the Sierra Nevada. The storm brought blizzard conditions in Arizona and Kansas and intensified over the Midwestern United States. The storm then brought thundersnow and frost quakes into the Chicago metropolitan area before causing coastal flooding in the Mid-Atlantic region on January 13 and exiting.

== Impact ==
550,000 customers lost power due to the storm.

=== Western United States ===
The storm resulted in blizzard warnings for Oregon and Washington's mountain areas for the first time since 2012. Crater Lake National Park closed due to the winter storm. Stevens Pass recorded 29 in (74 cm) of snow in just 30 hours. Wind gusts reached 103 mph (166 km/h) in Pinnacle, Montana and 97 mph (156 km/h) near Mount Hood. Following the storm, record cold conditions were observed in Washington, with Seattle observing a low of 13 °F (−11 °C), their coldest temperature since 1990. Ski resorts in on Mount Baker closed due to the cold as well. 111,000 outages occurred in Oregon alone. Four people died in the Western United States: three in Oregon, and one person in California.

=== Midwestern United States ===
The state of Oklahoma experienced gusts up to 45 mph (72 km/h) during the storm. Following the storm, much of Central Oklahoma experienced sub-freezing conditions for 4.5 days. Portions of Interstate 70 in Kansas were closed due to the winter weather. Moline, Illinois recorded their second snowiest day on record on January 12, with 15.4 in (39 cm) of snow. At Chicago O'Hare International Airport, over 800 flights were cancelled on January 12 as the storm crossed through. One death occurred in Wisconsin, where snowfall totals reached as high as 18 in (46 cm).

=== Eastern United States ===
A state of emergency and travel ban was declared in Western New York, forcing the playoff game between the Pittsburgh Steelers and the Buffalo Bills to be postponed from January 14 at 1pm to January 15 at 4:30pm. Flooding in Eastern New York resulted in a brief suspension of Amtrak service between New York City and Albany, as well as suspensions on Metro-North Railroad through the Hudson Valley. In New York City, the storm dropped 0.89 in (23 mm) of rain, and several locations saw higher amounts. As a result, the Passaic River crested at 11.3 ft (3.4 m), and widespread coastal flooding occurred, closing down parts of Hudson River Park. Severe flooding led to most roads being impassable in Mystic, Connecticut. Almost ten thousand people lost power in the state of Rhode Island. In Boston, the high tide exceeded its expected value and peaked at 14.41 ft (4.39 m), amidst gusts as high as 38 mph (61 km/h). In Portland, Maine, the water levels hit 14.57 ft (4.44 m), resulting in historic flooding in the city. Property damage in Maine totaled to $76.25 million.

== Aftermath ==
Officials in Oregon warned people to be prepared for lengthy power outages. Following the storms, temperatures dropped significantly, resulting in many burst pipes. The burst pipes caused minor flooding in Portland International Airport. Also, many warming shelters in the state opened, although one was closed due to a burst pipe.

In Omaha, Nebraska, customers were asked to reduce their electricity usage as temperatures dropped and the Missouri River began to freeze.
