= Essex station (Montana) =

Amtrak railway station in Essex, Montana, United States

Essex, MT
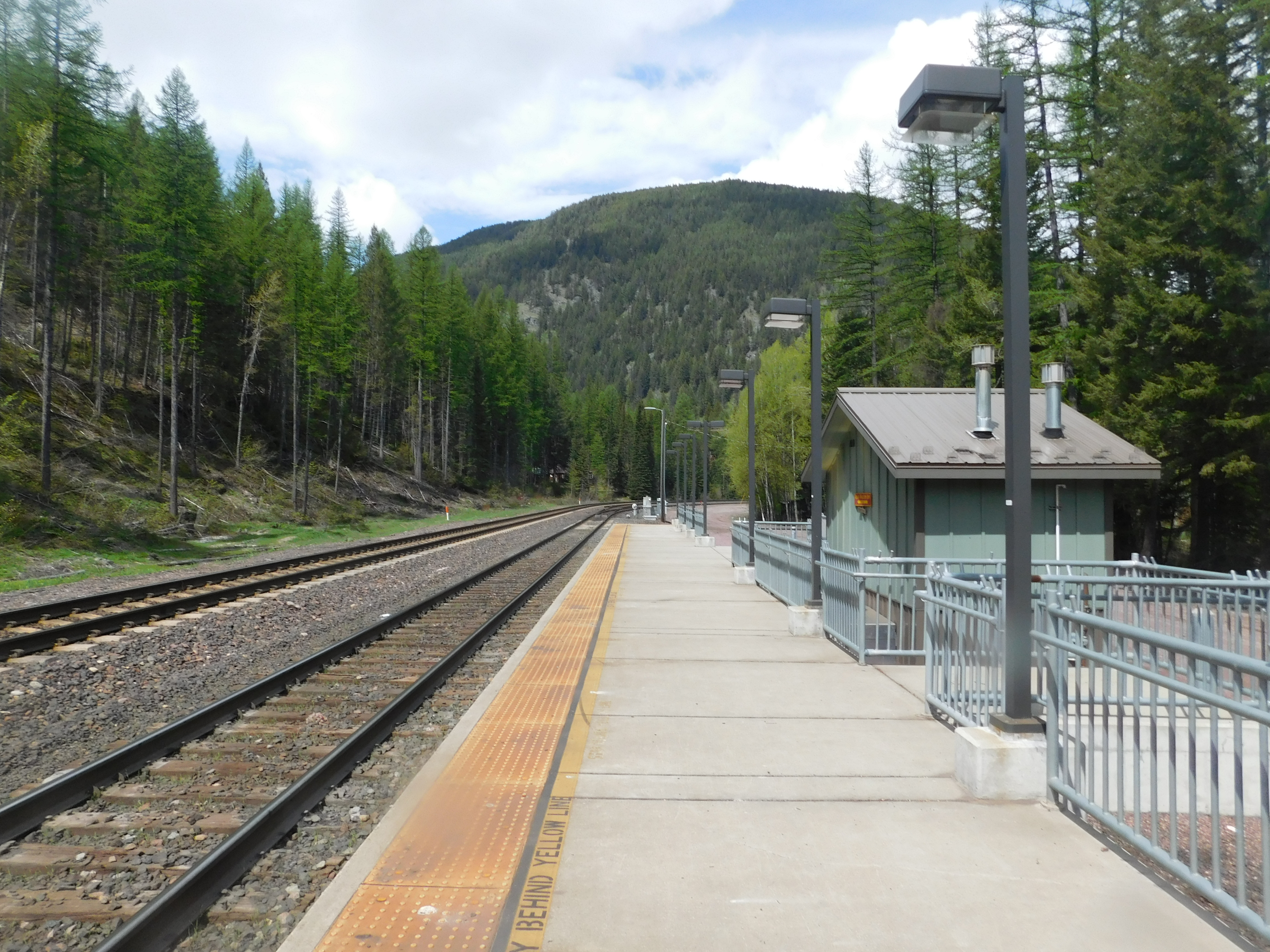
- Essex station platform in May 2017

General information
- Location: 290 Izaak Walton Inn Road; Essex, Montana; United States
- Coordinates: 48.27525°N 113.61030°W
- Owner: BNSF Railway/Izaak Walton Inn
- Line: BNSF Hi Line Subdivision
- Platforms: 1 side platform
- Tracks: 2

Construction
- Accessible: Yes

Other information
- Station code: Amtrak: ESM

History
- Opened: June 18, 1893 (Great Northern Railway); March 1985 (Amtrak; conditional stop); November 1985 (Amtrak; flag stop)

Passengers
- FY 2025: 1,005 (Amtrak)

Services
| Preceding station | Amtrak | Following station |
|---|---|---|
| West Glacier toward Seattle or Portland | Empire Builder | East Glacier Park (April–October) toward Chicago |
| West Glacier toward Seattle or Portland | Empire Builder | Browning (October–April) toward Chicago |
Location

Essex station is a stop on Amtrak's Empire Builder line in Essex, Montana, United States. Essex has a year-round population of less than 50; most passengers are visitors to the historic Izaak Walton Inn located about 3/10 mile (0.48 km) away.

There currently is no station building. Essex is a flag stop. The stop is skipped in the event that there are no passengers listed in Amtrak’s digital reservation system to alight or board at the station.

Between 1970 and 1985 there were no regular stops at Essex. In late 2010, Amtrak built a concrete platform with embedded heating coils for automatic snow clearance to replace the former asphalt platform, and also added additional lighting and fencing.

In February 2026, it was announced that the Inn will close permanently on March 1, 2026, rendering the future of the station unclear.
