= Little Bitterroot Lake, Montana =

Unincorporated community in Montana, United States

- Census-designated place
- Location within Montana
- Coordinates: 48°7′31″N 114°43′55″W
- Country: United States
- State: Montana
- County: Flathead

Area
  - Total: 13.15 sq mi (34.05 km^{2})
  - Land: 8.43 sq mi (21.83 km^{2})
  - Water: 4.72 sq mi (12.23 km^{2})
- Elevation: 3,908 ft (1,191 m)

Population (2020)
  - Total: 154
  - Density: 18.3/sq mi (7.06/km^{2})
- Time zone: UTC-7 (Mountain (MST))
  - Summer (DST): UTC-6 (MDT)
- Area code: 406
- FIPS code: 30-43830
- GNIS feature ID: 2583823

Little Bitterroot Lake is a census-designated place (CDP) in Flathead County, Montana, United States. As of the 2020 census, Little Bitterroot Lake had a population of 154. The town is next to Little Bitterroot Lake.

== Demographics ==
Historical population
Census	Pop.	Note	%±
2020	154		—
U.S. Decennial Census
