= Batavia, Montana =

Unincorporated community in Montana, United States

- Census-designated place
- Location within Montana
- Coordinates: 48°10′39″N 114°24′26″W
- Country: United States
- State: Montana
- County: Flathead

Area
  - Total: 1.81 sq mi (4.68 km^{2})
  - Land: 1.81 sq mi (4.68 km^{2})
  - Water: 0 sq mi (0.00 km^{2})
- Elevation: 3,143 ft (958 m)

Population (2020)
  - Total: 368
  - Density: 203.8/sq mi (78.67/km^{2})
- Time zone: UTC-7 (Mountain (MST))
  - Summer (DST): UTC-6 (MDT)
- Area code: 406
- FIPS code: 30-04230
- GNIS feature ID: 2583787

Batavia is a census-designated place (CDP) in Flathead County, Montana, United States. As of the 2020 census, Batavia had a population of 368.

U.S. Route 2 passes through town. It is 6 miles from Kalispell. Nearby is the Batavia Waterfowl Production Area.

== Demographics ==
Historical population
Census	Pop.	Note	%±
2020	368		—
U.S. Decennial Census
