= Helena Flats, Montana =

Unincorporated community in Montana, United States

- Census-designated place
- Location within Montana
- Coordinates: 48°16′49″N 114°14′13″W
- Country: United States
- State: Montana
- County: Flathead

Area
  - Total: 8.71 sq mi (22.56 km^{2})
  - Land: 8.44 sq mi (21.86 km^{2})
  - Water: 0.27 sq mi (0.70 km^{2})
- Elevation: 2,956 ft (901 m)

Population (2020)
  - Total: 1,206
  - Density: 142.9/sq mi (55.18/km^{2})
- Time zone: UTC-7 (Mountain (MST))
  - Summer (DST): UTC-6 (MDT)
- Area code: 406
- FIPS code: 30-35622
- GNIS feature ID: 2583815

Helena Flats is a census-designated place (CDP) in Flathead County, Montana, United States. The population was 1,206 in the 2020 census.

== Demographics ==
Historical population
Census	Pop.	Note	%±
2020	1,206		—
U.S. Decennial Census
