= Rhodes, Montana =

Unincorporated community in Montana, United States

- Census-designated place
- Location within Montana Location within the United States
- Coordinates: 48°16′44″N 114°28′27″W
- Country: United States
- State: Montana
- County: Flathead

Area
  - Total: 0.67 sq mi (1.73 km^{2})
  - Land: 0.67 sq mi (1.73 km^{2})
  - Water: 0 sq mi (0.00 km^{2})
- Elevation: 3,268 ft (996 m)

Population (2020)
  - Total: 146
  - Density: 218.3/sq mi (84.27/km^{2})
- Time zone: UTC-7 (Mountain (MST))
  - Summer (DST): UTC-6 (MDT)
- ZIP Code: 59901 (Kalispell)
- Area code: 406
- FIPS code: 30-62230
- GNIS feature ID: 2806617

Rhodes is an unincorporated community and census-designated place (CDP) in Flathead County, Montana, United States. It is in the western part of the county, in the valley of Big Lost Creek where it emerges from Rhodes Draw. It is 12 miles (19 km) northwest of Kalispell, the county seat.

As of the 2020 census, Rhodes had a population of 146.

Rhodes was first listed as a CDP prior to the 2020 census.

== Demographics ==
Historical population
Census	Pop.	Note	%±
2020	146		—
U.S. Decennial Census
