= St. Paul Subdivision =

Railway line in Minnesota

The St. Paul Subdivision or St. Paul Sub is a 30.9-mile (49.7 km) railway line running within the state of Minnesota. The line originates in Minneapolis and continues through neighboring Saint Paul, Minnesota and on into Saint Paul's southeastern suburbs along the Mississippi River. It is a segment of BNSF Railway's Northern Transcon which runs from Chicago, Illinois to Seattle, Washington. Between Minneapolis and Saint Paul themselves, this route runs on former Northern Pacific Railway trackage, and forms the northern set of BNSF tracks running through the Twin Cities. The companion route running slightly to the south is the Midway Subdivision, though the St. Paul Subdivision is the busier set of tracks, hosting about 59 trains per day as of April 2009. It is the second-busiest rail line in the state, after the segment of the Staples Subdivision between Fridley and Coon Rapids.
