= Pinnacle, Montana =

Unincorporated community in Montana, United States

- Census-designated place
- Location within Montana Location within the United States
- Coordinates: 48°21′19″N 113°38′54″W
- Country: United States
- State: Montana
- County: Flathead

Area
  - Total: 0.60 sq mi (1.55 km^{2})
  - Land: 0.57 sq mi (1.47 km^{2})
  - Water: 0.031 sq mi (0.08 km^{2})
- Elevation: 3,688 ft (1,124 m)

Population (2020)
  - Total: 45
  - Density: 80/sq mi (30.7/km^{2})
- Time zone: UTC-7 (Mountain (MST))
  - Summer (DST): UTC-6 (MDT)
- ZIP Code: 59916 (Essex)
- Area code: 406
- FIPS code: 30-57775
- GNIS feature ID: 2806615

Pinnacle is an unincorporated community and census-designated place (CDP) in Flathead County, Montana, United States. It is in the eastern part of the county, along U.S. Route 2 in the valley of the Middle Fork Flathead River. It is 6 miles (10 km) north of Essex and 20 miles (32 km) southeast of West Glacier. The community is bordered to the east, across the Middle Fork, by Glacier National Park, and to the west by Flathead National Forest.

Pinnacle was first listed as a CDP prior to the 2020 census. As of the 2020 census, Pinnacle had a population of 45.

== Demographics ==
Historical population
Census	Pop.	Note	%±
2020	45		—
U.S. Decennial Census
