= Forest Hill Village, Montana =

Unincorporated community in Montana, United States

- Census-designated place
- Location within Montana
- Coordinates: 48°07′25″N 114°15′35″W
- Country: United States
- State: Montana
- County: Flathead

Area
  - Total: 1.56 sq mi (4.03 km^{2})
  - Land: 1.54 sq mi (4.00 km^{2})
  - Water: 0.015 sq mi (0.04 km^{2})
- Elevation: 3,009 ft (917 m)

Population (2020)
  - Total: 241
  - Density: 156.2/sq mi (60.32/km^{2})
- Time zone: UTC-7 (Mountain (MST))
  - Summer (DST): UTC-6 (MDT)
- Area code: 406
- FIPS code: 30-27595
- GNIS feature ID: 2583808

Forest Hill Village is a census-designated place (CDP) in Flathead County, Montana, United States. As of the 2020 census, Forest Hill Village had a population of 241. It is located on U.S. Route 93, 6 miles south of Kalispell. It is just north of Flathead Lake.

== Demographics ==
Historical population
Census	Pop.	Note	%±
2020	241		—
U.S. Decennial Census
