= Spokane Subdivision =

Railway line in Idaho and Washington State

The Spokane Subdivision or Spokane Sub is a railway line running between Sandpoint, Idaho and Spokane, Washington. It forms a part of the Northern Transcon. The line has shared track rights with Union Pacific Railway. The Amtrak Empire Builder uses the line and stops in Sandpoint and Spokane.

The length of the subdivision has fluctuated throughout its service history, with a majority of the east end of the line operating under the Kootenai River Subdivision in the 2010s.

== Union Pacific ==
The Union Pacific Railway uses the Spokane Subdivision between UP Junction to the south and Napa Street Junction to the north under trackage rights in place since 1973. At Napa Street, the mainline continues north to British Columbia on the former Spokane International Railroad. At UP Junction, the mainline continues south to Hinkle over the Ayer Subdivision.

== Amtrak ==
Spokane plays an important role in the routes associated with the Empire Builder. The train splits or joins together at the Spokane Amtrak Depot. The route going east to Chicago starts in Seattle and operates under route No. 8. The route No. 28, starts in Portland and also goes east. In Spokane, the two routes converge and the two separate trains are linked together. They proceed eastward as one train under the unified route No. 8. The route heading westward from Chicago, No. 7, is split into two trains Spokane. The No. 7 continues to Seattle, while the other half continues to Portland under the route No. 27.
