= Midway Subdivision =

Railway line in Minnesota

The Midway Subdivision or Midway Sub is a 12.4-mile (20.0 km) railway line in Minneapolis and Saint Paul, Minnesota. The line is part of BNSF Railway's Northern Transcon which runs from Chicago, Illinois to Seattle, Washington and Portland, Oregon. This is former Great Northern Railway trackage, and now forms the southern set of BNSF tracks running through the Twin Cities. The companion route running slightly to the north is the St. Paul Subdivision, former Northern Pacific Railway tracks. The Midway Subdivision hosts about 24 trains per day as of September 2015.

This line has access to an intermodal container facility at BNSF's Midway Yard. The Minnesota Commercial Railway has multiple connections to this line, and Amtrak's Midway station is on Minnesota Commercial tracks just to the south of the Midway Yard.

In the west, the Midway Subdivision carries the Northstar Line commuter rail service as it exits the Wayzata Subdivision where Target Field station is located. The Wayzata Sub meets the Midway Subdivision at Minneapolis Junction, where the Milwaukee Road 261 steam locomotive is housed. The Northstar Line does not have any stops on the Midway Subdivision, but continues north through the Northtown Yard and has its first stop at Fridley at the southern/eastern end of the Staples Subdivision.
