= Flathead Tunnel =

Rail tunnel in Montana, United States

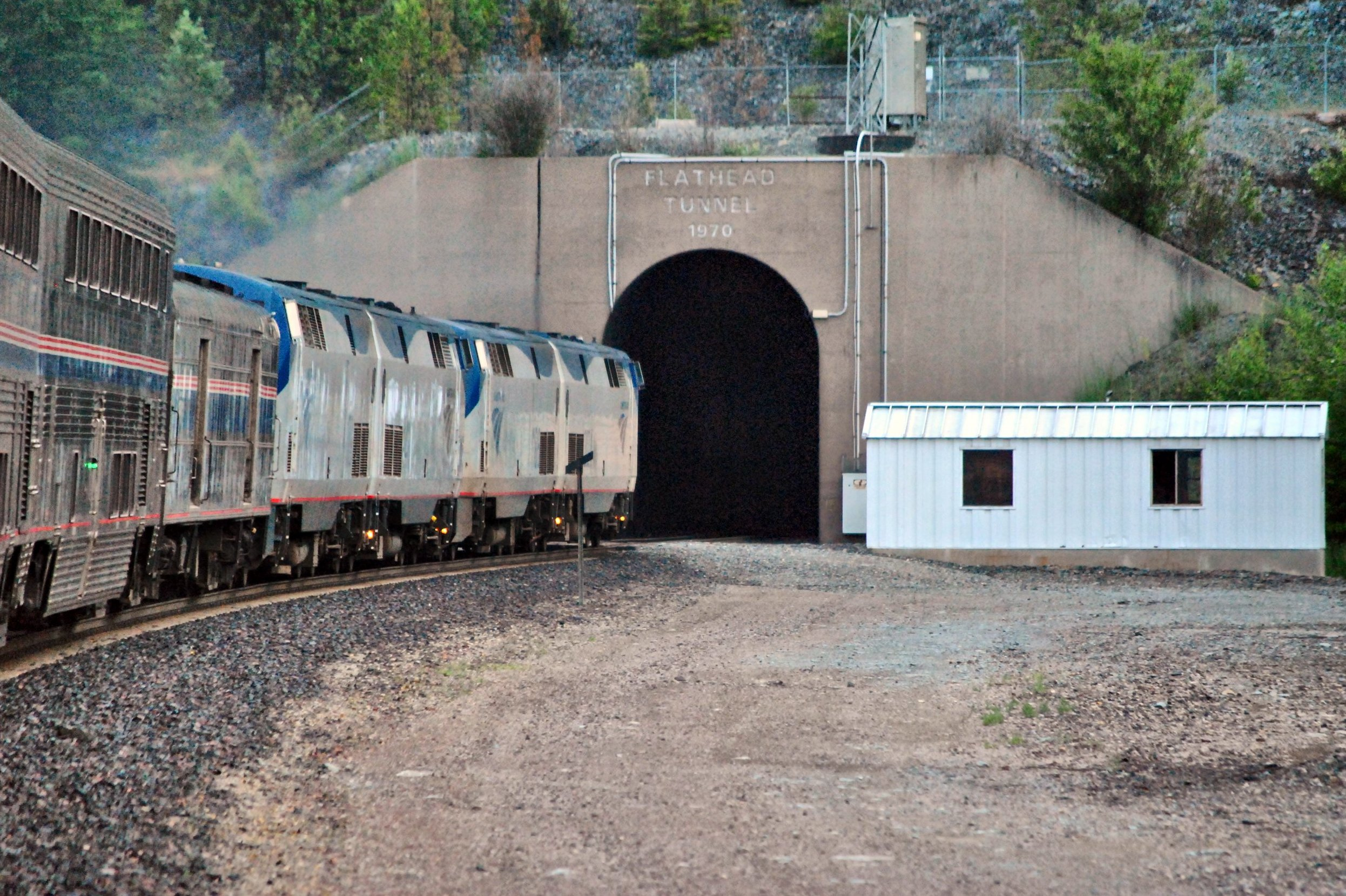
- Eastbound Empire Builder enters Flathead Tunnel
- Interactive map of Flathead Tunnel

Overview
- Line: Kootenai River Subdivision (Northern Transcon)
- Location: Lincoln County, Montana, USA
- Coordinates: 48°33′03″N 114°57′22″W
- System: BNSF

Operation
- Work began: May 12, 1966
- Constructed: blasted with cut and cover portals
- Opened: November 7, 1970
- Owner: BNSF Railway
- Traffic: 40 trains daily (as of 2022)

Technical
- Length: 36,955 ft (7.0 mi; 11.3 km)
- No. of tracks: Single
- Track gauge: 4 ft 8 1/2 in (1,435 mm) standard gauge
- Max elevation: 3,720 ft (1,130 m)
- Min elevation: 3,620 ft (1,100 m)

The Flathead Tunnel is a 7-mile-long (11 km) railroad tunnel in the Rocky Mountains of northwest Montana near Trego, approximately 28 miles (45 km) west of Whitefish. Located on the BNSF Railway's Kootenai River Subdivision, it is the second-longest railroad tunnel in the United States after the Cascade Tunnel. It is ultimately named after the Bitterroot Salish, also known as the Flathead.

The tunnel was constructed for the Great Northern Railway by the Walsh Construction Company and S.J. Groves and Sons (collectively known as Walsh–Groves) at a cost of nearly $44 million (equivalent to $324 million in 2024). It is part of a 60-mile (97 km) rerouting of the Great Northern Hi-Line that became a necessity due to construction of Libby Dam and subsequent creation of Lake Koocanusa.

Work began on May 12, 1966. Drilling was completed on June 21, 1968 when President Lyndon B. Johnson ceremoniously triggered a final explosion from a circuit connected via telephone to the White House.

Finishing work continued for the following two years, and the tunnel, along with the entire rerouted rail line it is a part of, opened on November 1, 1970. An opening ceremony was held on November 7, 1970 and included the passage of the first official train through the tunnel, a 21-car passenger special carrying 1,200 area residents who were offered the opportunity to travel a circular route from Libby and back on both the new and old rail lines.

Official records indicate that two people were killed in two separate incidents during construction, both occurring after drilling was complete.

As of 2022, the tunnel is used by about 40 freight trains each day as well as Amtrak's Empire Builder. Maximum speed through the tunnel is 50 miles per hour (80 km/h). The north portal contains a ventilation system to clear the tunnel of diesel locomotive exhaust and provide cooling air to eastbound locomotives, as there is an uphill grade heading eastbound.
