= Haskell Pass =

- Location within Montana
- Elevation: 4,300 feet (1,300 m)
- Traversed by: Pleasant Valley Road (unpaved)

Third Approach
- Location: Flathead county, Montana, U.S.
- Range: Salish Range
- Coordinates: 48°09′47″N 114°44′50″W

Haskell Pass, elevation 4300 feet, is a historically significant but now little-used mountain pass in northwestern Montana, between the Flathead and Kootenai River drainages. From 1892 to 1904 it was traversed by the original main line of the Great Northern Railway from Kalispell to Libby. This route was abandoned in favor of a longer but flatter route via the Stillwater, Tobacco, and Kootenai Rivers.

On the west side of the pass, much of the gravel Pleasant Valley Road lies atop the old roadbed. Near the summit, little evidence remains of the railroad with part of the 1400 feet summit tunnel having collapsed. East of Marion, Montana, the abandoned roadbed has become the Great Northern Historical Trail.1
