= Izaak Walton Inn =

Historic railway inn in Montana

- U.S. National Register of Historic Places
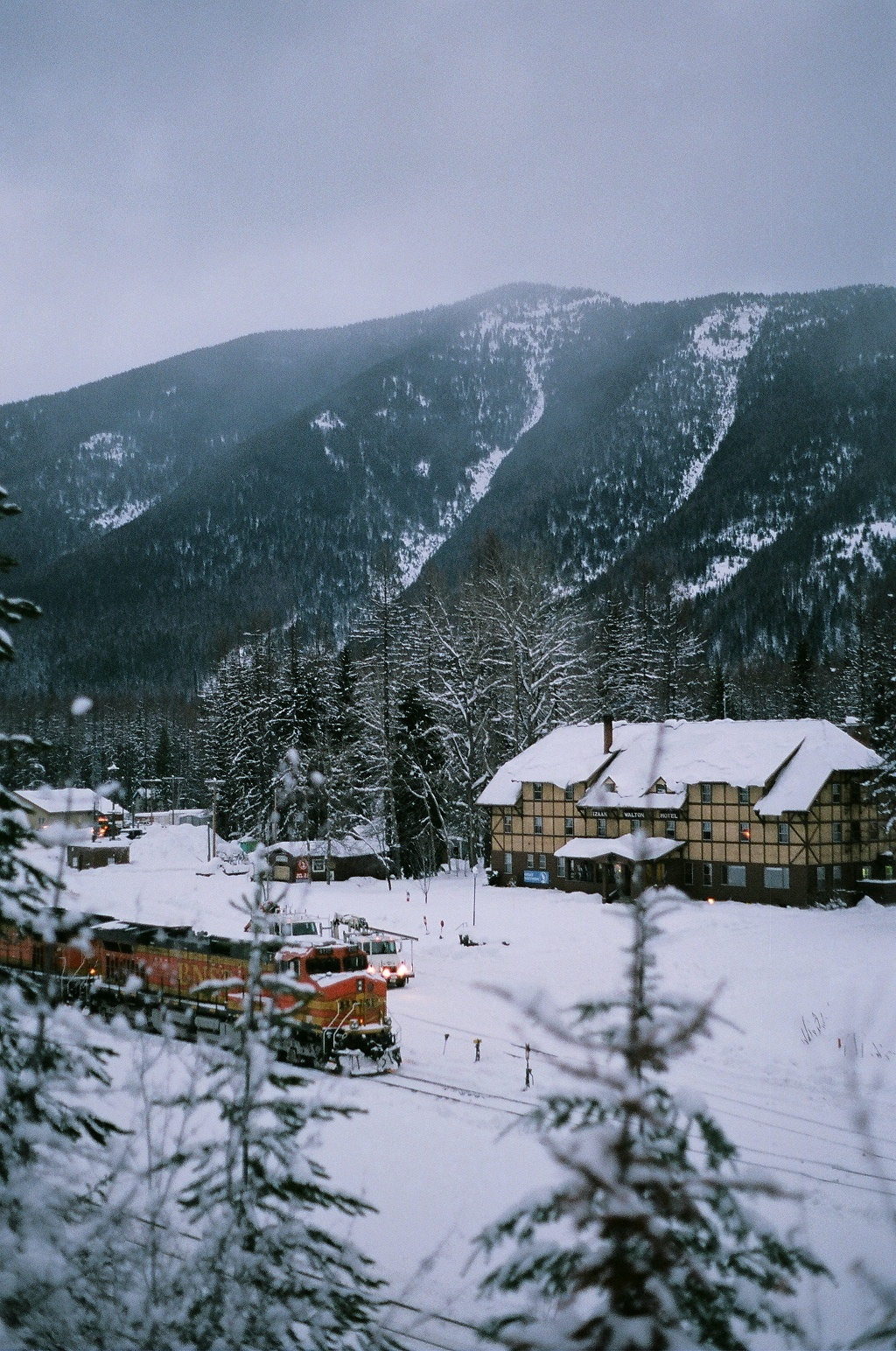
- The Inn and tracks

- Location within Montana
- Location: 290 Izaak Walton Inn Road; Essex, Montana
- Coordinates: 48°16′43″N 113°36′42″W
- Built: 1939
- Architect: Miller, Addison, Co.
- Architectural style: Tudor Revival
- Website: izaakwaltoninn.com
- NRHP reference No.: 85003235
- Added to NRHP: October 18, 1985

The Izaak Walton Inn is a historic inn in Essex, Montana, United States. It was originally built as the Izaak Walton Hotel in 1939 by the Addison Miller company under contract from the Great Northern Railway as a soup kitchen and lodgings for railway workers. The hotel was also originally envisioned as a potential official southern gateway to Glacier National Park, hence its size, but World War II intervened and that plan never materialized. The inn is served by Essex station, the only request stop on Amtrak's Empire Builder route.

The Tudor Revival-style inn is named after Sir Izaak Walton, the English writer and fisherman. Its location, Essex, was originally named Walton. The structure was listed on the National Register of Historic Places in 1985. At Essex, the railway workers asked for some kind of accommodation. About 400 people lived in the town of Essex in the 1920s, and some workers were able to obtain houses there. However, many intermittent workers were forced to seek shelter in wall tents, abandoned railroad cars and other improvised structures, even during the winter. Before the inn was built, there was only a "beanery", a restaurant with no lodging facilities (built in 1910 and 1920s; both structures were destroyed by fire).

The inn has 33 rooms within the inn itself, with some other space in refurbished cabooses, EMD F45 Diesel Locomotive 441, etc. It has been privately owned since the 1950s.

In December 2022, the inn was purchased for US$13.5 million by Washington-based hospitality company LOGE Camps (pronounced "lodge"). LOGE entered bankruptcy in 2026, closing the inn.

== Gallery ==
Izaak Walton Inn
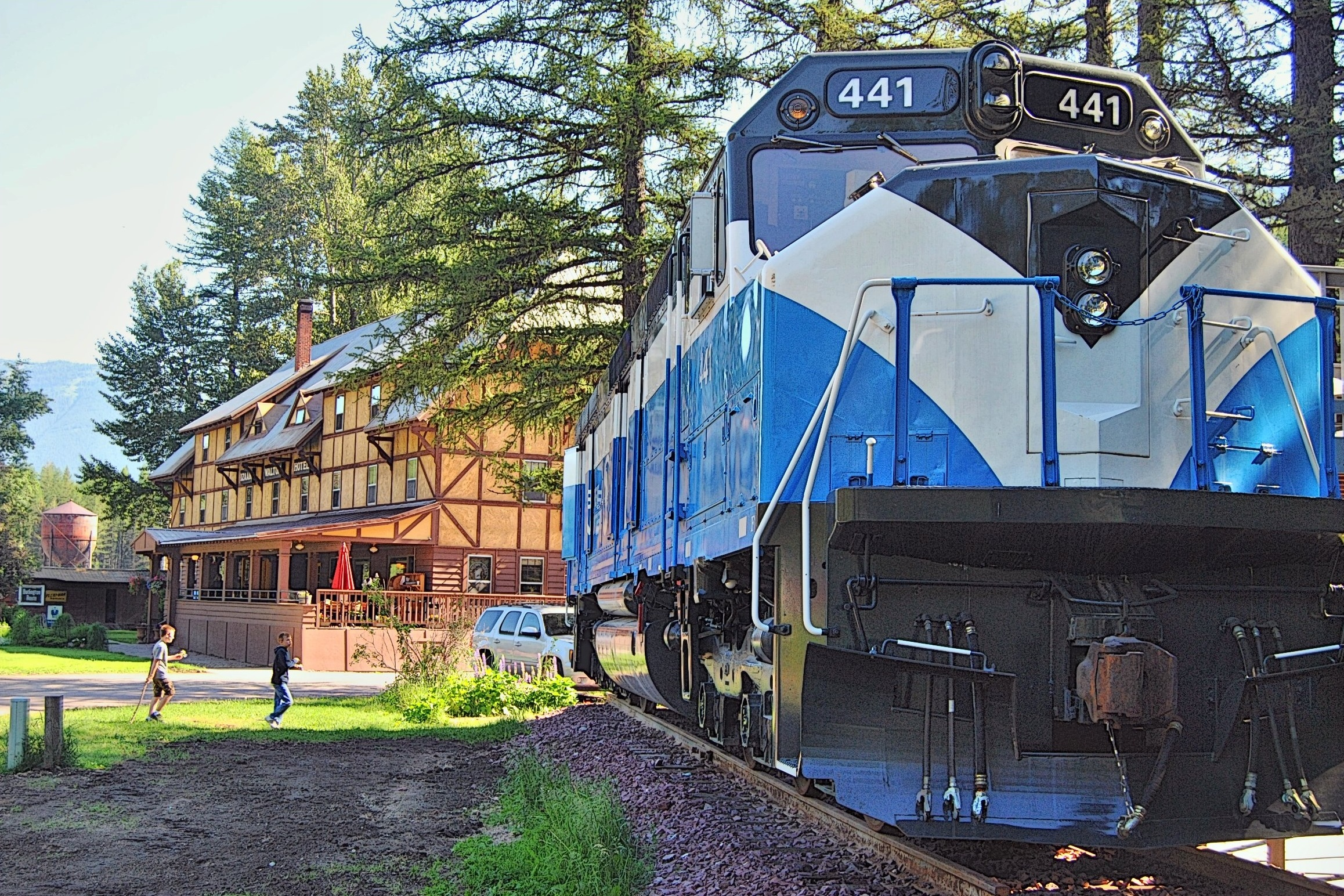
GN441 Locomotive converted to a luxury lodge

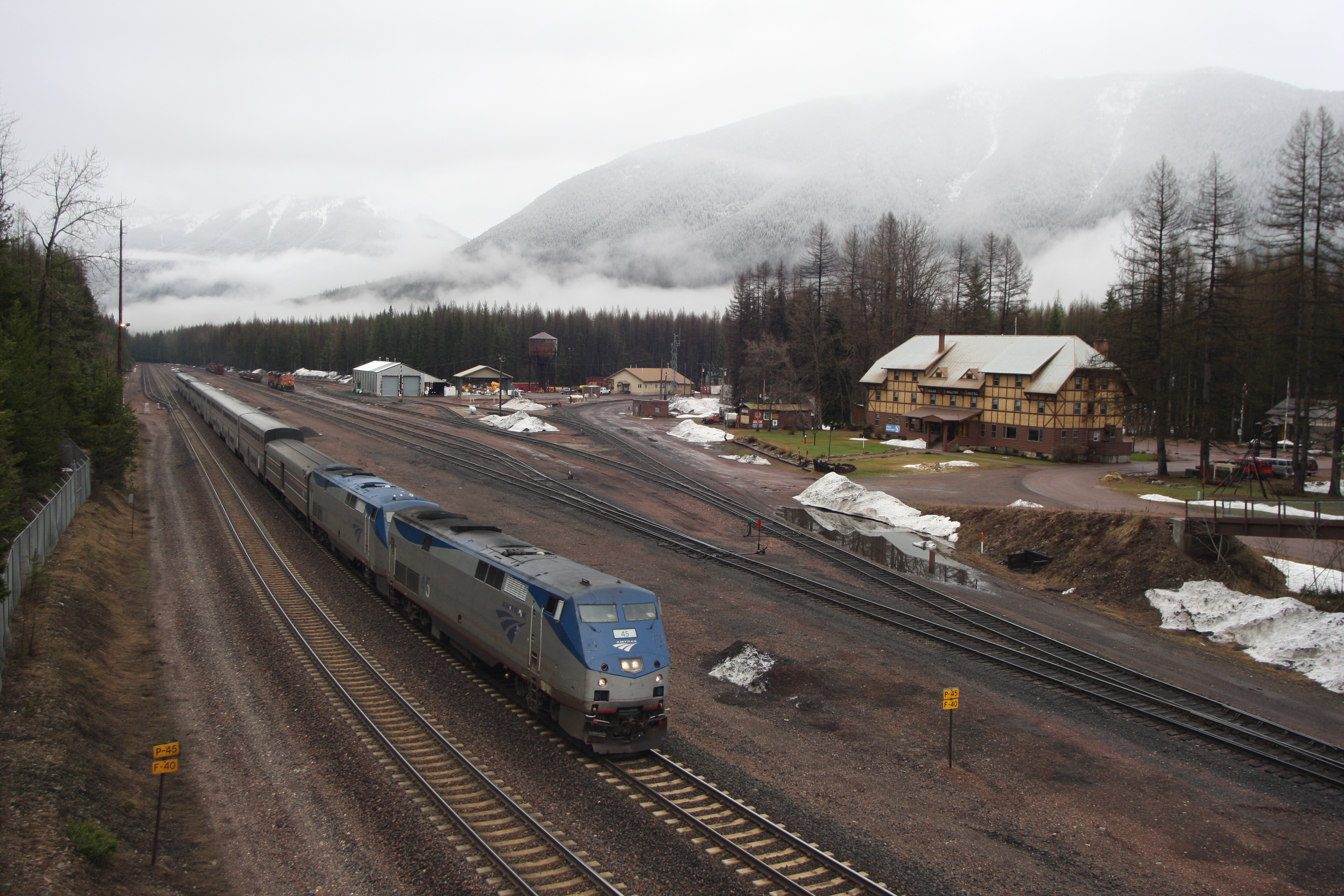
The Empire Builder passing the Izaak Walton Inn

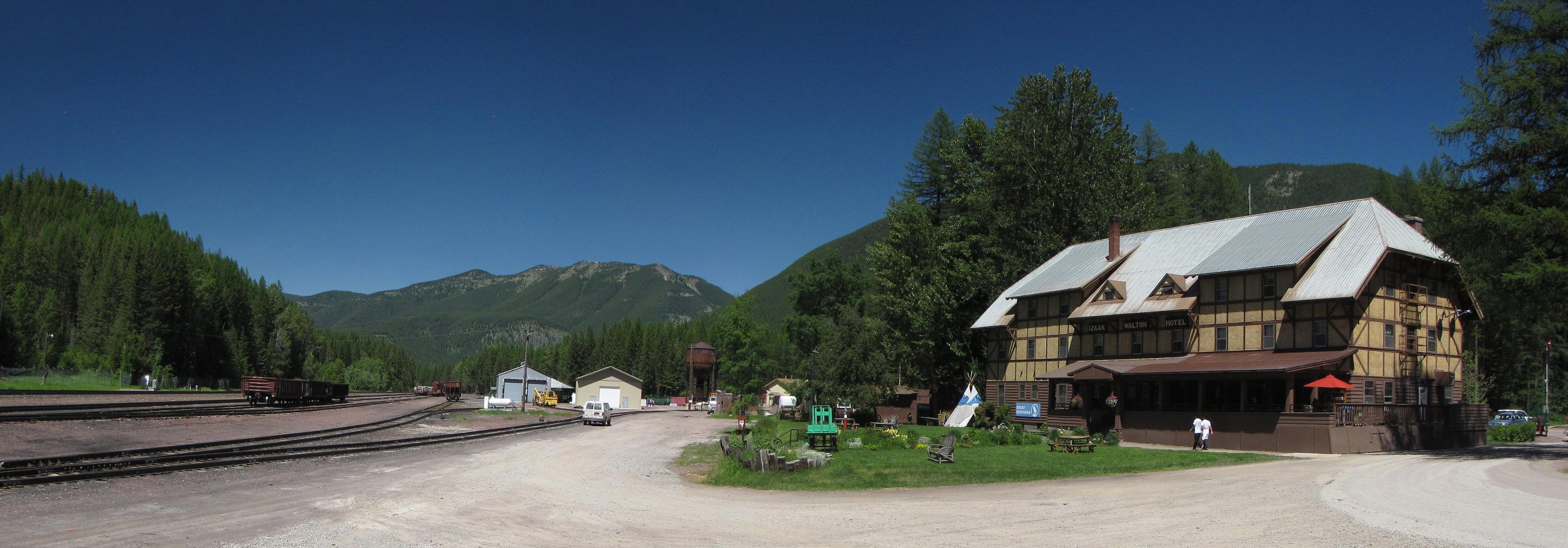
The Izaak Walton Inn is built next to a railroad helper station

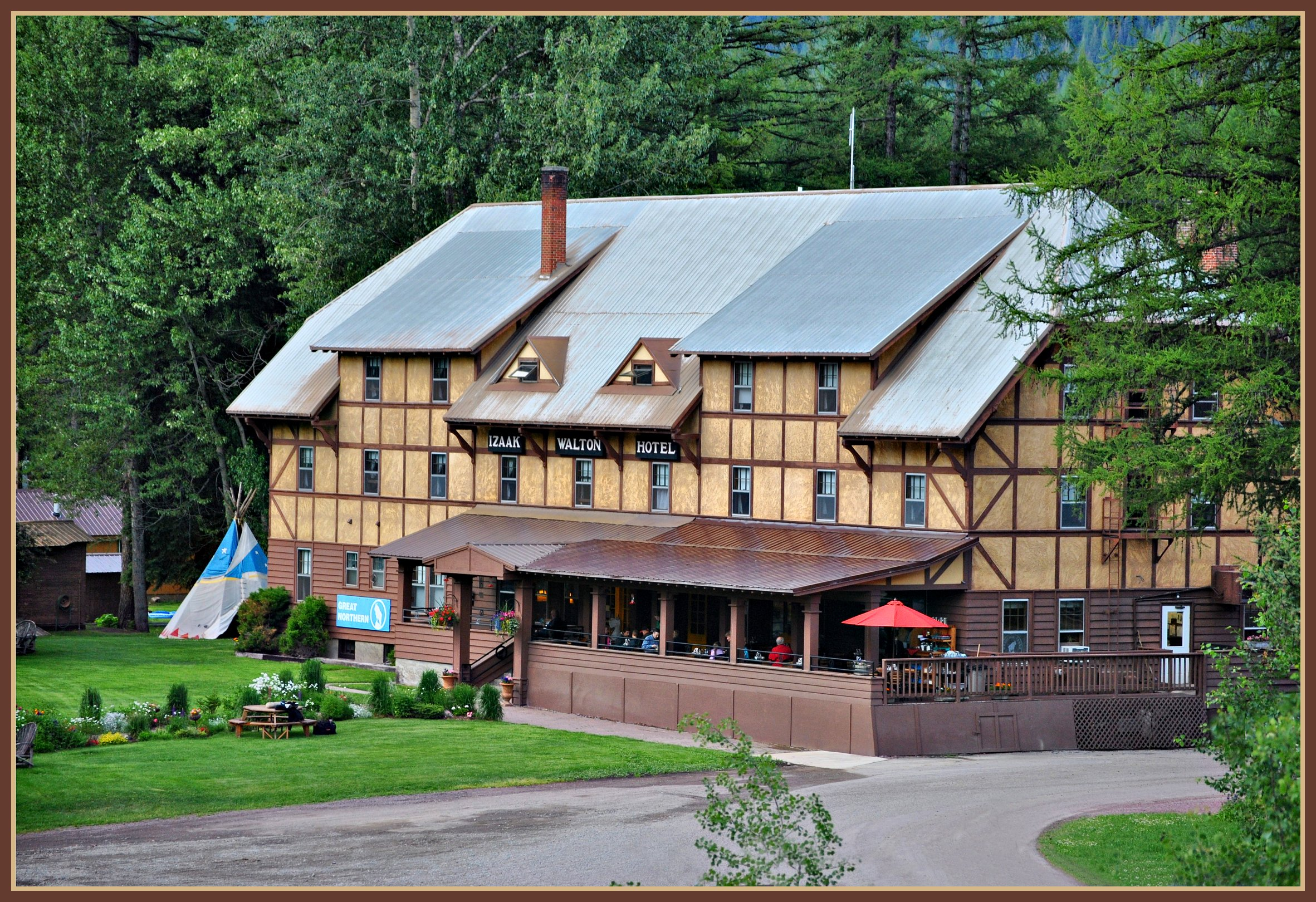
Track-facing side of the Izaak Walton Inn

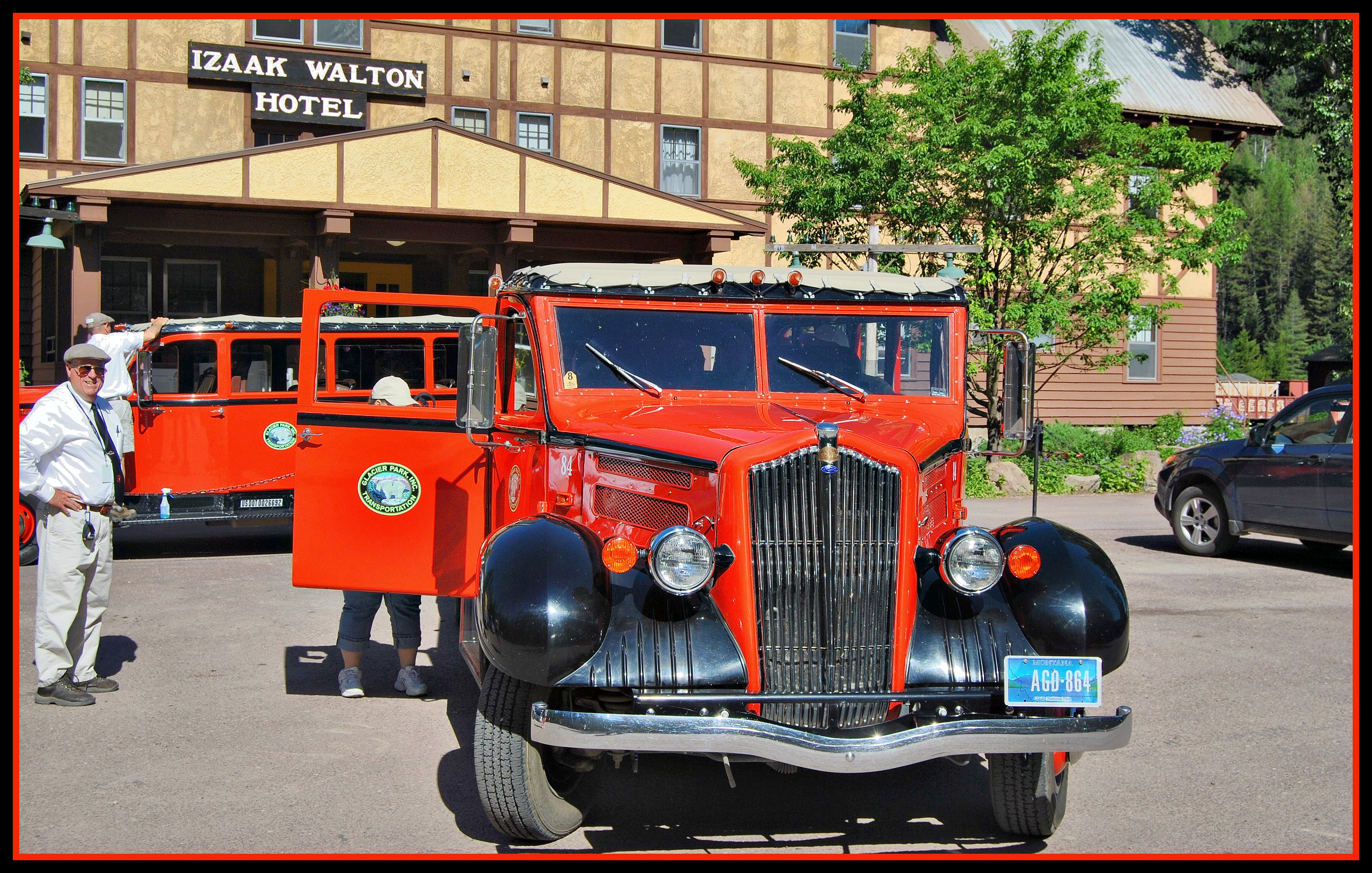
Vintage shuttle from Essex station to the Izaak Walton Inn

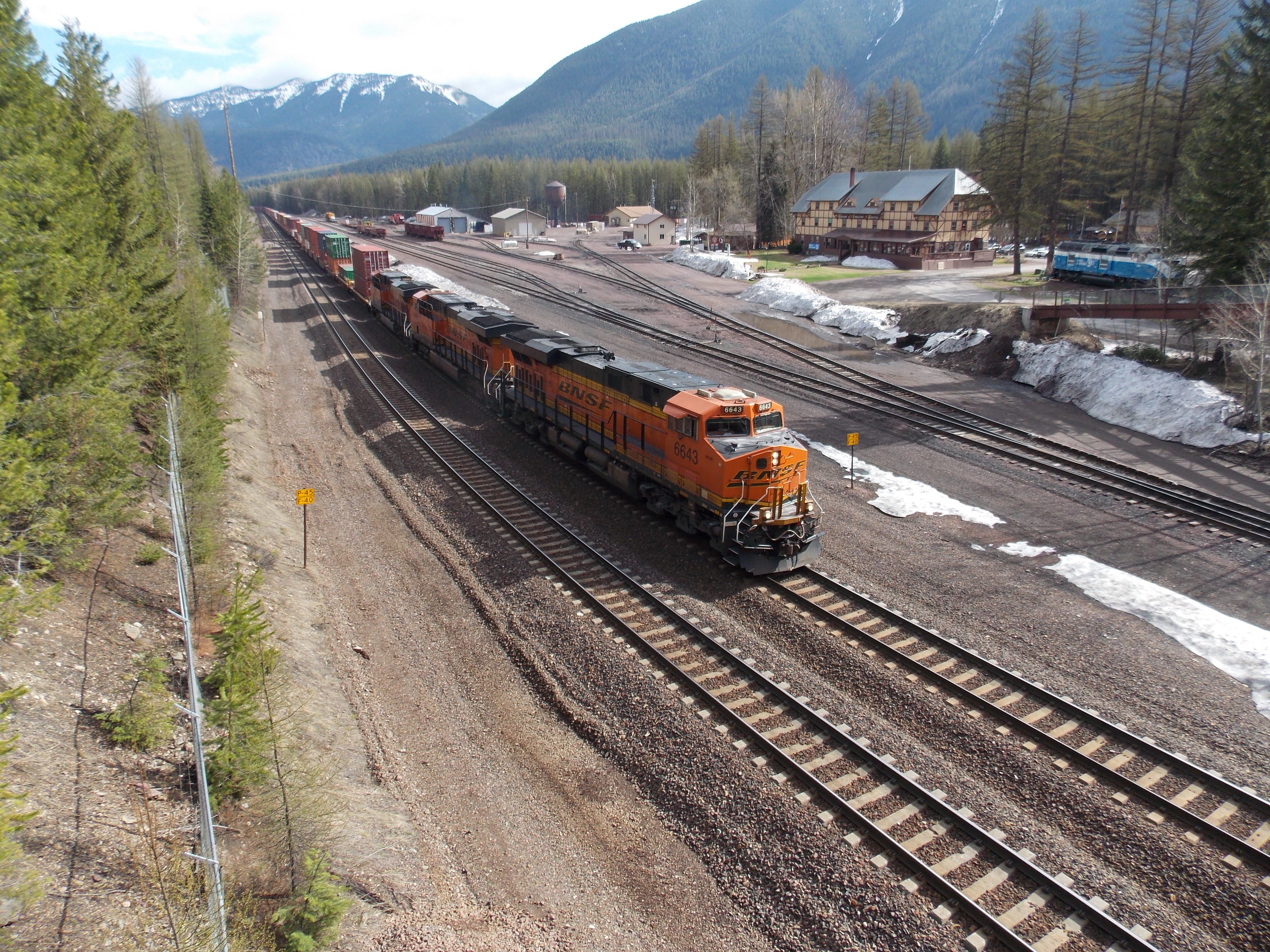
BNSF Intermodal Train passing by the Izaak Walton Inn
