= Marion, Montana =

Unincorporated community in Montana, United States

- Census-designated place
- Location within Montana Location within the United States
- Coordinates: 48°06′20″N 114°39′47″W
- Country: United States
- State: Montana
- County: Flathead

Area
  - Total: 16.92 sq mi (43.82 km^{2})
  - Land: 16.87 sq mi (43.69 km^{2})
  - Water: 0.050 sq mi (0.13 km^{2})
- Elevation: 4,042 ft (1,232 m)

Population (2020)
  - Total: 1,119
  - Density: 66.3/sq mi (25.61/km^{2})
- Time zone: UTC-7 (Mountain (MST))
  - Summer (DST): UTC-6 (MDT)
- ZIP code: 59925
- Area code: 406
- GNIS feature ID: 2583826

Marion is a census-designated place and unincorporated community in Flathead County, Montana, United States. Its population was 1,119 as of the 2020 census. Marion has a post office with ZIP code 59925.

The Great Northern Railway created Marion in 1891 as the terminus of a short spur line that ran west from Kalispell. Between 1892 and 1902, this would be part of the Great Northern Main Line between Columbia Falls and Libby through Haskell Pass. The post office in Marion was established in 1892.

Located just off of U.S. Route 2, Marion is 21 miles from Kalispell. The town is next to Little Bitterroot Lake.

The railroad between Kalispell and Marion was abandoned in the 1940s. Part of it is now Great Northern Historical Trail.

== Climate ==
This climatic region is typified by large seasonal temperature differences, with warm to hot (and often humid) summers and cold (sometimes severely cold) winters. According to the Köppen Climate Classification system, Marion has a humid continental climate, abbreviated "Dfb" on climate maps.

== Demographics ==
Historical population
Census	Pop.	Note	%±
2010	886		—
2020	1,119		26.3%
U.S. Decennial Census

== Education ==
Marion School District 54 educates students in the area. They are known as the Panthers.

Marion has a public library, a branch of the Flathead County Library.
