= Flathead County, Montana =

County in Montana, United States

- County
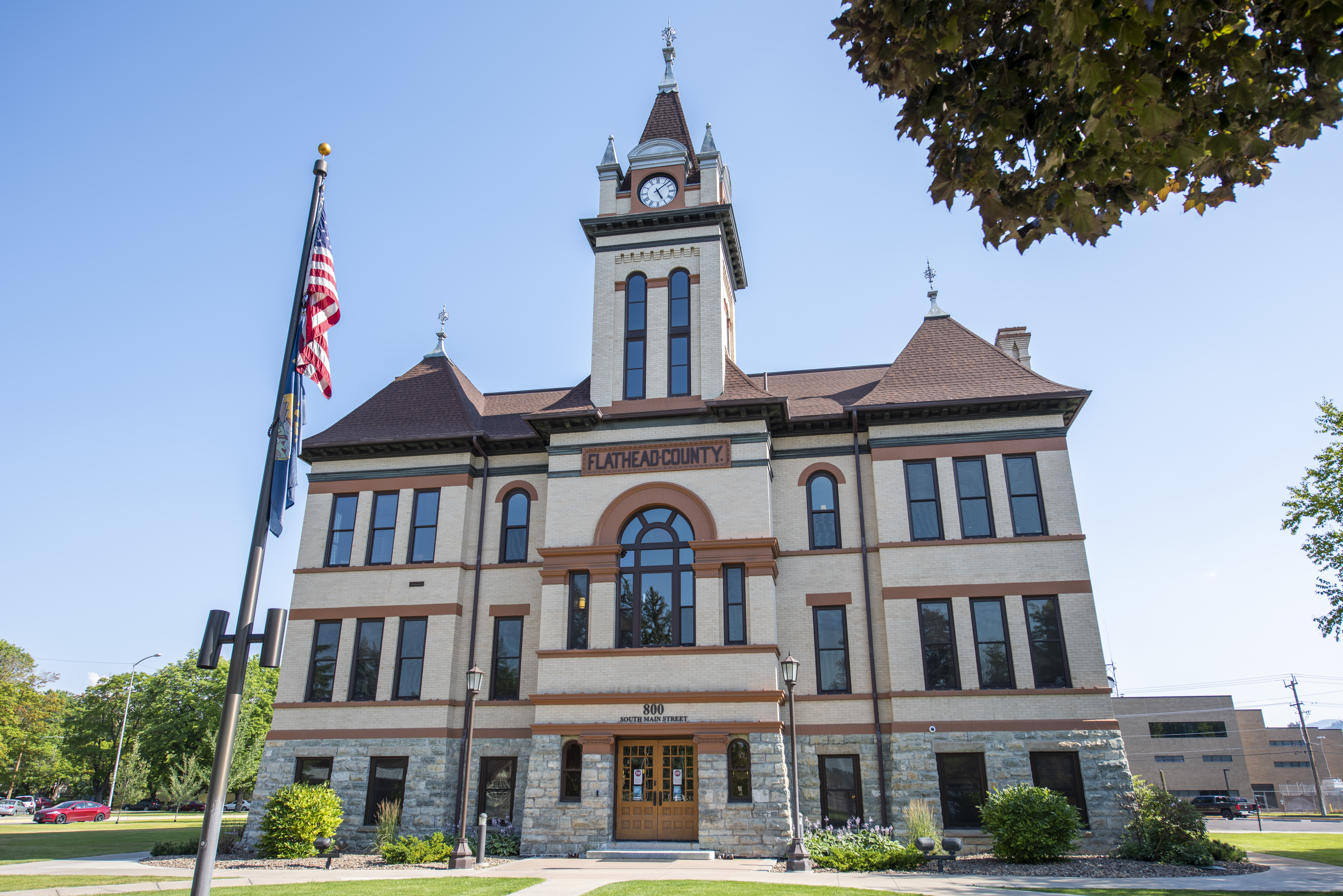
- Flathead County Courthouse in Kalispell

- Seal

- Location within the U.S. state of Montana
- Coordinates: 48°17′N 114°01′W
- Country: United States
- State: Montana
- Founded: 1893
- Named for: Flathead Indians
- Seat: Kalispell
- Largest city: Kalispell

Area
  - Total: 5,256 sq mi (13,610 km^{2})
  - Land: 5,088 sq mi (13,180 km^{2})
  - Water: 169 sq mi (440 km^{2}) 3.2%

Population (2020)
  - Total: 104,357
  - Estimate (2025): 115,429 ▲
  - Density: 20.51/sq mi (7.919/km^{2})
- Time zone: UTC−7 (Mountain)
  - Summer (DST): UTC−6 (MDT)
- Congressional district: 1st
- Website: flatheadcounty.gov
- Montana county number 07

Flathead County is a county located in the U.S. state of Montana. At the 2020 census, its population was 104,357, making it the state's fourth most populous county. Its county seat is Kalispell. Its numerical designation (used in the issuance of license plates) is 7. Its northern border is on the state's north border, making it contiguous with the Canada–US border, facing British Columbia.

Flathead County comprises the Kalispell, Montana Micropolitan Statistical Area, with neighboring Lake County following soon after.

== History ==
Flathead County was founded in 1893. Some sources cite the supposed practice of the Salish tribe flattening infants' heads as the origin of the name Flathead, but there is no record of Salish Indians ever having that appearance.

== Geography ==
The county includes much of Flathead Lake, the Flathead Valley, and the Flathead River. These natural treasures were created by glacial activity which ended approximately 10,000 years ago. The Flathead Valley is the southern extension of a prominent valley called the Rocky Mountain Trench, which runs from the Yukon Territory in Canada as far south as Flathead Lake. The Trench in northwestern Montana was created by subsidence along a major extensional fault, which continues today. After the valley formed, glaciers flowing down the Trench from British Columbia, and into it from the surrounding mountain ranges left a flat valley floor and dammed the Flathead River drainage to create Flathead Lake. Several tribes have long used the Flathead Lake, and the Bitterroot Salish, Kootenai, and Pend d'Oreilles tribes are represented on the Flathead Reservation. The western part of Glacier National Park is located in the county.

According to the United States Census Bureau, the county has a total area of 5,256 square miles (13,610 km^{2}), of which 5,088 square miles (13,180 km^{2}) is land and 169 square miles (440 km^{2}) (3.2%) is water. It is the third-largest county in Montana by land area and second-largest by total area.

=== Ecology ===
Wildlife includes bobcats, black bears, coyotes, deer, elk, grizzly bears, lynx, mountain lions, and wolves.

=== National protected areas ===
- Pacific Northwest National Scenic Trail (part)
- Flathead National Forest (part)
- Glacier National Park (part)
- Kootenai National Forest (part)
- Lolo National Forest (part)
- Lost Trail National Wildlife Refuge

== Demographics ==
Historical population
Census	Pop.	Note	%±
1900	9,375		—
1910	14,079		50.2%
1920	21,705		54.2%
1930	19,200		−11.5%
1940	24,271		26.4%
1950	31,495		29.8%
1960	32,965		4.7%
1970	39,460		19.7%
1980	51,966		31.7%
1990	59,218		14.0%
2000	74,471		25.8%
2010	90,928		22.1%
2020	104,357		14.8%
2025 (est.)	115,429	▲	10.6%
U.S. Decennial Census; 1790–1960 1900–1990; 1990–2000 2010–2020

=== 2020 census ===
As of the 2020 census, the county had a population of 104,357. Of the residents, 21.9% were under the age of 18 and 21.4% were 65 years of age or older; the median age was 42.9 years. For every 100 females there were 99.3 males, and for every 100 females age 18 and over there were 96.9 males. 48.5% of residents lived in urban areas and 51.5% lived in rural areas.

The racial makeup of the county was 90.7% White, 0.3% Black or African American, 0.9% American Indian and Alaska Native, 0.7% Asian, 1.0% from some other race, and 6.4% from two or more races. Hispanic or Latino residents of any race comprised 3.2% of the population.

There were 42,481 households in the county, of which 27.2% had children under the age of 18 living with them and 22.8% had a female householder with no spouse or partner present. About 27.2% of all households were made up of individuals and 12.7% had someone living alone who was 65 years of age or older.

There were 49,875 housing units, of which 14.8% were vacant. Among occupied housing units, 71.7% were owner-occupied and 28.3% were renter-occupied. The homeowner vacancy rate was 1.5% and the rental vacancy rate was 6.6%.

=== 2010 census ===
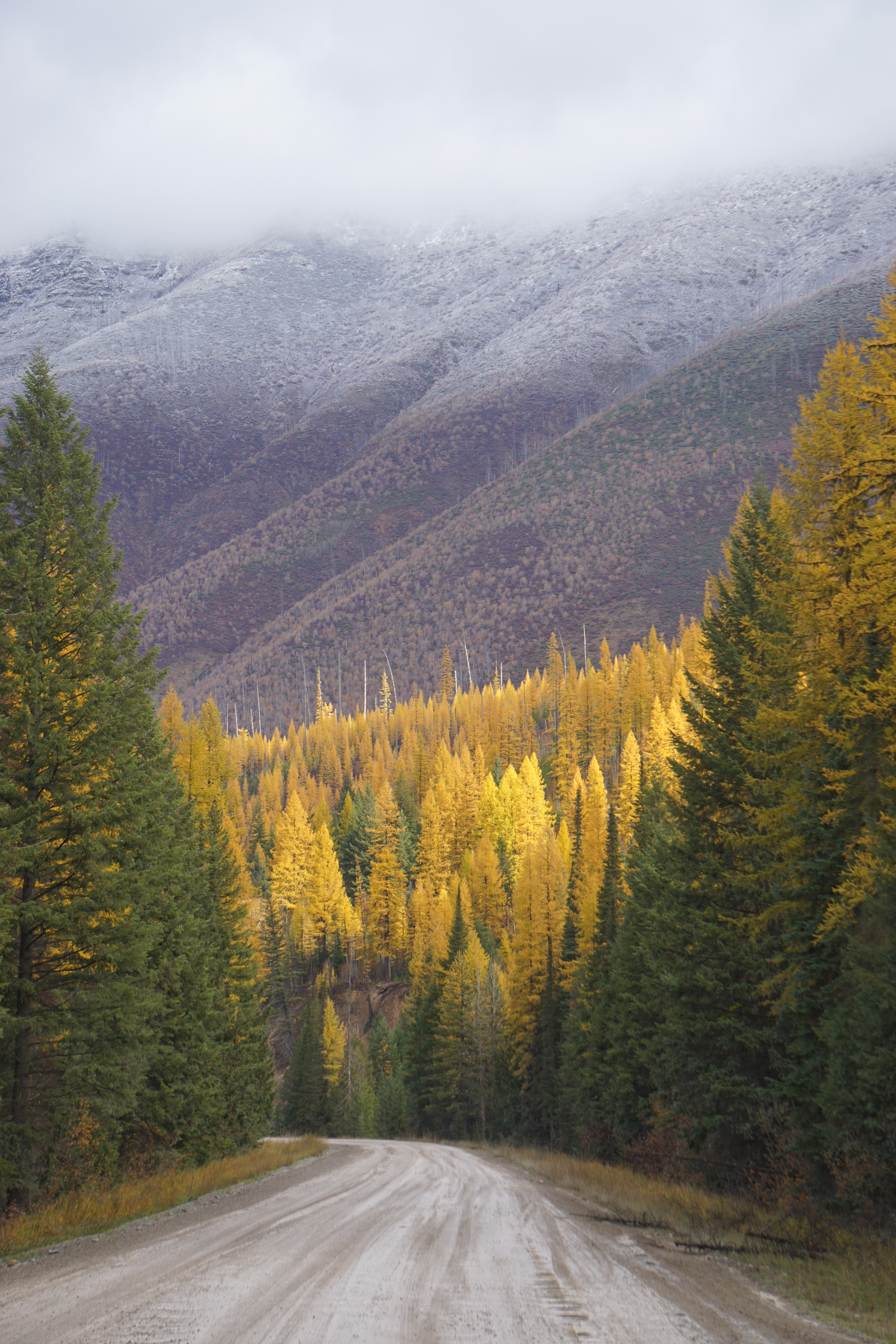
The North Fork Road in Flathead County.

As of the 2010 census, there were 90,928 people, 37,504 households, and 24,817 families living in the county. The population density was 17.9 inhabitants per square mile (6.9/km^{2}). There were 46,963 housing units at an average density of 9.2 per square mile (3.6/km^{2}). The racial makeup of the county was 95.5% white, 1.1% American Indian, 0.6% Asian, 0.2% black or African American, 0.1% Pacific islander, 0.4% from other races, and 2.1% from two or more races. Those of Hispanic or Latino origin made up 2.3% of the population. In terms of ancestry, 28.1% were German, 15.0% were English, 14.8% were Irish, 9.3% were Norwegian, and 4.6% were American.

Of the 37,504 households, 29.5% had children under the age of 18 living with them, 52.8% were married couples living together, 8.7% had a female householder with no husband present, 33.8% were non-families, and 27.2% of all households were made up of individuals. The average household size was 2.40, and the average family size was 2.91. The median age was 41.2 years.

The median income for a household in the county was $44,998, and the median income for a family was $53,940. Males had a median income of $39,767 versus $28,026 for females. The per capita income for the county was $24,721. About 8.4% of families and 11.7% of the population were below the poverty line, including 17.8% of those under age 18 and 7.7% of those age 65 or over.

== Politics ==
Along with Yellowstone County (home to Billings), Flathead County is one of Montana's more populous counties that leans heavily Republican. It has last voted Democratic in 1964, and has voted over 60% Republican in every presidential election since 1996 save 2008.

United States presidential election results for Flathead County, Montana
Year	Republican		Democratic		Third party(ies)	
Year	No.	%	No.	%	No.	%
1896	413	23.22%	1,360	76.45%	6	0.34%
1900	1,104	47.08%	1,201	51.22%	40	1.71%
1904	1,969	64.54%	861	28.22%	221	7.24%
1908	1,838	49.45%	1,480	39.82%	399	10.73%
1912	493	14.93%	1,106	33.50%	1,702	51.56%
1916	2,913	45.33%	2,978	46.34%	535	8.33%
1920	3,900	59.26%	2,241	34.05%	440	6.69%
1924	2,541	43.28%	788	13.42%	2,542	43.30%
1928	4,098	66.61%	1,972	32.05%	82	1.33%
1932	2,978	38.76%	4,026	52.40%	679	8.84%
1936	2,460	28.83%	5,408	63.38%	664	7.78%
1940	4,403	45.06%	5,217	53.39%	151	1.55%
1944	4,066	52.22%	3,608	46.34%	112	1.44%
1948	4,240	46.12%	4,546	49.45%	407	4.43%
1952	7,372	59.09%	4,994	40.03%	110	0.88%
1956	8,088	57.40%	6,003	42.60%	0	0.00%
1960	7,554	52.95%	6,689	46.88%	24	0.17%
1964	6,325	44.02%	8,015	55.78%	30	0.21%
1968	7,215	51.54%	5,253	37.52%	1,532	10.94%
1972	10,417	60.72%	5,412	31.55%	1,327	7.73%
1976	10,494	55.69%	7,827	41.53%	524	2.78%
1980	15,102	63.54%	6,349	26.71%	2,316	9.74%
1984	17,012	65.93%	8,310	32.21%	481	1.86%
1988	14,461	57.33%	10,202	40.44%	562	2.23%
1992	11,699	37.24%	9,746	31.02%	9,971	31.74%
1996	16,542	51.33%	10,452	32.43%	5,231	16.23%
2000	22,519	66.55%	8,329	24.61%	2,991	8.84%
2004	26,019	67.27%	11,587	29.96%	1,072	2.77%
2008	25,559	58.43%	16,138	36.89%	2,047	4.68%
2012	28,309	64.47%	13,892	31.64%	1,708	3.89%
2016	30,240	63.67%	13,293	27.99%	3,963	8.34%
2020	38,321	63.93%	20,274	33.82%	1,343	2.24%
2024	41,390	65.55%	20,062	31.77%	1,689	2.67%

== Infrastructure ==
- Kalispell Regional Medical Center is the county's largest hospital.
- North Valley Hospital is located in Whitefish
- Flathead County Library System has 4 locations:
    - Bigfork
    - Columbia Falls
    - Kalispell
    - Marion
  - Whitefish Library is separate
- Flathead County Solid Waste (Landfill) is located between Kalispell and Whitefish
- There are 16 Fire Districts and 3 Fire Service Areas
- There are 6 High Schools including private
- There are 21 Public School Districts
- Legislature
  - 3 County Commissioner Districts
  - 11 House Districts
  - 7 Senate Districts

== Communities ==
=== Cities ===
- Columbia Falls
- Kalispell (county seat)
- Whitefish

=== Census-designated places ===
- Batavia
- Bigfork
- Coram
- Essex
- Evergreen
- Forest Hill Village
- Helena Flats
- Hungry Horse
- Kila
- Lakeside
- Little Bitterroot Lake
- Marion
- Martin City
- Niarada
- Olney
- Pinnacle
- Polebridge
- Rhodes
- Snowslip
- Somers
- West Glacier

=== Other unincorporated communities ===
- Apgar Village
- Lake McDonald

=== Adjacent counties ===
- Regional District of East Kootenay, British Columbia – north
- Waterton Lakes National Park (Improvement District No. 4), Alberta – northeast
- Glacier County – east
- Pondera County – east
- Teton County – east
- Lewis and Clark County – southeast
- Powell County – southeast
- Missoula County – southeast
- Lake County – south
- Sanders County – southwest
- Lincoln County – west

== Education ==
High school districts include:

- Bigfork High School District
- Columbia Falls High School District
- Flathead High School District
- Whitefish High School District

Elementary school districts include:

- Bigfork Elementary School District
- Cayuse Prairie Elementary School District
- Columbia Falls Elementary School District
- Creston Elementary School District
- Deer Park Elementary School District
- Fair-Mont-Egan Elementary School District
- Evergreen Elementary School District
- Helena Flats Elementary School District
- Kalispell Elementary School District
- Kila Elementary School District
- Marion Elementary School District
- Olney-Bissell Elementary School District
- Pleasant Valley Elementary School District
- Smith Valley Elementary School District
- Somers Elementary School District
- Swan River Elementary School District
- West Glacier Elementary School District
- West Valley Elementary School District
- Whitefish Elementary School District

Flathead Valley Community College is a tertiary institution.

== Notable people ==
- Joe Bereta, member of the sketch comedy duo Barats and Bereta based in Spokane, Washington. Currently co-hosts SourceFed on YouTube.
- Jaime Clarke, novelist and editor
- Frank Hagel, Western art painter
- Phil Jackson, NBA coach and player
- Dorothy M. Johnson, writer of Westerns
- Daniel Parker, wildlife sculptor
- Maury Povich, talk show host known for his TV show Maury
- Keith Regier, Montana state senator
- Alice Ritzman, LPGA golf professional
- Derek Skees, Montana state representative
- Michelle Williams, actress

== In popular culture ==
Miami Herald columnist Dave Barry frequently cites the police blotter of the Flathead Beacon in Flathead County as a source of humorous material. It is written in a spare, surrealist style by local man Micah Drew, following the pattern set by earlier writers Christie Burns and Justin Franz.

== See also ==
- List of lakes in Flathead County, Montana (A-L)
- List of lakes in Flathead County, Montana (M-Z)
- List of mountains in Flathead County, Montana (A-L)
- List of mountains in Flathead County, Montana (M-Z)
- National Register of Historic Places listings in Flathead County, Montana
