= Kootenai River Valley =

The Kootenai River Valley (KRV) is an informal name for a region covering Lincoln County, Montana, United States, and connecting the communities of Eureka, Libby and Troy. It has recently been adopted as an identity for residents and enthusiasts for the region who have come together to create a movement of citizens to promote social and economic development—encouraging people to get involved in making the experience of living, visiting or doing business in Lincoln County an attractive and enjoyable proposition.

The region is named after the Kootenai River.
