= Essex, Montana =

Unincorporated community in Montana, United States

- Census-designated place
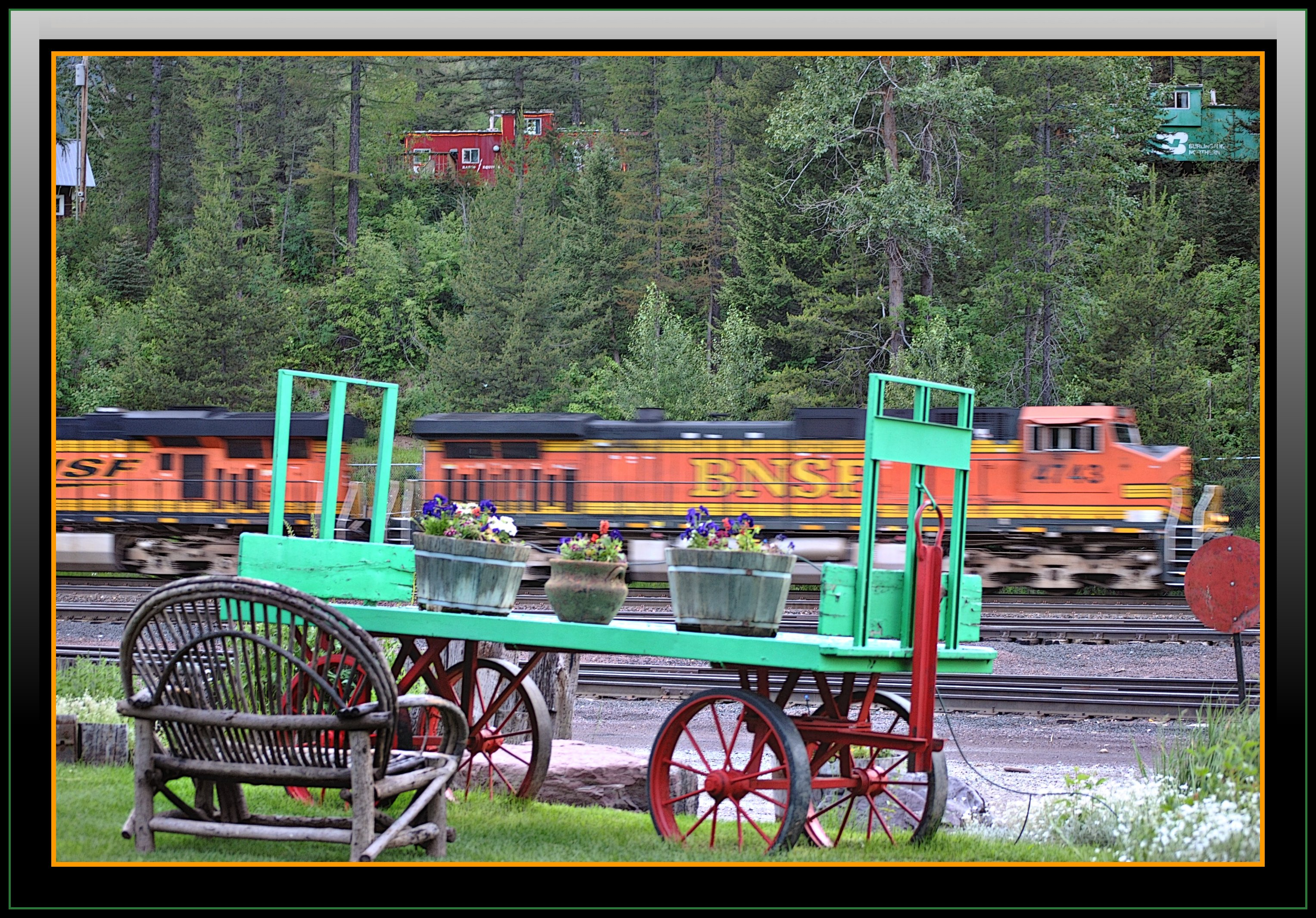
- Train passing through Essex
- Interactive map of Essex, Montana
- Coordinates: 48°16′56″N 113°36′34″W
- Country: United States
- State: Montana
- County: Flathead

Area
  - Total: 0.54 sq mi (1.40 km^{2})
  - Land: 0.52 sq mi (1.34 km^{2})
  - Water: 0.019 sq mi (0.05 km^{2})
- Elevation: 3,875 ft (1,181 m)

Population (2020)
  - Total: 44
  - Density: 85/sq mi (33/km^{2})
- FIPS code: 30-24700
- GNIS feature ID: 2806614

Essex is an unincorporated community and census-designated place in Flathead County, Montana, United States. Named for a county in England, Essex (originally known as Walton) began as a small town on the Great Northern Railway’s main line in 1890. As of the 2020 census, Essex had a population of 44.

Located in the northwestern part of the state, Essex lies along the BNSF's Hi-Line route, near Glacier National Park, 31 miles (50 km) southwest of East Glacier and 26 miles (42 km) southeast of West Glacier. Amtrak's Empire Builder makes a flag stop at Essex station: scheduled westbound at 8:44 pm and eastbound at 8:37 am. Essex is also home to a small BNSF Railway yard. Historically, it was used to replenish coal and water for steam locomotives, and to base helper units used to assist trains over Marias Pass. It is still used to base snow-clearing crews in wintertime.

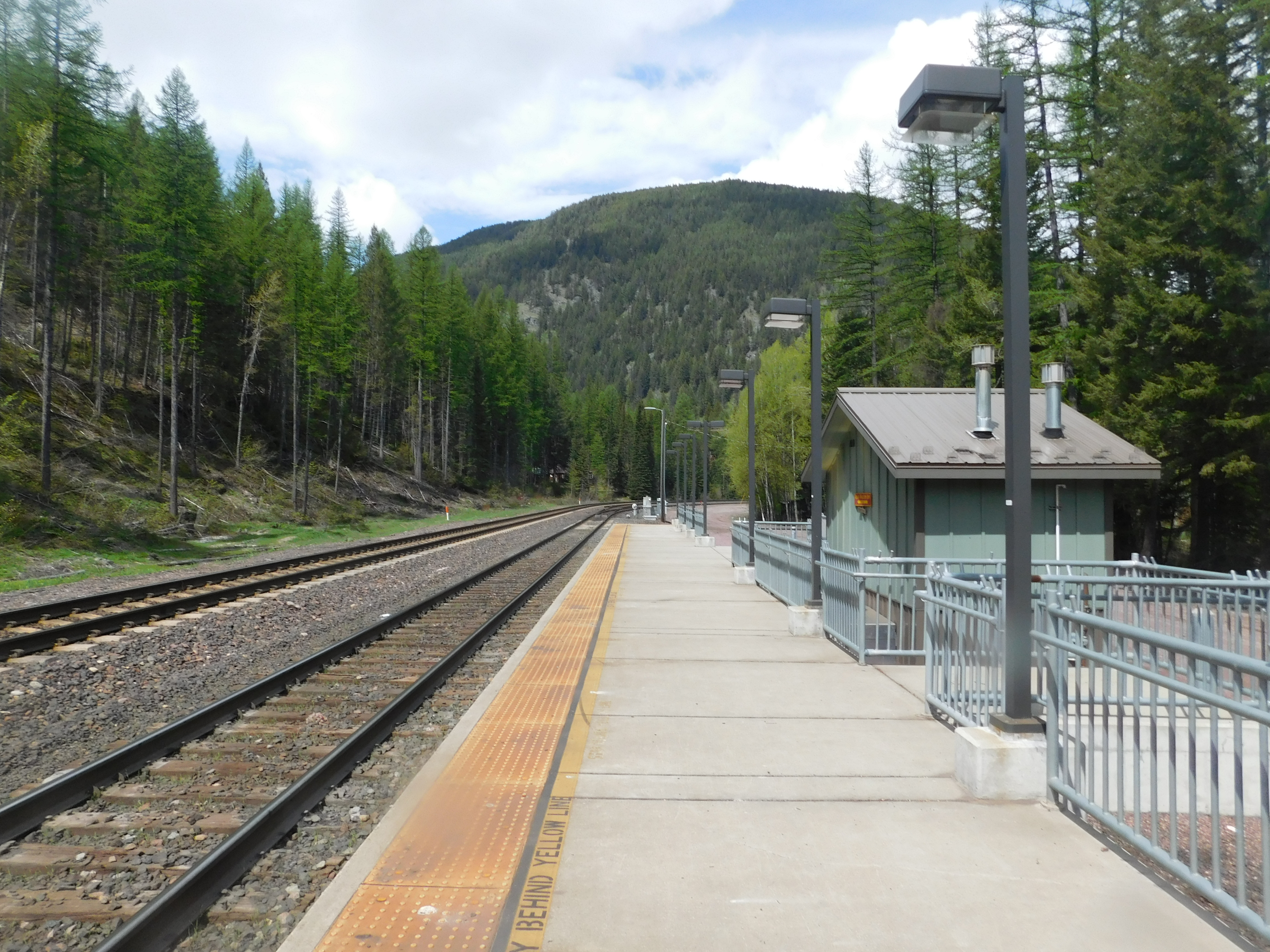
Essex station is served by Amtrak

The Izaak Walton Inn hotel is near the Amtrak station platform, but closed in March 2026 due to the bankruptcy of its parent company (LOGE).

Essex is also home to the Glacier-Waterton hamfest, which claims to be the oldest continually running such amateur radio event in the world, beginning in 1934 and held during the third full weekend in July at an area RV park.

== Demographics ==
Historical population
Census	Pop.	Note	%±
2020	44		—
U.S. Decennial Census
