= Hi-Line (Montana) =

Railway line in Montana

The Hi-Line is a railroad in Montana running between Havre and Whitefish. It serves as a portion of the BNSF Railway Northern Transcon. Originally the mainline of the Great Northern Railway, the Hi-Line name has its origins in the railroad line being the northernmost transcontinental railway line in the United States. While the modern BNSF Railroad has only named this portion the Hi-line, the term is colloquially used for other portions of the Northern Transcon. Hi-Line also more generally refers to the area of northern Montana near the Canada–United States border and U.S. Highway 2.

The route is served by one passenger train daily in each direction operating between Chicago and either Portland, Oregon, or Seattle: Amtrak Empire Builder.

== See also ==
- Hi-Line Railroad Bridge, bridge along a different subdivision of the Northern Transcon.
