= La Crosse Regional Airport =

Airport located in La Crosse, Wisconsin

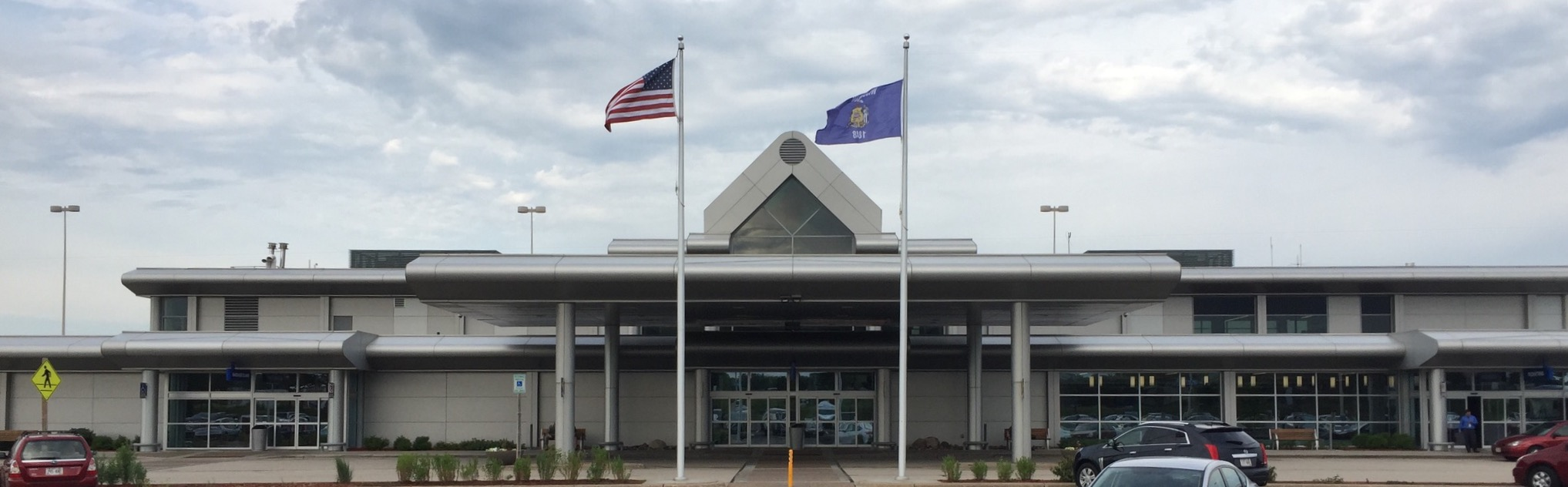
- Terminal building
- IATA: LSE; ICAO: KLSE; FAA LID: LSE; WMO: 72643

Summary
- Airport type: Public
- Owner: City of La Crosse
- Serves: La Crosse, Wisconsin
- Opened: March 1947
- Time zone: CST (UTC−06:00)
  - Summer (DST): CDT (UTC−05:00)
- Elevation AMSL: 655 ft (200 m)
- Coordinates: 43°52′45″N 091°15′24″W
- Public transit access: MTU: 7 (demand-response)
- Website: www.lseairport.com

Maps
- FAA airport diagram

- Location of airport in Wisconsin LSE (the United States)

Runways
| Direction | Length | | Surface |
| Direction | ft | m | Surface |
|---|---|---|---|
| 18/36 | 8,742 | 2,665 | Concrete |
| 13/31 | 6,050 | 1,844 | Asphalt |
| 4/22 | 5,199 | 1,585 | Asphalt |

Statistics (12 months ending August 2026 ^{except where noted})
- Passenger volume: 111,610
- Departing passengers: 56,320
- Scheduled flights: 1,107
- Cargo (lb.): 2,968
- Aircraft operations (2022): 18,143
- Based aircraft (2024): 63
- Source: Federal Aviation Administration

La Crosse Regional Airport (IATA: LSE, ICAO: KLSE, FAA LID: LSE) is a public airport located 5 nautical miles (9.3 km; 5.8 mi) northwest of La Crosse, a city in La Crosse County, Wisconsin, United States. Until August 2013, the airport was called La Crosse Municipal Airport.

It occupies the northern area of French Island, next to the Mississippi River. La Crosse's airport is the closest scheduled airline airport to the U.S. Army Fort McCoy base near Sparta, Wisconsin.

The Federal Aviation Administration (FAA) National Plan of Integrated Airport Systems for 2025–2029 categorized it as a non-hub primary commercial service facility. It is the sixth busiest of eight commercial airports in Wisconsin in terms of passengers served.

== History ==
The La Crosse Municipal Airport was first dedicated as a Class IV airfield on March 1, 1947. Prior, air traffic in La Crosse was hosted at Salzer Field which first opened in 1919 on the city's south side.

The city opened the present day public terminal in 1988. Various hangar and facility expansions and upgrades occurred in the years following.

In 1998 President Bill Clinton flew to La Crosse in AF1 Boeing 707 (VC-137C SAM 26000). This was the last time a US President flew on this plane, which was retired to the National Museum of the United States Air Force in Dayton, Ohio. Other presidents who have flown into La Crosse's airport include Truman, Ford, Bush 43, Clinton, Bush 41, and Obama.

One of the world's largest cargo jets, a Russian Antonov An-124, has flown to La Crosse airport. The US military C-5A cargo and KC-10 Extender cargo/refueling jets have been at the annual summer Deke Slayton Airshow (area astronaut), Airfest at the airport, along with vintage and modern military and private planes. The show has also featured the US Navy Blue Angels and the US Air Force Thunderbirds.

In the past, Sun Country Airlines has flown DC-10 (380 passenger seats) on charter flights from La Crosse to other cities. The New Orleans Saints NFL football team flew the 180-seat Delta Air Lines Boeing 757 planes each week to La Crosse for summer camp, and to and from NFL cities for pre-season games.

The airport's control tower was one of 143 towers slated for closure by the FAA due to the 2013 federal sequester. However, the closures did not occur after Congress restored funding to the FAA.

In 2013 the La Crosse Municipal Airport was renamed and rebranded to La Crosse Regional Airport, in an effort to reflect its broader reach for commercial air access across the region. A multi-year remodel began later that year.

In 2016 the La Crosse Regional Airport completed its $14 million remodel featuring a new security checkpoint, mechanical and electrical systems, a new restaurant and bar, and reconfigured gates on the terminal's upper level. That year 200,000 passengers traveled through the airport.

As of 2026 commercial air at La Crosse Regional Airport is provided by Allegiant Air, American Airlines, and United Airlines. Airport officials are working to return Delta Airlines service which would provide a fourth major carrier.

== Facilities ==
The airport covers 1,380 acres (558 ha) at an elevation of 655.4 feet (199.8 m). It has three runways: the primary runway 18/36 is 8,742 by 150 feet (2,665 m × 46 m) concrete; 13/31 is 6,050 by 150 feet (1,844 m × 46 m) asphalt; 4/22 is 5,199 by 150 feet (1,585 m × 46 m) asphalt.

The original runway layout is still in use, with many improvements. The 8,742-foot paved runway is the fourth longest in Wisconsin, after runways at MKE, MSN, and VOK airfields.

The airport has a modern two-story passenger terminal with three gates. The following are provided:

- Allegiant Air passenger counter
- American Airlines passenger counter and kiosk
- Ground Transportation
  - Avis
  - Bus service
  - Enterprise
  - National / Alamo
- Arrowhead Taphouse and Gifts
- Conference rooms

There are 11 corporate hangars and eight multi-aircraft T-hangars on the airport property. There is a cellphone-use free parking area for those awaiting passenger arrivals.

For the 12-month period ending December 31, 2022, the airport had 18,143 aircraft operations, an average of 50 per day: 70% general aviation, 26% air taxi / airline and 4% military. In August 2024, there were 63 aircraft based at this airport: 49 single-engine, 5 multi-engine, 8 jet and 1 glider.

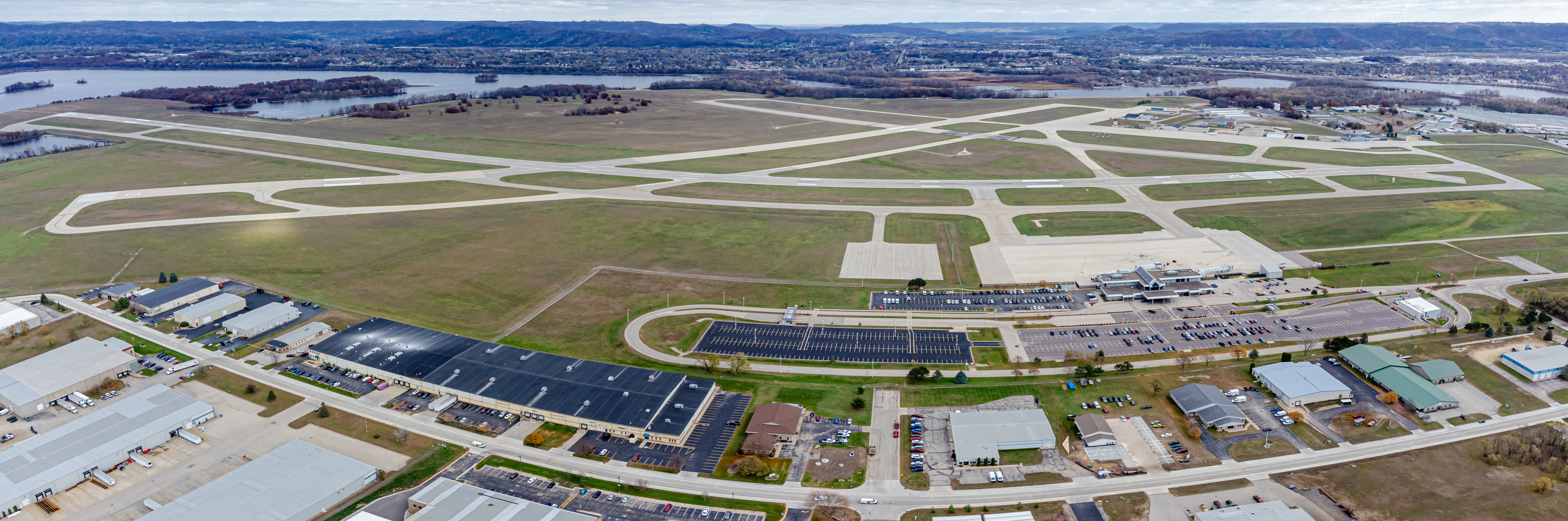
La Crosse airport

== Airlines and destinations ==
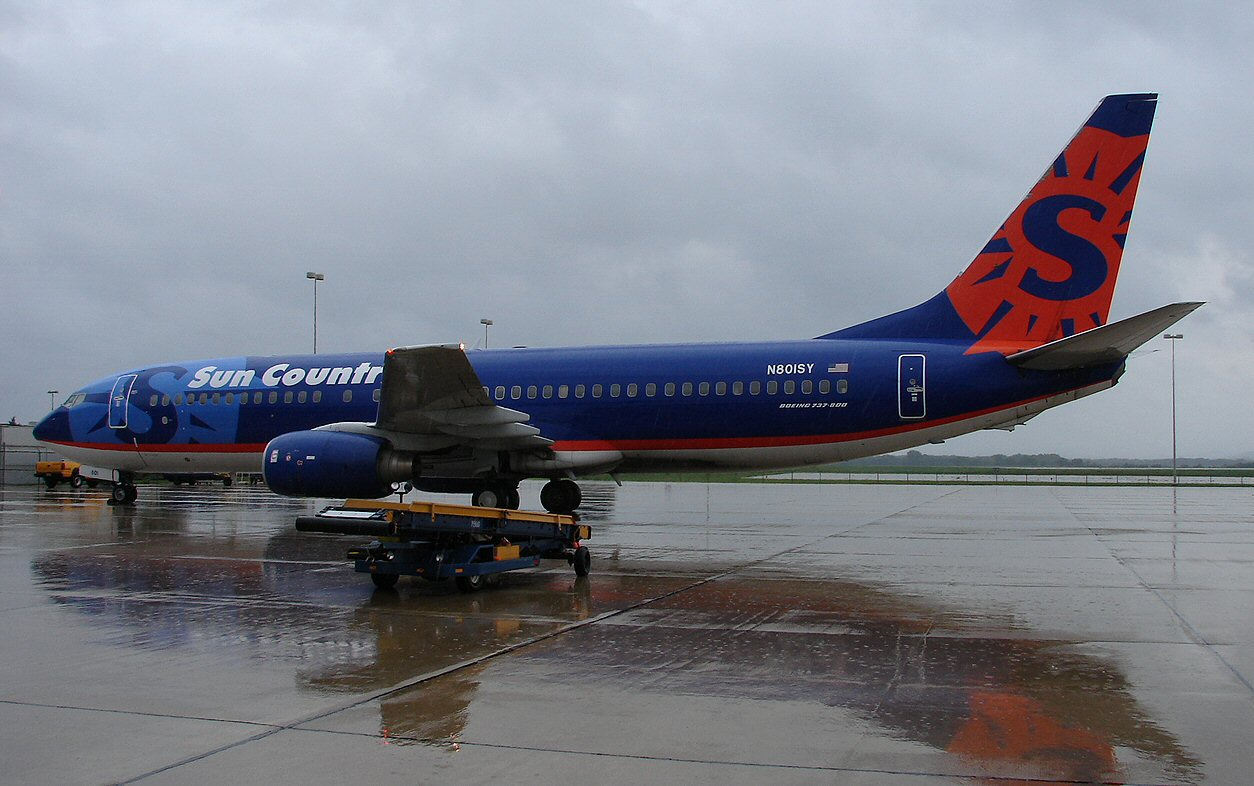
A Sun Country Airlines Boeing 737-800

American Airlines, served by American Eagle, has three daily departures and arrivals with direct service to Chicago. Sun Country Airlines provides periodic Boeing 737 flights to cities such as Bullhead City, Arizona (next to Laughlin, Nevada). Allegiant Air offers seasonal non-stop flights to Phoenix and Orlando. United Airlines, operated by United Express, will begin four daily direct service flights to and from Chicago beginning October 2026.

=== Passenger ===
| Airlines | Destinations |
|---|---|
| Allegiant Air | Orlando/Sanford, Phoenix/Mesa, Punta Gorda (FL) |
| American Eagle | Chicago–O'Hare |

Destinations map
All passenger destinations from La Crosse Regional Airport (LSE)
Red = Year-round destination
Green = Seasonal destination
Blue = Future destination
Purple = Route ending

=== Cargo ===
| Airlines | Destinations |
|---|---|
| UPS Airlines | Minneapolis/St. Paul |

== Statistics ==
=== Number of daily flights ===
| Airline | Airport | Daily flights |
|---|---|---|
| American Eagle | Chicago–O'Hare | 2 - 3 daily |

=== Carrier shares ===
Carrier shares (September 2025 – August 2026)
| Carrier | Passengers (arriving and departing) |
|---|---|
| Envoy | 89,180(79.90%) |
| Allegiant | 22,420(20.09%) |

=== Top destinations ===
Busiest domestic routes out of LSE (September 2025 – August 2026)
| Rank | City | Passengers | Carriers |
|---|---|---|---|
| 1 | Chicago, IL (O’Hare) | 45,190 | American |
| 2 | Phoenix–Mesa, Arizona | 7,430 | Allegiant |
| 3 | Orlando–Sanford, Florida | 3,700 | Allegiant |

== See also ==
- Empire Builder
- La Crosse Municipal Transit Utility
- La Crosse station - Amtrak station in La Crosse
- List of airports in Wisconsin
- TCMC (train)
