= La Crosse Bus Station =

Former intercity bus station in La Crosse, Wisconsin

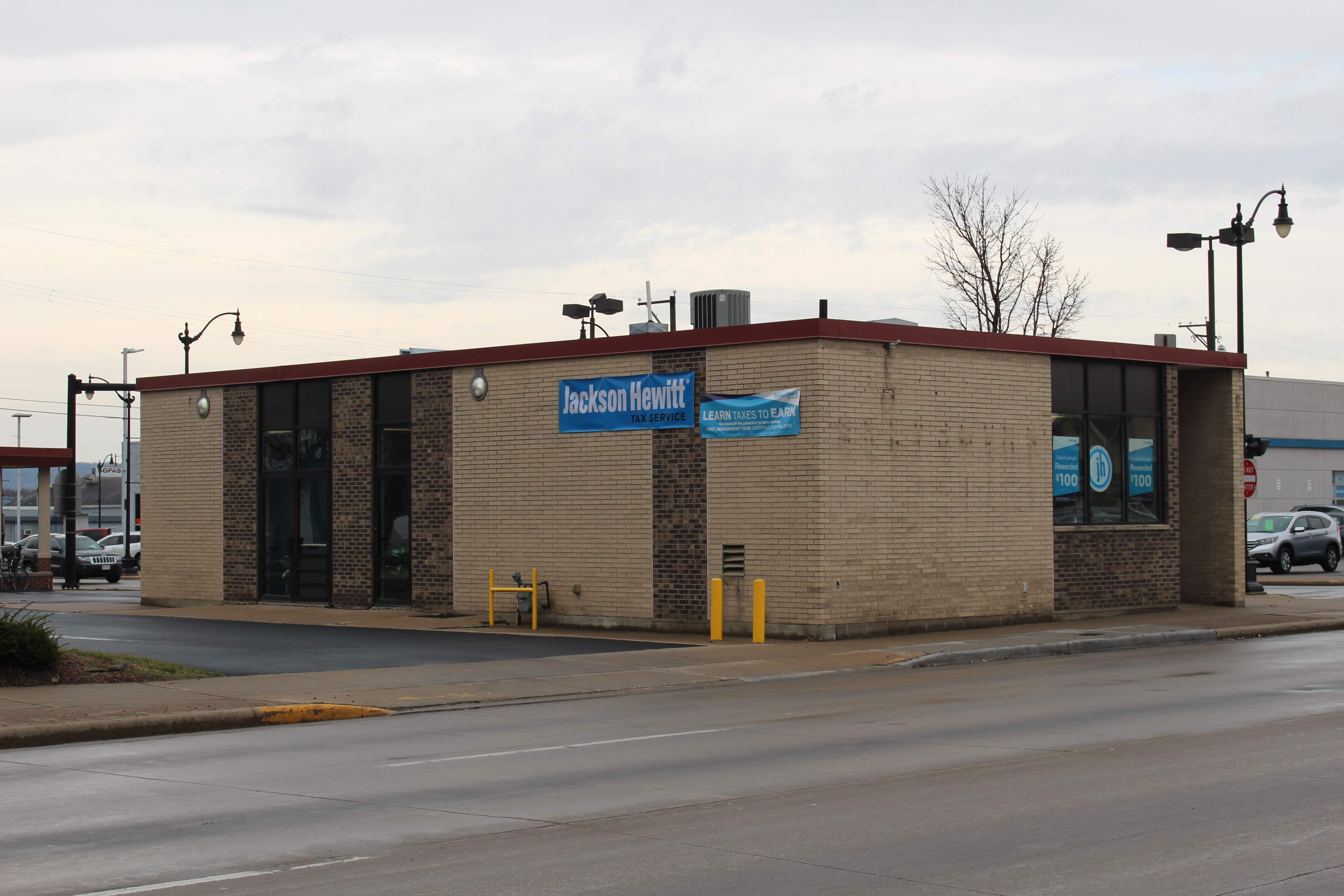
- The former station in 2020

General information
- Location: 600 South 4th Street; La Crosse, Wisconsin
- Coordinates: 43.807590°N 91.252063°W
- Operator: Jefferson Lines
- Bus stands: 4
- Bus operators: Jefferson Lines; Greyhound Lines

Construction
- Architect: Schubert, Sorenson & Associates

Other information
- Website: Official website

History
- Opened: May 1, 1928
- Closed: August 24, 2004
- Rebuilt: December 16, 1957

Passengers
- 50,000/year (1928); 4,000/day (1957); 22/day (2004)
Location

The La Crosse Bus Station was an intercity bus station in the Washburn neighborhood of La Crosse, Wisconsin. The station, last used by Jefferson Lines, was built by Greyhound Lines in 1957.

La Crosse has seen intercity bus transit since at least the early 1920s, when a union bus terminal operated from the Security Bank Building at 4th and State streets. In 1928, a new city-owned Union Bus Depot opened in Market Square at 4th and Jay streets. This was replaced in 1957 with the final dedicated intercity bus station at 4th and Cameron streets.

== Attributes ==
The former bus station is a light brick building, with a heavy emphasis on glass and aluminum, located in the Washburn neighborhood, at the southwest corner of South 4th Street and Cameron Avenue. The station was 2,000 square feet and had space for four to five buses.

== History ==
=== Early stations ===
The first intercity bus station in La Crosse opened in July 1925 within the basement of the Security Bank building at 125 4th Street North. At this time, a variety of small companies operated service to Eau Claire, the Twin Cities, and Madison. Greyhound would purchase these franchises in 1929 beginning a long history of service to the city.

By August 1926, the La Crosse & Southeastern Railroad Company, which had begun bus service in April, proposed a $25,000 union bus depot to be located at Market Square. This site, at the southeast corner of 4th and Jay streets, had been set aside three years prior specifically to become a bus station. Although only a year old, the 1925 station was considered inadequate and unsanitary.

Despite this, no further progress was made until March 1928, by which point there were over 50,000 bus passengers a year. In April, a resolution was passed to repurpose a city employment office to the union bus station. This new location became official in early May, with new bus services being provided quickly thereafter. Over the ensuing years, services were expanded to destinations including Waterloo, Mason City, and Canton.

=== Final dedicated station ===
By the 1950s, Northland Greyhound Lines was searching for a new station location, as the Market Square location became overcrowded. The need for a new location was further compounded by the desire of the city to construct a parking ramp at Market Square. In late 1956, Greyhound purchased a home at 602 South 4th Street. The local station manager justified the location by stating that the center of downtown was moving south.

Demolition of the home began in December, with an expected station opening of April 31, 1957. This would prove to be optimistic, with excavation not beginning until the following August. The $70,000 stone and brick station was designed by Schubert, Sorenson & Associates. The 2,000 square foot station would provide ample space with a ticket desk, food dispensing service, convenience stand and the ability to accommodate four or five buses at once.

The dedication of the new station took place on December 16, 1957 with the first bus leaving for Madison at 7:00 A.M. Dedication ceremonies included organ music, souvenirs, and speeches from local elected officials. While Greyhound was the primary operator with 10 daily schedules, five additional lines would also serve the station including two Scenic Hawkeye Stages schedules and two La Crosse & Western Stages schedules. At the time of opening, approximately 4,000 passengers used the station daily. By 1981, there were 12 daily routes from the station.

=== Current station ===
On August 17, 2004, after 75 years, Greyhound ended service to La Crosse. By this time, there were only four daily departures with an average of 22 passengers. One of the two Greyhound schedules through La Crosse was picked up by Jefferson Lines, however, neither the second schedule or the station was included in the transfer. On August 25, Jefferson Lines buses began using the Amtrak station. This would last until the opening of the Grand River Station local transit center in August 2010. As of 2026, Jefferson Lines and Lamers Bus Lines operate from Grand River Station with an additional bus stop located at the University of Wisconsin La Crosse.

== See also ==
- La Crosse Municipal Transit Utility
