= Valley View Mall =

Valley View Mall may refer to the following shopping facilities:

- Valley View Mall (Roanoke, Virginia) in Roanoke, Virginia
- Valley View Mall (La Crosse, Wisconsin) in La Crosse, Wisconsin
- Valley View Center at Dallas Midtown in Dallas, Texas
