= Frederick C. Finkle =

American consulting engineer and geologist

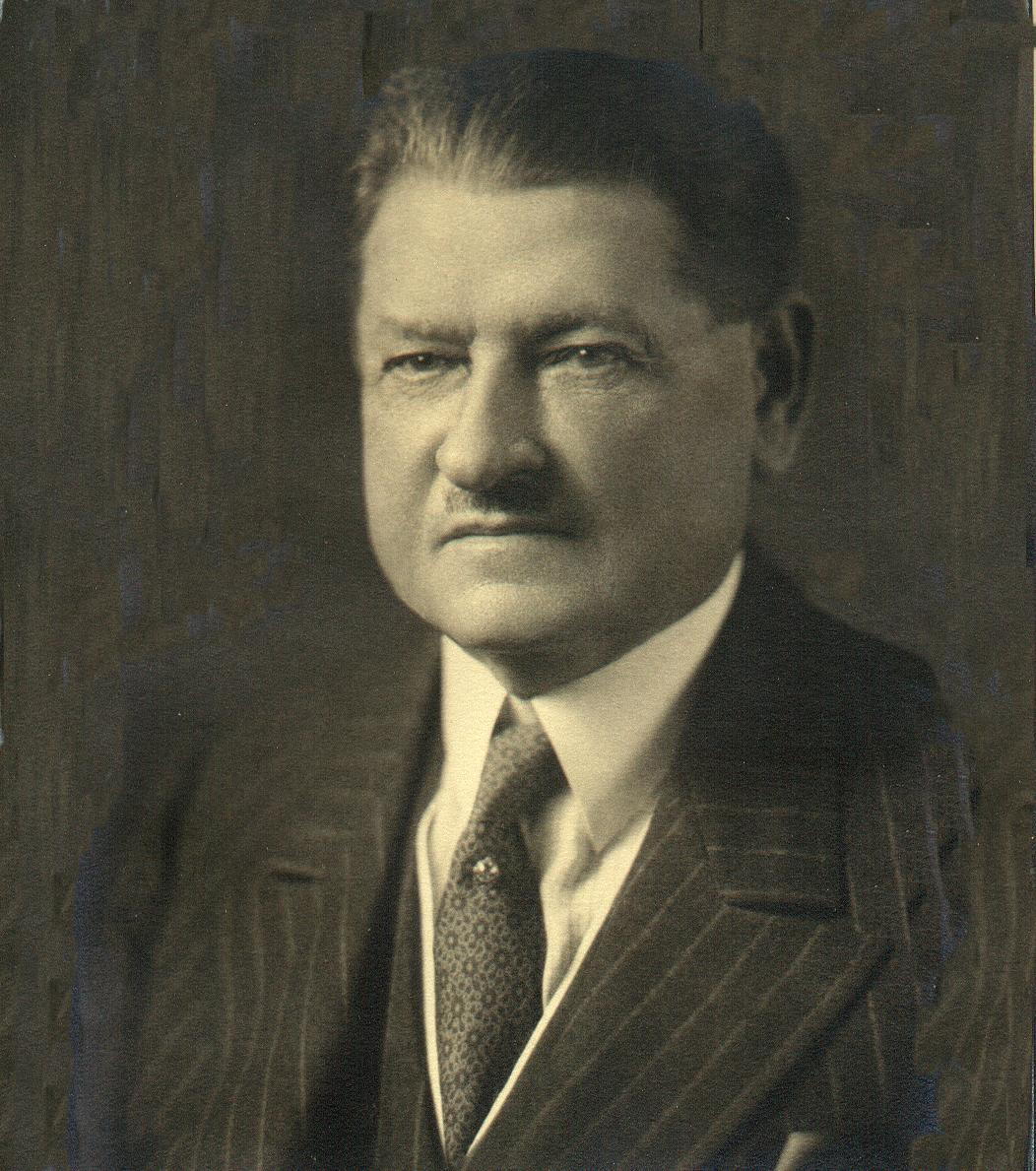
Frederick C. Finkle (1940)

Frederick C. Finkle (May 3, 1865 – April 7, 1949) was an American consulting engineer and geologist. He was Chief Engineer or Consulting Engineer on eighteen major dams to impound water for domestic use, power and irrigation in California and other Western States.

== Background ==
Frederick C. Finkle was born in Viroqua, Wisconsin. He was the son of Thurston (born Torstein Finkelsen) and Sophie Amalie (born Michelet) Finkle. His father and grandparents emigrated to the United States in 1850 from Vestre Slidre Municipality in Christians amt (county) in Norway. His mother's family also emigrated in 1850 from Lillehammer, Norway. His mother’s family had emigrated from Metz, France to Norway in the 17th century.

Frederick Cecil Finkle (baptized as Frederick Christian Finkle) was educated at the district grammar schools and high school of Westby, and Viroqua, Wisconsin. He graduated from the University of Wisconsin in 1887, where he majored in hydraulics and geology. He could speak, write and read eight languages including English, French, German, Spanish, Italian, Danish, Swedish and Norwegian. He also had a thorough knowledge of classical Latin and Greek.

== Career ==
F. C. Finkle (1895)

=== Early years ===
He began his career in California as a hydraulic engineer and geologist in January, 1887. Between 1887 and 1914, He served as:

- Chief Engineer of North Riverside Land & Water Co., 1887 to 1890, in San Bernardino and Riverside Counties, Calif.
- City Engineer of San Bernardino, Calif., 1890 to 1892
- Chief Engineer of water resources and sanitation for California State Public Institutions, 1894 to 1895
- Chief Engineer of Redlands Electric Light & Power Co., 1895 to 1896
- Chief Engineer of Southern California Power Co., and California Power Co., 1896 to 1901
- Chief Hydraulic Engineer and Geologist for Southern California Edison Co., Ltd., 1901 to 1908
- Consulting Engineer and Geologist for Southern California Edison Co., Ltd., 1908 to 1914, during which years he was also Consulting Engineer and Geologist for The Central Colorado Power Co., and Denver Union Water Co. of Denver, Colorado; Mount Hood Railway and Power Co. of Portland, Oregon; Arrowhead Lake Co. of San Bernardino, California.

=== Private practice ===
Starting in 1914 he was in private practice as a consulting engineer and geologist, during which time he served as consulting engineer for many cities, among them, Denver Union Water Co., before the City of Denver acquired its properties; and consulting engineer for the cities of San Bernardino, San Diego, Glendale, Burbank, Beverly Hills, Ontario and others in the State of California. He had charge of flood protection works on the Colorado River, after the great flood and overflow in 1922. He was consulting engineer for the Imperial Valley Irrigation Project for three years.

He was considered an expert in hydraulic engineering and historical and structural geology, and one of the highest authorities on the market value of water rights for power and irrigation in the Western States. He held the world’s record for expert testimony on hydraulics and geology, having testified for 121 days in court during 1927-28 in the trial of the water rights case of Rancho Santa Margarita vs. Vail Co., et al., in San Diego County, California. He reported on the defects in design and construction of the St. Francis Dam for Los Angeles, and predicted its failure four years before it failed with property loss of $20,000,000 and loss of 631 lives. He also reported on the defects of Mulholland Dam in Hollywood, which was reconstructed to make it safe by strengthening the down slope, and lowering the spillway.

During his long professional career, he reported against political schemes which were not for public benefit. This resulted in attacks upon him by politicians, against all of which he successfully defended and completely vindicated himself.

In 1927-28, when the "Forks Dam" project was proposed on San Gabriel River by Los Angeles County, but condemned by him as impracticable, which was later demonstrated as so after wasting $5,000,000 on the project, he was employed as expert in a suit whereby most of the money was recovered for the taxpayers, and was presented with an engraved resolution of commendation by the Harbor District Chambers of Commerce.

Politicians in Orange County, California, published a libelous attack on him when he reported against the location they proposed for the Prado Dam on Santa Ana River. He brought suit against the signer of the libelous letter, in which suit, case No. 26483 in Orange County. He was vindicated by securing judgment for both actual and exemplary damages with costs. This happened in 1929-30. Later, the U. S. Army Engineers sustained him by rejecting the location he had condemned and constructing the Prado Dam where he had suggested.

During 1941, he gave a 49-day deposition in ease No. 764-RJ-Civil, in the U. S. District Court, Southern District of California, Central Division, as an expert on the values of water rights sold by the Nevada—California Electric Corp. to the City of Los Angeles, which involved capital gains tax on profit from the sale. Because his testimony showed that the government appraiser was not qualified and his figures were erroneous, this agent secured a secret indictment from the Grand Jury charging perjury. This indictment was nullified by the 1942 Federal Grand Jury upon his appearance before it, and the U. S. Attorney General directed the dismissal of the whole matter in 1942.

He contributed articles to some of the "Water Supply and Irrigation Papers" published by the United States Geological Survey, and to the National Irrigation Congress, Engineering Magazine and Engineering News-Record. He was a vigorous and vocal opponent of Prohibition who wrote to President Hoover urging him to support modifying the restrictive liquor laws that he believed were adversely affecting the vitality and economic life of the nation.

== Civic affiliations ==
- President of the Southwest Chamber of Commerce, later Southside Chamber of Commerce (1924 to 1925)
- Member of the Los Angeles Rapid Transit Commission 1925 to 1926)
- Vice President of the Harbor District Chambers of Commerce (1928 to 1931) and its President during the year 1941
- Member of the American Society of Mechanical Engineers, American Association of Engineers, American Water Works Association, and a life member of the American Institute of Electrical Engineers

== Personal life ==
He was married in 1889 to Louisa Thoma Beckstead. He had two children by this marriage, William and Roy. Later he married Priscilla Ann Jones in 1901. There was one child from this union, Frederick, Jr. In 1924, he married Henrietta Catherine Billette. They adopted a daughter Yvette Catherine. At the time of his death, he resided in Beverly Hills, California and was survived by his wife Henrietta.

== Other sources ==
- Biographical Encyclopedia of the World (1948), pages 135-6
- Who's Who in America (1948–49), page 797

== Related reading ==
- Mulholland, Catherine William Mulholland and the Rise of Los Angeles (University of California Press, 2002)
