= Lawrence Grimsrud =

American politician

Lawrence Grimsrud (November 10, 1871 – December 28, 1956) was an American lawyer and politician.

Born in Lower Coon Valley, Vernon County, Wisconsin, Grimsrud worked on the family farm. He went to the Breckinridge Institute in Decorah, Iowa. Grimsrud then received his bachelor's degree from St. Olaf College. He then studied law at Drake University, then at a law office in La Crosse, Wisconsin, and was admitted to the Wisconsin bar in 1901. Grimsrud lived briefly in Minot, North Dakota and then practiced law in Westby, Wisconsin. Grimsrud served on the Westby village board, as president of the village, and as village attorney. In 1911 and 1913, Grimsrud served in the Wisconsin State Assembly and was a Republican. In 1918, Grimsrud moved to Viroqua, Wisconsin. Grimsrud died in Viroqua, Wisconsin and was buried at Viroqua Cemetery in Vernon County, Wisconsin.
