= Westby, Wisconsin =

- City
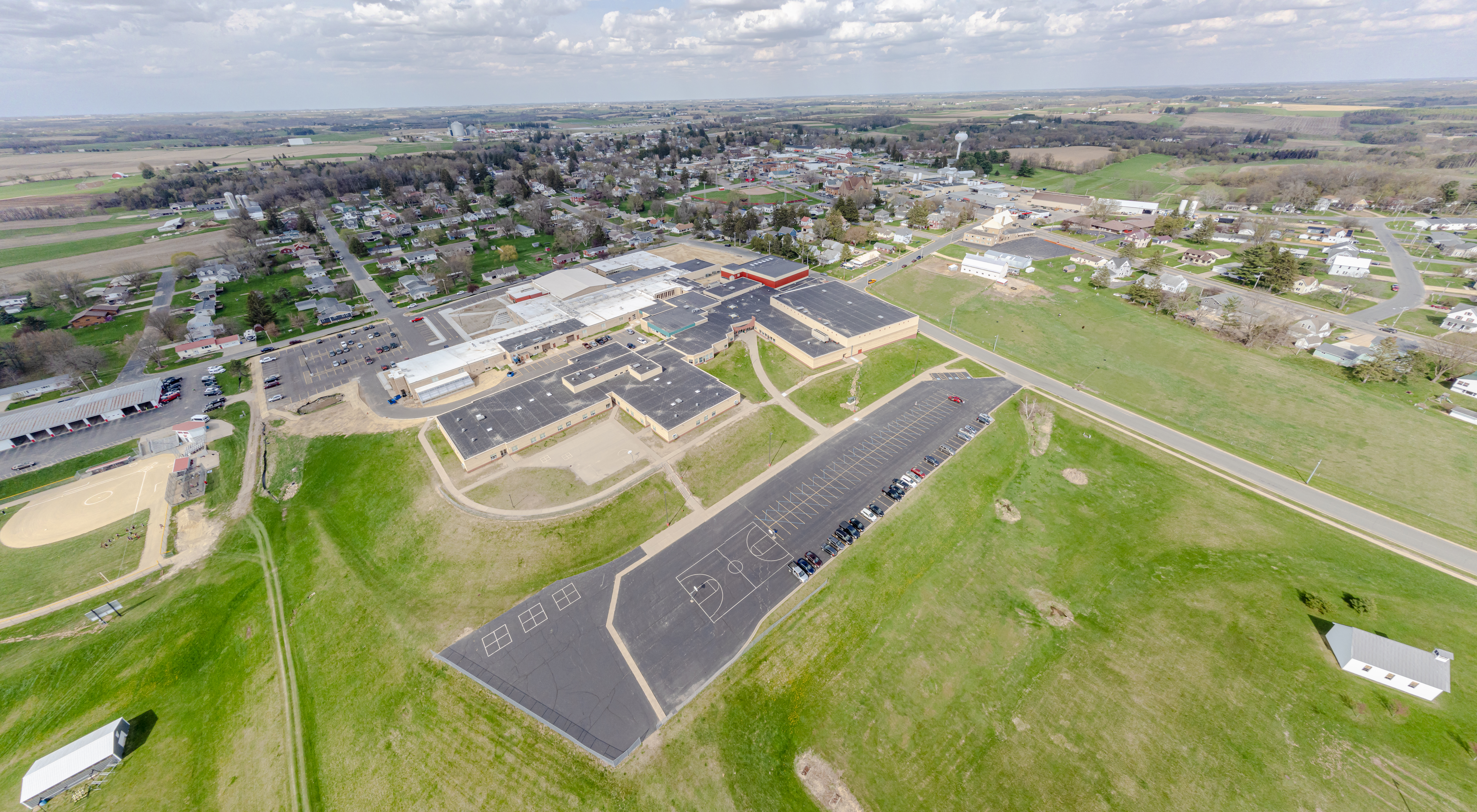
- Skyline of Westby
- Nickname: Co-op City
- Location of Westby in Vernon County, Wisconsin.

- Location within Wisconsin Location within the United States
- Coordinates: 43°39′14″N 90°51′33″W
- Country: United States
- State: Wisconsin
- County: Vernon
- Incorporated: 1896

Area
  - Total: 2.69 sq mi (6.98 km^{2})
  - Land: 2.69 sq mi (6.96 km^{2})
  - Water: 0.0077 sq mi (0.02 km^{2})
- Elevation: 1,299 ft (396 m)

Population (2020)
  - Total: 2,332
  - Density: 868.2/sq mi (335.2/km^{2})
- Time zone: UTC-6 (Central (CST))
  - Summer (DST): UTC-5 (CDT)
- ZIP code: 54667
- Area code: 608
- FIPS code: 55-85475
- GNIS feature ID: 1576571
- Website: www.cityofwestby.org

Westby is a city in Vernon County, Wisconsin, United States. The population was 2,332 as of the 2020 census. The name "Westby" is a Norwegian name and literally translates to "Western city".

== History ==
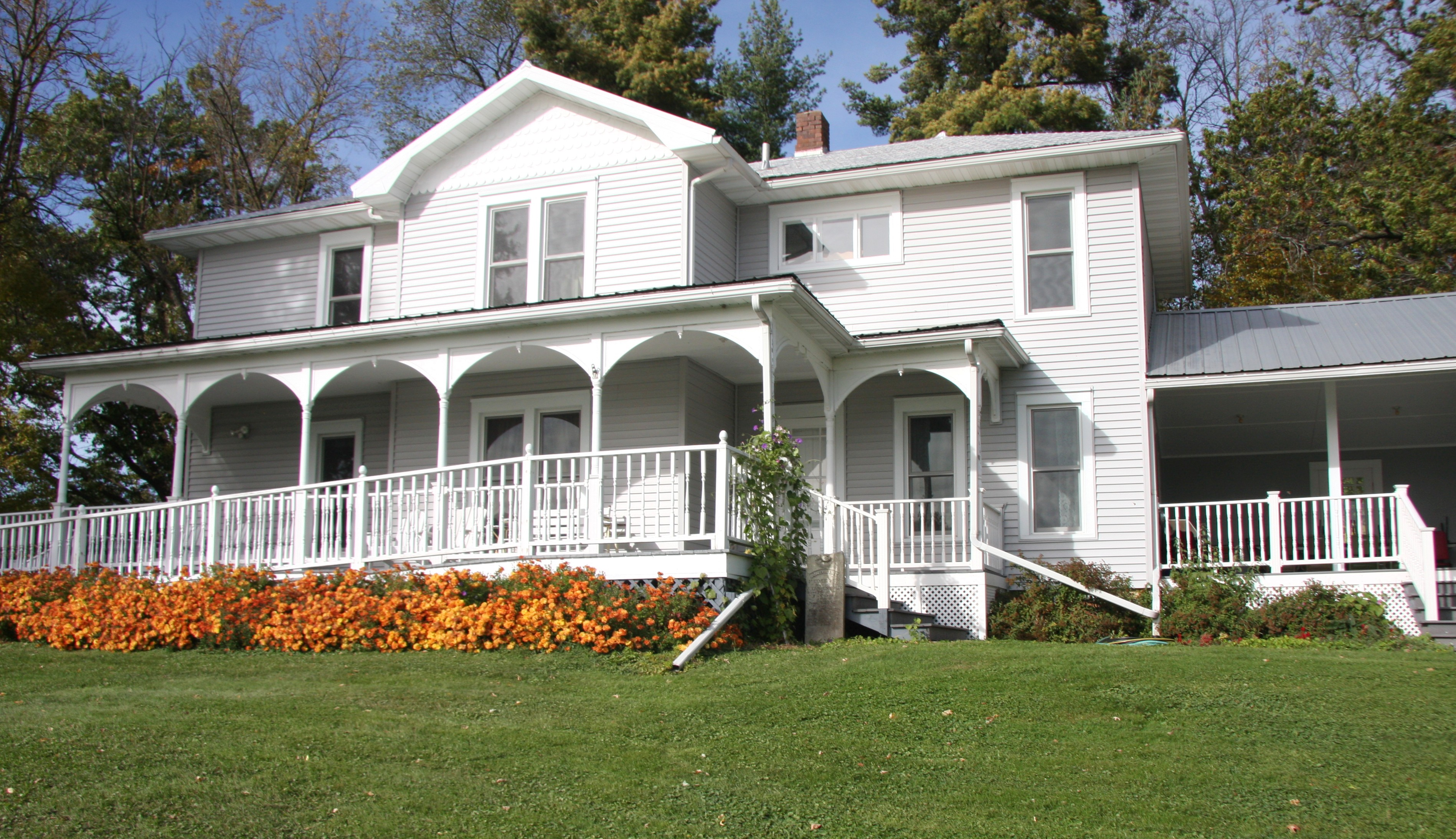
The Thoreson Museum, home of the Westby Area Historical Society

Westby was named after general store owner and Civil War Union soldier Ole T. Westby of Biri, Norway, where many of the city's Norwegian-American settlers originated. Westby Coon-Prairie Lutheran Church in Westby was established in 1851. The Chicago, Milwaukee, St. Paul and Pacific Railroad began servicing Westby and surrounding townships in August 1879, and the La Crosse and Southeastern Railroad began service to the area in January 1905, though both railroads have long since ceased local operations. The Westby depot was torn down in 1970.

== Geography ==
Westby is located at 43°39′14″N 90°51′33″W (43.653861, −90.859034), at the headwaters of the Bad Axe River.

According to the United States Census Bureau, the city has a total area of 2.60 square miles (6.73 km^{2}), of which 2.59 square miles (6.71 km^{2}) is land and 0.01 square miles (0.03 km^{2}) is water.

== Demographics ==
Historical population
Census	Pop.	Note	%±
1900	524		—
1910	902		72.1%
1920	1,228		36.1%
1930	1,366		11.2%
1940	1,438		5.3%
1950	1,491		3.7%
1960	1,544		3.6%
1970	1,568		1.6%
1980	1,797		14.6%
1990	1,866		3.8%
2000	2,045		9.6%
2010	2,200		7.6%
2020	2,332		6.0%
U.S. Decennial Census

=== 2020 census ===
As of the census of 2020, the population was 2,332. The population density was 868.2 inhabitants per square mile (335.2/km^{2}). There were 1,033 housing units at an average density of 384.6 per square mile (148.5/km^{2}). The racial makeup of the city was 95.2% White, 0.6% Asian, 0.2% Black or African American, 0.1% Pacific Islander, 0.3% from other races, and 3.6% from two or more races. Ethnically, the population was 1.9% Hispanic or Latino of any race.

=== 2010 census ===
As of the census of 2010, there were 2,200 people, 929 households, and 575 families living in the city. The population density was 849.4 inhabitants per square mile (328.0/km^{2}). There were 996 housing units at an average density of 384.6 per square mile (148.5/km^{2}). The racial makeup of the city was 98.0% White, 0.2% African American, 0.1% Native American, 0.1% Asian, 0.4% from other races, and 1.0% from two or more races. Hispanic or Latino of any race were 1.0% of the population.

There were 929 households, of which 29.5% had children under the age of 18 living with them, 48.9% were married couples living together, 9.3% had a female householder with no husband present, 3.8% had a male householder with no wife present, and 38.1% were non-families. 33.6% of all households were made up of individuals, and 15% had someone living alone who was 65 years of age or older. The average household size was 2.30 and the average family size was 2.93.

The median age in the city was 41.5 years. 24.8% of residents were under the age of 18; 5.9% were between the ages of 18 and 24; 24.1% were from 25 to 44; 24.4% were from 45 to 64; and 20.8% were 65 years of age or older. The gender makeup of the city was 48.1% male and 51.9% female.

=== 2000 census ===
As of the census of 2000, there were 2,045 people, 840 households, and 554 families living in the city. The population density was 841.9 people per square mile (324.9/km^{2}). There were 906 housing units at an average density of 373.0 per square mile (144.0/km^{2}). The racial makeup of the city was 99.12% White (mostly Norwegian-American), 0.24% Native American, 0.10% Asian, 0.49% from other races, and 0.05% from two or more races. Hispanic or Latino of any race were 0.93% of the population.

There were 840 households, out of which 31.4% had children under the age of 18 living with them, 54.4% were married couples living together, 8.5% had a female householder with no husband present, and 34.0% were non-families. 30.5% of all households were made up of individuals, and 16.1% had someone living alone who was 65 years of age or older. The average household size was 2.34 and the average family size was 2.92.

In the city, the population was spread out, with 25.0% under the age of 18, 6.4% from 18 to 24, 27.7% from 25 to 44, 19.0% from 45 to 64, and 21.9% who were 65 years of age or older. The median age was 39 years. For every 100 females, there were 85.1 males. For every 100 females age 18 and over, there were 81.4 males.

The median income for a household in the city was $32,340, and the median income for a family was $41,000. Males had a median income of $29,274 versus $21,429 for females. The per capita income for the city was $16,839. About 4.9% of families and 7.5% of the population were below the poverty line, including 7.6% of those under age 18 and 9.7% of those age 65 or over.

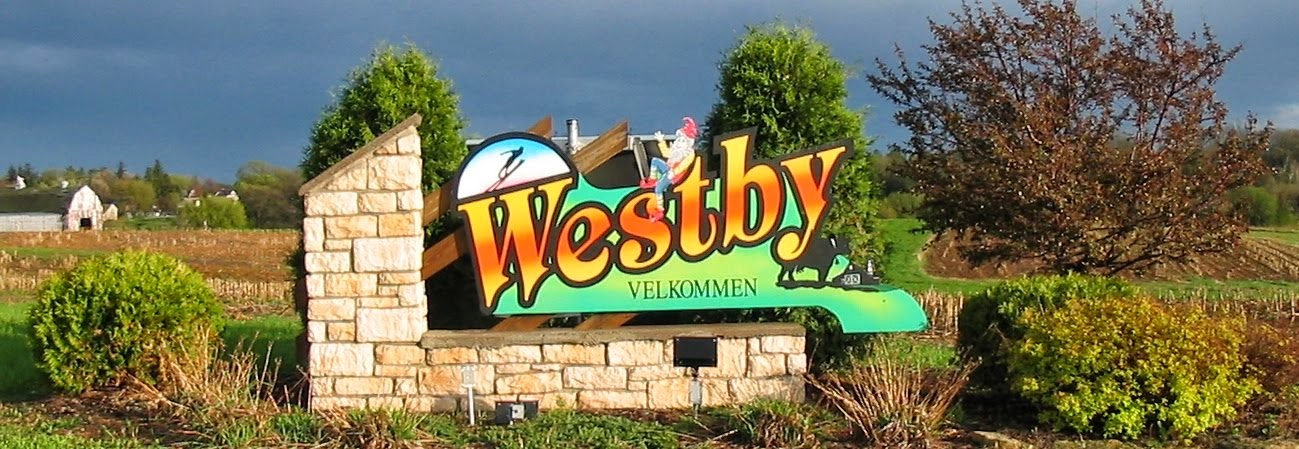
Westby city limits

== Economy ==
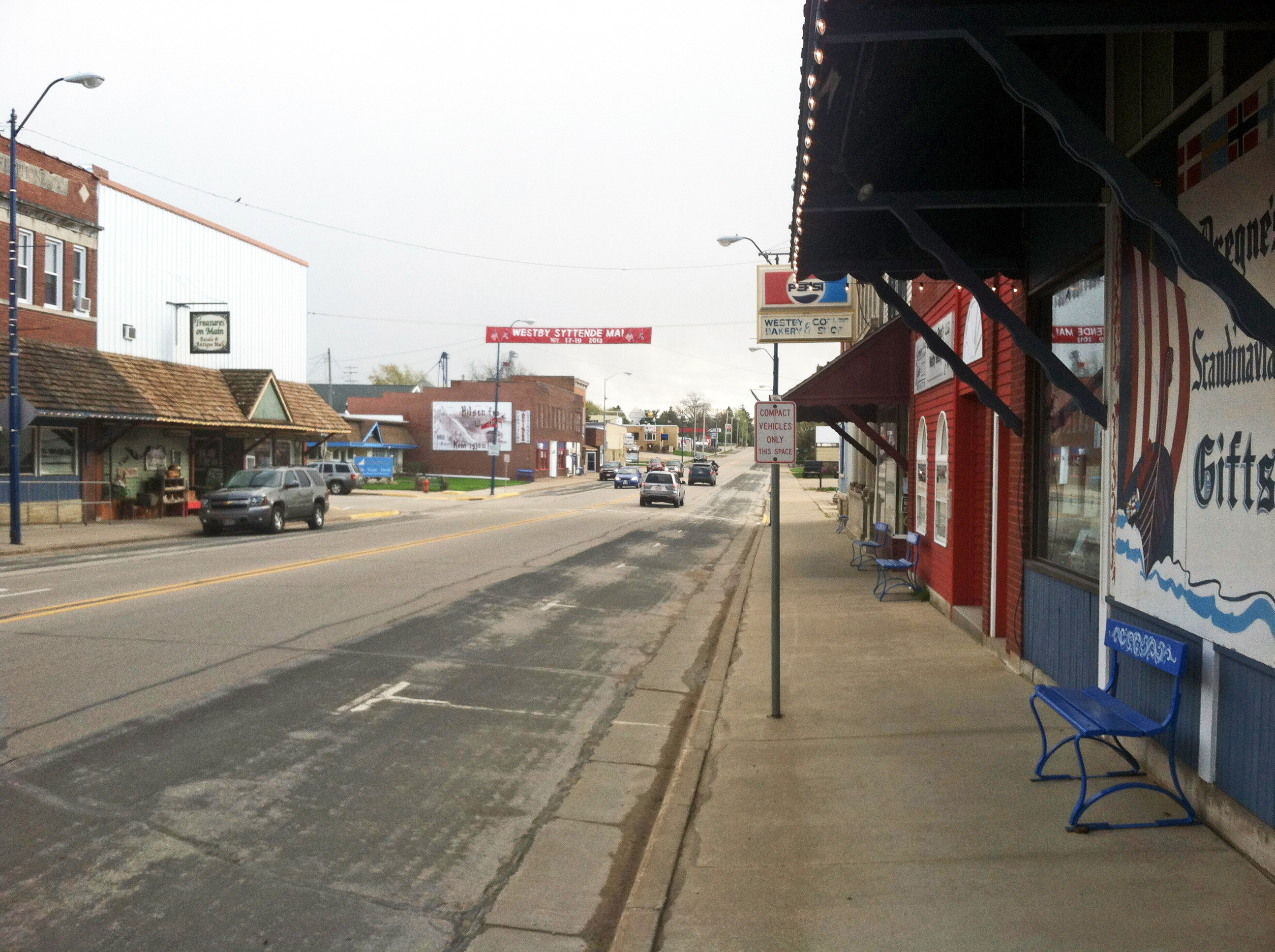
Downtown Westby

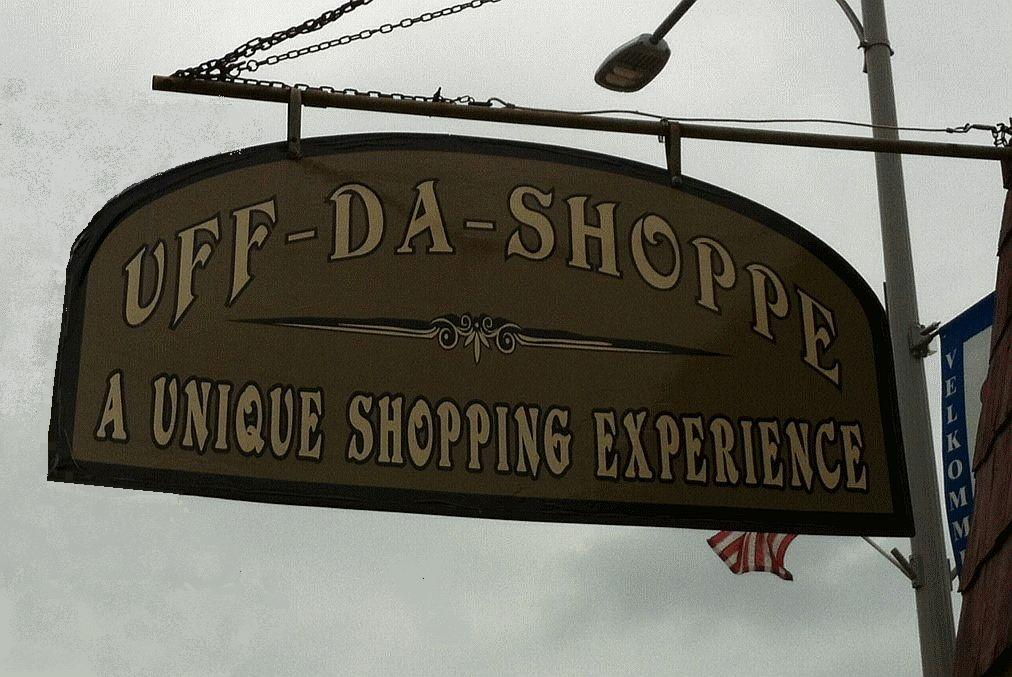
Uff da Shoppe, downtown

The local economy was built on agriculture, with a strong tradition of cooperative businesses. With seven cooperatives still functioning, Westby has been referred to as "Co-op City". some of the more prominent co-ops are the Westby Cooperative Creamery, Vernon Telephone Cooperative, Heartland Country Coop, Westby Coop Credit Union, and Vernon Electric Cooperative. Another important local business, also based on agriculture and is also a Co-op, is Accelerated Genetics, formerly Tri-State Breeders. It produces cattle semen for artificial insemination. Tobacco was formerly an important crop, Vernon County tobacco being used for the outer wrapper for cigars, with 120 employed in the tobacco warehouse in the 1930s.

Westby is served by a weekly newspaper, the Westby Times. The Norwegian flavor of the town is captured in the name of a store, Uff Da Shoppe.

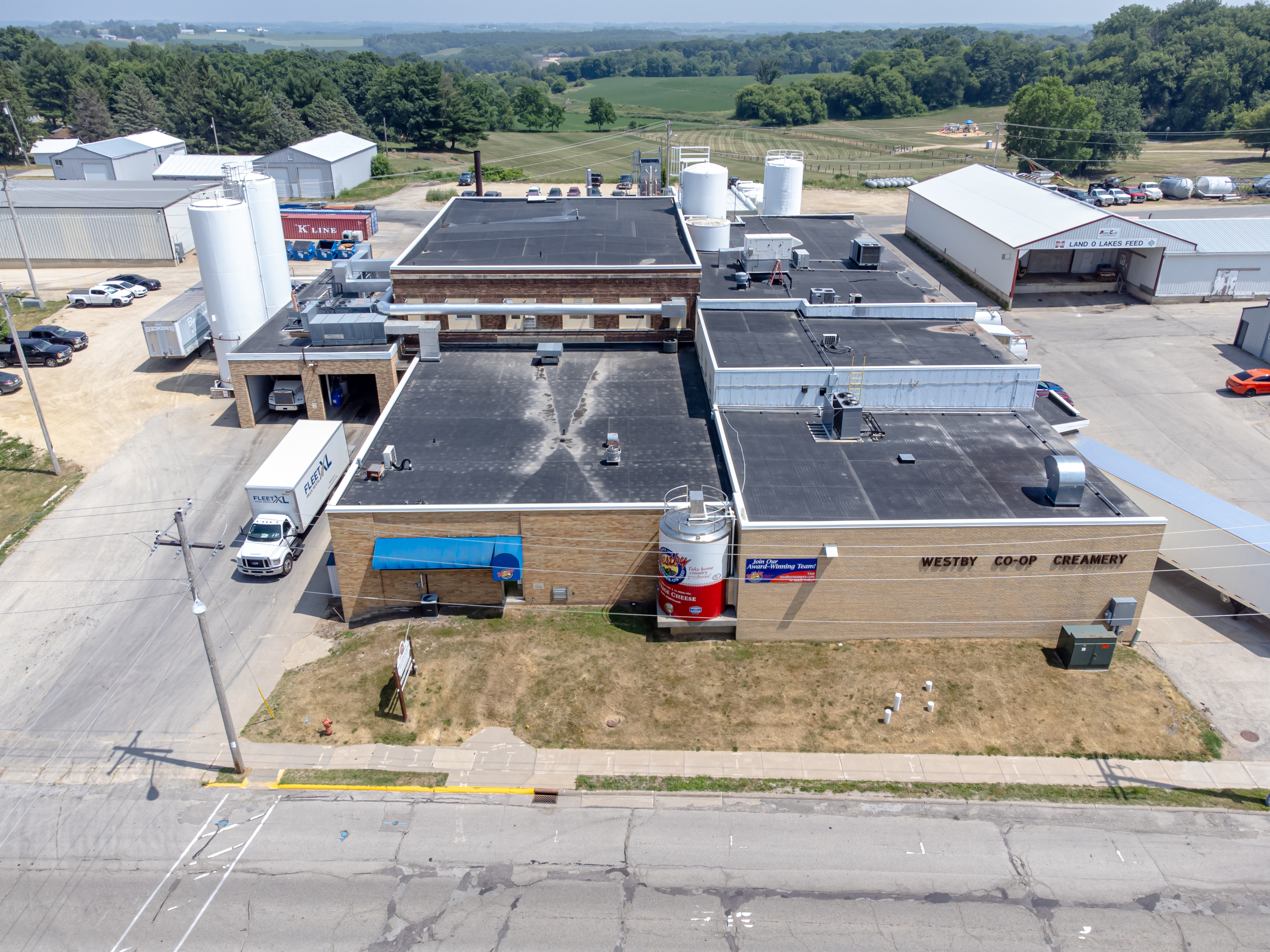
Westby Cooperative Creamery

== Transportation ==
Bus service towards La Crosse or Viroqua is provided seven times daily per direction by Scenic Mississippi Regional Transit.

== Festivals ==
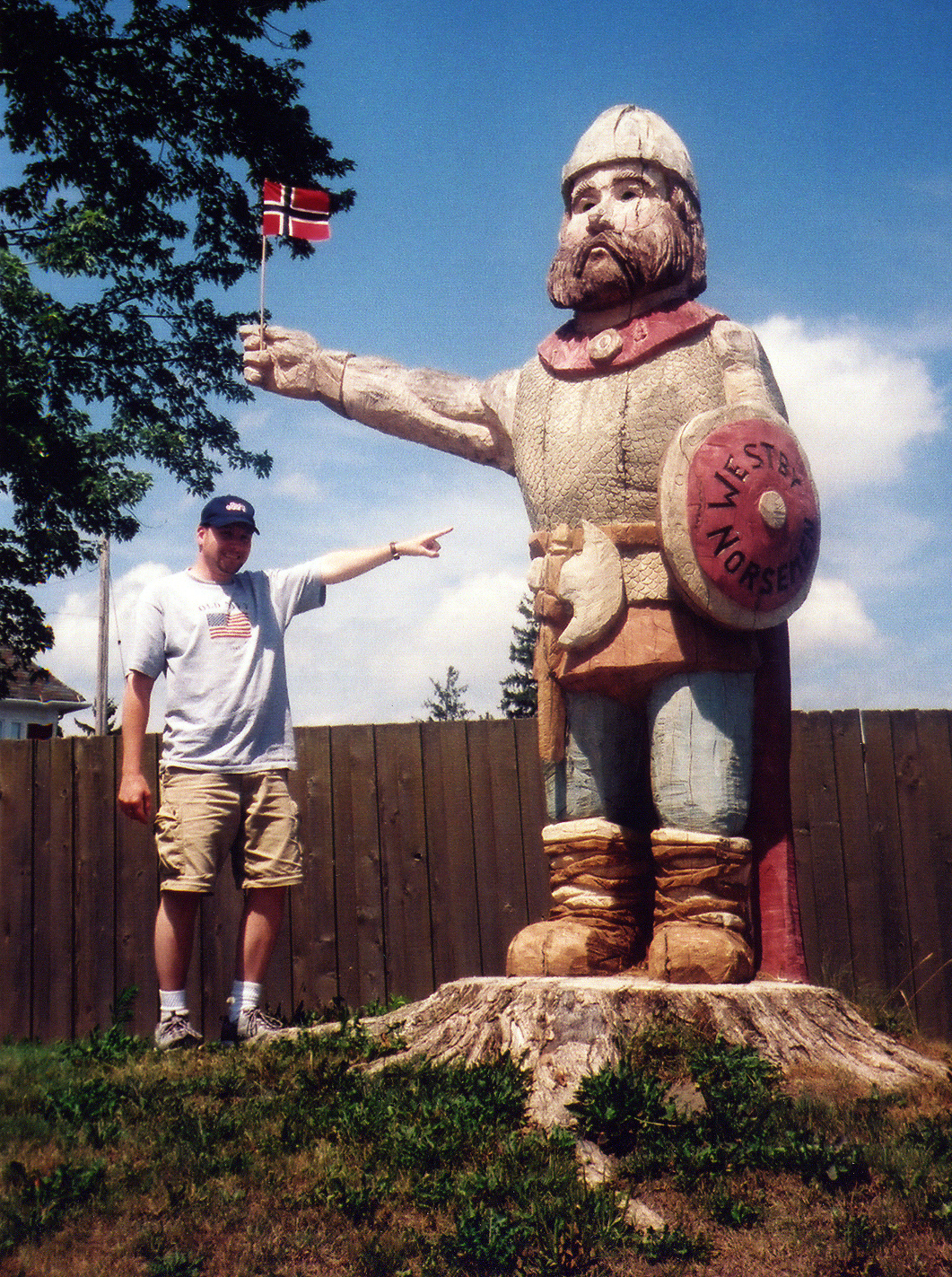
The Westby Norseman

Westby has one of the largest ski jumping hills in the United States. The Snowflake Ski Club hosts an annual ski jump event at the end of January and the beginning of February. The event includes a parade to introduce all of the participating countries, a competition for "Snowflake" royalty, and opportunities for local businesses to sell their wares. The event attracts competitors from all over the ski jumping world.

Westby's most popular event is the Syttende Mai festival, an annual three-day event held in mid-May. The festival stems from Westby's Norwegian roots, Syttende Mai being a Norwegian holiday ("Syttende Mai" translates to "Seventeenth of May") celebrating Norway's independence and the signing of the Norwegian Constitution.

The festival's main attractions are the cultural shops, where many Norwegian products are sold; the food stands; and the troll hunt. At the start of the weekend, a small troll, standing several inches tall, is hidden somewhere within the city limits. A clue is posted downtown on each of the three days until someone finds the troll. The prize for retrieving the troll is $50.

In recent years, Westby has held a town festival to mark Leif Erikson Day.

== Gallery ==
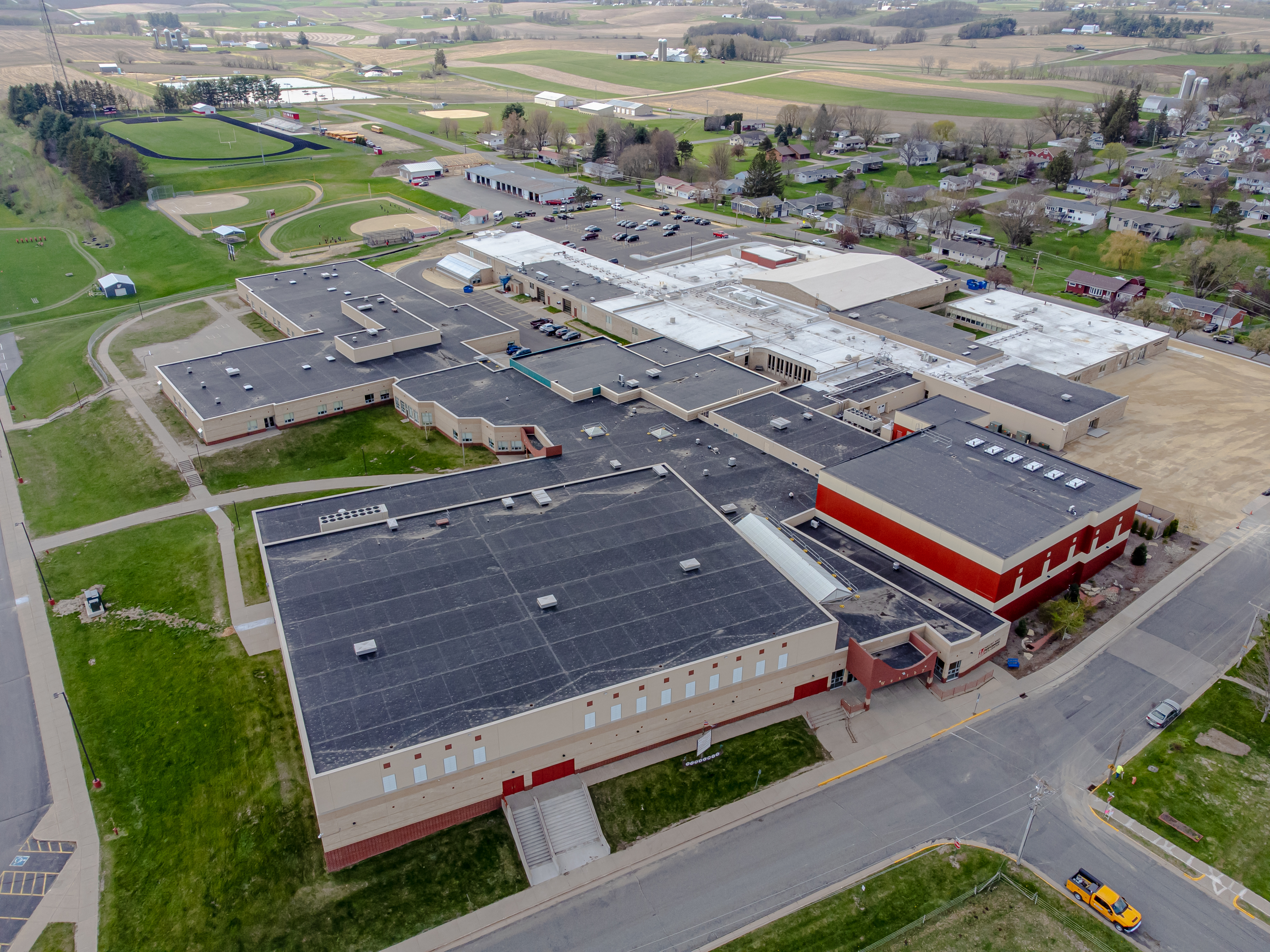
Westby High School

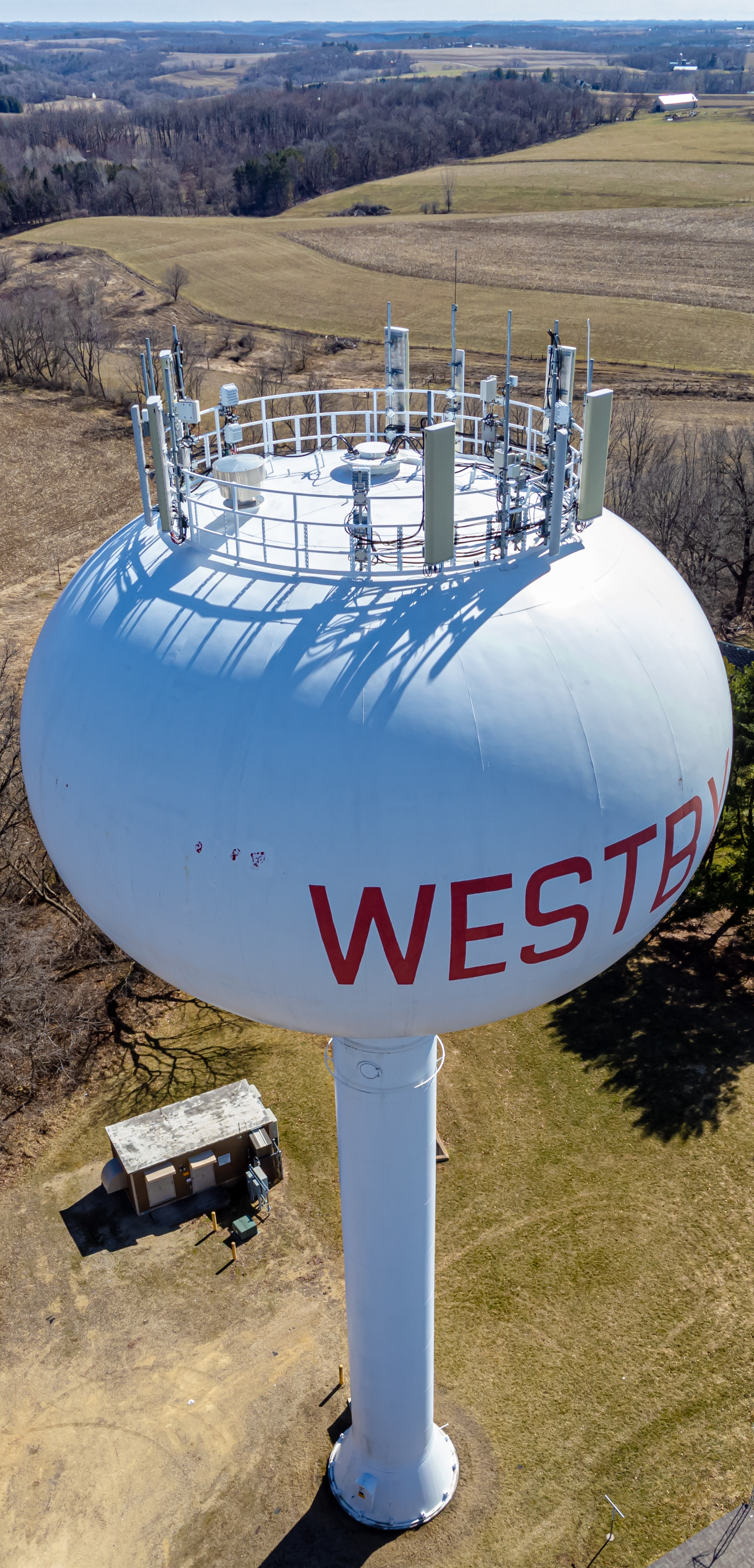
Water tower

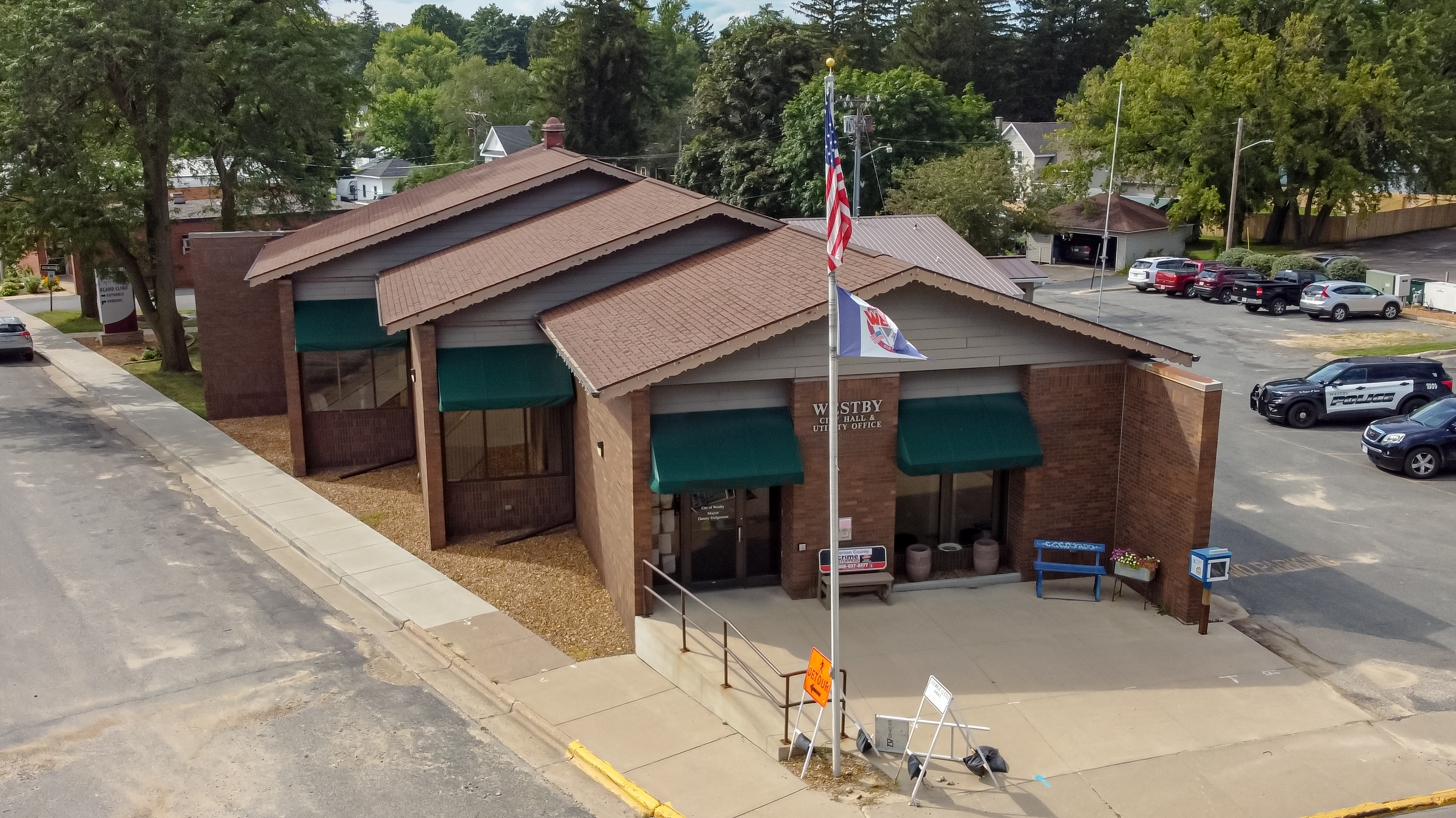
Westby City Hall

== Notable people ==
- Dexter Bean, NASCAR driver
- Andrew H. Dahl, Wisconsin State Representative
- Lawrence Grimsrud, Wisconsin State Representative
- Hjalmer S. Halvorsen, Wisconsin State Representative
- Ludwig Hektoen, physician and pathologist
- Nils Joseph Hong, educator
- Dedrick Martin Langve, Wisconsin State Representative
- Arthur O. Mockrud, Wisconsin State Assembly
- Lee Nerison, Wisconsin State Representative
- Freddie Slack, bandleader, composer
