= Valley View Mall (Wisconsin) =

Shopping mall in La Crosse, Wisconsin U.S.

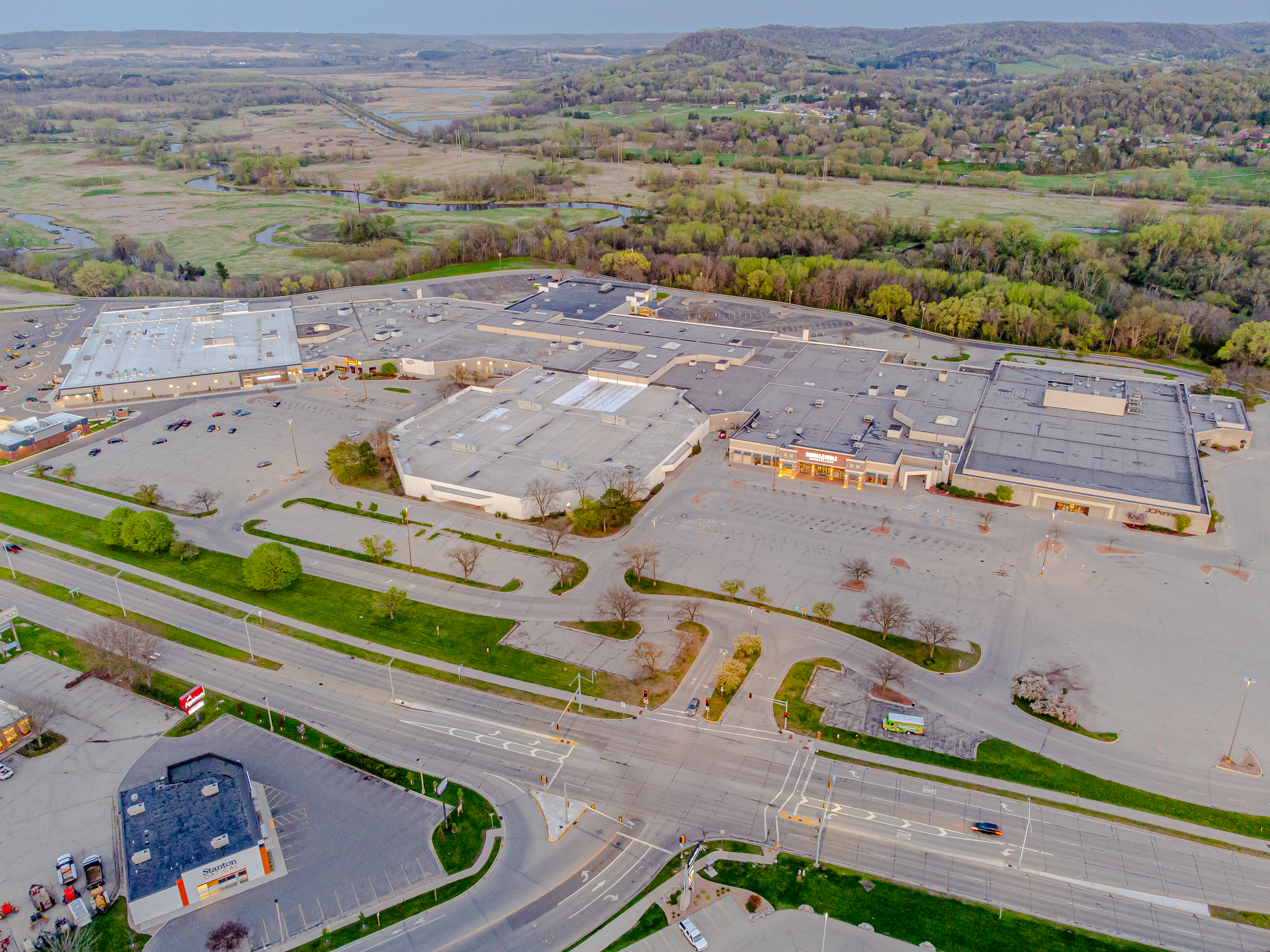
- Valley View Mall in 2023
- Location: La Crosse, Wisconsin, United States
- Coordinates: 43.86818°N 91.19631°W
- Address: 3800 State Road 16
- Opened: July 31, 1980; 46 years ago
- Developer: Equitable Life Insurance
- Owner: Kohan Retail Investment Group
- Architect: Architectonics, Inc.
- Num. of stores: 40+
- Num. of anchor tenants: 5 (4 open, 1 vacant)
- Floor area: 598,171 square feet (56,000 m^{2})
- Floors: 1
- Public transit: MTU: 5 9 SMRT: Green
- Website: myvalleyview.com

Valley View Mall is an enclosed shopping mall in La Crosse, Wisconsin, in the United States. Valley View Mall comprises 73 stores, restaurants, and a food court. The anchor stores are Barnes & Noble, JCPenney, Veterans Affairs Medical Center, and Hy-Vee. There is one vacant anchor store; Herberger's. Valley View Mall's trade area represents communities in three states with a radius of approximately 50 miles (80 km) surrounding the shopping center. It is located south of Interstate 90 in one of La Crosse's largest business districts.

== Flagship tenants ==
- Hy-Vee
- Veterans Affairs Medical Center
- JCPenney
- Barnes & Noble

== History ==
Valley View opened in July 1980, with four anchor stores and more than 40 additional retailers. It was designed by Architectonics, Inc. of Chicago. In 1985 the four anchor stores were Dayton's, Herberger's, Sears, and J.C. Penney. It was renovated in 1991, and a food court was added in 2001. In late 2006, a 22,400-square-foot (2,080 m^{2}) Barnes & Noble opened at the center. On January 4, 2017, Macy's announced that their store at the mall (the former Dayton's) would be closing as part of a plan to close 68 stores nationwide. The store closed on March 26, 2017. On April 26, 2017, it was announced that Herberger's would be relocating from their old store and expanding to the former Macy's space. The new store opened on September 14, 2017.

On April 18, 2018, it was announced that Herberger's would also be closing as parent company The Bon-Ton Stores was going out of business. The store closed on August 29, 2018. On August 22, 2018, Sears announced that its store would be closing as well as part of a plan to close 46 stores nationwide. The store closed in November 2018. After the store closed, Barnes & Noble and JCPenney are the only remaining anchors left. March 17, 2020, Valley View Mall was closed due to the coronavirus pandemic; however it has since reopened. PREIT in August 2020 lost ownership of the mall by court order, and under foreclosure it was put up for sale the next month. On October 18, 2022, Hy-Vee opened in the former Sears anchor. Kohan Retail Investment Group took over the property in 2023. In February 2024, demolition began on the abandoned Macy's anchor to make room for new restaurants and a carwash. In April 2024, Poke World opened its first Wisconsin location inside the food court. In August 2024, Valley View was forced to close for four days due to Kohan failing to pay the property's electric bill. In September 2026, it was announced that the La Crosse Winter Farmers Market would be held in Valley View Mall every other Saturday from November to April.
