= Viroqua (town), Wisconsin =

Viroqua, Wisconsin
- Town
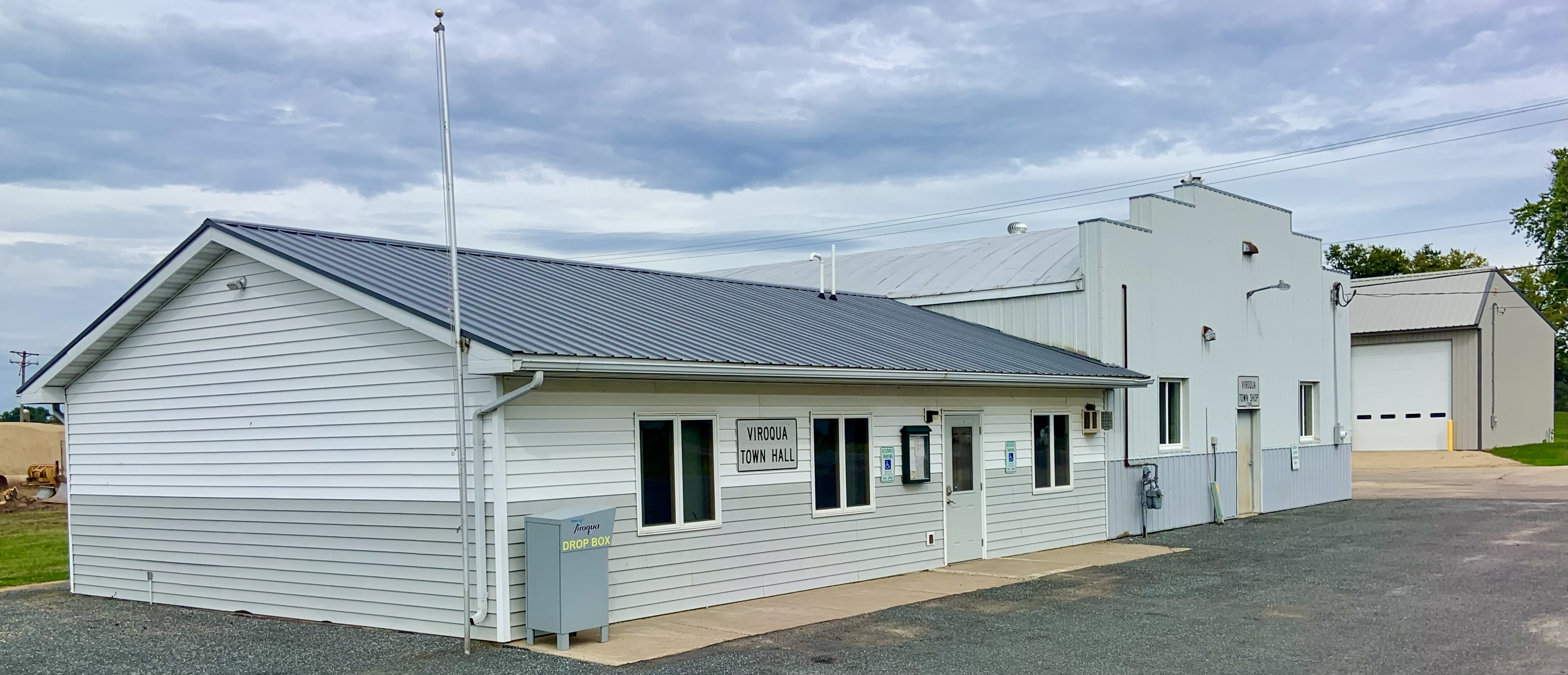
- Town hall

- Location in Vernon County and the state of Wisconsin.
- Coordinates: 43°34′37″N 90°51′4″W
- Country: United States
- State: Wisconsin
- County: Vernon

Area
  - Total: 48.4 sq mi (125.3 km^{2})
  - Land: 48.3 sq mi (125.2 km^{2})
  - Water: 0.039 sq mi (0.1 km^{2})
- Elevation: 1,198 ft (365 m)

Population (2020)
  - Total: 1,744
  - Density: 36.08/sq mi (13.93/km^{2})
- Time zone: UTC-6 (Central (CST))
  - Summer (DST): UTC-5 (CDT)
- Area code: 608
- FIPS code: 55-82950
- GNIS feature ID: 1584336

Viroqua is a town in Vernon County, Wisconsin, United States. The population was 1,744 at the 2020 census. The City of Viroqua is located within the town.

== Geography ==
According to the United States Census Bureau, the town has a total area of 48.4 square miles (125.3 km^{2}), of which 48.3 square miles (125.2 km^{2}) is land and 0.04 square mile (0.1 km^{2}) (0.06%) is water.

== Demographics ==
As of the census of 2000, there were 1,560 people, 549 households, and 419 families residing in the town. The population density was 32.3 people per square mile (12.5/km^{2}). There were 603 housing units at an average density of 12.5 per square mile (4.8/km^{2}). The racial makeup of the town was 98.97% White, 0.06% Native American, 0.26% Asian, 0.06% from other races, and 0.64% from two or more races. 0.26% of the population were Hispanic or Latino of any race.

There were 549 households, out of which 34.4% had children under the age of 18 living with them, 66.7% were married couples living together, 5.1% had a female householder with no husband present, and 23.5% were non-families. 19.5% of all households were made up of individuals, and 8.7% had someone living alone who was 65 years of age or older. The average household size was 2.64 and the average family size was 3.04.

In the town, the population was spread out, with 24.9% under the age of 18, 6.4% from 18 to 24, 23.5% from 25 to 44, 27.2% from 45 to 64, and 17.9% who were 65 years of age or older. The median age was 43 years. For every 100 females, there were 98.7 males. For every 100 females age 18 and over, there were 100.5 males.

The median income for a household in the town was $42,583, and the median income for a family was $45,179. Males had a median income of $31,736 versus $23,194 for females. The per capita income for the town was $16,246. About 6.6% of families and 9.7% of the population were below the poverty line, including 15.6% of those under age 18 and 10.0% of those age 65 or over.
