= Viroqua Municipal Airport =

Airport in Wisconsin, United States

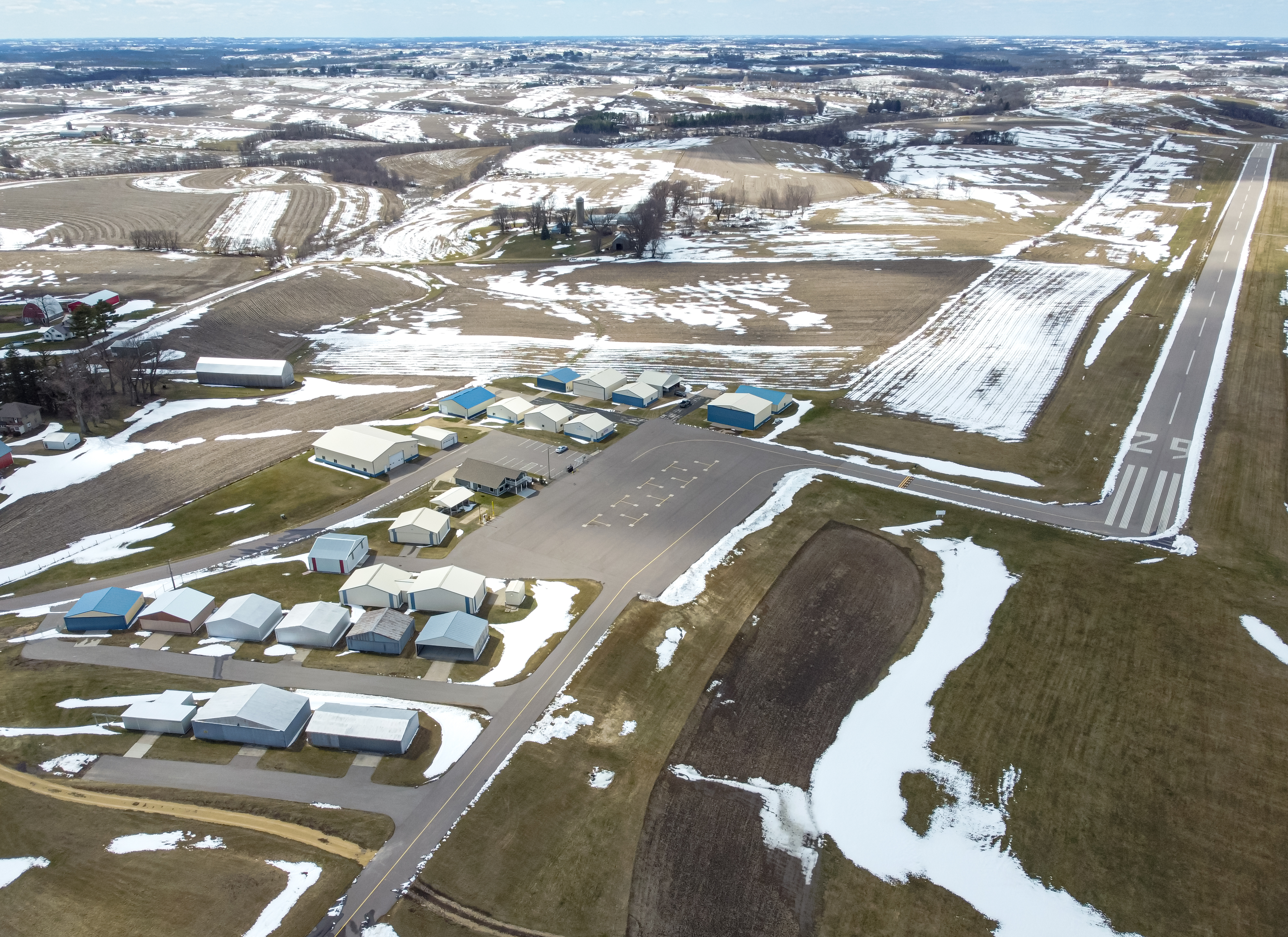
- IATA: none; ICAO: none; FAA LID: Y51

Summary
- Airport type: Public
- Owner: City of Viroqua
- Serves: Viroqua, Wisconsin
- Opened: May 1964
- Time zone: CST (UTC−06:00)
  - Summer (DST): CDT (UTC−05:00)
- Elevation AMSL: 1,292 ft (394 m)
- Coordinates: 43°34′47″N 090°53′52″W
- Website: https://viroqua-wisconsin.com/services/airport.php

Map
- Location of airport in Wisconsin Y51 (the United States)

Runways
Direction	Length		Surface
Direction	ft	m	Surface
11/29	4,000	1,219	Asphalt
2/20	2,424	739	Turf

Statistics
- Aircraft operations (2023): 9,600
- Based aircraft (2024): 18
- Source: Federal Aviation Administration

Viroqua Municipal Airport, (FAA LID: Y51) is a city owned public use airport located 2 miles (3 km) north of the central business district of Viroqua, Wisconsin, a city in Vernon County, Wisconsin, United States. It is included in the Federal Aviation Administration (FAA) National Plan of Integrated Airport Systems for 2025–2029, in which it is categorized as a local general aviation facility.

Although most airports in the United States use the same three-letter location identifier for the FAA and International Air Transport Association (IATA), this airport is assigned Y51 by the FAA but has no designation from the IATA.

== Facilities and aircraft ==
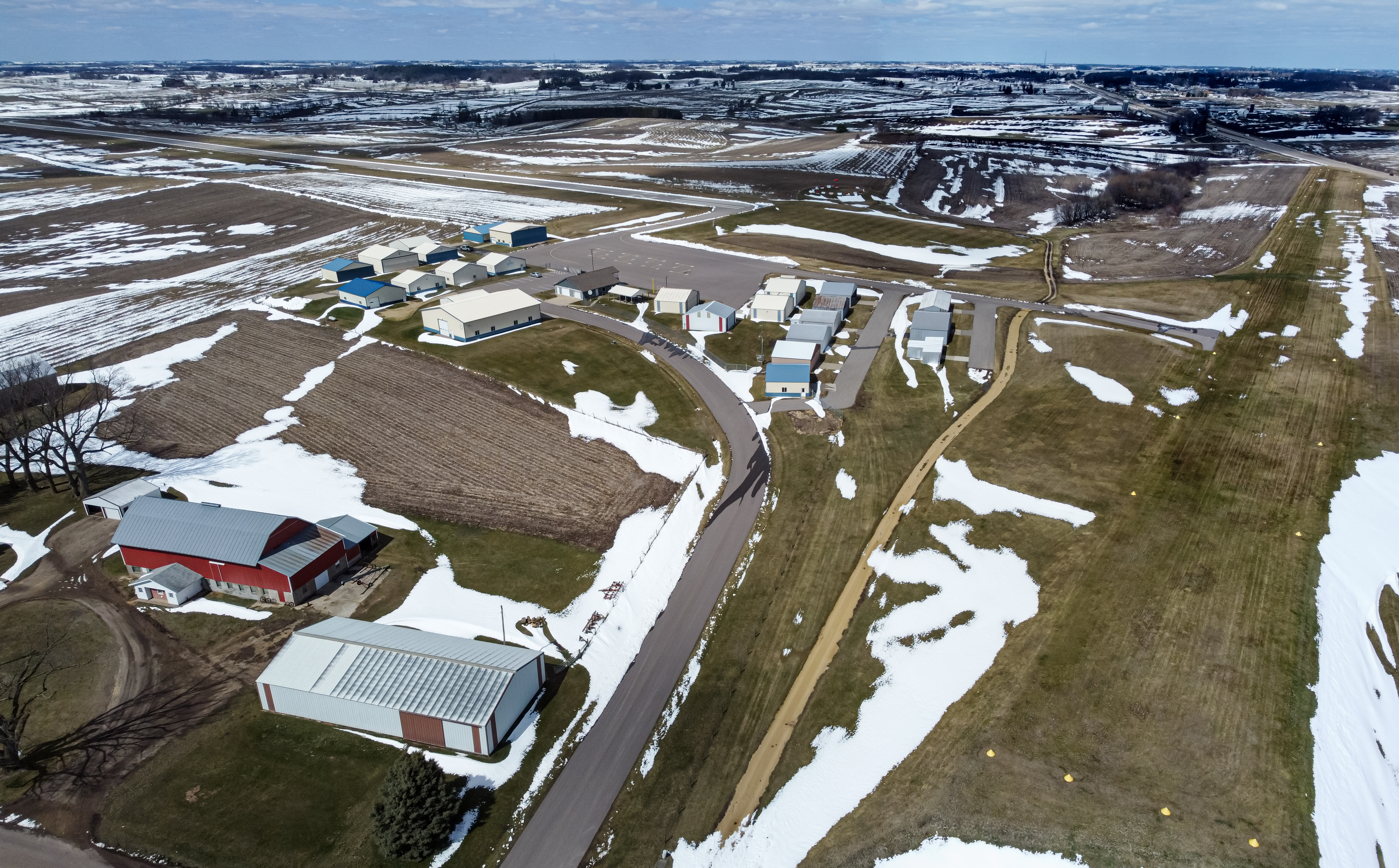
Asphalt runway and grass runway

Viroqua Municipal Airport covers an area of 147 acres (59 ha) at an elevation of 1,292 feet (394 m) above mean sea level. It has two runways: 11/29 is 4,000 by 60 feet (1,219 x 18 m) with an asphalt surface, it has approved GPS approaches and 2/20 is 2,424 by 90 feet (739 x 27 m) with a turf surface.

For the 12-month period ending August 18, 2023, the airport had 9,600 aircraft operations: 99% general aviation, less than 1% air taxi and less than 1% military. In July 2024, there were 18 aircraft based at this airport: all 18 single-engine.

== See also ==
- List of airports in Wisconsin
