= Hjalmer S. Halvorsen =

American businessman and politician

Hjalmer S. "H.S." Halvorsen (April 9, 1884 – 1970) was an American businessman and politician.

Born on a farm near Westby, Wisconsin, Halvorsen went to Luther College. From 1911 to 1914, he was deputy county auditor for Wells County, North Dakota. Halvorsen owned a hardware store, in Westby, Wisconsin, served on the Westby Common Council and the board of education. Halvorsen served in the Wisconsin State Assembly in 1933, 1935, and 1937 and was elected on the Wisconsin Progressive Party ticket.
