= Scenic Mississippi Regional Transit =

Commuter bus system in Wisconsin, United States

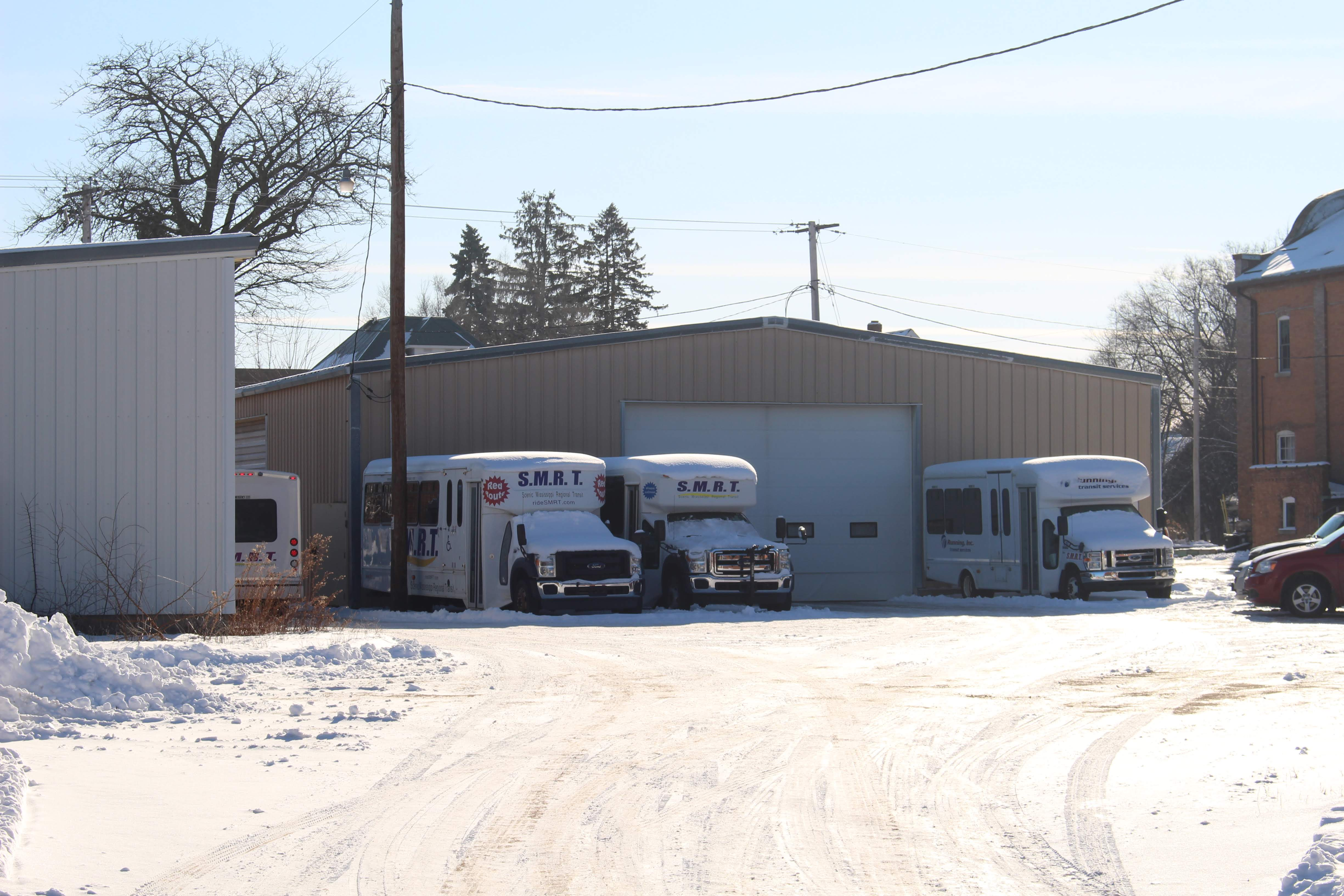
- SMRT buses in Viroqua
- Founded: December 3, 2012
- Headquarters: 318 W Decker St, Viroqua, WI 54665
- Locale: Driftless Region
- Service type: bus service
- Routes: 4
- Annual ridership: 20,585 (2019)
- Website: https://ridesmrt.com/

Scenic Mississippi Regional Transit or SMRT is a commuter bus system serving the Driftless Area of Wisconsin. It provides four routes which serve Crawford County, La Crosse County, Monroe County and Vernon County. It was recognized by Wisconsin Rural Partners as one of Wisconsin’s Top Rural Development Initiatives in 2017.

SMRT will cease operations on December 31, 2026.

== Services ==
The transit system operates four routes. Each route runs 3 times per day, except the yellow route, which operates 4 times per day. There is no service on weekends.The routes are as follows:

- Blue Route: La Crosse - Viroqua
- Green Route: La Crosse - Tomah
- Red Route: La Crosse - Prairie du Chien
- Yellow Route: La Crosse - Viroqua

In 2017, a study was conducted on providing service to Arcadia, however, no service has begun. Service to Cashton was proposed in the 2021 La Crosse Regional Transit Development Plan.

In 2026 the boards of Vernon, Monroe and Crawford counties voted to end funding for SMRT leaving La Crosse County fully responsible for funding the service. La Crosse County officials determined that it was no longer feasible to subsidize the service. SMRT is expected to end operations by the end of 2026.

== Communities Served ==
- Crawford County
  - De Soto
  - Ferryville
  - Lynxville
  - Prairie du Chien
- La Crosse County
  - La Crosse
  - West Salem
- Monroe County
  - Sparta
  - Tomah
- Vernon County
  - Coon Valley
  - Genoa
  - Stoddard
  - Viroqua
  - Westby

== Ridership ==
Ridership by Year
	Ridership	Change over previous year
2013	13,013	n/a
2014	18,100	▲39.09%
2015	19,223	▲6.2%
2016	20,848	▲8.45%
2017	19,571	▼6.13%
2018	21,303	▲8.85%
2019	20,585	▼3.37%

== See also ==
- La Crosse MTU
- The Jule
- Platteville Public Transportation
