= Viroqua, Wisconsin =

- City
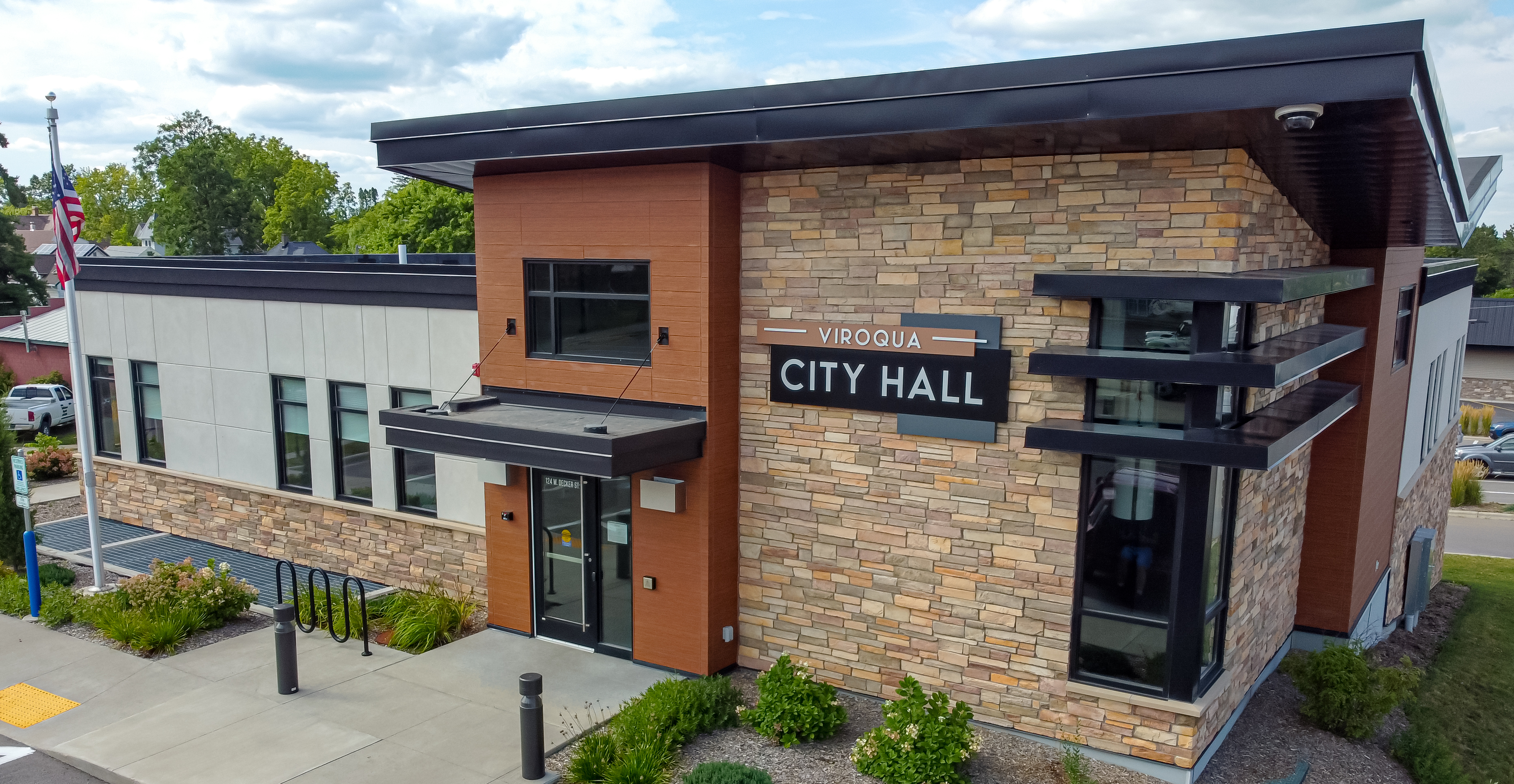
- Viroqua City Hall
- Interactive map of Viroqua, Wisconsin
- Location within Wisconsin Location within the United States
- Coordinates: 43°33′24″N 90°53′16″W
- Country: United States
- State: Wisconsin
- County: Vernon

Area
  - Total: 4.36 sq mi (11.29 km^{2})
  - Land: 4.36 sq mi (11.29 km^{2})
  - Water: 0 sq mi (0.00 km^{2})

Population (2020)
  - Total: 4,504
  - Density: 1,033.7/sq mi (399.1/km^{2})
- Time zone: UTC-6 (Central (CST))
  - Summer (DST): UTC-5 (CDT)
- ZIP codes: 54665
- Area code: 608
- FIPS code: 55-82925
- Website: viroqua-wisconsin.com

Viroqua is the county seat of Vernon County, Wisconsin, United States. The population was 4,504 at the 2020 census. The city is within the town of Viroqua.

== History ==
The Native American Ho-Chunk people inhabited the area now known as Vernon County and the area of Viroqua. The Ho-Chunk, formerly known as the Winnebago, are a Siouan-speaking people who lived in the western Great Lakes region for thousands of years. The Ho-Chunk were removed westward beginning in the 1820s.

The town was originally named "Farwell" after Governor Leonard J. Farwell, but was renamed Viroqua in 1854. It is unclear why the name was changed, and the source of the name is uncertain. One legend states that Viroqua was the name of the daughter of Black Hawk, but this is not supported by evidence. Another story attributes the name to a Mohawk Indian actress who performed in a theater on the East Coast or in Brantford, Canada. However, the town most likely took its name from the fictional lead character of the 1848 novel Viroqua, or, the Flower of the Ottawas by Emma Carra.

Decker was one of the early settlers in the area. He arrived in 1847 and laid out the village of Viroqua. He died in 1860. Earlier settlers arrived in 1844 and built lumber mills on the Kickapoo River. Farmers began arriving in 1846, some of whom were John Graham, T.J. Defreese and William C. McMichael.

In early 1851, the act authorizing the organization of Bad Axe, now Vernon County, was approved by Governor Nelson Dewey. Viroqua was awarded the county seat, pending a permanent location to be determined by a vote. There was a sharp rivalry between Viroqua and Springville to be named the county seat of Vernon County. A deed for 40 acres (160,000 m^{2}) of land was promised by pioneer Moses Decker, on condition that Viroqua be chosen as the county seat. The land constituted what became known as the County Addition to the city of Viroqua.

In May 1852, residents voted in favor of Viroqua. The present Vernon County Courthouse was built in Viroqua in 1880. On June 28, 1865, Viroqua was hit by a deadly tornado that left 22 dead.

== Geography ==
Viroqua is located at 43°33′23″N 90°53′15″W (43.556534, -90.887663). According to the United States Census Bureau, the city has a total area of 3.80 square miles (9.84 km^{2}), all land. The city is in the Driftless Region, near the western end of the Ocooch Mountains.

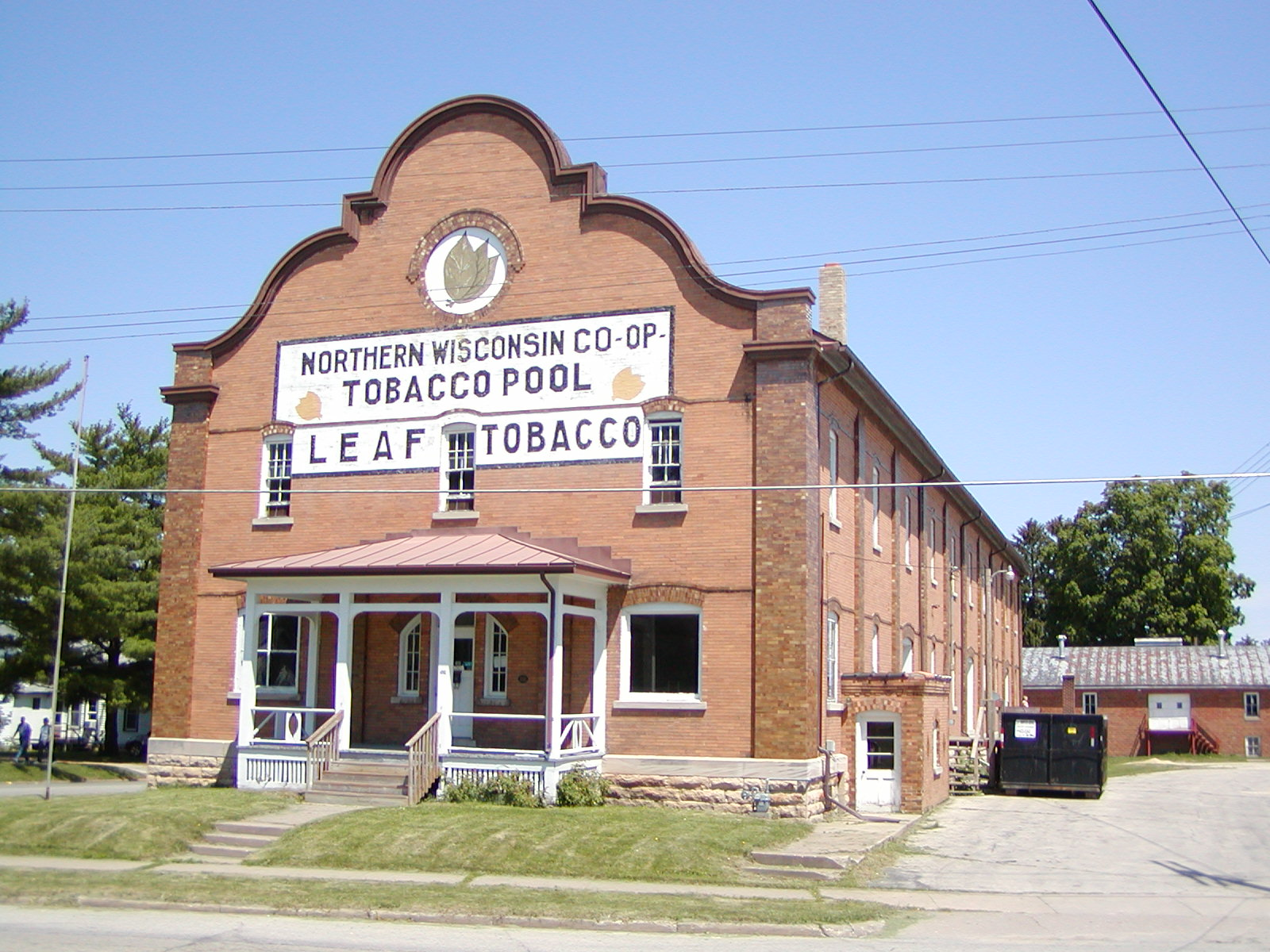
Northern Wisconsin Co-op Tobacco Pool Warehouse represents the first tobacco-grower co-operative in the nation.

=== Climate ===
Climate data for Viroqua, Wisconsin, 1991–2020 normals, extremes 1893–present
Month	Jan	Feb	Mar	Apr	May	Jun	Jul	Aug	Sep	Oct	Nov	Dec	Year
Record high °F (°C)	55 (13)	66 (19)	83 (28)	90 (32)	106 (41)	101 (38)	108 (42)	103 (39)	99 (37)	90 (32)	78 (26)	64 (18)	108 (42)
Mean maximum °F (°C)	42.4 (5.8)	47.9 (8.8)	64.0 (17.8)	76.2 (24.6)	83.2 (28.4)	87.5 (30.8)	89.4 (31.9)	88.2 (31.2)	84.2 (29.0)	77.5 (25.3)	61.2 (16.2)	47.6 (8.7)	91.2 (32.9)
Mean daily maximum °F (°C)	22.9 (−5.1)	27.6 (−2.4)	40.4 (4.7)	54.3 (12.4)	66.0 (18.9)	75.3 (24.1)	79.1 (26.2)	77.4 (25.2)	70.2 (21.2)	56.9 (13.8)	41.2 (5.1)	28.4 (−2.0)	53.3 (11.8)
Daily mean °F (°C)	14.5 (−9.7)	18.6 (−7.4)	30.9 (−0.6)	43.7 (6.5)	55.4 (13.0)	65.3 (18.5)	69.0 (20.6)	67.2 (19.6)	59.3 (15.2)	46.7 (8.2)	32.8 (0.4)	20.8 (−6.2)	43.7 (6.5)
Mean daily minimum °F (°C)	6.1 (−14.4)	9.5 (−12.5)	21.3 (−5.9)	33.1 (0.6)	44.8 (7.1)	55.3 (12.9)	59.0 (15.0)	57.1 (13.9)	48.3 (9.1)	36.4 (2.4)	24.4 (−4.2)	13.1 (−10.5)	34.0 (1.1)
Mean minimum °F (°C)	−16.8 (−27.1)	−12.0 (−24.4)	0.1 (−17.7)	18.8 (−7.3)	30.6 (−0.8)	42.0 (5.6)	48.3 (9.1)	46.6 (8.1)	33.9 (1.1)	22.6 (−5.2)	7.1 (−13.8)	−8.0 (−22.2)	−20.3 (−29.1)
Record low °F (°C)	−42 (−41)	−37 (−38)	−35 (−37)	−8 (−22)	22 (−6)	30 (−1)	36 (2)	32 (0)	20 (−7)	1 (−17)	−17 (−27)	−36 (−38)	−42 (−41)
Average precipitation inches (mm)	1.16 (29)	1.14 (29)	1.99 (51)	3.98 (101)	4.72 (120)	5.70 (145)	4.58 (116)	4.58 (116)	3.94 (100)	2.65 (67)	1.98 (50)	1.58 (40)	38.00 (965)
Average snowfall inches (cm)	11.3 (29)	10.4 (26)	7.1 (18)	3.8 (9.7)	0.0 (0.0)	0.0 (0.0)	0.0 (0.0)	0.0 (0.0)	0.0 (0.0)	0.4 (1.0)	4.0 (10)	10.2 (26)	30.0 (76)
Average precipitation days (≥ 0.01 in)	8.0	7.0	7.7	10.8	12.5	11.2	9.8	9.1	9.9	8.9	7.7	8.4	111.0
Average snowy days (≥ 0.1 in)	7.4	6.6	3.9	1.6	0.0	0.0	0.0	0.0	0.0	0.4	2.7	7.4	30
Source 1: NOAA
Source 2: National Weather Service

== Demographics ==
Historical population
Census	Pop.	Note	%±
1880	762		—
1890	1,270		66.7%
1900	1,950		53.5%
1910	2,059		5.6%
1920	2,574		25.0%
1930	2,792		8.5%
1940	3,549		27.1%
1950	3,795		6.9%
1960	3,926		3.5%
1970	3,739		−4.8%
1980	3,716		−0.6%
1990	3,922		5.5%
2000	4,335		10.5%
2010	4,362		0.6%
2020	4,504		3.3%
U.S. Decennial Census; 2014 Estimate

=== 2020 census ===
As of the census of 2020, the population was 4,504. The population density was 1,033.7 inhabitants per square mile (399.1/km^{2}). There were 2,231 housing units at an average density of 512.0 per square mile (197.7/km^{2}). The racial makeup of the city was 93.1% White, 1.1% Black or African American, 0.4% Asian, 0.2% Native American, 0.9% from other races, and 4.2% from two or more races. Ethnically, the population was 2.2% Hispanic or Latino of any race.

According to the American Community Survey estimates for 2016–2020, the median income for a household in the city was $38,849, and the median income for a family was $55,075. Male full-time workers had a median income of $52,742 versus $39,178 for female workers. The per capita income for the city was $23,884. About 15.9% of families and 18.1% of the population were below the poverty line, including 14.5% of those under age 18 and 25.8% of those age 65 or over. Of the population age 25 and over, 94.3% were high school graduates or higher and 25.5% had a bachelor's degree or higher.

=== 2010 census ===
As of the census of 2010, there were 4,362 people, 2,029 households, and 1,059 families residing in the city. The population density was 1,147.9 inhabitants per square mile (443.2/km^{2}). There were 2,208 housing units at an average density of 581.1 per square mile (224.4/km^{2}). The racial makeup of the city was 97.1% White, 0.6% African American, 0.3% Native American, 0.6% Asian, 0.1% Pacific Islander, 0.4% from other races, and 1.0% from two or more races. Hispanic or Latino of any race were 1.0% of the population.

There were 2,029 households, of which 25.5% had children under the age of 18 living with them, 39.0% were married couples living together, 10.0% had a female householder with no husband present, 3.2% had a male householder with no wife present, and 47.8% were non-families. 43.1% of all households were made up of individuals, and 23% had someone living alone who was 65 years of age or older. The average household size was 2.06 and the average family size was 2.86.

The median age in the city was 45 years. 21.6% of residents were under the age of 18; 6.2% were between the ages of 18 and 24; 22.4% were from 25 to 44; 26.3% were from 45 to 64; and 23.6% were 65 years of age or older. The gender makeup of the city was 46.1% male and 53.9% female.

=== 2000 census ===
As of the census of 2000, there were 4,335 people, 1,990 households, and 1,112 families residing in the city. The population density was 1,327.3 people per square mile (511.9/km^{2}). There were 2,105 housing units at an average density of 644.5 per square mile (248.5/km^{2}). The racial makeup of the city was 98.73% White, 0.07% Black or African American, 0.16% Native American, 0.46% Asian, 0.18% from other races, and 0.39% from two or more races. 0.69% of the population were Hispanic or Latino of any race.

There were 1,990 households, out of which 24.5% had children under the age of 18 living with them, 43.6% were married couples living together, 9.3% had a female householder with no husband present, and 44.1% were non-families. 39.5% of all households were made up of individuals, and 22.7% had someone living alone who was 65 years of age or older. The average household size was 2.10 and the average family size was 2.81.

In the city, the population was spread out, with 21.4% under the age of 18, 7.5% from 18 to 24, 23.3% from 25 to 44, 21.6% from 45 to 64, and 26.2% who were 65 years of age or older. The median age was 44 years. For every 100 females, there were 82.7 males. For every 100 females age 18 and over, there were 77.8 males.

== Economy ==
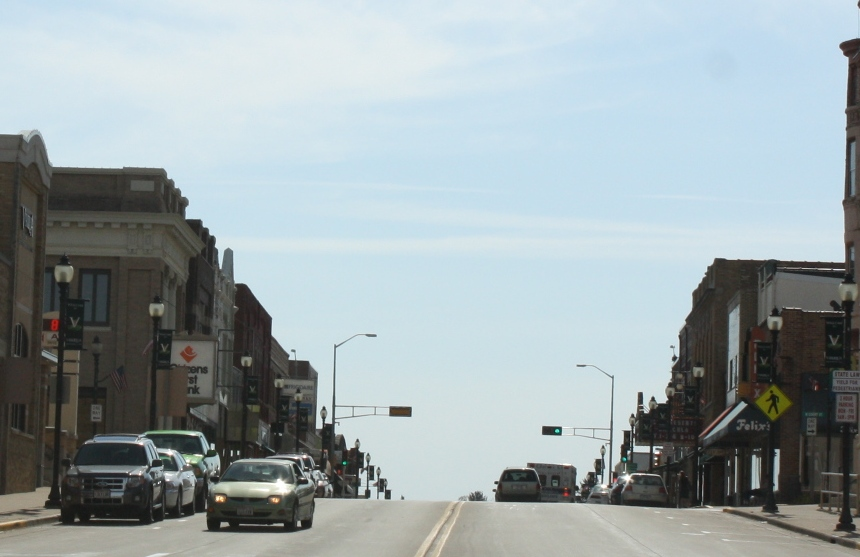
Viroqua Downtown Historic District

Viroqua is an accredited Main Street America city. Its downtown is listed on the Wisconsin and National Register of Historic Places.

Viroqua was dubbed "The Town That Beat Walmart" by Smithsonian Magazine in 1992 because it fostered businesses that co-exist with the retail giant. The city and its nonprofit chamber of commerce, the Viroqua Chamber Main Street, actively promote small business development through several state and federal programs. One noteworthy program that has kept downtown storefronts occupied has been the Pop-Up Shop Initiative, which allow entrepreneurs to use a space downtown rent-free for the holiday season.

Viroqua is a site of food tourism, as surrounding Vernon County is home to one of the highest densities of organic farms in the country, with over 200 in the area.

== Arts and culture ==
The Temple Theatre serves as an arts and cultural center for surrounding counties. A $1.6 million restoration of the 1922 classical revival style vaudeville and movie theater was driven by volunteers.

There are a large number of organic farms in the Driftless Region surrounding Viroqua, which supports startup business ventures, restaurants, and a budding tourism industry.

== Government ==
Viroqua is governed by a mayor and city council. The mayor of Viroqua is Krista Browne.

Presidential elections results
Year	Republican	Democratic	Third parties
2024	37.4% 954	59.7% 1522	2.9% 74
2020	37.9% 948	60.3% 1509	1.8% 45
2016	39.7% 889	53.0% 1187	7.3% 163

== Education ==
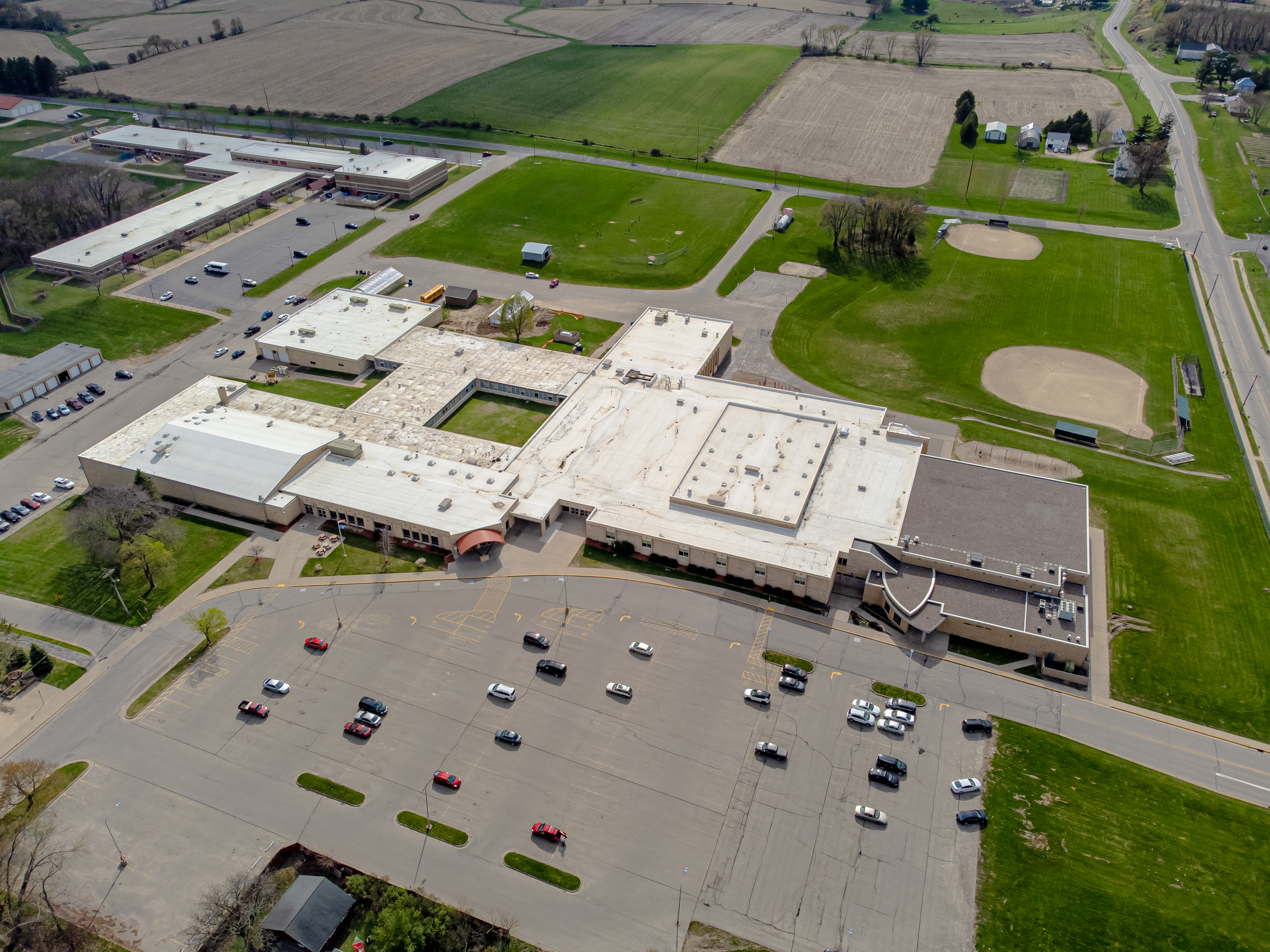
Viroqua High School

- Viroqua High School
- Viroqua Middle School
- Viroqua Elementary School
- Driftless Folk School
- Pleasant Ridge Waldorf School
- English Lutheran School
- Youth Initiative High School
- Laurel High School
- Better Futures High School
- Thoreau College
- Western Technical College offers classes in Viroqua

== Transportation ==
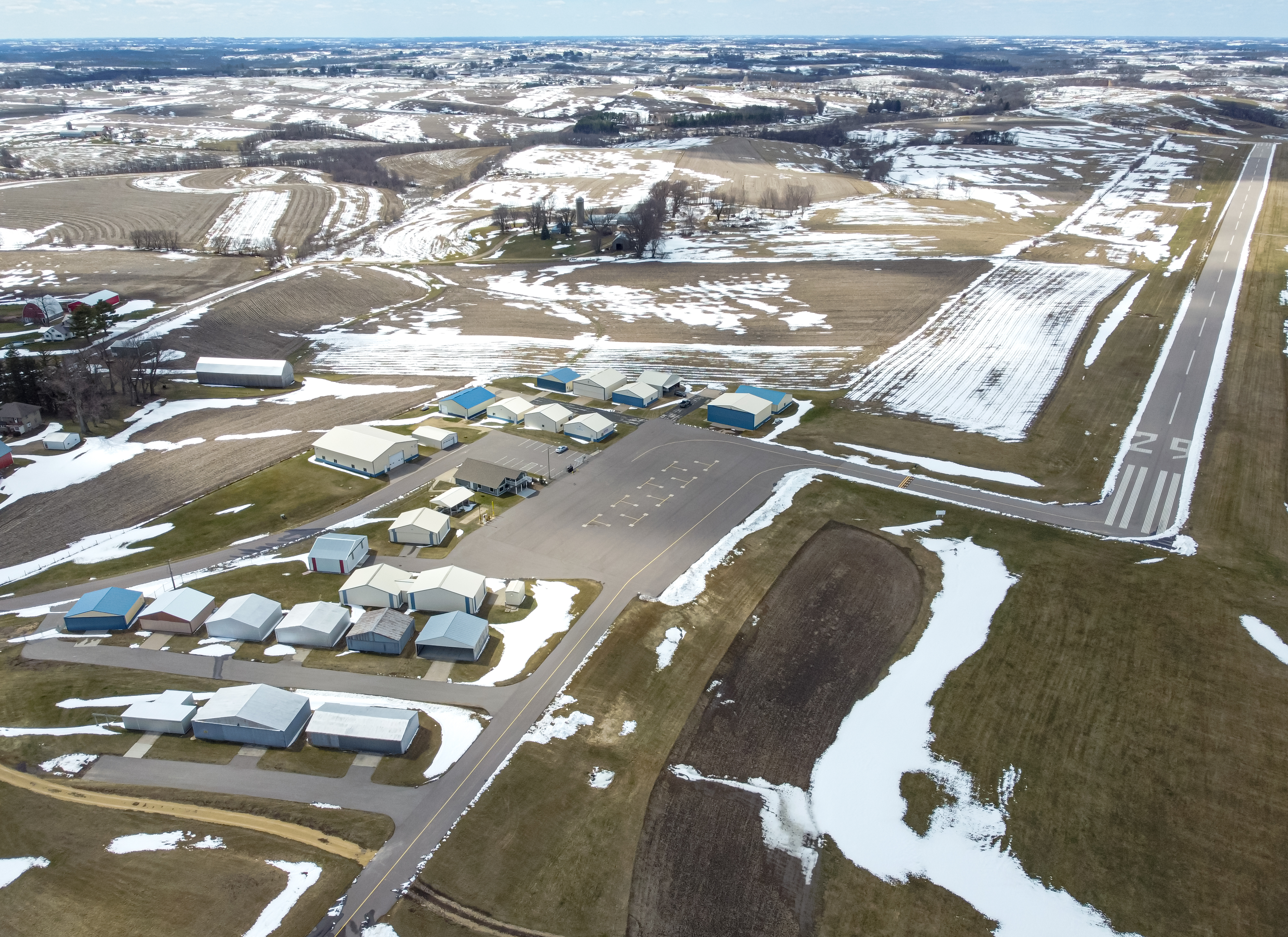
Viroqua Municipal Airport

Viroqua is at the intersection of U.S. Highway 14, U.S. Highway 61, Wisconsin Highway 27, Wisconsin Highway 56, and Wisconsin Highway 82. Commuter bus service towards La Crosse is provided seven times daily per direction by Scenic Mississippi Regional Transit.

Viroqua is serviced by the Viroqua Municipal Airport (Y51). Viroqua was on the new airways route between La Crosse and Rockford, Illinois, when it was established in June 1932. The beacon light had about 15 large 36-inch (910 mm) revolving beacons of 2,000,000 candle power when it was installed on the Mahlon Lepley farm, four miles (6 km) northeast of Viroqua.

Viroqua was formerly served by a Milwaukee Road branch line from Sparta via Leon, Melvina, Cashton and Westby.

== Notable people ==
- Joseph D. Beck, U.S. Representative
- J. Henry Bennett, legislator and lawyer
- Cyrus M. Butt, legislator and lawyer
- Henry Conner, legislator
- Andrew H. Dahl, Wisconsin State Legislature
- John Field, football player and coach, businessman
- Frederick C. Finkle, geologist
- Amos Fries, United States Army general
- James Gillett, former Governor of California
- Lawrence Grimsrud, legislator and lawyer
- Frank Bateman Keefe, U.S. Representative
- Meade Layne, early ufologist
- Mark C. Lee, United States astronaut
- Bernard Lewison, businessman and legislator
- Craig Minowa, musician and environmental activist
- Chris Mulkey, actor and musician, born in Viroqua
- Oliver Munson, Wisconsin State Legislature
- William Nelson, Wisconsin State Senator
- Daniel B. Priest, lawyer and legislator
- Brian Rude, Wisconsin State Legislature
- Jeremiah McLain Rusk, governor of Wisconsin, Secretary of Agriculture
- Lycurgus J. Rusk, Wisconsin legislator, soldier and lawyer
- Rudy Silbaugh, Wisconsin State Legislature
- Freddie Slack, American swing and boogie-woogie pianist and bandleader
- August E. Smith, educator and legislator
- Gerald L. K. Smith, founder of Share Our Wealth Movement, grew up in Viroqua
- Jill Soltau, Former CEO of JCPenney
- J. Henry Tate, Wisconsin legislator and businessman
- Thorleif T. Peterson Wisconsin state legislator and farmer
- Richard Tubb, personal physician to former president George W. Bush
- Butch Vig, record producer and musician
- William V. Weber, Michigan State Representative
- Jerome H. Wheelock, Wisconsin legislator and educator
