= La Crosse Municipal Transit Utility =

Mass transit provider in La Crosse, Wisconsin

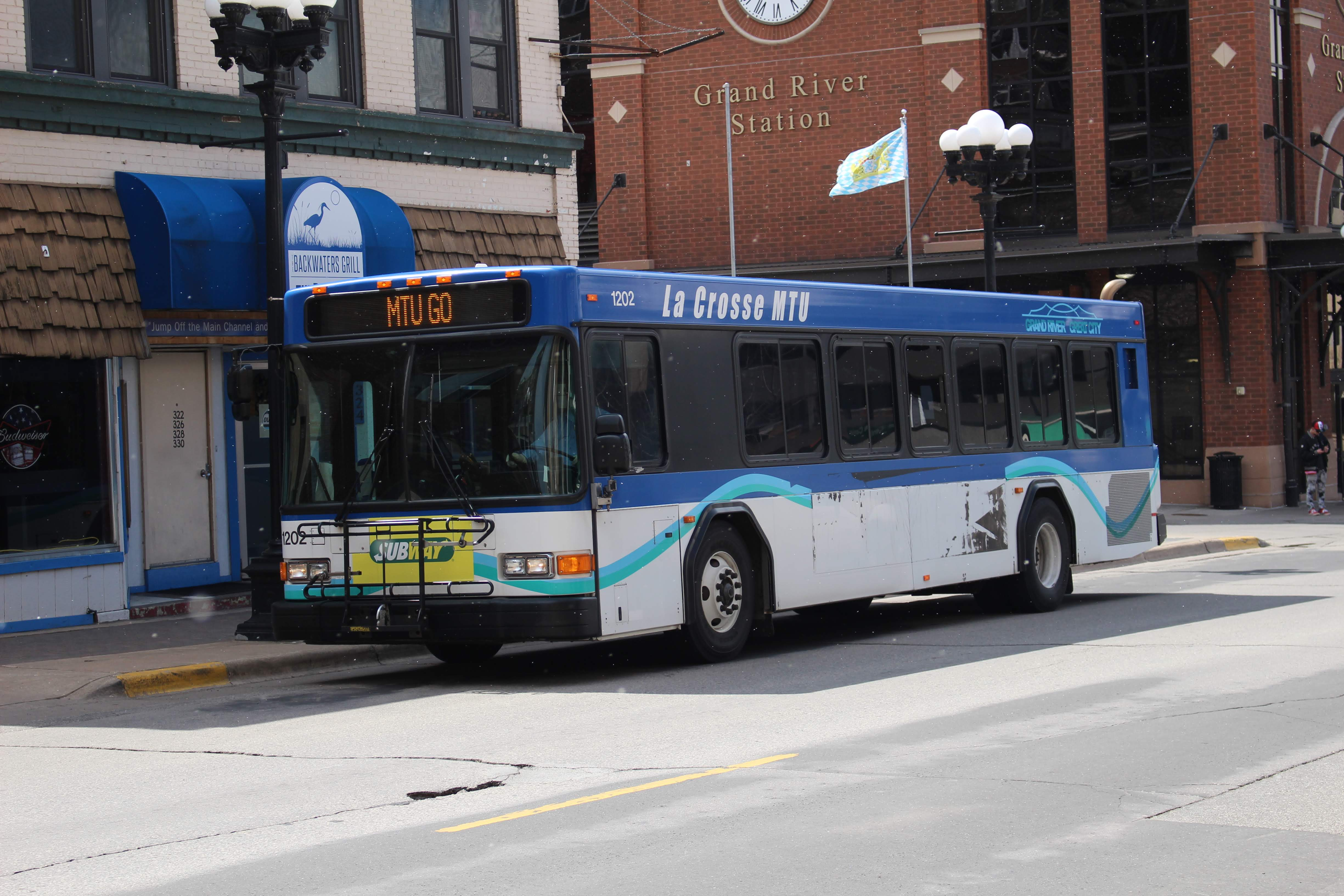
- MTU bus in 2020
- Parent: City of La Crosse
- Founded: January 2, 1975
- Headquarters: 2000 Marco Dr.
- Locale: La Crosse, Wisconsin
- Service area: La Crosse County, Wisconsin
- Service type: Bus service, Paratransit
- Routes: 11
- Hubs: Clinton & Caledonia Transfer Point
- Stations: Grand River Station
- Fleet: 21
- Annual ridership: 713,823 (2024)
- Website: La Crosse MTU

The La Crosse Municipal Transit Utility or MTU is the primary provider of mass transportation in La Crosse, Wisconsin. Using 21 buses, eleven regular routes are provided from Monday through Friday. On Saturdays, the MTU runs six routes, and five routes on Sundays.

== History ==
Public transit in La Crosse began with the opening of a horse-drawn streetcar line in 1879. Over time, more streetcar lines were added, and in 1893, all streetcars had been electrified. Beginning in the early 20th century, however, increasing car ownership led to a decline of the privately run streetcar system. As a result, buses began to replace streetcars throughout the city, and by November 1945, the last streetcar line closed. The City of La Crosse took over operations of the buses in 1975 from the Mississippi Valley Public Service Company, as the buses could no longer be operated profitably.

In 1945, in the first timetable after streetcar service had ended, there were four bus routes. The earliest bus left at 5:40 am and the last bus returned at 1:00 am. Buses ran at a 10 to 15-minute headway throughout the day. In total, the buses provided close to 1520 hours of service per week. In 2022, the MTU provided only around 1142 hours of service per week, a decline of nearly 25%.

In 2019, a real-time bus tracking mobile app was launched. The first two electric buses were introduced to the system on June 13, 2022, which was followed in October with the launch of a mobile app for fare payment.

== Routes ==
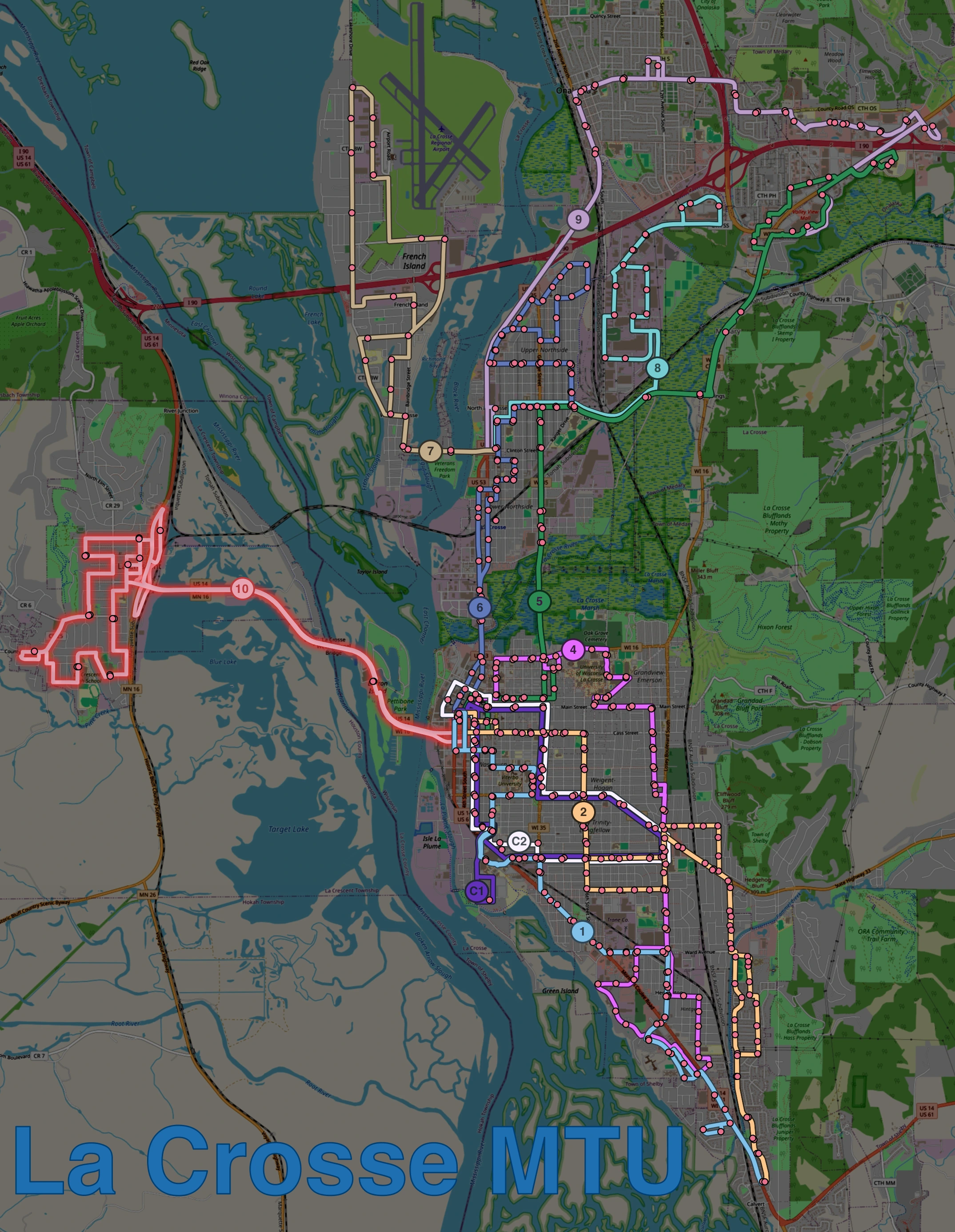
La Crosse MTU Routes

The MTU provides these routes seven days a week with varying service levels:

- Route 1: South Avenue
- Route 2: Green Bay
- Route 4: Losey Boulevard
- Route 5: Valley View Mall
- Route 6: Northside

Weekday only services:

- Route 7: French Island
- Route 8: Crossing Meadows
- Route 9: Onalaska
- Circulator Route 1
- Circulator Route 2

Services Mon–Sat only:

- Route 10: La Crescent Apple Express

== Grand River Station ==
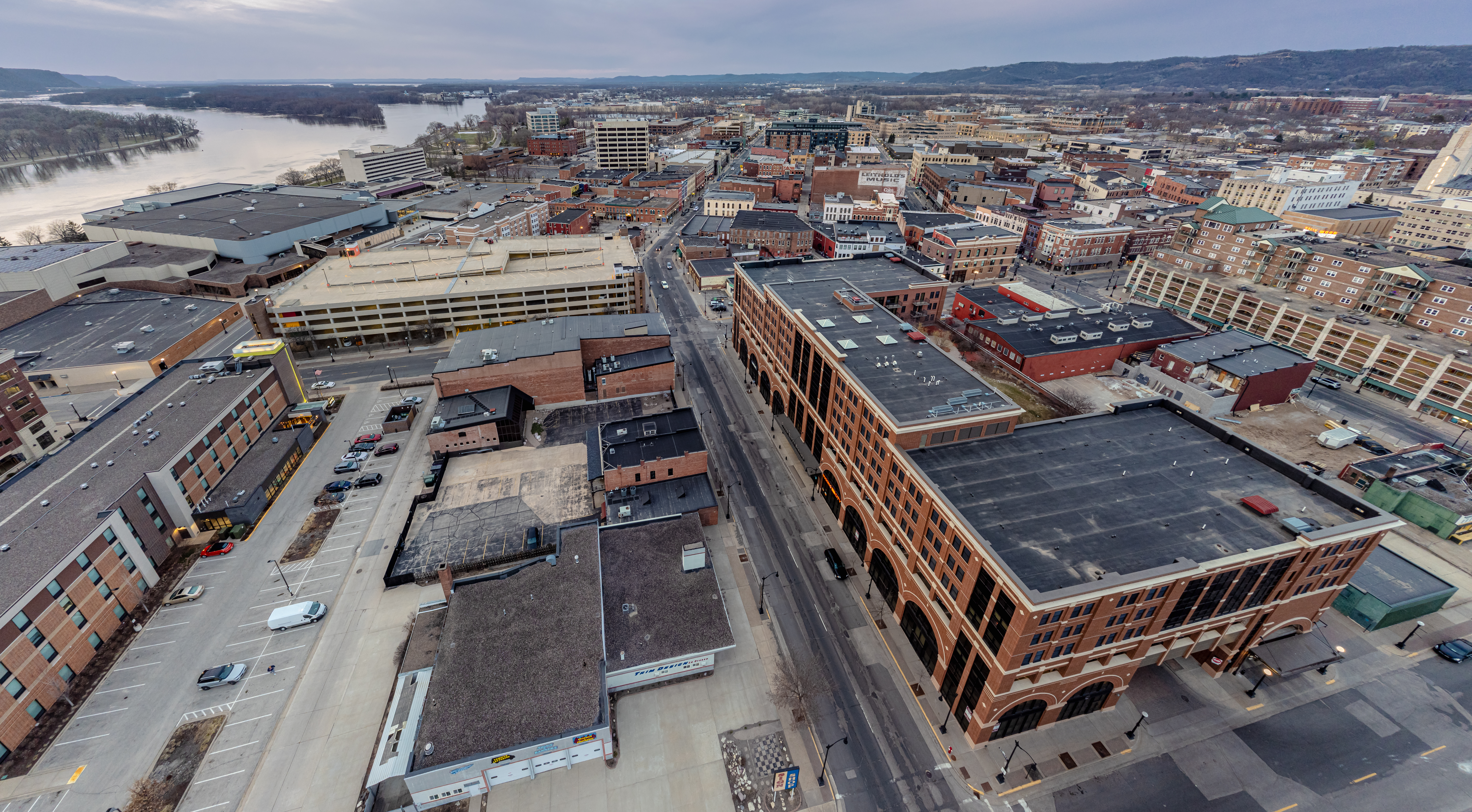
Grand River Station (on right)

Grand River Station is the downtown mixed-use transfer point for most MTU routes and offers a ticket counter, along with retail and housing. The center opened on August 25, 2010, allowing transfers between MTU buses, intercity buses, and commuter buses. Before construction of Grand River Station, transfers between buses occurred by the Post Office at the intersection of 5th Avenue and State Street.

== Ridership ==
| | Total Ridership | Change | Fixed Route Ridership | Change |
|---|---|---|---|---|
| 2013 | 1,229,410 | ▲6.65% | 1,175,528 | n/a |
| 2014 | 1,223,182 | ▼0.51% | 1,192,752 | ▲1.47% |
| 2015 | 1,128,992 | ▼7.7% | 1,102,173 | ▼7.59% |
| 2016 | 1,059,472 | ▼6.16% | 1,032,964 | ▼6.28% |
| 2017 | 1,025,797 | ▼3.18% | 999,955 | ▼3.2% |
| 2018 | 980,865 | ▼4.38% | 959,453 | ▼4.05% |
| 2019 | 923,030 | ▼5.9% | 905,412 | ▼5.63% |
| 2020 | 562,145 | ▼39.1% | 552,719 | ▼38.95% |
| 2021 | 524,717 | ▼6.66% | 510,235 | ▼7.69% |
| 2022 | 606,371 | ▲15.56% | 587,835 | ▲15.21% |
| 2023 | 685,372 | ▲13.03% | 667,034 | ▲13.47% |

== Fleet ==
La Crosse Municipal Transit Utility bus

The MTU bus fleet is composed primarily of Gillig Low Floor models. As of 2021, the 22 buses in the fleet had an average age of nearly 8 years, down from a high of over 12 years in 2018. As of 2023, the bus fleet comprised the following vehicles:

| Count | Year | Manufacturer | Model |
|---|---|---|---|
| 17 | 2002-2021 | Gillig | Low Floor 35' |
| 4 | 2012-2023 | Gillig | Low Floor HEV 35' |
| 2 | 2021 | Proterra | ZX5 35' |

== See also ==
- La Crosse station
- Scenic Mississippi Regional Transit
- Winona Transit Service
- Eau Claire Transit
- Rochester Public Transit
