= Portage station =

Train station in Portage, WI

Portage, WI
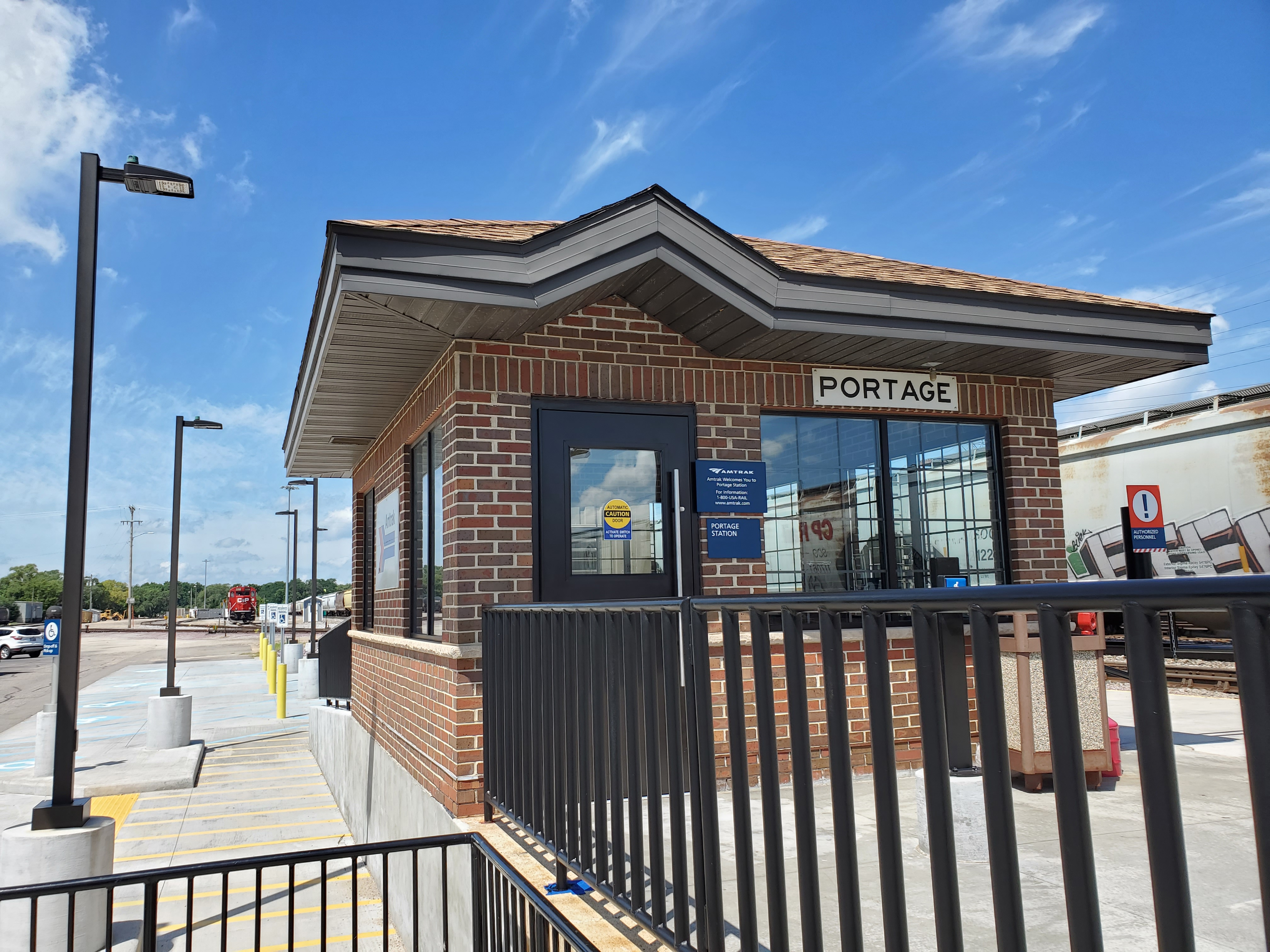
- Portage station in July 2020

General information
- Location: 400 West Oneida Street; Portage, Wisconsin; United States
- Coordinates: 43.5471°N 89.4677°W
- Owner: Canadian Pacific Kansas City
- Line: CPKC Tomah/Watertown Subdivisions
- Platforms: 1 side platform
- Tracks: 2
- Connections: Lamers Bus Lines

Construction
- Parking: Yes
- Accessible: Yes

Other information
- Station code: Amtrak: POG

Passengers
- FY 2025: 10,162 (Amtrak)

Services
Preceding station	Amtrak	Following station
Wisconsin Dells toward St. Paul	Borealis	Columbus toward Chicago
Wisconsin Dells toward Seattle or Portland	Empire Builder	Columbus toward Chicago
Former services
Preceding station	Milwaukee Road	Following station
Weyh toward Seattle or Tacoma	Main Line	Wyocena toward Chicago
Terminus	Portage – Horicon	Pardeeville toward Horicon
Poynette toward Madison	Madison – Portage	Terminus
Location

Portage station is an Amtrak intercity train station in Portage, Wisconsin. It is served by two daily round trips of the Borealis and Empire Builder.

The depot is a small square brick structure constructed during the Amtrak era that is located near a Canadian Pacific Kansas City yard office. The office occupies what was formerly the Portage passenger depot, served by the Chicago, Milwaukee, St. Paul and Pacific Railroad (Milwaukee Road) prior to the creation of Amtrak. There are no station staff in Portage.

In October 2011, Lamers Bus Lines began offering a daily stop at the station, with service between Madison and Wausau. This service was transferred to Van Galder Coach USA in 2022.
