= Columbus station =

Train station served by Amtrak in Columbus, Wisconsin, US

Columbus, WI
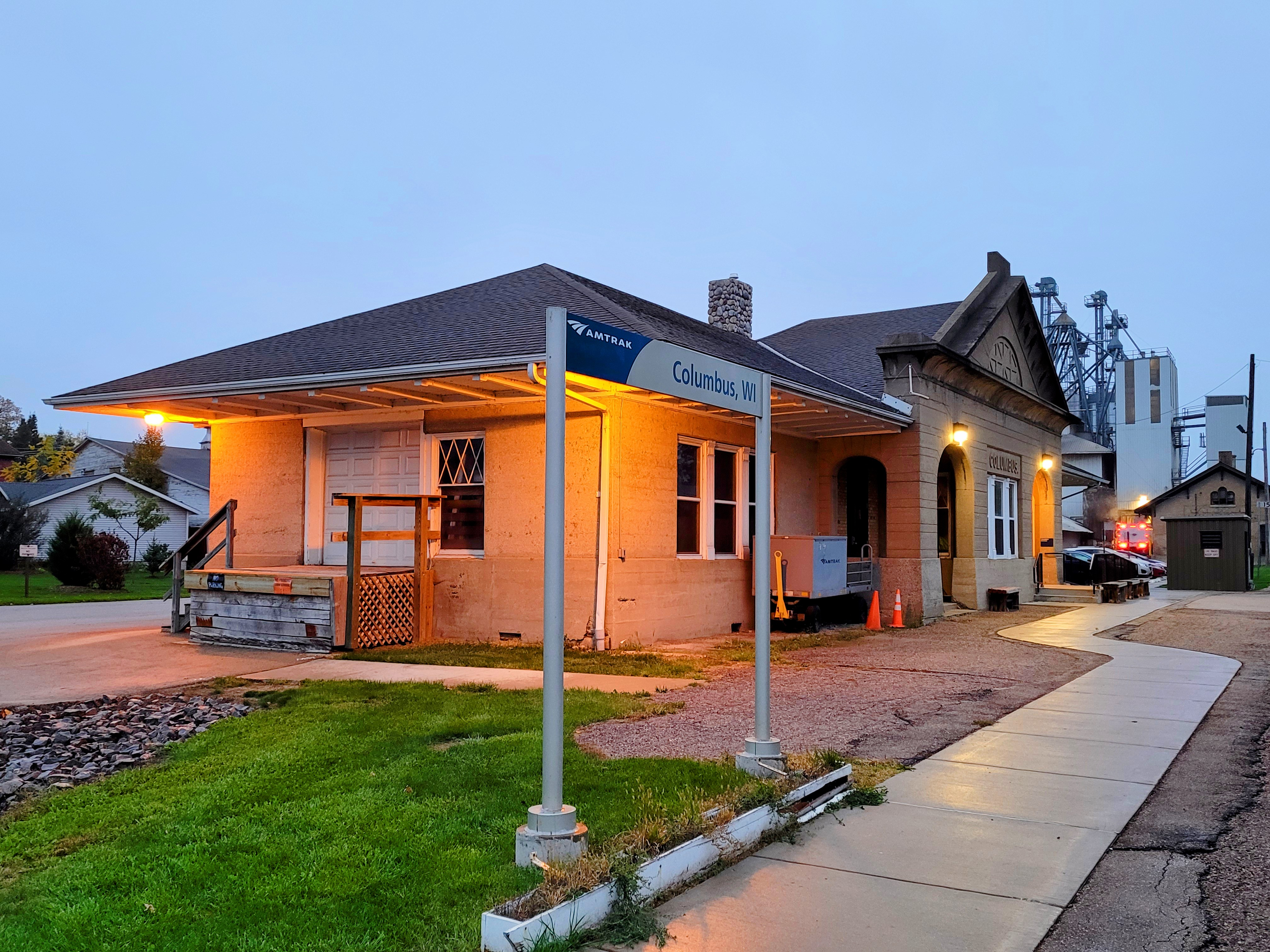

General information
- Location: 359 North Ludington Street; Columbus, Wisconsin; United States
- Coordinates: 43.3408°N 89.0126°W
- Line: CPKC Watertown Subdivision
- Platforms: 2 side platform
- Tracks: 2
- Connections: Van Galder (CoachUSA) marketed via MegaBus

Construction
- Parking: Yes
- Accessible: Yes

Other information
- Station code: Amtrak: CBS

History
- Opened: 1906

Passengers
- FY 2025: 23,504 (Amtrak)

Services
Preceding station	Amtrak	Following station
Portage toward St. Paul	Borealis	Milwaukee toward Chicago
Portage toward Seattle or Portland	Empire Builder	Milwaukee toward Chicago
Former services
Preceding station	Milwaukee Road	Following station
Fall River toward Seattle or Tacoma	Main Line	Astico toward Chicago
Location

Columbus station is an Amtrak train station in Columbus, Wisconsin. It is served by the daily round trips of the Borealis and Empire Builder.

== History ==
Built in 1906 by the Chicago, Milwaukee, St. Paul and Pacific Railroad (Milwaukee Road), the station is well preserved, and looks much as did when first built. The station area also includes an older freight station. In 2016, a safety fence was constructed between the two mainline tracks running by the station.

The station was staffed on weekdays until May 2017, at which time it became unstaffed. Some Amish passengers, who bought their tickets at the ticket window, began using the two staffed stations in the state (Milwaukee and La Crosse) instead.

Borealis service began on May 21, 2024. Construction to upgrade the station's platform area, parking, and other components to meet Americans with Disability Act requirements was commpleted in late 2025.
