= Tomah station =

Train station in Tomah, Wisconsin, USA

Tomah, WI
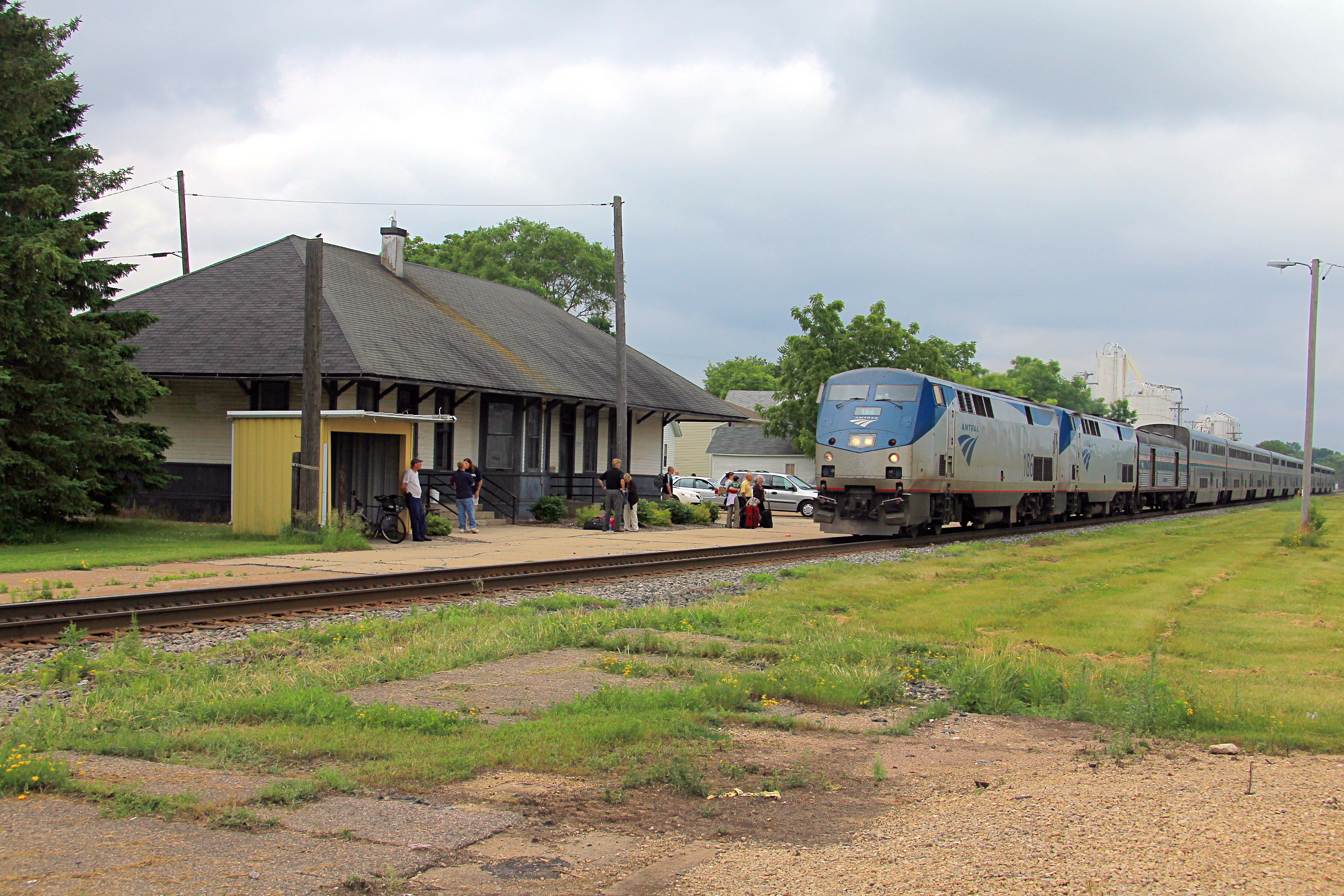
- A Chicago-bound Empire Builder pulling into Tomah station

General information
- Location: N Superior Avenue at Washington Street; Tomah, Wisconsin; United States
- Coordinates: 43.9860°N 90.5055°W
- Line: CPKC Tomah Subdivision
- Platforms: 1 side platform
- Tracks: 1

Construction
- Parking: Yes; free
- Accessible: Yes

Other information
- Station code: Amtrak: TOH

Passengers
- FY 2025: 17,998 (Amtrak)

Services
| Preceding station | Amtrak | Following station |
|---|---|---|
| La Crosse toward St. Paul | Borealis | Wisconsin Dells toward Chicago |
| La Crosse toward Seattle or Portland | Empire Builder | Wisconsin Dells toward Chicago |
Former services
| Preceding station | Milwaukee Road | Following station |
|---|---|---|
| Tunnel City toward Seattle or Tacoma | Main Line | Oakdale toward Chicago |
Location

Tomah station is an Amtrak intercity train station in Tomah, Wisconsin. It is served by the daily round trips of the Borealis and Empire Builder. The station house is a wooden structure that was originally built by the Chicago, Milwaukee, St. Paul and Pacific Railroad around the turn of the 20th century, replacing an earlier depot once located at the Glendale Road crossing. It is not a staffed station, but a caretaker opens and closes the waiting room, which occupies a corner of the original station structure. In late 2025 the station was renovated with a heated, high-level accessible platform, upgrades to the building, improvements to the walkways and parking, and new signage and lighting.
