= Wisconsin Dells station =

Wisconsin Dells, WI
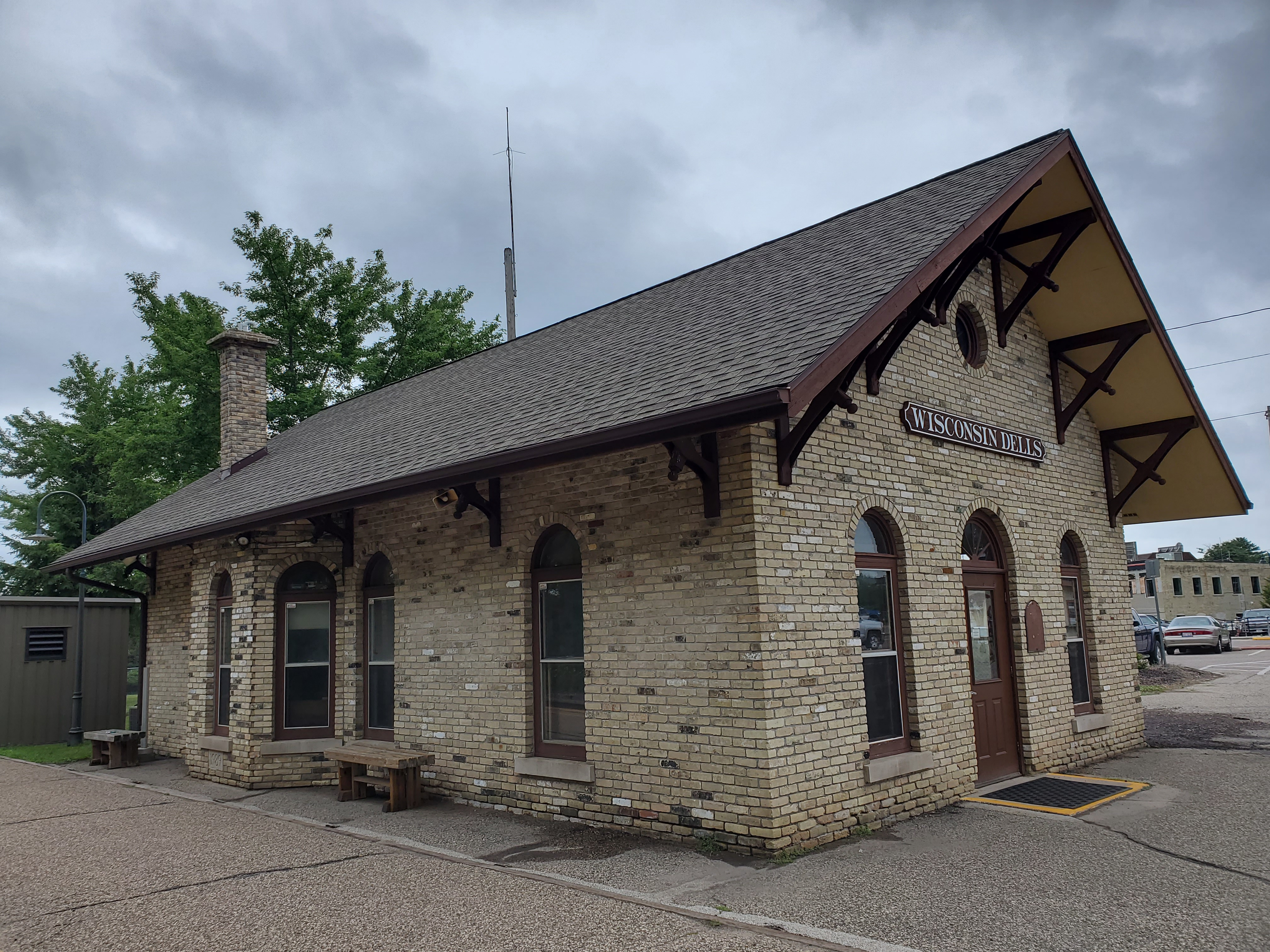
- Image of the station taken on July 15, 2020

General information
- Location: 100 La Crosse Street; Wisconsin Dells, Wisconsin; United States
- Coordinates: 43°37′36″N 89°46′39″W
- Owner: City of Wisconsin Dells
- Line: CPKC Tomah Subdivision
- Platforms: 1 side platform
- Tracks: 1

Construction
- Parking: Yes
- Accessible: Yes

Other information
- Station code: Amtrak: WDL

History
- Opened: 1989

Passengers
- FY 2025: 24,036 (Amtrak)

Services
Preceding station	Amtrak	Following station
Tomah toward St. Paul	Borealis	Portage toward Chicago
Tomah toward Seattle or Portland	Empire Builder	Portage toward Chicago
Former services
Preceding station	Milwaukee Road	Following station
Lyndon toward Seattle or Tacoma	Main Line	Lewiston toward Chicago
Location

Wisconsin Dells station is an Amtrak intercity train station in Wisconsin Dells, Wisconsin. It is served by the daily round trips of the Borealis and Empire Builder. Despite the antiquated appearance, the station was built in 1989. The station is a replica of a former Chicago, Milwaukee, St. Paul and Pacific Railroad (Milwaukee Road) depot, and is in close proximity to a tourist railroad called the Riverside and Great Northern Railway. The previous station on this site was damaged by a Soo Line Railroad freight train derailing in 1982 (although the depot belonged to the Milwaukee Road then; the Soo Line did not merge with the Milwaukee until 1986.) A nonprofit group was created in the town in order to raise funds for the current station building. Borealis service began on May 21, 2024.

Although there is a caretaker who opens and closes the station around train times, there are no Amtrak employees to sell tickets or handle baggage at this station.

In 2021, Amtrak proposed additional rail connections to Madison and Eau Claire by 2035.
