= La Crosse station =

Train station in Wisconsin

La Crosse, WI
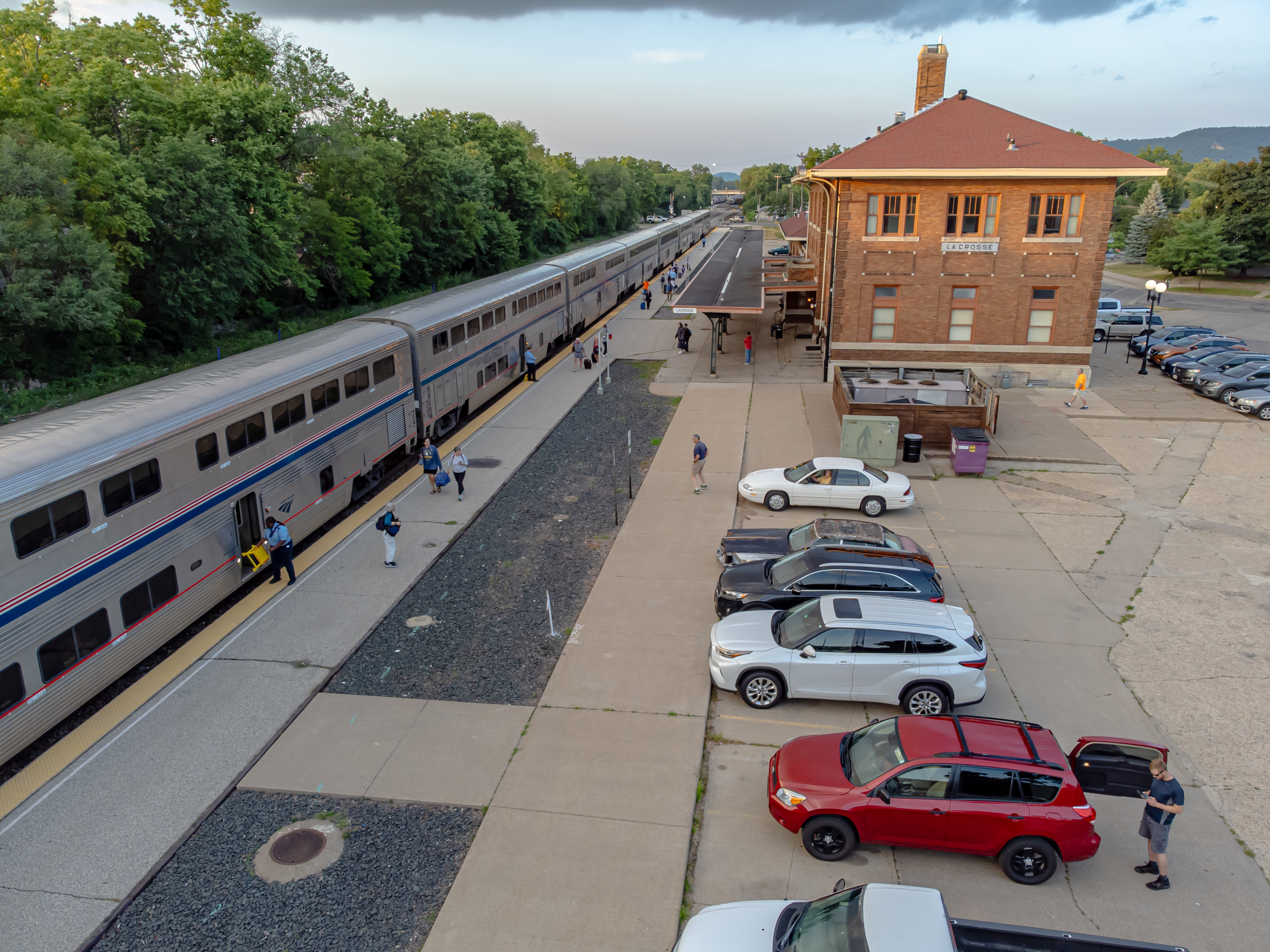
- The westbound Empire Builder at La Crosse station in 2023

General information
- Location: 601 Saint Andrew Street; La Crosse, Wisconsin; United States
- Coordinates: 43°50′00″N 91°14′50″W
- Owner: City of La Crosse
- Line: CPKC Tomah Subdivision
- Platforms: 1 side platform
- Tracks: 2
- Connections: MTU: 6 SMRT: Yellow

Construction
- Parking: Yes
- Cycle facilities: Yes
- Accessible: Yes

Other information
- Station code: Amtrak: LSE

History
- Opened: 1927
- Rebuilt: 1997

Passengers
- FY 2025: 39,963 (Amtrak)

Services
Preceding station	Amtrak	Following station
Winona toward St. Paul	Borealis	Tomah toward Chicago
Winona toward Seattle or Portland	Empire Builder	Tomah toward Chicago
Former services
Preceding station	Amtrak	Following station
Winona toward Seattle	North Coast Hiawatha 1971-1979	Tomah toward Chicago
Winona toward Duluth	North Star 1978-1981	Tomah toward Chicago or Saint Paul–Midway
Preceding station	Milwaukee Road	Following station
Bridge Switch toward Seattle or Tacoma	Main Line	West Salem toward Chicago
Bridge Switch toward Wessington Springs	Wessington Springs – La Crosse	Terminus
Bridge Switch toward Savanna	Savanna – La Crosse	Terminus
- Chicago, Milwaukee and Saint Paul Railway Passenger Depot
- U.S. National Register of Historic Places
- Interactive map of Chicago, Milwaukee and Saint Paul Railway Passenger Depot
- Area: 2 acres (0.81 ha)
- Built: 1926–27
- Architect: A. O. Lagerstrom
- NRHP reference No.: 97001512
- Added to NRHP: December 1, 1997
Location

La Crosse station is an Amtrak intercity train station in La Crosse, Wisconsin, served by the daily Borealis and Empire Builder. The station was built in 1926–27 by the Chicago, Milwaukee, St. Paul, and Pacific Railroad (Milwaukee Road), replacing an older station that burned in 1916. The station was listed on the National Register of Historic Places as the Chicago, Milwaukee and St. Paul Railway Depot and was renovated in 2001.

== History ==
=== Original station ===
The La Crosse and Milwaukee Railroad opened between its namesake cities in 1858, followed by the St. Paul and Milwaukee in 1867. Through mergers, both became part of the Chicago, Milwaukee, St. Paul, and Pacific Railroad (Milwaukee Road) by 1874. The 1858-built station was replaced by in 1878 by the Cameron House, a combined depot and hotel located near downtown La Crosse. By 1910, La Crosse was served by six daily round trips on the Chicago–Milwaukee–Minneapolis corridor (including Chicago–Tacoma and Chicago–Miles City, Montana round trips), two La Crosse–Savanna, Illinois round trips, one La Crosse–Wessington Springs, South Dakota round trip, and one La Crosse–Madison, South Dakota round trip. North La Crosse station, located at the junction of the mainline and the spur to downtown La Crosse, was served by some trips.

=== New station ===
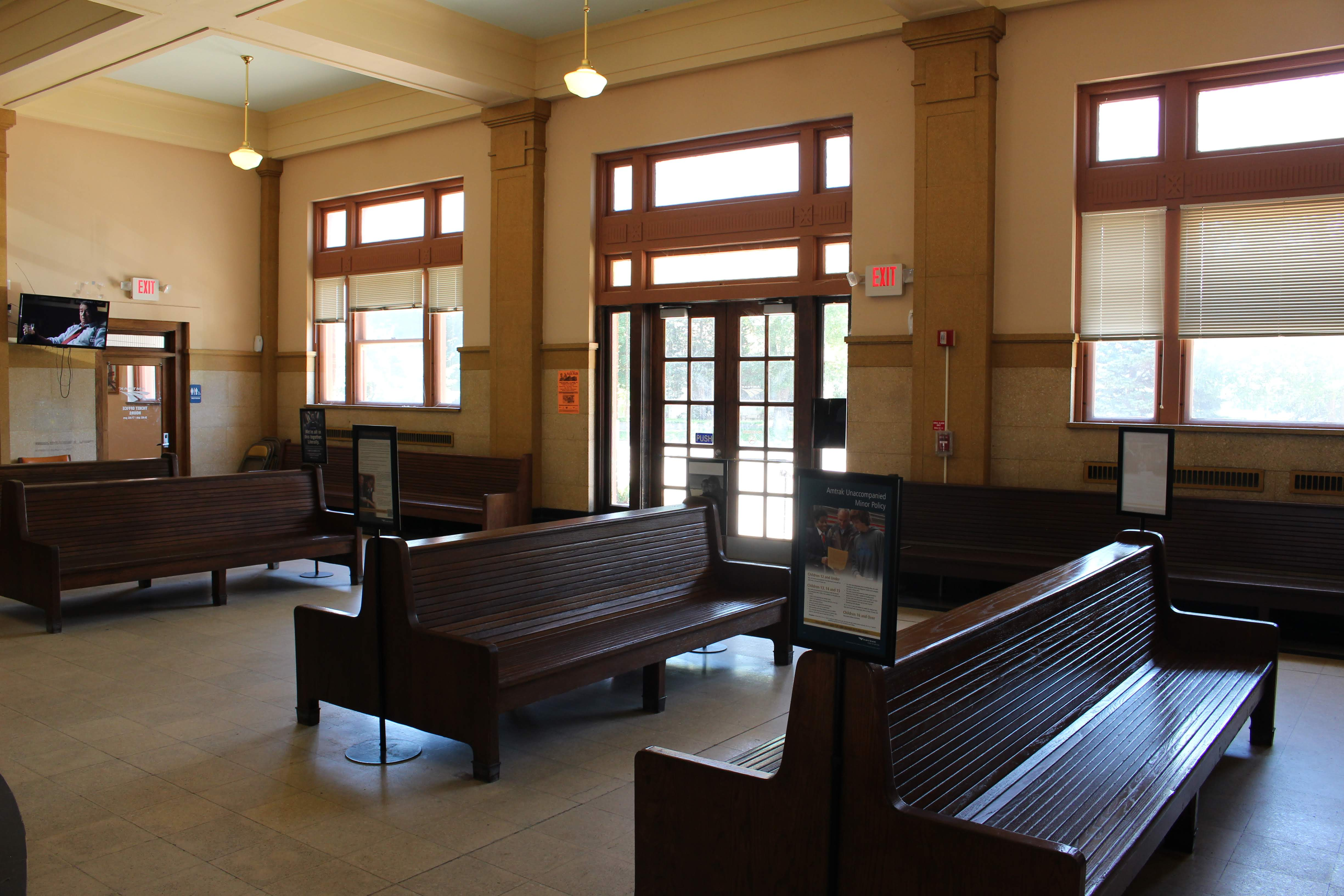
The restored waiting room

The Cameron House station was gutted by fire on December 24, 1916; a temporary station was constructed nearby. A decade of public debate followed about a potential union station to serve all five railroads in La Crosse. The powerful Milwaukee Road insisted on a station in North La Crosse, away from the downtown area, to avoid the time-consuming backup move that crossed busy city streets. In 1925, the Milwaukee Road was given permission to construct its new station in North La Crosse, slightly east of the old North La Crosse station.

Construction began in 1926 and lasted about six months. The station cost $300,000 (equivalent to $4.3 million in 2024), plus $60,000 (equivalent to (equal to $0.9 million) for the acquisition of sixteen lots to make room for the structure. It opened on January 31, 1927. The location on the mainline saved 24 minutes for through trains compared to the downtown location. The Milwaukee Road authorized a taxi company to carry passengers between downtown La Crosse and the station for a flat fee. A downtown freight house remained in use until 1955.

By 1955, the station was served by one daily Chicago–Tacoma round trip (Olympian Hiawatha), three daily Chicago–Minneapolis round trips (Morning Hiawatha, Afternoon Hiawatha, Pioneer Limited, Fast Mail), one daily La Crosse–Austin round trip, and a Minneapolis-to-Chicago local. Over the years, service gradually decreased as subsidies for automobile and air travel cut into the profitability of passenger rail. Service to Austin was eliminated in 1960, and post office mail contracts were cut in 1967. By October 1970, only the daily Morning Hiawatha round trip plus the Minneapolis-to-Chicago Fast Mail served La Crosse.

=== Amtrak era ===
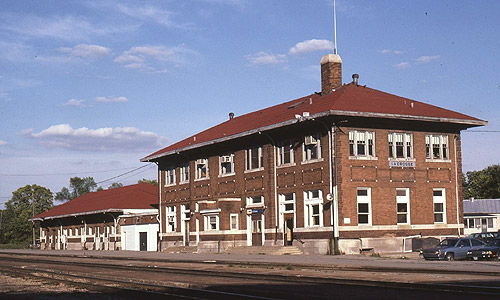
La Crosse station in September 1985

Amtrak took over intercity passenger service on May 1, 1971. Amtrak retained the Burlington Northern Railroad's Empire Builder, but rerouted it between Minneapolis and Chicago, replacing the Morning Hiawatha on a similar schedule. On November 14, 1971, Amtrak added a second daily Chicago–Minneapolis round trip. It ran between Chicago and Seattle three days a week as the North Coast Hiawatha, and between Chicago and Minneapolis the other four days as the Hiawatha. The Hiawatha was renamed Twin Cities Hiawatha on January 16, 1972, but returned to Hiawatha on October 29; it shared the North Coast Hiawatha name beginning in 1974.

The Empire Builder and North Coast Hiawatha were combined east of Minneapolis in 1977, with the Twin Cities Hiawatha operating daily. On April 30, 1978, the Arrowhead and Twin Cities Hiawatha were merged to form the Chicago–Duluth North Star. The North Coast Hiawatha was discontinued on October 6, 1979, though the Empire Builder continued to run. The North Star was cut back to a Minneapolis–Duluth service in October 1981, leaving only the daily Empire Builder serving La Crosse. The station was listed on the National Register of Historic Places in 1997. A renovation that included an accessible platform was completed in 2001.

Borealis service began on May 21, 2024. As part of the agreement to start Borealis service, a new track will be added in the station area and the platform will be reconstructed closer to the station. As of early 2024, there were two tracks by the station, one mainline track next to the platform and one lead track for the yard northeast of the station. The new configuration will have two mainline tracks plus the yard lead. Construction for the new platform and other ADA upgrades to the station are planned to be complete in Amtrak's fiscal year 2026 (after October 1, 2025).
