= Winona Transit Service =

Provider of mass transportation in Winona County, Minnesota

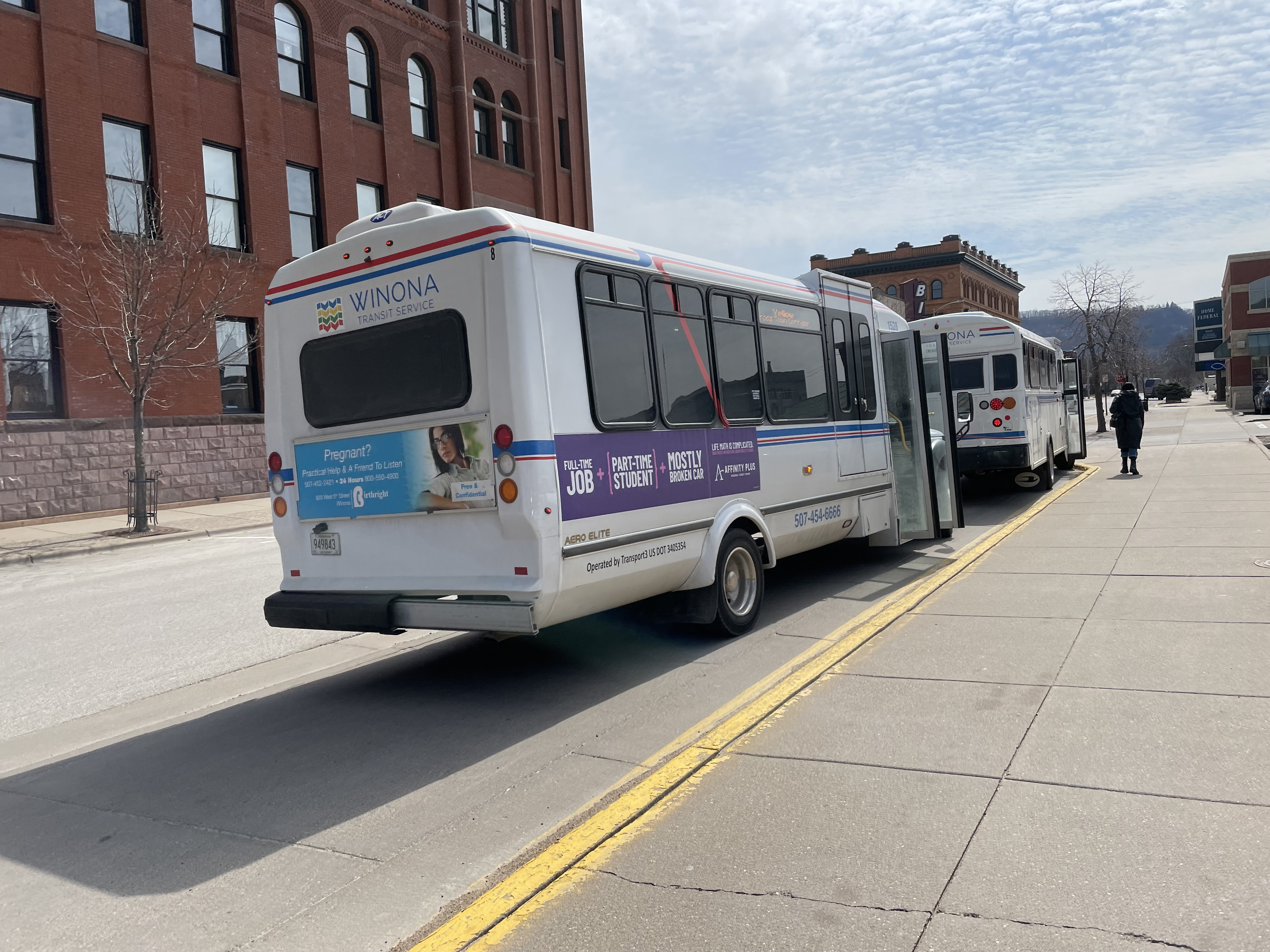
- Winona Transit Services buses at the downtown transfer point
- Parent: City of Winona
- Locale: Winona, Minnesota
- Service area: Winona County, Minnesota
- Service type: Bus service, paratransit
- Routes: 4
- Fleet: 7 buses
- Annual ridership: 225,350 (2019)
- Website: Winona Transit Service

Winona Transit Service is the primary provider of mass transportation in Winona County, Minnesota with routes serving the Winona area. As of 2019, the system provided 225,350 rides over 17,171 annual vehicle revenue hours with 7 buses and 1 demand response vehicle.

== History ==
Public transit in the Winona area began in the form of horse cars starting in 1883, operated by the Winona City Railway Co. In 1892, the horse cars were replaced by electric streetcars, which in turn were replaced with buses in 1938.

Buses were fare-free for much of 2020, due to the COVID-19 pandemic. In 2021, the bus routes were redesigned, while fares for dial-a-ride service were increased. Benches at the downtown transfer hub were removed in 2023, due to littering and other issues. The small shelter is planned to be replaced with a standard bus shelter.

== Service ==
Winona Transit Service operates four routes. Two routes begin at the transfer hub situated on 3rd Street and Center Street, while there is one east and one west route that connect with each of those routes. Hours of operation for regular routes are Monday through Friday from 6:00 A.M. to 6:15 P.M. Saturday service runs from 9:00 A.M. to 5:00 P.M. There is no Sunday service. As of 2023, single fares are set at $1.25.

Connections to intercity public transit are available via Jefferson Lines buses and Amtrak's Empire Builder and Borealis trains.

== Fixed Route Ridership ==
The ridership statistics shown here are of fixed route services only and do not include demand response.

== See also ==
- Winona station
- Rochester Public Transit
- La Crosse MTU
