= Borealis (train) =

Amtrak inter-city rail service

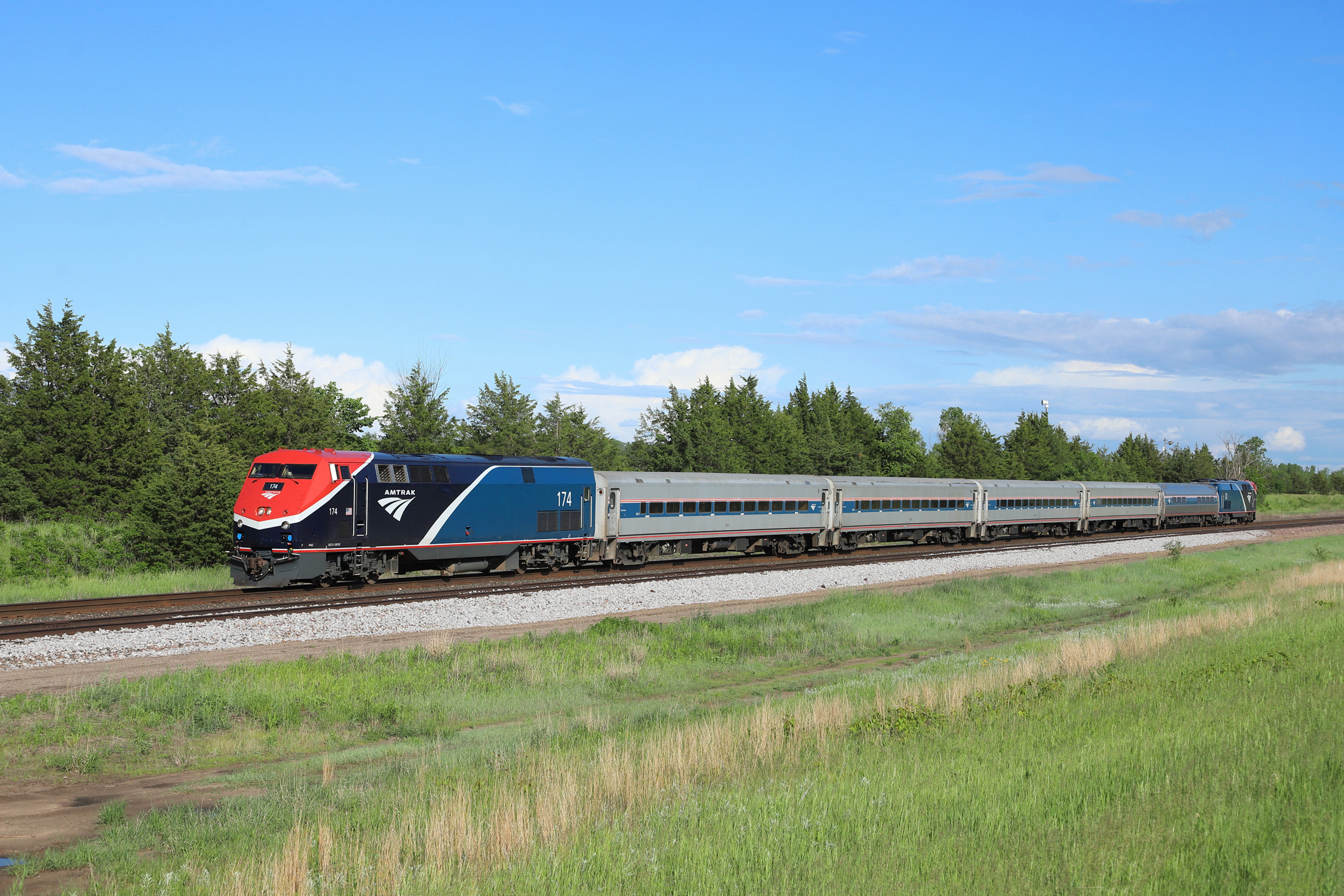
- Borealis near Welch Township, May 2024

Overview
- Service type: Inter-city rail
- Status: Operating
- Locale: Midwestern United States
- Predecessor: Twin Cities Hiawatha, North Coast Hiawatha
- First service: May 21, 2024
- Current operator: Amtrak
- Annual ridership: 212,909 (FY 25) ▲140.7% (Note: Amtrak's Fiscal Year (FY) runs from October 1 of the prior year to September 30 of the named year.)

Route
- Termini: Chicago, Illinois; Saint Paul, Minnesota
- Stops: 11
- Distance travelled: 411 mi (661 km)
- Average journey time: 7 hours, 24 minutes
- Service frequency: Once daily
- Train numbers: 1333 (westbound), 1340 (eastbound)

On-board services
- Class: Coach
- Disabled access: Yes
- Catering facilities: Café
- Baggage facilities: Overhead racks

Technical
- Rolling stock: GE Genesis; Siemens Charger; GE Dash 8-32BWH; Superliner
- Track gauge: 4 ft 8 1/2 in (1,435 mm) standard gauge
- Operating speed: 54 mph (87 km/h) (avg.); 79 mph (127 km/h) (top)
- Track owners: CPKC, Metra

The Borealis, referred to as Twin Cities–Milwaukee–Chicago (TCMC) during planning, is an Amtrak inter-city rail service that operates daily between Chicago, Illinois, and Saint Paul, Minnesota, via Milwaukee, Wisconsin. Service began on May 21, 2024, under the Amtrak Midwest brand.

The train supplements the long-distance Empire Builder, serving the same stations but with higher reliability and complementary departure times. As an extension of an existing Chicago–Milwaukee Hiawatha train, the Borealis doubled Amtrak service frequency between Milwaukee and Saint Paul. Total ridership in its first year of service was 205,800 passengers, contributing to substantial growth in overall ridership on the Chicago-Twin Cities corridor.

== History ==
=== Previous services ===
Prior to Amtrak, private railroads ran passenger service between the Twin Cities and Chicago on several corridors. The Chicago and North Western Railway (C&NW) operated Twin Cities–Chicago trains via Madison until the late 1950s, and via Milwaukee until the Twin Cities 400 was discontinued on July 23, 1963. The Milwaukee Road ran all its Twin Cities–Chicago trains via Milwaukee; by 1971, all that remained of the railroad's Twin Cities service was the daily Morning Hiawatha plus the eastbound Fast Mail. The Chicago, Burlington and Quincy Railroad (CB&Q) operated a more westerly Twin Cities–Chicago route via Savanna, Illinois. It merged into the Burlington Northern Railroad (BN) in 1970; by 1971, the BN offered three daily Twin Cities–Chicago round trips on the Morning Zephyr, Afternoon Zephyr, Empire Builder, and North Coast Limited.

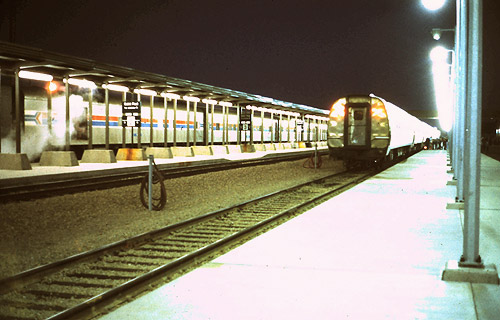
The North Coast Hiawatha (left) and North Star at Midway station in St. Paul in 1978

Amtrak took over most intercity passenger rail service in the United States on May 1, 1971, keeping only half of existing service. The only Twin Cities–Chicago service that remained was the Empire Builder, which was rerouted over the Milwaukee Road between the Twin Cities and Chicago in order to serve Milwaukee. The tri-weekly North Coast Hiawatha began operating on June 14, 1971; it was combined with the Empire Builder between Minneapolis and Chicago. The North Coast Hiawatha began operating separately east of Minneapolis on November 14, 1971. A new Minneapolis–Chicago train, the Hiawatha, ran quad-weekly on days the North Coast Hiawatha did not operate; this provided two daily round trips between Minneapolis and Chicago.

The Minneapolis–Chicago train was renamed Twin Cities Hiawatha on January 16, 1972, but returned to Hiawatha on October 29, 1972. The North Coast Hiawatha ran daily during the summers of 1974 to 1977, and the separate Hiawatha did not operate. Twin Cities–Chicago service was temporarily reduced to one daily round trip on September 8, 1977, with the Empire Builder operating quad-weekly and the North Coast Hiawatha operating tri-weekly. On October 30, 1977, the two trains were changed to an overnight schedule between Minneapolis and Chicago, with the daily Twin Cities Hiawatha operating on a daytime schedule on the corridor.

On April 30, 1978, the Empire Builder and North Coast Hiawatha resumed their former schedules. The Twin Cities Hiawatha was moved to the overnight schedule and through-routed with the Twin Cities–Duluth Arrowhead to form the North Star. The North Coast Hiawatha was discontinued in October 1979, while the Empire Builder became tri-weekly until 1982. The North Star was discontinued on April 7, 1985; Twin Cities–Chicago service from 1985 to 2024 was only the daily Empire Builder.

=== TCMC project ===
The TCMC project began in 2015 after the conclusion of a feasibility report by Amtrak. Based on the favorable ridership and revenue projections MnDOT led a Phase 1 study in cooperation with WisDOT, IDOT, the Ramsey County Regional Railroad Authority and the FRA to analyze service alternatives, infrastructure upgrades and anticipated costs. The Phase 2 study was led by WisDOT to complete the environmental review and prepare a Service Development Plan. Schedule delays from Seattle to St. Paul were cited as part of the interest in having a reliable departure time from St. Paul.

Infrastructure upgrades for the project were required in La Crosse, La Crescent, Winona and St. Paul. The total capital cost was $53.3 million, which was fully funded by federal grants, WisDOT and MnDOT. The project was scheduled to begin construction in 2023 and begin operations with one train in 2023. The TCMC service was anticipated to be the first phase of additional Amtrak service across Wisconsin with eventual extensions to Madison and Eau Claire.

In a public meeting on December 1, 2022, an Amtrak representative stated that the service was expected to start by summer 2023 with the name Great River, after the Mississippi River (Misi-ziibi means "Great River" in Ojibwe). A paper by the Wisconsin Legislature's Legislative Fiscal Bureau, published on June 6, 2023, for the legislature's Joint Committee on Finance, estimated that service would start in September 2023, with related construction to improve service beginning in early 2024 and ending in mid-to-late 2025. However, in fall 2023 the estimated start date of the train slipped to 2024. In December 2023, the FRA accepted the Chicago–La Crosse–St. Paul route into its Corridor Identification and Development Program. The move granted $500,000 toward studying additional frequency on the route, and prioritized the corridor for future federal funding.

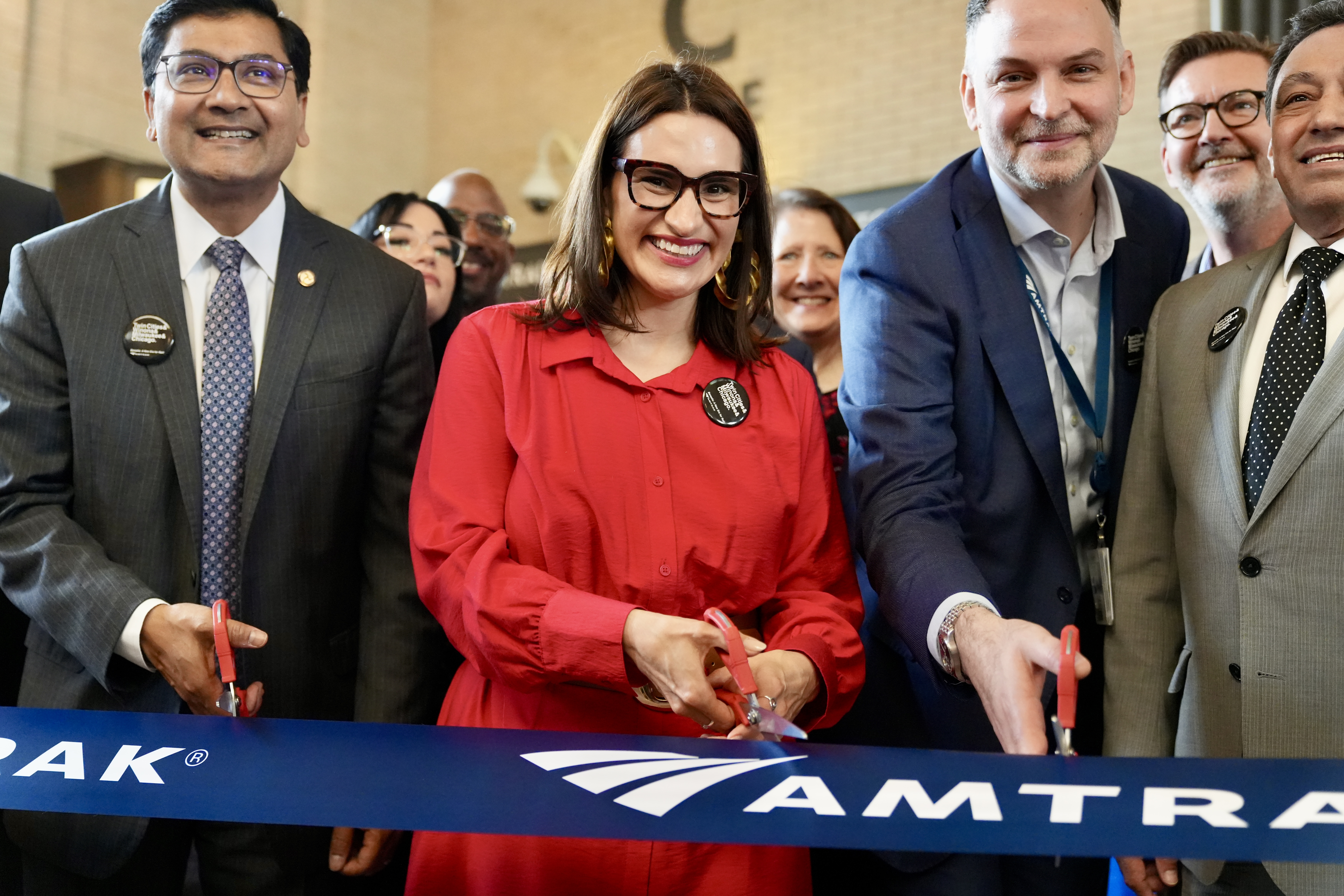
Ribbon cutting for the Amtrak Borealis in Saint Paul, May 2024

In a February 2024 update, WisDOT announced that the service would be named the Borealis instead of the Great River, and that the train would use refurbished Horizon railcars. However, the new name for the service was retracted within 24-hours of its announcement. Amtrak officially announced the train as the Borealis in its press release introducing the train and announcing ticket sales on April 30, 2024. Service began on May 21, 2024. During its first 11 days of operation, the Borealis averaged 604 daily passengers (329 westbound and 275 eastbound). Early demand for the Borealis prompted Amtrak to consider adding a third daily round trip on the corridor.

Ridership was projected to be 124,000 passengers per year. On October 24, 2024, Borealis ridership surpassed 100,000 passengers within five months of service. Total ridership in the first year of service was 205,800 passengers, contributing to overall ridership in the Chicago-Twin Cities corridor more than tripling. In January 2025, Amtrak was awarded a $38.6 million federal grant to fund operation of the Borealis through 2030. In October 2026, the service reached its 500,000th passenger, well beyond pre-launch ridership estimates.

== Operation ==
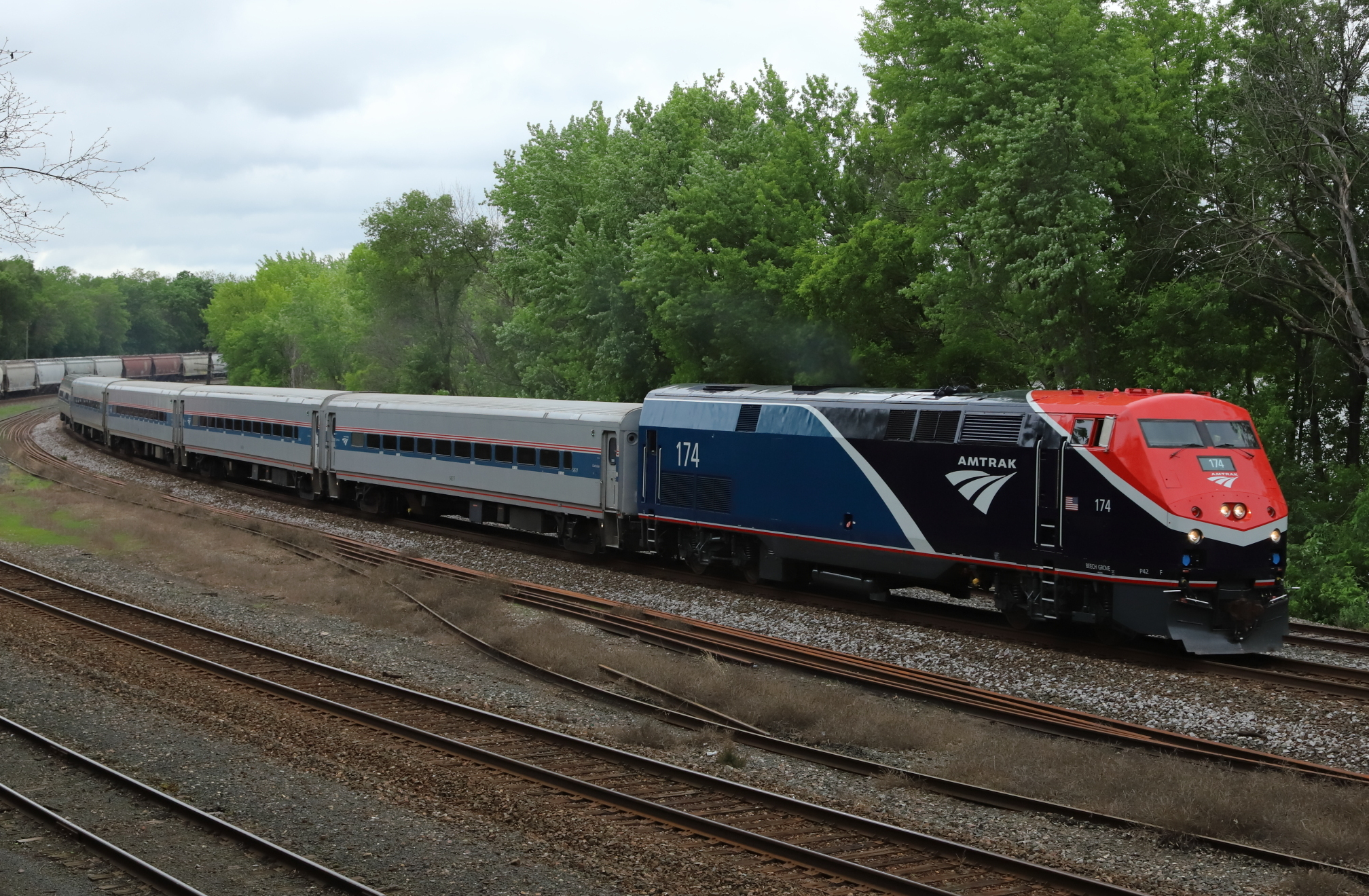
A Borealis train in May 2024

The Borealis has eleven intermediate stops between the two terminals. It is scheduled for 7 hours 24 minutes in each direction, including a five-minute stop in Milwaukee. The train was an extension of an existing Chicago–Milwaukee Hiawatha round trip, renumbered from 333/340 to 1333/1340. Train 1333 departs Chicago at 11:05 am and arrives in St. Paul at 6:29 pm, while Train 1340 departs St. Paul at 11:50 am and arrives in Chicago at 7:14 pm.

A typical Borealis consist initially had four Horizon Fleet coach class cars and one Amfleet cafe/business class car. One or two GE Genesis or Siemens Chargers diesel locomotives are used. Superliners replaced the Horizon and Amfleet coaches in March 2025 after Amtrak removed the entire Horizon fleet from service due to corrosion issues. This ended business-class service on the route, as the Superliners do not offer business class. In October 2026, following strong ridership demand, Amtrak announced that a fourth passenger car will be re-added to the Borealis.

An extension of the route to Target Field station in Minneapolis, Fridley, and St. Cloud has been considered. Through the federal Corridor ID Program, a second Chicago–Twin Cities route that includes Madison and Eau Claire is being studied.

== Route and stops ==
State	Town/City	Station	Connections
Illinois	Chicago	Chicago Union	Amtrak (long-distance): California Zephyr, Cardinal, City of New Orleans, Empire Builder, Floridian, Lake Shore Limited, Southwest Chief, Texas Eagle; Amtrak (intercity): Blue Water, Hiawatha, Illini and Saluki, Illinois Zephyr and Carl Sandburg, Lincoln Service, Pere Marquette, Wolverine; Amtrak Thruway; Metra: BNSF, Heritage Corridor, Milwaukee District North, Milwaukee District West, North Central Service, SouthWest Service; Chicago "L": Blue (at Clinton) Brown Orange Pink Purple (at Quincy); Intercity bus: Greyhound Lines, Megabus; CTA, Pace
Illinois	Glenview	Glenview	Amtrak: Empire Builder, Hiawatha; Metra: Milwaukee District North; Pace
Wisconsin	Sturtevant	Sturtevant	Amtrak: Hiawatha; Ryde
Wisconsin	Milwaukee	Milwaukee Airport	Amtrak: Hiawatha; Shuttle to Milwaukee Mitchell International Airport
Wisconsin	Milwaukee	Milwaukee	Amtrak: Empire Builder, Hiawatha; Amtrak Thruway; The Hop; Intercity bus: Greyhound Lines, Indian Trails, Jefferson Lines, Lamers Bus Lines, Megabus, Wisconsin Coach Lines
Wisconsin	Columbus	Columbus	Amtrak: Empire Builder; Van Galder
Wisconsin	Portage	Portage	Amtrak: Empire Builder; Van Galder
Wisconsin	Wisconsin Dells	Wisconsin Dells	Amtrak: Empire Builder
Wisconsin	Tomah	Tomah	Amtrak: Empire Builder
Wisconsin	La Crosse	La Crosse	Amtrak: Empire Builder; Wisconsin Coach Lines; La Crosse MTU, SMRT
Minnesota	Winona	Winona	Amtrak: Empire Builder; Winona Transit Service
Minnesota	Red Wing	Red Wing	Amtrak: Empire Builder
Minnesota	St. Paul	Saint Paul	Amtrak: Empire Builder; Amtrak Thruway; Intercity bus: Greyhound Lines, Jefferson Lines, Megabus; Green Line; Metro Bus, Minnesota Valley Transit Authority
