= Empire Builder =

Northern U.S. rail service

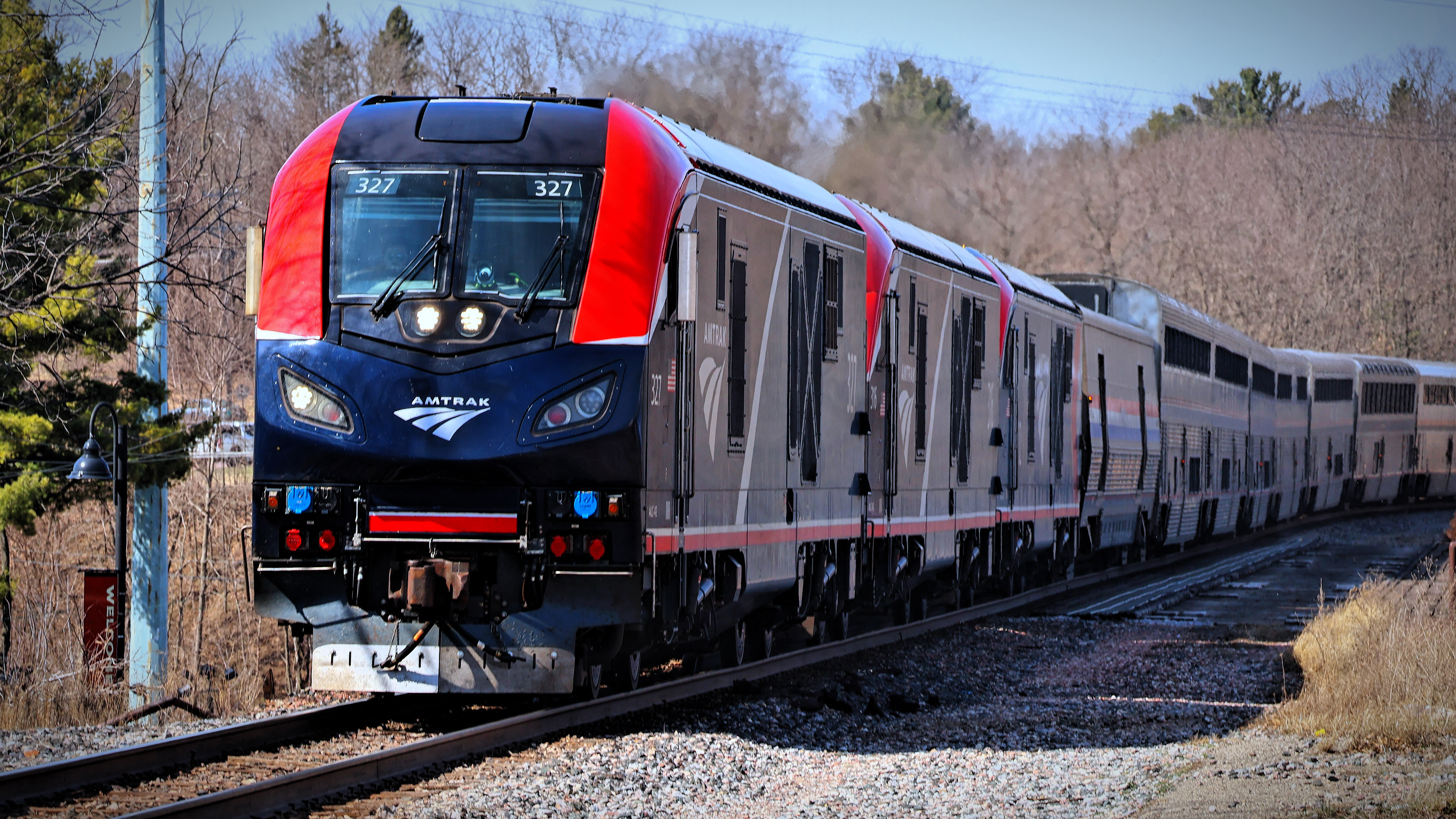
- The Empire Builder in Wisconsin Dells, Wisconsin, March 2026.

Overview
- Service type: Inter-city rail
- Locale: Midwestern and Northwestern United States
- First service: June 10, 1929
- Current operator: Amtrak
- Former operators: Great Northern (1929–1970); Burlington Northern (1970–1971)
- Annual ridership: 364,495 (FY 25) ▼ -6% (Note: Amtrak's Fiscal Year (FY) runs from October 1 of the prior year to September 30 of the named year.)

Route
- Termini: Chicago, Illinois; Seattle, Washington or Portland, Oregon
- Stops: 38 (Seattle–Chicago); 37 (Portland–Chicago)
- Distance travelled: 2,206 miles (3,550 km) (Seattle–Chicago); 2,257 miles (3,632 km) (Portland–Chicago)
- Average journey time: 45 hours, 10 minutes (Portland to Chicago); 45 hours, 15 minutes (Seattle to Chicago); 45 hours, 55 minutes (Chicago to Portland); 46 hours, 10 minutes (Chicago to Seattle)
- Service frequency: Daily
- Train numbers: 7, 8 (Seattle–Chicago); 27, 28 (Portland–Chicago)

On-board services
- Classes: Coach Class; First Class Sleeper Service
- Disabled access: Train lower level, all stations
- Sleeping arrangements: Roomette (2 beds); Bedroom (2 beds); Bedroom Suite (4 beds); Accessible Bedroom (2 beds); Family Bedroom (4 beds)
- Catering facilities: Dining car, Café
- Observation facilities: Sightseer lounge car
- Baggage facilities: Overhead racks, checked baggage available at selected stations

Technical
- Rolling stock: Siemens ALC-42 or GE Genesis locomotives Superliner
- Track gauge: 4 ft 8 1/2 in (1,435 mm) standard gauge
- Operating speed: 50 mph (80 km/h) (avg.); 79 mph (127 km/h) (top)
- Track owners: BNSF, CPKC, Metra, MNNR

The Empire Builder is a daily long-distance passenger train operated by Amtrak between Chicago and either Seattle or Portland via two sections west of Spokane. Introduced in 1929, it was the flagship passenger train of the Great Northern Railway and was retained by Amtrak when it took over intercity rail service in 1971.

The end-to-end travel time of the route is 45–46 hours for an average speed of about 50 mph (80 km/h), though the train travels as fast as 79 mph (127 km/h) over the majority of the route. It is Amtrak's busiest long-distance route.

During fiscal year 2023, the Empire Builder carried 338,993 passengers, an increase of 15.0% from FY2022 but 21.8% below pre-COVID-19 levels (433,372 passengers during FY2019). During FY2022, the train had a total revenue of $49,600,000.

== History ==
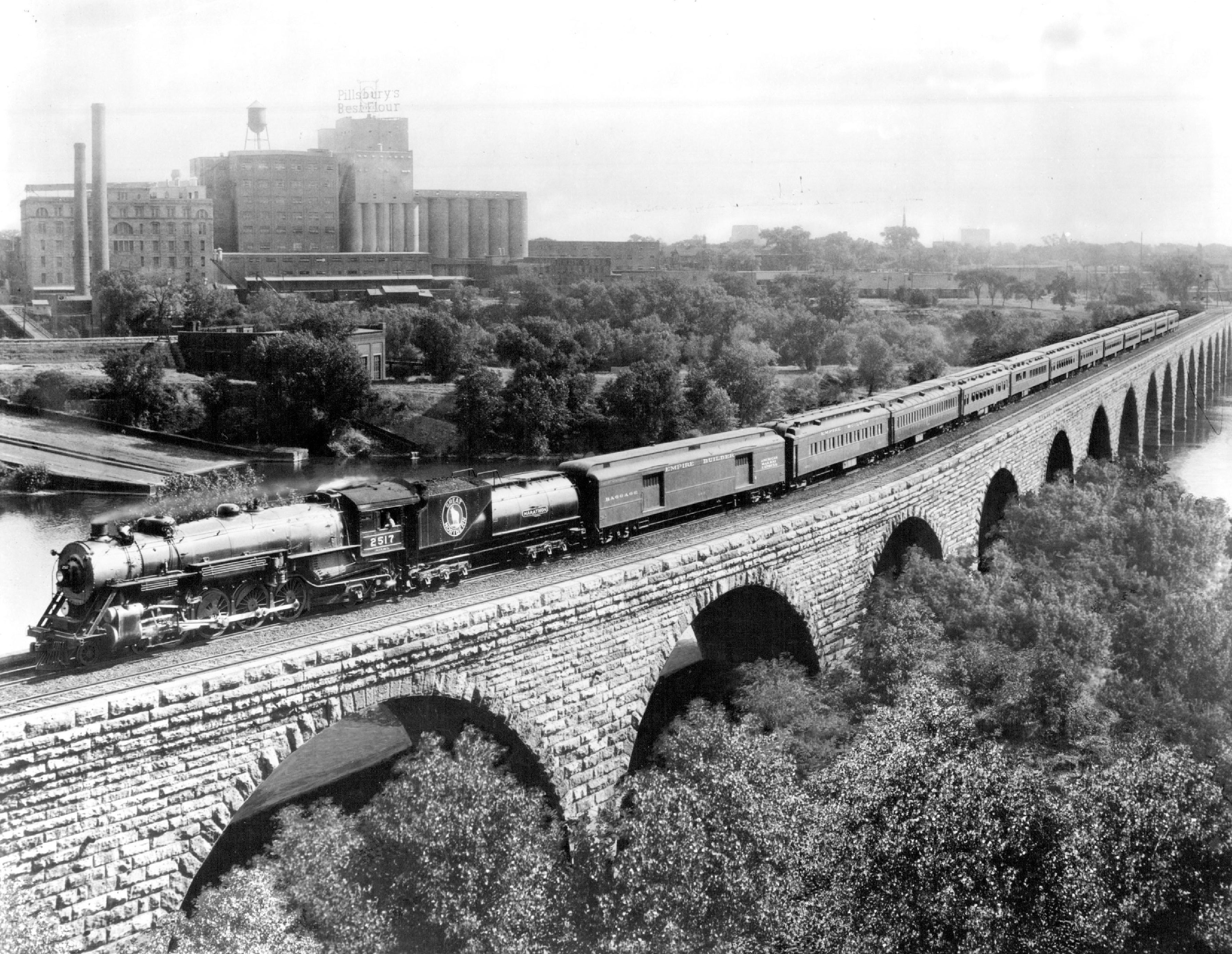
Empire Builder on the Stone Arch Bridge, Minneapolis, c. 1929

The Great Northern Railway inaugurated the Empire Builder on June 10, 1929. It was named in honor of the company's founder, James J. Hill, who had reorganized several failing railroads into the only successful attempt at a privately funded transcontinental railroad. It reached the Pacific Northwest in the late 19th century, and for this feat, he was nicknamed "The Empire Builder". Following World War II, Great Northern placed new streamlined and diesel-powered trains in service that cut the scheduled 2,211-mile trip between Chicago and Seattle from 58.5 hours to 45 hours.

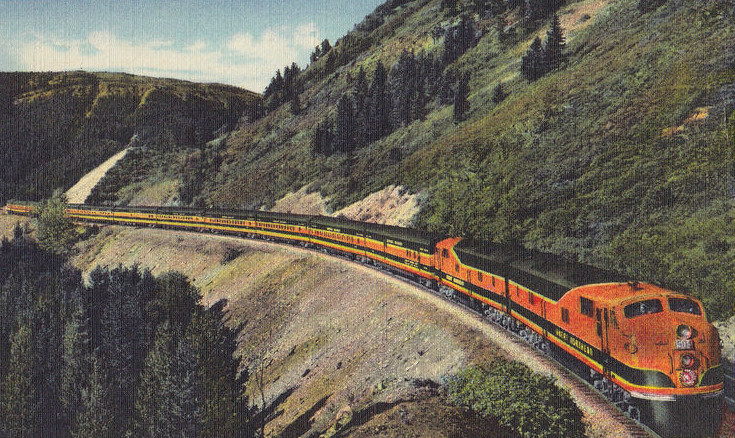
Empire Builder traveling through Glacier National Park, Montana. (1947)

The schedule allowed riders views of the Cascade Mountains and Glacier National Park, a park established through the lobbying efforts of the Great Northern. Re-equipped with domes in 1955, the Empire Builder offered passengers sweeping views of the route through three dome coaches and one full-length Great Dome car for first class passengers.

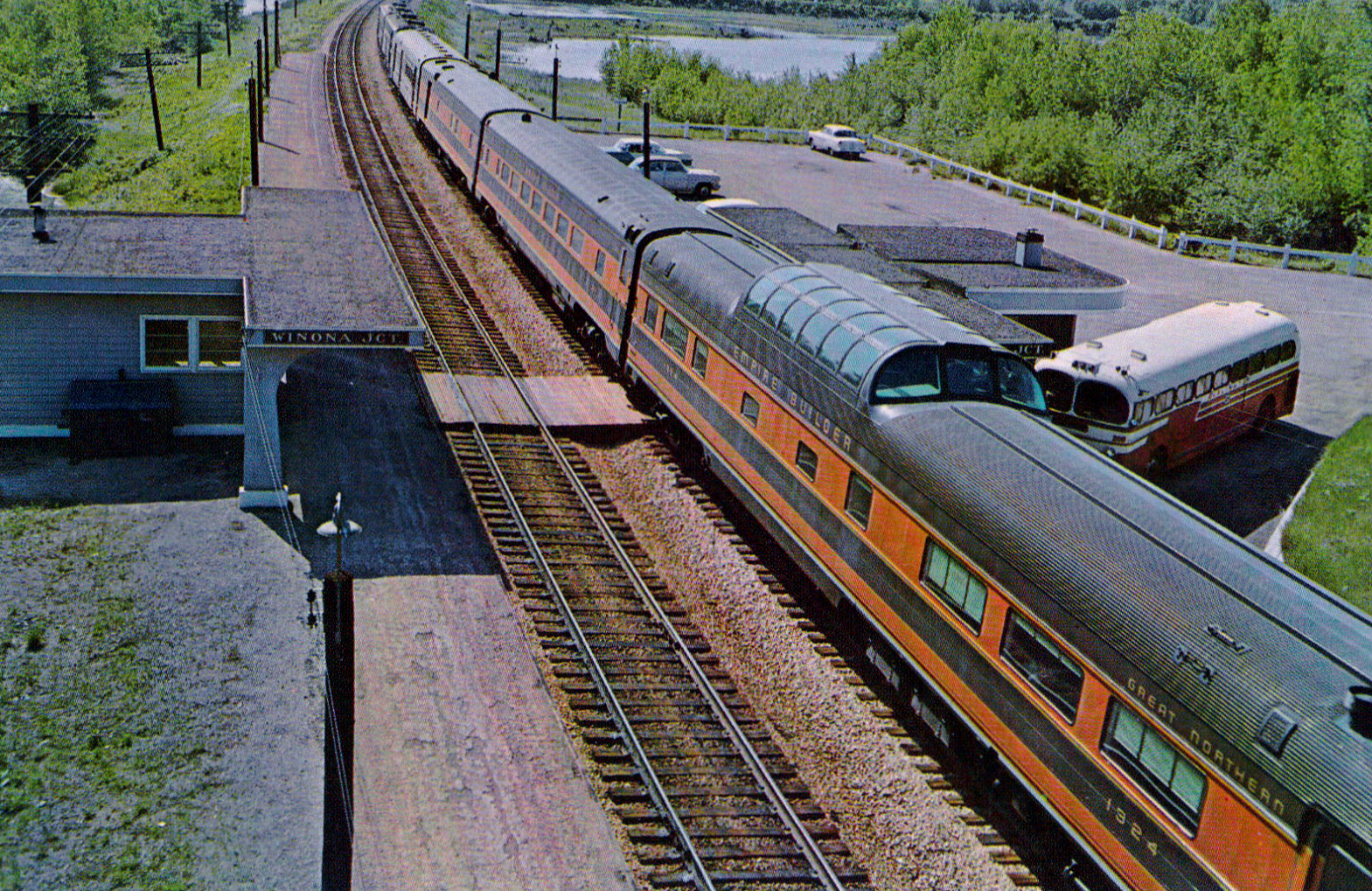
The train at Winona Junction, Wisconsin, in 1958

In March 1970, the Great Northern, along with three other closely affiliated railroads (Chicago, Burlington & Quincy (CB&Q), Northern Pacific and Spokane, Portland & Seattle) merged to form Burlington Northern. BN took over operations of both the Builder and its companion train, the Western Star, as well as the North Coast Limited, which ran between the Twin Cities and Spokane on the former NP’s parallel route through Bismarck, Mandan, Billings, Bozeman, Missoula, and Helena. BN transferred the operation of its long-distance trains to Amtrak when the company took over most of the intercity routes in May 1971.

When Amtrak took over operations of the BN services, it chose to continue running the Builder. The company based this decision on several factors, including the overall higher speed of the ex-GN route and better alternate transportation options along the ex-NP route, although the decision to retain only one of the two existing services that ran through the state of Montana sparked outrage among many politicians and the general public in the south of the Big Sky country.

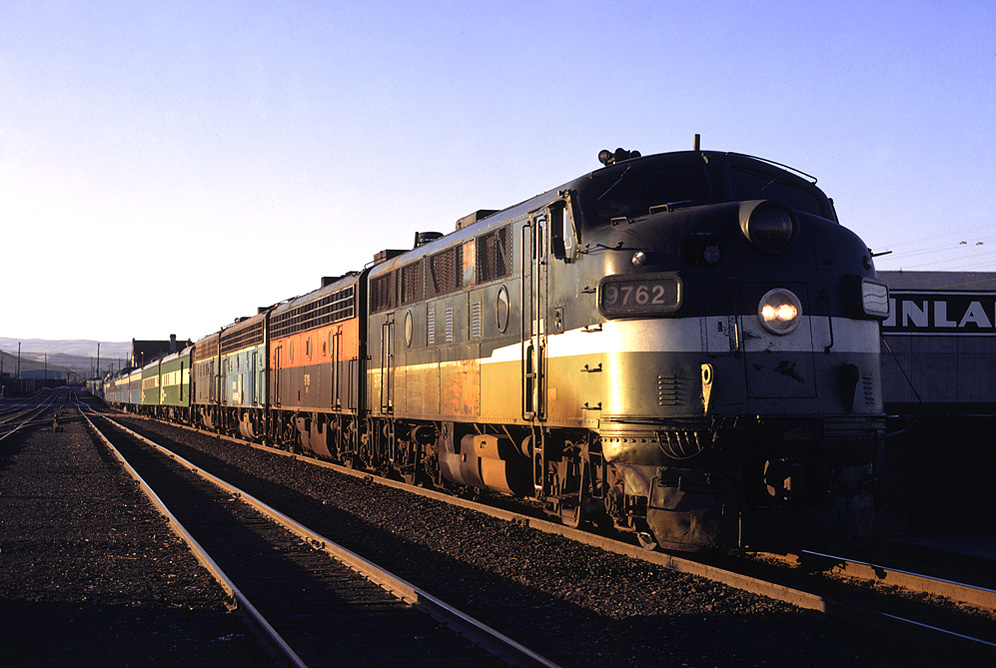
The Empire Builder, coupled with the North Coast Hiawatha (westbound trains were coupled in Spokane), in Yakima, Washington. August 1971.

To improve its farebox recovery ratio, Amtrak rerouted the Chicago–St. Paul leg to run through Milwaukee via the Milwaukee Road. Before 1971, the Chicago–St. Paul leg used the CB&Q's mainline along the Mississippi River through Wisconsin. The service also used to operate west from the Twin Cities before turning northwest in Willmar, to reach Fargo. When Amtrak assumed operation of the service, it also rerouted the Builder over the route between Fargo and Minot via Grand Forks, which until that time was covered by the Builder's companion service, the Western Star. While the Builder running through the direct route between Fargo and Minot, the Western Star continued from Fargo north to Grand Forks, where it turning west to reach Minot.

In the summer of 1974, to coincide with the Expo '74 held in Spokane, Amtrak added a third service, the Expo '74, to complement the Builder and North Coast Hiawatha on the segment between Spokane and Seattle. This was the only time Amtrak provided a three-times-daily service on a long-distance route outside the Silver corridor (New York to Florida), the highest level seen since Amtrak's formation and unmatched since. Amtrak protested to BN about the long travel times between Spokane and Seattle, claiming that its three services could cover the route in 7.5 hours, compared to the 8.5 hours it took at the time. Privately, Amtrak engineers thought the trip could be done in less than 5 hours.

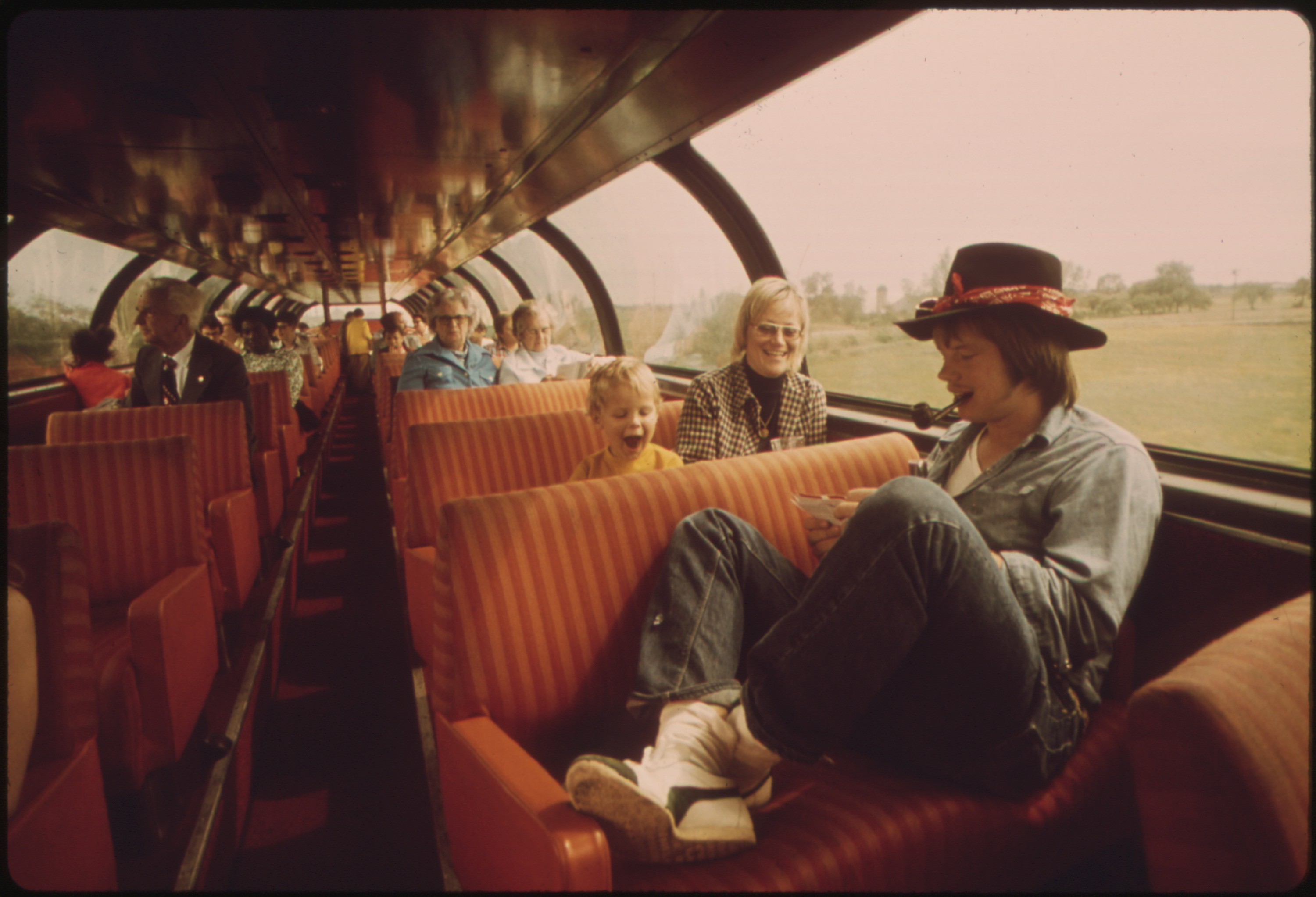
The top level of a Great Dome on the Empire Builder in 1974

Between June 1971 and October 1979, on the parallel route ex Northern Pacific between the Twin Cities and Spokane via Staples, Fargo, Bismarck, Missoula and Helena run the North Coast Hiawatha, descendant of NP's flagship service, the North Coast Limited, which also served stops such as St. Cloud, Staples and Detroit Lakes. Between Chicago and Minneapolis-St. Paul, and between Spokane and Seattle, the North Coast Hiawatha run combined with the Builder three days a week. The joint operation of the Builder and the North Coast Hiawatha was suspended on June 11, 1973, when Amtrak decided that both services should run separately again. This created two daily services between Spokane and Seattle. The North Coast Hiawatha remained on a tri-weekly schedule west of the Twin Cities.

When Amtrak cancelled the North Coast Hiawatha, it rerouted the Builder over the ex-NP mainline between Minneapolis-St. Paul and Fargo to continue to serve St. Cloud, Staples and Detroit Lakes, which otherwise would have lost service with the cancellation of the North Coast Hiawatha. However, the rerouting of the Builder from the GN mainline to the NP mainline however resulted in the loss of the stops at Willmar, Breckenridge and Morris.

In October 1979, the Builder was the first of Amtrak's western long-distance services to receive the new Superliner I cars built by Pullman-Standard. Due to the harsh winter weather of the Upper Midwest plains, and the mountainous areas of Montana, Idaho and Washington, with blizzards and cold temperatures, traditional steam-heated equipment frequently broke down, often forcing Amtrak to cancel service. The Superliners, with their electrical head-end power, were far better suited for the conditions. Amtrak's new national timetable depicted a Superliner coach on the front cover, and the listing for the Empire Builder carried a heading which read "Amtrak's Superliner is Somethin' Special."

Amtrak added a Portland section in 1981, with the train splitting in Spokane. This restored service to the line previously operated by the Spokane, Portland and Seattle Railway. It was not the first time that the train had operated Seattle and Portland sections; Great Northern had split the Builder in Spokane for much of the 1940s and 1950s.

In 2005, Amtrak upgraded service to include a wine and cheese tasting in the dining car for sleeping car passengers and free newspapers in the morning. Amtrak's inspector general eliminated some of these services in 2013 as part of a cost-saving measure.

During summer months, on portions of the route, "Trails and Rails" volunteer tour guides in the lounge car give commentary on points of visual and historic interest that can be viewed from the train.

After running daily for the better part of a century, the Empire Builder was cut back to tri-weekly operation along with most of Amtrak's other long-distance routes on October 12, 2020, as part of a round of service reductions due to the COVID-19 pandemic. For most of the fall and winter of 2020–21, trains departed Chicago on Mondays, Thursdays and Saturdays and departed Seattle or Portland on Tuesdays, Thursdays and Saturdays. However, in March 2021, Amtrak announced the train would return to its pre-pandemic daily schedule on May 24, 2021.

=== Notable incidents ===
On May 27, 1931, the eastbound Empire Builder was struck by a tornado in Clay County, Minnesota. The train, carrying 117 passengers, had all of its cars, minus the locomotive and coal tender, thrown off the tracks by the tornado, with one car being thrown 80 feet (24 m) off the track. One passenger died, with 57 others injured.

Due to heavy patronage during World War II the Empire Builder ran in two sections, known as First 1 and Second 1. On August 9, 1945, at Michigan, North Dakota, First 1 was stopped to address an overheated journal. It was struck from behind by Second 1 at a speed of 45 mph. The rear car of First 1, a “bobtail” – part observation car and part sleeping berths, was telescoped along practically its entire length by the engine of Second 1, and was demolished. It remains the worst rail disaster in both North Dakota and Great Northern Railway history. Thirty-four passengers died and 303 were injured.

On March 7, 1966, the eastbound Empire Builder collided head-on with the Western Star mail and passenger train going in the opposite direction. This occurred between Chester, Montana and Joplin, Montana, at the west end of the Buelow siding, while Great Northern's then-president John M. Budd was aboard. The two engineers both died in the collision and 79 were injured; 29 of those were hospitalized in what came to be known at the Great Northern Buelow wreck.

The westbound Empire Builder derailed between Joplin, Montana and Chester, Montana (at the east end of the Buelow siding) on September 25, 2021, with three fatalities. The train was at the east end of Buelow siding.

== Ridership ==
The Empire Builder is Amtrak's most popular long-distance train. Over fiscal years 2007–2016, Empire Builder annual ridership averaged 500,000, with a high of 554,266 in FY 2008. Revenue peaked in FY 2013 at $67,394,779. (Note: Compiled from Amtrak's annual ridership and revenue reports.) About 65% of the cost of operating the train is covered by fare revenue, a rate among Amtrak's long-distance trains second only to the specialized East Coast Auto Train.

Traffic by Fiscal Year (October–September)
	Ridership	Change over previous year	Ticket Revenue	Change over previous year
2007	504,977	-	$53,177,760	-
2008	554,266	▲9.76%	$59,461,168	▲11.81%
2009	515,444	▼7.0%	$54,064,861	▼9.07%
2010	533,493	▲3.5%	$58,497,143	▲8.19%
2011	469,167	▼12.05%	$53,773,711	▼8.07%
2012	543,072	▲15.75%	$66,655,153	▲23.95%
2013	536,391	▼1.23%	$67,394,779	▲1.1%
2014	450,932	▼15.93%	$54,545,844	▼19.06%
2015	438,376	▼2.78%	$50,541,140	▼7.34%
2016	454,625	▲3.7%	$51,798,583	▲2.48%
2017	454,000	▼0.13%	$59,000,000	▲13.9%
2018	428,854	▼5.53%	$57,600,000	▼2.37%
2019	433,372	▲1.05%	$57,500,000	▼0.17%
2020	253,486	▼41.5%	$32,400,000	▼43.65%
2021	220,681	▼12.94%	$38,400,000	▲18.52%
2022	303,568	▲37.56%	$49,600,000	▲29.17%
2023	348,993	▲15%	$61,100,000	▲23.19%
2024	387,953	▲11.2%	$63,700,000	▲4.26%

== Route ==
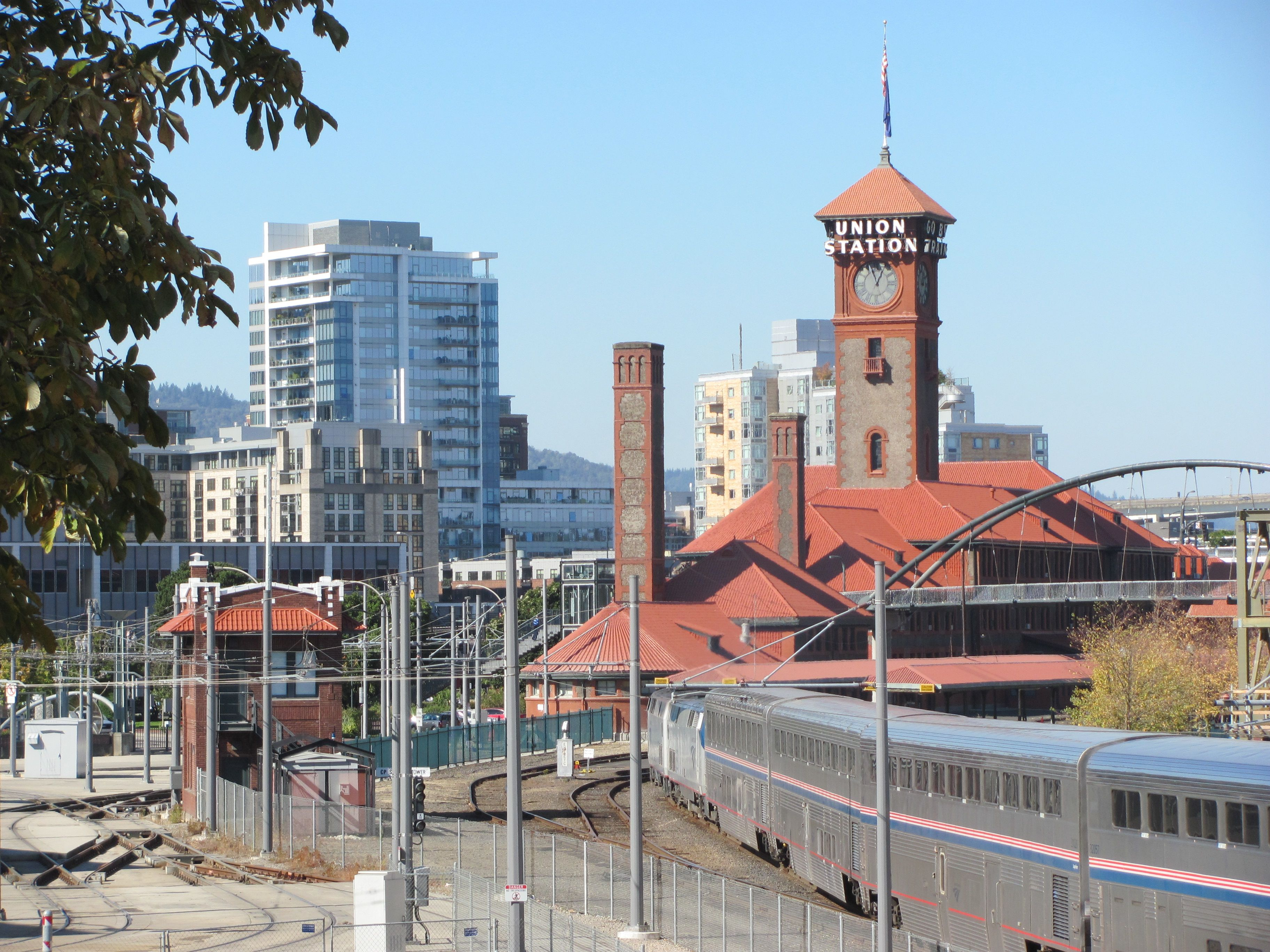
The Portland section of the Empire Builder at Union Station in Portland, Oregon

The current Amtrak Empire Builder passes through Oregon, Washington, Idaho, Montana, North Dakota, Minnesota, Wisconsin, and Illinois. It makes service stops in Spokane, Washington; Havre, Montana; Minot, North Dakota; and Saint Paul, Minnesota. Its other major stops include Vancouver, Washington; Whitefish, Montana; Williston, North Dakota; Fargo, North Dakota; and Milwaukee, Wisconsin. It uses BNSF Railway's Northern Transcon from Seattle to Minneapolis, Minnesota Commercial Railway from Minneapolis to St. Paul, Canadian Pacific Kansas City (former Milwaukee Road) from St. Paul to Rondout, Illinois, and Metra's Milwaukee District North Line (former Milwaukee Road) from Rondout to Chicago. The St. Paul to Chicago portion currently follows the route of the former Twin Cities Hiawatha, and beginning in May 2024 has been supplemented by the Borealis. In pre-Amtrak days it used the Twin Zephyrs routing.

During winter or the rainy season, service cancellations are frequent due to snowfall causing avalanches or landslides in the Cascades and Rockies. BNSF's operational safety policies state that no passenger or freight trains may run through the affected area for 48 hours after an avalanche to ensure that the area has stabilized.

The Seattle section follows Puget Sound and uses the Cascade Tunnel and Stevens Pass as it traverses the Cascade Range to reach Spokane. The Portland section runs along the Washington side of the Columbia River Gorge. The cars from the two sections are combined at Spokane; the Seattle train has the dining car, while the Portland train has the observation car. The combined train then traverses the mountains of northeastern Washington, northern Idaho and northwestern Montana, arriving in Whitefish in the morning. The schedule is timed so that the train passes through the Rocky Mountains (and Glacier National Park) during daylight – an occurrence that is more likely on the eastbound train during summer. Passengers can see sweeping views as the Builder travels along the middle fork of the Flathead River, crossing the Continental Divide at Marias Pass. After crossing Marias Pass, the Empire Builder leaves Glacier National Park and enters the Northern Plains of eastern Montana and North Dakota.

The land changes from prairie to forest as it travels through Minnesota. From Minneapolis-St. Paul, the Empire Builder crosses the Mississippi River at Hastings, Minnesota and passes through southeastern Minnesota cities on or near Lake Pepin before crossing the Mississippi again at La Crosse, Wisconsin. The service travels southeast through rural south-central Wisconsin, turns due south at Milwaukee, and ends at Chicago Union Station.

The westbound Empire Builder leaves Chicago in early afternoon, arriving in Milwaukee just before the afternoon rush and in St. Paul in the evening. After traveling overnight through Minnesota, it spends most of the following day traveling through North Dakota and Montana, arriving at Glacier National Park in the early evening and splitting late at night in Spokane. The Seattle section travels through the Cascades overnight, arriving in Seattle in mid-morning. The Portland section arrives in the Tri-Cities just before breakfast and in Portland in mid-morning. The eastbound Seattle and Portland sections leave within five minutes of each other just before the afternoon rush, combining in Spokane and traveling through Montana overnight before arriving at Glacier National Park in mid-morning and Williston at dinner time. After traveling overnight through North Dakota and Minnesota, it arrives in St. Paul at breakfast time, Columbus/Madison at lunch time, Milwaukee in early afternoon and Chicago just before the afternoon rush.

Stops at Milwaukee Airport and Sturtevant were added beginning March 21, 2020, to replace Hiawatha trains suspended due to the COVID-19-related drastic drop in demand. Additionally, local travel was allowed between Chicago and Milwaukee. These adjustments lasted until the train resumed its normal schedule in May 2021.

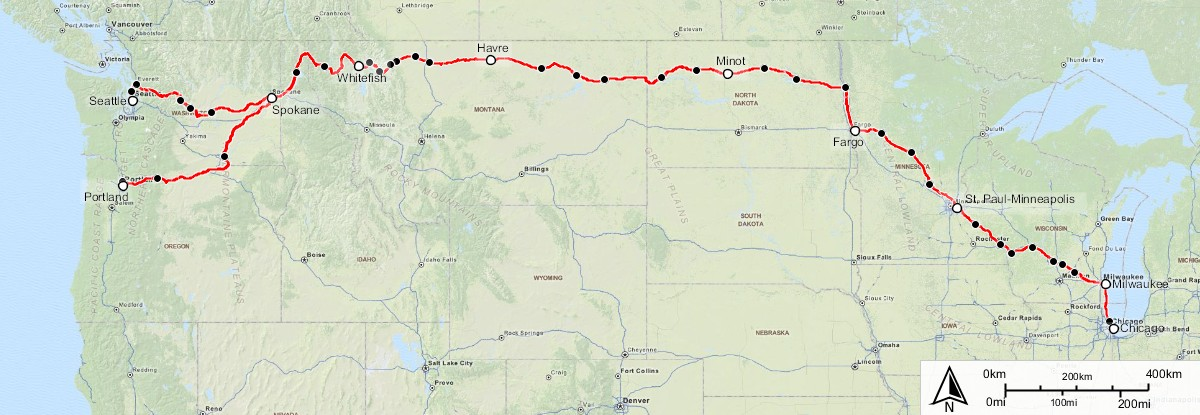
Empire Builder route map

=== Flooding ===
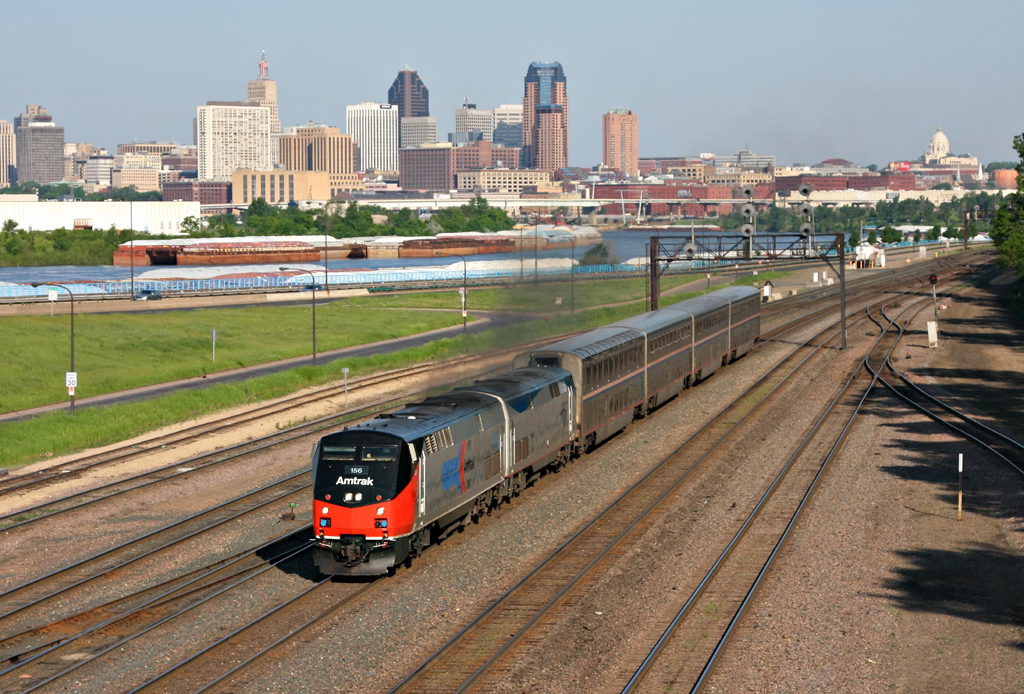
A GE Genesis in 40th-anniversary Phase I paint leads a stub Empire Builder out of St. Paul, Minnesota after floods suspended service west. (2011)

The line has come under threat from flooding from the Missouri, Souris, Red, and Mississippi Rivers, and has occasionally had to suspend or alter service. Most service gets restored in days or weeks, but Devils Lake in North Dakota, which has no natural outlet, is a long-standing threat. The lowest top-of-rail elevation in the lake crossing is 1,455.7 ft (443.70 m). In spring 2011, the lake reached 1,454.3 ft (443.27 m), causing service interruptions on windy days when high waves threatened the tracks.

BNSF, which owns the track, suspended freight operations through Devils Lake in 2009 and threatened to allow the rising waters to cover the line unless Amtrak could provide $100 million to raise the track. BNSF also offered Amtrak, during that time, to accommodate the Builder on the segment of the Transcon between Fargo and Minot, but that would have meant the loss of the Grand Forks, Devils Lake and Rugby station stops. To compensate for the loss of station stops at Grand Forks, Devils Lake, and Rugby that would have been caused by the shift, BNSF suggested that Amtrak add a station stop at New Rockford, North Dakota. However, Amtrak said that they would continue using the line by the lake. In 2010, analysts estimated that Amtrak would soon either have to rebuild the bridge that crosses the lake at Churchs Ferry, or reroute its passenger trains. In June 2011 agreement was reached that Amtrak and BNSF would each cover 1/3 of the cost with the rest to come from the federal and state governments.

In December 2011, North Dakota was awarded a $10 million TIGER grant from the US Department of Transportation to assist with the state portion of the cost. Work began in June 2012, and the track is being raised in two stages: 5 feet (1.5 m) in 2012, and another 5 feet in 2013. Two bridges and their abutments are also being raised. When the track raise is complete, the top-of-rail elevation will be 1,466 ft (446.84 m). This is 10 feet above the level at which the lake will naturally overflow and will thus be a permanent solution to the Devils Lake flooding.

In the spring and summer of 2011 flooding of the Souris River near Minot, North Dakota blocked the route in the latter part of June and for most of July. For some of that time the Empire Builder (with a typical consist of only four cars) ran from Chicago and terminated in Minneapolis/St Paul; to the west, the Empire Builder did not run east of Havre, Montana. (Other locations along the route also flooded, near Devils Lake, North Dakota and areas further west along the Missouri River.)

=== Freight train interference ===
An oil boom from the Bakken formation, combined with a robust fall 2013 harvest, led to a spike in the number of crude oil and grain trains using the Northern Transcon in Montana and North Dakota. The resulting congestion led to rampant delays for the Empire Builder, with the train running on time 44.5% in November 2013, the worst on-time performance of any Amtrak route and well below congressional standards. In some cases, the delays resulted in an imbalance of crew and equipment, forcing Amtrak to cancel runs of the Empire Builder. By May 2014, only 26% of Empire Builder trains had arrived within 30 minutes of their scheduled time, with delays averaging between 3 and 5 hours. In some cases, freight congestion and severe weather resulted in delays as long as 11 to 12 hours. This was a marked change from past years in which the Empire Builder was one of the best on-time performers in the entire Amtrak system, ahead of even the flagship Acela Express.

Due to the increasingly severe delays, Amtrak adjusted the route's schedule west of St. Paul on April 15, 2014. Westbound trains left St. Paul later, while eastbound trains left Seattle/Portland approximately three hours earlier. Operating hours for affected stations were also officially adjusted accordingly. The Amtrak announcement also said that BNSF was working on adding track capacity, and it was anticipated that sometime in 2015 the Empire Builder could be returned to its former schedule. In January 2015, it was announced that the train would resume its normal schedule.

Even during the worst of the delays, the train has seen frequent patronage from workers in the Bakken fields and their families who board and detrain in Williston. Passengers travel from as far as the Pacific Northwest.

=== Stations ===
Amtrak Empire Builder stations
State/Province	City	Station	Connections
Illinois	Chicago	Chicago Union	Amtrak (long-distance): California Zephyr, Cardinal, City of New Orleans, Floridian, Lake Shore Limited, Southwest Chief, Texas Eagle; Amtrak (intercity): Blue Water, Borealis, Hiawatha, Illini and Saluki, Illinois Zephyr and Carl Sandburg, Lincoln Service, Pere Marquette, Wolverine; Amtrak Thruway; Metra: BNSF, Heritage Corridor, Milwaukee District North, Milwaukee District West, North Central Service, SouthWest Service; Chicago "L": Blue (at Clinton) Brown Orange Pink Purple (at Quincy); Intercity bus: Greyhound Lines, Megabus; CTA, Pace
Illinois	Glenview	Glenview	Amtrak: Hiawatha, Borealis; Metra: Milwaukee District North; Pace
Wisconsin	Milwaukee	Milwaukee	Amtrak: Hiawatha, Borealis; Amtrak Thruway; The Hop; Intercity bus: Greyhound Lines, Indian Trails, Jefferson Lines, Lamers Bus Lines, Megabus, Wisconsin Coach Lines
Wisconsin	Columbus	Columbus	Amtrak: Borealis; Van Galder
Wisconsin	Portage	Portage	Amtrak: Borealis; Van Galder
Wisconsin	Wisconsin Dells	Wisconsin Dells	Amtrak: Borealis
Wisconsin	Tomah	Tomah	Amtrak: Borealis
Wisconsin	La Crosse	La Crosse	Amtrak: Borealis; Wisconsin Coach Lines; La Crosse MTU, SMRT
Minnesota	Winona	Winona	Amtrak: Borealis; Winona Transit Service
Minnesota	Red Wing	Red Wing	Amtrak: Borealis
Minnesota	St. Paul	Saint Paul	Amtrak: Borealis; Amtrak Thruway; Intercity bus: Greyhound Lines, Jefferson Lines, Megabus; Green Line; Metro Bus, Minnesota Valley Transit Authority
Minnesota	St. Cloud	St. Cloud	St. Cloud Metro Bus
Minnesota	Staples	Staples	
Minnesota	Detroit Lakes	Detroit Lakes	
North Dakota	Fargo	Fargo	MATBUS
North Dakota	Grand Forks	Grand Forks	
North Dakota	Devils Lake	Devils Lake	
North Dakota	Rugby	Rugby	
North Dakota	Minot	Minot	Minot City Transit
North Dakota	Stanley	Stanley	
North Dakota	Williston	Williston	
Montana	Wolf Point	Wolf Point	
Montana	Glasgow	Glasgow	
Montana	Malta	Malta	
Montana	Havre	Havre	
Montana	Shelby	Shelby	
Montana	Cut Bank	Cut Bank	
Montana	Browning	Browning	
Montana	East Glacier Park	East Glacier Park	
Montana	Essex	Essex	
Montana	West Glacier	West Glacier	
Montana	Whitefish	Whitefish	Greyhound Lines
Montana	Libby	Libby	
Idaho	Sandpoint	Sandpoint	
Washington (state)	Spokane	Spokane	Amtrak Thruway; Intercity bus: Greyhound Lines, Jefferson Lines, Northwestern Trailways, Travel Washington; Spokane Transit Authority
Washington (state)	Seattle Branch		
Washington (state)	Ephrata	Ephrata	Amtrak Thruway; Northwestern Trailways; Grant Transit Authority
Washington (state)	Wenatchee	Wenatchee	Northwestern Trailways, Travel Washington; Grant Transit Authority, Link Transit
Washington (state)	Leavenworth	Leavenworth	
Washington (state)	Everett	Everett	Amtrak: Amtrak Cascades; Amtrak Thruway; Sounder: N Line; Intercity bus: Greyhound Lines, Northwestern Trailways, ST Express; Sound Transit, Community Transit, Everett Transit, Skagit Transit, Island Transit
Washington (state)	Edmonds	Edmonds	Amtrak: Amtrak Cascades; Amtrak Thruway; Sounder: N Line; Edmonds-Kingston Ferry; Northwestern Trailways, Travel Washington; Community Transit
Washington (state)	Seattle	King Street	Amtrak: Amtrak Cascades, Coast Starlight; Amtrak Thruway; Sounder: N Line, S Line; Link Light Rail:, 1 Line, 2 Line (at International District/Chinatown); First Hill Streetcar; ST Express, Travel Washington; Community Transit, King County Metro, Sound Transit
Washington (state)	Portland Branch		
Washington (state)	Pasco	Pasco	Greyhound Lines; Travel Washington
Washington (state)	Wishram	Wishram	
Washington (state)	Bingen	Bingen–White Salmon	Mount Adams Transportation Service
Washington (state)	Vancouver	Vancouver, Washington	Amtrak: Amtrak Cascades, Coast Starlight
Oregon	Portland	Portland	Amtrak: Amtrak Cascades, Coast Starlight; MAX Light Rail: Orange Line, Yellow Line, Green Line; Portland Streetcar; The Bus, Central Oregon Breeze, FlixBus, Pacific Crest Lines, POINT, Shuttle Oregon, The Wave; Trimet Bus

=== Former stops ===
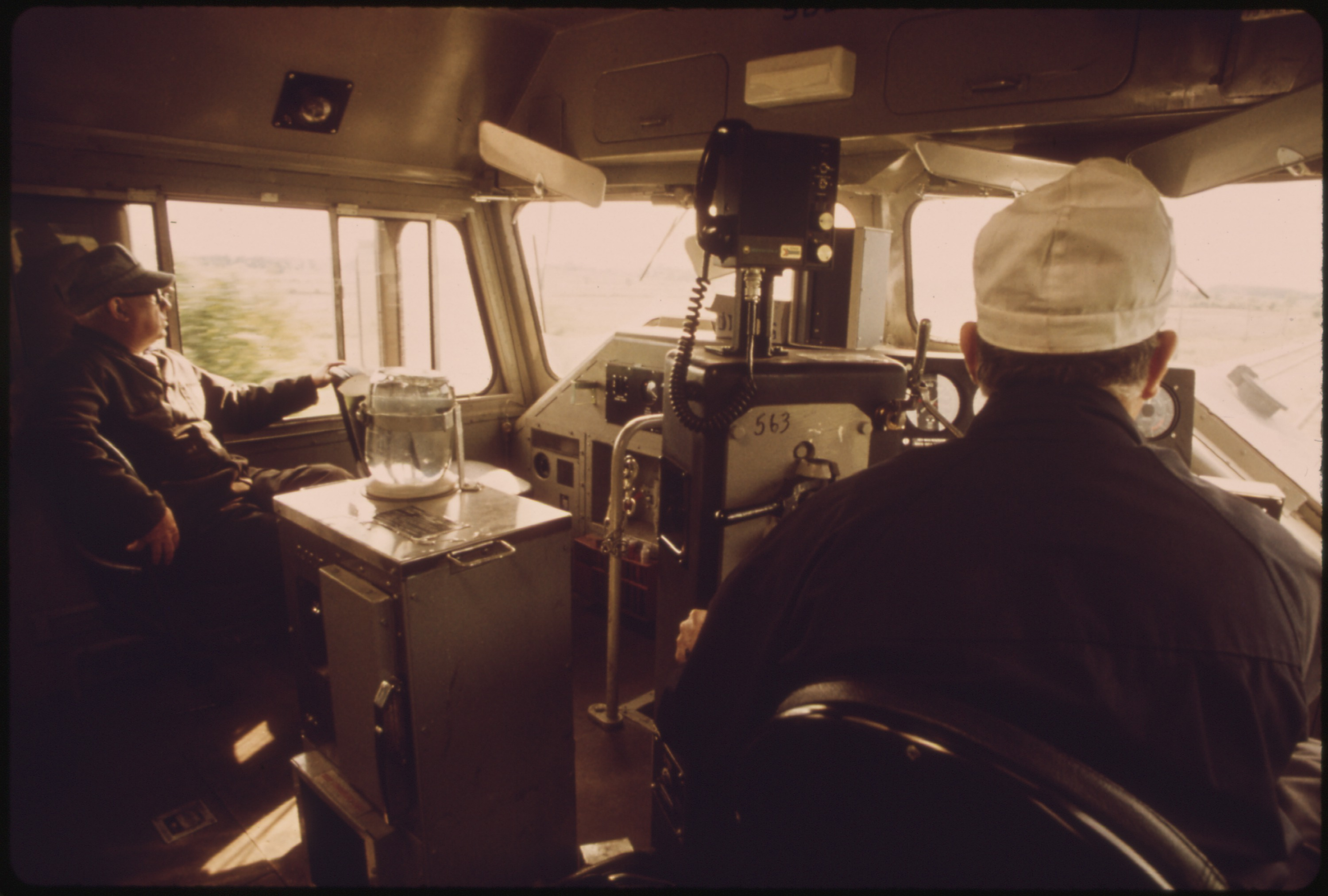
In the cab of the Empire Builder, 1974. Photo by Charles O'Rear.

In 1970, the construction and filling of Lake Koocanusa necessitated the realignment of 60 miles (97 km) of track between Stryker, Montana, and Libby, Montana, and the construction of Flathead Tunnel, leading the Empire Builder to drop service to Eureka, Montana. The Empire Builder also served Troy, Montana, until February 15, 1973.

On October 1, 1979, the Empire Builder was rerouted to operate over the North Coast Hiawatha's old route between Minneapolis and Fargo, North Dakota. With this alignment change, the Empire Builder dropped Willmar, Minnesota; Morris, Minnesota; and Breckenridge, Minnesota, while adding St. Cloud, Minnesota; Staples, Minnesota; and Detroit Lakes, Minnesota.

Another alignment change came on October 25, 1981, when the Seattle section was rerouted from the old Northern Pacific (which had also become part of the BN in 1970) to the Burlington Northern Railroad's line through the Cascade Tunnel over Stevens Pass. This change eliminated service to Yakima, Washington; Ellensburg, Washington; and Auburn, Washington. This change also introduced the Portland section, which returned service to the former Spokane, Portland and Seattle Railroad line (which became part of BN in 1970) along the Washington shore of the Columbia River. The route kept Pasco, but added Wishram, Bingen-White Salmon, and Vancouver (all in Washington) to the route. From Vancouver, the Portland section of the Empire Builder uses the same route as the Coast Starlight and Cascades trains to Portland Union Station.

It has been proposed that the Empire Builder and Hiawatha trains servicing Glenview, Illinois have their station stop be shifted one station north to the Metra station at North Glenview, to eliminate stops which block traffic on Glenview Road. North Glenview would have to be modified to handle additional traffic, and the move depends on commitments from Glenview, the Illinois General Assembly, and Metra. In Minnesota, the Empire Builder returned to Saint Paul Union Depot on May 7, 2014, 43 years after it last served the station the day before the start of Amtrak. Renovation of the 1917 Beaux Arts terminal was undertaken in 2011, continuing through 2013, resulting in a multi-mode terminal used by Jefferson Lines, Greyhound Lines, commuter bus and the Metro Green Line, providing a light rail connection to downtown Minneapolis. The station replaced Midway Station which opened in 1978 after the initial abandonment of Saint Paul Union Depot in 1971 and the demolition of Minneapolis Great Northern Depot in 1978.

== Equipment ==
=== Current equipment ===
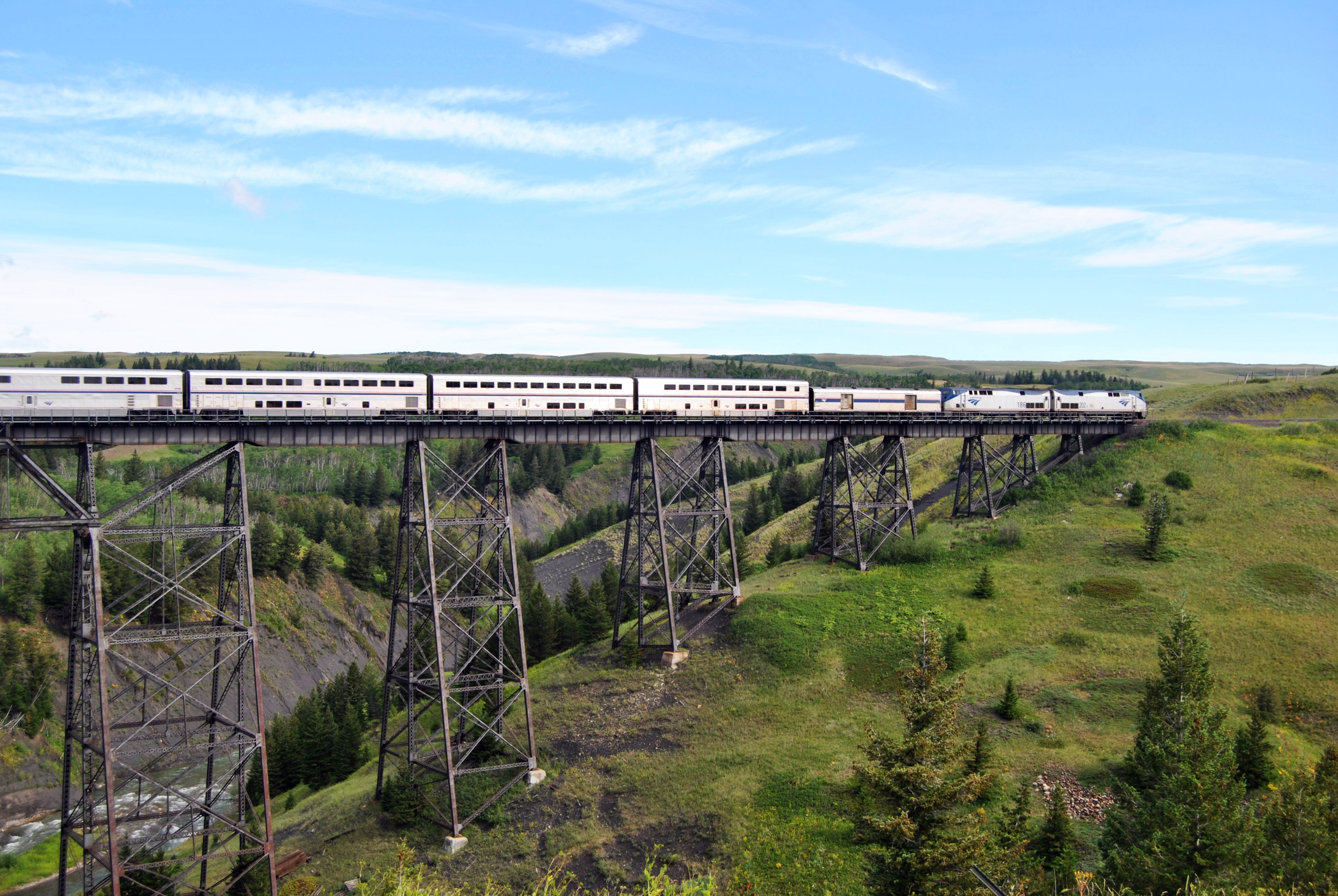
Empire Builder crosses the Two Medicine Trestle at East Glacier Park, Montana, 2011.

Like all long-distance trains west of the Mississippi River, the Empire Builder uses bilevel Superliner passenger cars (except for the baggage car). The Empire Builder was the first train to be fully equipped with Superliners, with the first run occurring on October 28, 1979.

A typical Empire Builder consist includes:

- Two or three GE Genesis or Siemens Charger ALC-42 locomotives
- Viewliner baggage car
- Superliner transition sleeper car
- Two Superliner sleeper cars
- Superliner diner
- Superliner coach
- Superliner Sightseer Lounge/café
- Superliner coach
- Superliner coach/baggage car
- Superliner sleeper

In Spokane, the westbound train is split: the locomotives, baggage car, and first six passenger cars continue on to Seattle as train 7, while a single locomotive is used to take the remaining cars (including the lounge/cafe) to Portland as train 27. Eastbound the sections are combined in a reverse fashion, with the Seattle section numbered as train 8 and the Portland section as train 28. During peak travel periods, an additional coach is added to the rear of the train between Chicago and St. Paul. It is left overnight in St. Paul for the next day's return trip to pick up. This car is designated train 807 westbound and train 808 eastbound.

Amtrak's Siemens Charger ALC-42 locomotives were first used in revenue service on the Empire Builder on February 8, 2022.

=== Historical equipment ===
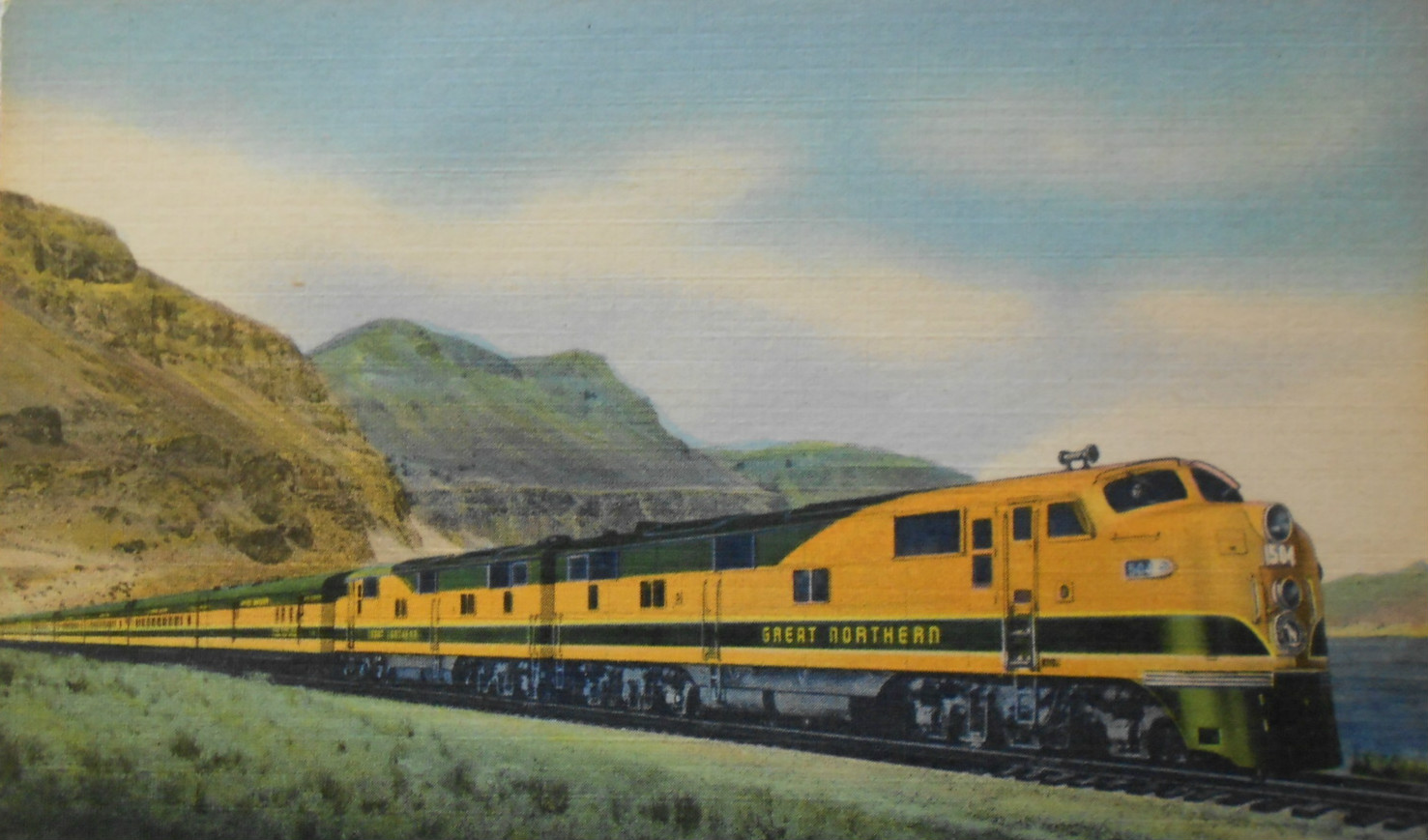
The train along the Columbia River, c. 1947

When first launched in 1929, the Great Northern provided new heavyweight consists. When the railway received five new streamlined trainsets in 1947, the old heavyweight sets were used to reintroduce the Oriental Limited. In 1951 the Empire Builder was re-equipped with six new streamlined trainsets; the 1947 cars were used to launch the Western Star, while the Oriental Limited was retired. When the GN acquired dome coaches in 1955, the 1951 coaches went to Western Star, while the 1947 coaches went to the pool of spare and extra-movement cars. Ownership of the cars on the Empire Builder was by-and-large split between the Great Northern and the Chicago, Burlington and Quincy Railroad (CB&Q), though a couple of cars in the original consists were owned by the Spokane, Portland and Seattle Railway (SP&S). In this consist, one of the 48-seat "chair" cars and one of the 4-section sleepers were used for the connection to Portland, while the rest of the consist connected to Seattle.

The Great Northern coaches eventually found their way into state-subsidized commuter service for the Central Railroad of New Jersey after the Burlington Northern merger and remained until 1987 when NJ Transit retired its last E8A locomotive. Some of these cars remain in New Jersey. Some coaches were acquired from the Union Pacific; these also went to New Jersey. One of the 28 seat coach-dinette cars also remains in New Jersey and is stored near Interstate 78 wearing tattered Amtrak colors.

== Bibliography ==
- "North Coast Hiawatha: Passenger Rail Study" (PDF). Amtrak. October 16, 2009. Archived from the original (PDF) on October 19, 2015.
- Hidy, Ralph W.; Hidy, Muriel E.; Scott, Roy V.; Hofsummer, Don L. (2004) [1988]. The Great Northern Railway: A History. Minneapolis: Minnesota University Press. ISBN 978-0-816-64429-2. OCLC 54885353.
- Sanders, Craig (2006). Amtrak in the Heartland. Bloomington, Indiana: Indiana University Press. ISBN 978-0-253-34705-3.
- Shuldiner, Herbert (June 1974). "Take the train to your next campsite?". Popular Science. Vol. 204, no. 6. pp. 110–111, 154.
- Wayner, Robert J., ed. (1972). Car Names, Numbers and Consists. New York: Wayner Publications. OCLC 8848690.
- Yenne, Bill (2005). Great Northern Empire Builder. Great Passenger Trains. MBI. ISBN 0-7603-1847-6. OCLC 57142776.
