= Tomah Subdivision =

Railway line in Wisconsin

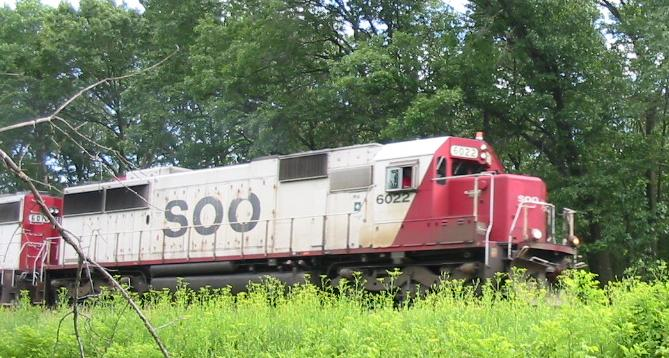
- Soo Line 6022, an EMD SD60, pulls a train through Wisconsin Dells on June 20, 2004.

Overview
- Status: Active
- Owner: Canadian Pacific Kansas City
- Locale: Wisconsin
- Termini: La Crosse; Portage

Service
- Type: Freight, passenger
- Operator(s): Canadian Pacific Kansas City, Amtrak

History
- Commenced: 1857
- Completed: 1876

Technical
- Line length: 103 mi (166 km)
- Number of tracks: 1–2
- Track gauge: 4 ft 8 1/2 in (1,435 mm) standard gauge

The Tomah Subdivision or Tomah Sub is a railway line that runs about 103 miles (166 km) from La Crosse, WI in the west to Portage, WI in the east.

The line is operated by Canadian Pacific Kansas City through its subsidiary, the Soo Line Railroad. The line crosses the Mississippi River between La Crescent, MN and La Crosse. Junctions in La Crescent lead to the River Subdivision to the north and the Marquette Subdivision to the south. East of Portage, the rails continue as the Watertown Subdivision. Interstate 90 runs roughly parallel to the rail line.

== History ==
Most of this segment of track was quickly built over the span of two years. The line was completed from Portage to New Lisbon in 1857, and from New Lisbon to La Crosse in 1858. It took several more years for the crossing of the Mississippi River into Minnesota to take place, but that finally was completed in 1876.

The Tomah Subdivision previously had been operated by the Chicago, Milwaukee, St. Paul and Pacific Railroad (Milwaukee Road). In 1935, the Milwaukee Road introduced the Hiawatha passenger train, which ran at high speed between St. Paul and Chicago. Speeds were routinely over 100 mph, and with ATS in use between Portage and Hastings, MN, the Hiawatha had no speed limit. The Soo Line Railroad took it over in 1986 before Canadian Pacific did so in the 1990s. CP amalgamated with the Kansas City Southern Railway on April 14, 2023, to form CPKC.

== Current usage ==
Today, Amtrak's Empire Builder and Borealis service use the CPKC between Chicago and St. Paul, but speed is limited to 79 miles per hour (127 km/h). Along this segment they stop in La Crosse, Tomah, Wisconsin Dells, and Portage. The Empire Builder has used the line since 1971, and the Borealis began service in 2024.

The Union Pacific Railroad has trackage rights from Tunnel City, WI through La Crosse. These date from the Chicago and North Western reroute after the collapse of the CNW tunnel.
