= Tacoma station (Milwaukee Road) =

Rail station in Tacoma, Washington

Tacoma
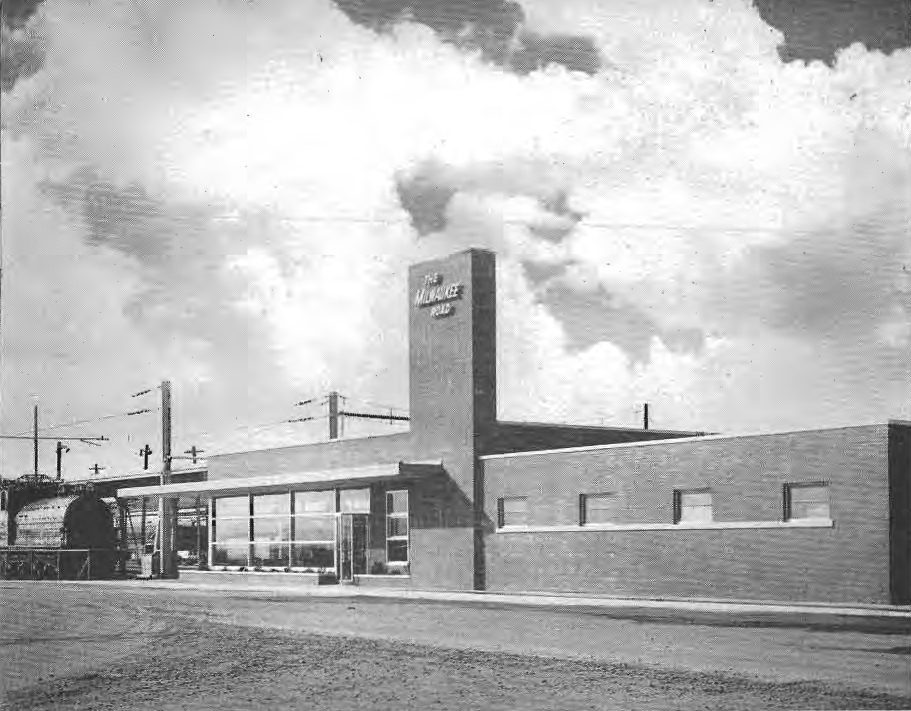
- The depot at the time of its opening in 1954. A Milwaukee Road class EP-2 is at left.

General information
- Location: East 11th and Milwaukee Way, Tacoma, Washington; United States
- Coordinates: 47°15′49.3″N 122°24′39.2″W
- System: Milwaukee Road station
- Owner: Milwaukee Road

History
- Opened: April 20, 1954
- Closed: May 22, 1961

Former services
Preceding station	Milwaukee Road	Following station
Terminus	Main Line	North Pullayup toward Chicago
Hillsdale toward Hoquiam	Hoquiam – Tacoma	Terminus
Hillsdale toward Morton	Mount Rainier National Park Branch	Terminus
Location

The Tacoma station was a passenger rail station in Tacoma, Washington, owned by the Chicago, Milwaukee, St. Paul and Pacific Railroad (the "Milwaukee Road"). It opened in 1954 and closed in 1961. It was the Milwaukee Road's final station in Tacoma, replacing a station formerly owned by the Tacoma Eastern Railroad.

== Design ==
The building was designed by K. E. Hornung of Chicago. The station interior was 4,000 square feet (370 m^{2}) and included a ticket office, baggage room, restrooms, and a separate lounge for women. A noteworthy feature of the waiting room was a gold-toned mural of the Chicago skyline (the Milwaukee Road's headquarters were also in Chicago.) The masonry construction incorporated a Red Roman brick finish. The building's centerpiece was a 32 feet (9.8 m) tower topped by a large stainless-steel sign bearing the name of the company. The waiting room itself featured full-height glass windows on two facings, overlooking the Milwaukee rail yards. The station cost the Milwaukee Road $150,000.

== History ==
The Milwaukee Road had used the Tacoma Eastern Railroad's former station since beginning service to Tacoma in 1909. That station was located at South 25th and A street, near the present location of the South 25th Street Tacoma Link station and Interstate 705. The new station sat at East 11th and Milwaukee Way, near the Milwaukee Road's yard in the Tideflats area and roughly 1.7 miles (2.7 km) from the old station. The first train to use the station was a westbound Columbian, which arrived from Chicago on April 20, 1954. The first train to depart was an eastbound Olympian Hiawatha. Service ended with the discontinuation of the Olympian Hiawatha on May 22, 1961.

== See also ==
- Tacoma Union Station
