= Union Station (Seattle) =

- U.S. National Register of Historic Places
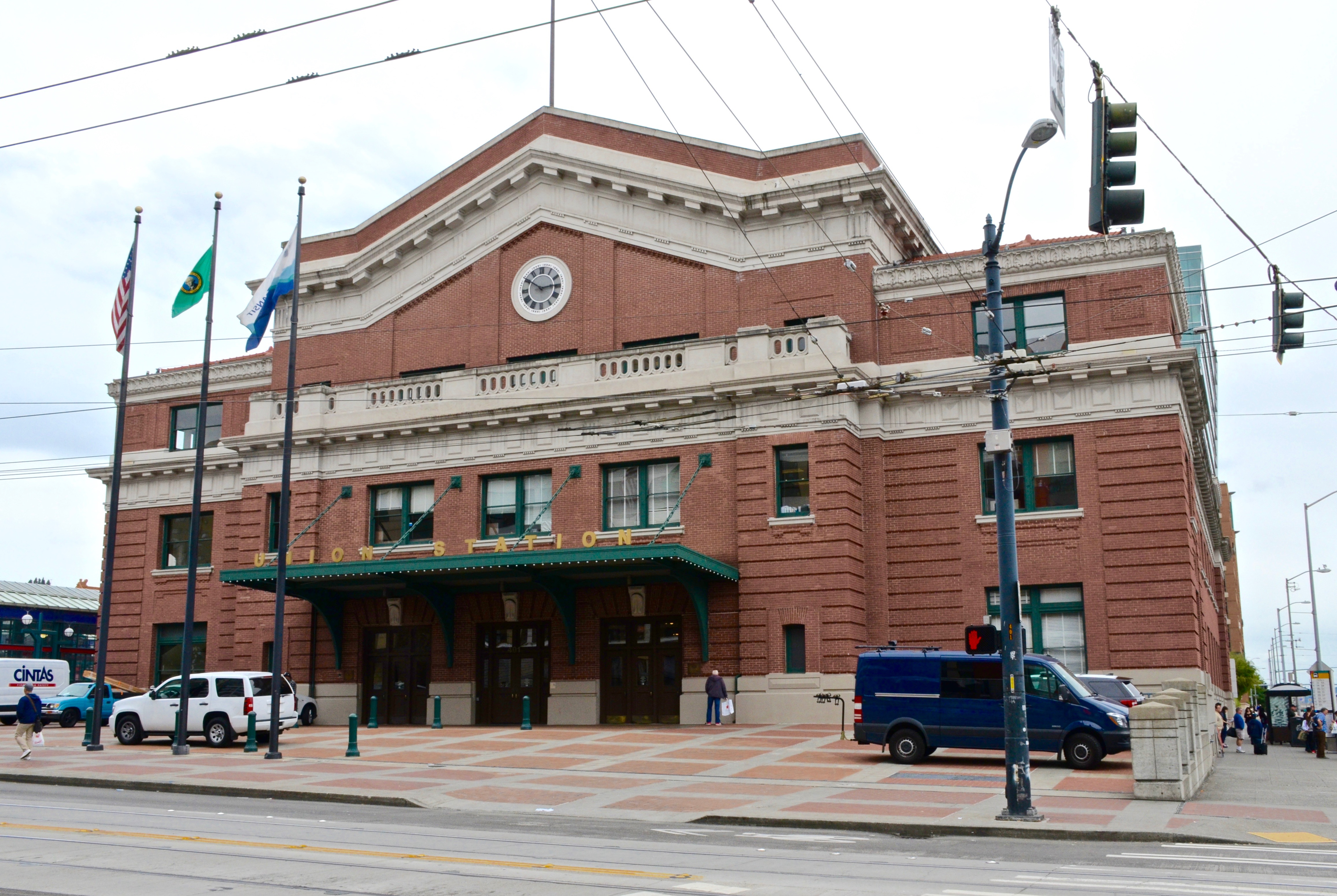
- The building's exterior in 2016

- Location within Washington (state) Location within the United States
- Location: 4th Ave. S. and S. Jackson St. Seattle, Washington, U.S.
- Coordinates: 47.5987°N 122.3285°W
- Built: 1910–11
- Architect: Daniel J. Patterson
- Architectural style: Beaux-Arts
- NRHP reference No.: 74001960
- Added to NRHP: August 30, 1974

Union Station is a former train station in Seattle, Washington, United States, constructed between 1910 and 1911 to serve the Union Pacific Railroad and the Milwaukee Road. It was originally named Oregon and Washington Station, after a subsidiary line of the Union Pacific. It serves today as the headquarters of Sound Transit, the public transit agency serving the city and metro area.

== History ==
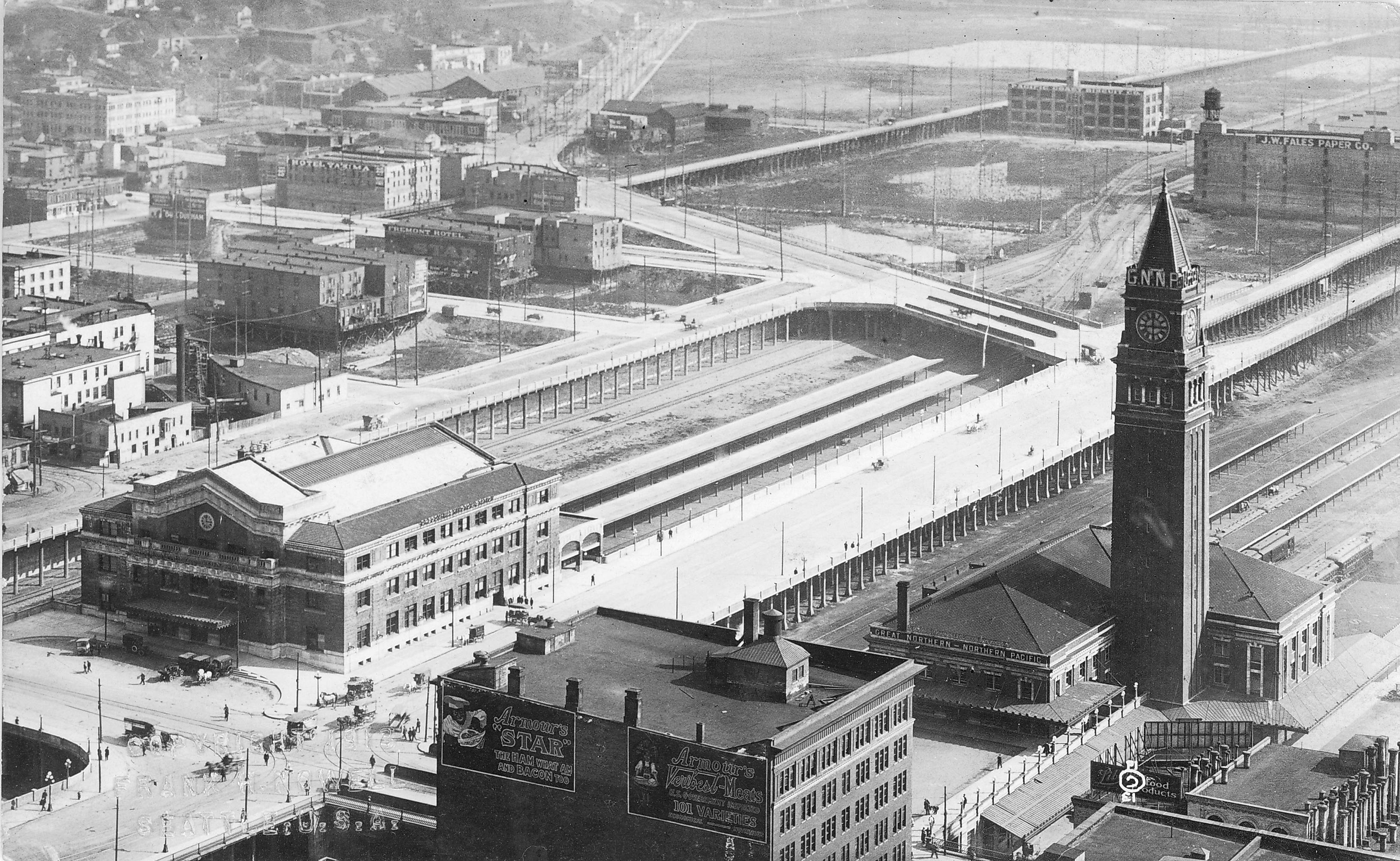
Union Station (left) and King Street Station photographed from the Smith Tower, 1913

Located at the corner of S. Jackson Street and 4th Avenue S. in the Pioneer Square neighborhood, the station opened on May 20, 1911. The Milwaukee Road discontinued passenger service to Union Station 50 years later, on May 22, 1961, and the Union Pacific followed suit on April 30, 1971. With no passenger rail service serving Seattle from Union Station, the building remained largely empty. An antique store filled the great hall for several years. After nearly 30 years of sitting idle, the station finally experienced an expansive renovation supported by Nitze-Stagen with financial backing from Microsoft co-founder Paul Allen. The Union Station's renovation was the winner of the 2000 National Historic Preservation Award. The building has served as the headquarters of Sound Transit since 1999. Its grand hall is available to the public as a venue for weddings and other events.

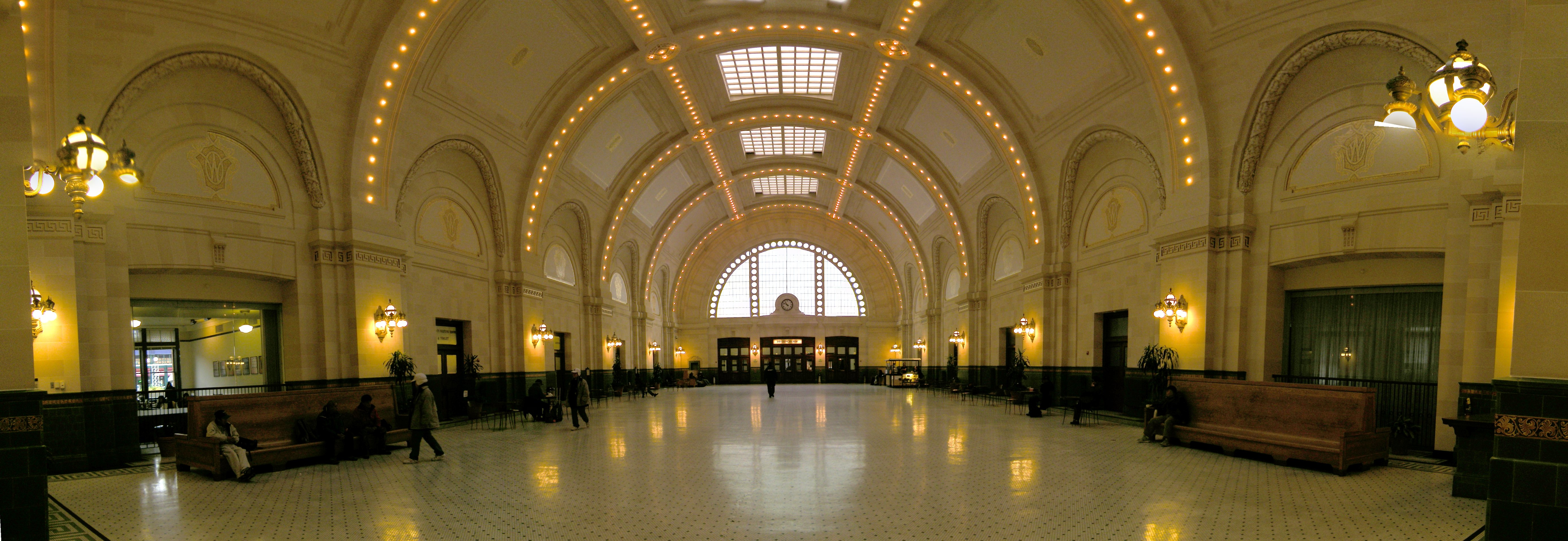
Interior, as seen from the front entrance

In Seattle, the term Union Station refers not only to the main station building, but also to the several adjacent office buildings at 505, 605, 625 and 705 5th Avenue South. Amazon.com was a major tenant of these properties from 2000 to 2011, all but one owned by Opus Northwest, and the other by Vulcan. The entire complex is earthquake-proofed by an underground ring of rubber.

The remaining passenger train service to Seattle (Amtrak long-distance trains and Sounder commuter trains) operates from King Street Station, located one block to the west of Union Station. The International District/Chinatown station of the Downtown Seattle Transit Tunnel is located directly adjacent to Union Station, mostly below street level. It opened in 1990 by Metro Transit to serve buses and was renovated in the 2000s to also accommodate Link light rail trains on Sound Transit's 1 Line. Union Station is proposed as the site of a second light rail station for the Ballard Link Extension, which would be constructed under 4th Avenue under one proposal.

It was used as the Teikoku train station in the pilot episode of The Man in the High Castle.

Preceding station	Milwaukee Road	Following station
Terminus	Main Line	Black River toward Chicago
Preceding station	Union Pacific Railroad	Following station
Kent toward Portland	Portland–Seattle Line	Terminus
