= Entenmann =

Entenmann is a surname of German origin, meaning "ducks man", referring to someone who keeps ducks. Notable people with the surname include:

- Charles E. Entenmann (1929–2022), American executive
- Martha Entenmann (1906–1996), American businesswoman
- Mathias Entenmann (born 1981), German former rugby player
- Willi Entenmann (1943–2012), German football coach and player

== See also ==
- Entenmann's, American baked goods company
