= Instituto de Pensamiento Estratégico Ágora =

Mexican think tank

The Instituto de Pensamiento Estratégico Ágora (IPEA)
- Established: 2008
- Mission: to promote a free, virtuous and prosperous society based on ethical principles, and individual & public responsibility through the respect of human dignity, a free market economy, a limited government by the rule of law and a strong democracy.
- President: Armando Regil
- Location: México, Mexico
- Website: www.ipea.institute

The Instituto de Pensamiento Estratégico Ágora A.C. (IPEA) is a private, independent, apolitical and non-profit think tank dedicated to the construction of a free, virtuous and prosperous society. It focuses on the development of youth, research and public policy proposals.

== Undertakings ==
=== IPEA University ===
Since 2009 IPEA University has been an annual week-long summer seminar where young students and leaders get together to discuss the world's and Mexico's most pressing issues and how to solve them.

=== National movement ===
The A Million Youths for México movement's goals are to unite 1 million young Mexicans in order to transform the country. The following five "strategic axes" guiding the vision for the movement are:

1. Democratic society and rule of law
2. Economic development and adaptability
3. Education for the consolidation of human potential
4. Governability, democracy and civil society
5. Social cohesion

=== University chapters ===
IPEA University chapters develop, analyze and breakdown research to better communicate the corresponding findings to Mexican society and decision makers. IPEA first chapter started in ITESM campus Querétaro. Today it has chapter in different campus such as:

University Chapter	Current President
Instituto Tecnologico y de Estudios Superiores de Monterrey Santa Fe	Raymundo Von Bertrab
Instituto Tecnologico y de Estudios Superiores de Monterrey Querétaro	José Alejandro Enríquez
Instituto Tecnológico Autónomo de México	Fernando Alcázar
Universidad Panamericana Sede Mexico	Lurdes Gutiérrez
Escuela Libre de Derecho	Stephanie Valerio
Universidad Nacional Autónoma de México	Tahiri Trillanes

=== Courses ===
- Values 2.0.

Values 2.0 is designed to develop a culture of integrity, legality and order.

- Strategic communication.

The Strategic communication course is meant to teach rules and techniques of public speaking and communication in order to communicate in an effective and impactful manner an idea or project to a specific audience.

- Public Policies.

This course is meant to analyze the methodologies and techniques for the design, implementation and evaluation of the impacts that public policies have in Mexico.

One of the most important activities of IPEA is the project to train a generation of young political leaders called One Million Young People for Mexico, which currently has a presence in 13 cities in Mexico through 8 universities. These student groups constitute the IPEA Chapters.

== Legion of Liberty Award ==
Since 2009 the IPEA together with the Ludwig Von Mises Institute has awarded the Legion of Liberty to those "individuals that have proven to be the absolute defenders of individual liberty in any given part of the world. They are catalysts of extraordinary change and are renowned for being congruent between what they say and what they do regardless of the risks and sacrifices that are involved in doing so."

Prize Winners
Year	Recipient	Nationality	News
2009	Lech Wałęsa	Poland	
2009	Margaret Thatcher	England	Link
2010	Lorenzo Servitje	Mexico	
2011	Álvaro Uribe	Colombia	

== International friends ==
- James M. Buchanan, Nobel Laureate in Economics 1986.
- Mart Laar, Prime Minister of Estonia 1992-1994 and 1999-2002.
- Francisco Flores, President of El Salvador 1999 – 2004.
- José María Figueres, President of Costa Rica 1994 - 1998.
- Lord Brian Griffiths of Fforestfach, Vice Chairman of Goldman Sachs International, Director Bank of England 1983 – 1985 and Senior Adviser to Lady Margaret Thatcher 1985 – 1990.
- José Piñera, Minister of Labor and Mining 1978 – 1980 Chile.
- Hernán Buchi, Minister of Finance 1985 – 1989 Chile.
- Antonio Martino, Minister of Foreign Affairs 1994 – 1995 and Minister of Defense 2001- 2006 in Italy.
- Mario Vargas Llosa, President Fundación Internacional para la Libertad.
- Andrei Illarionov, Senior Fellow The Cato Institute, Chief Economic Adviser to Russian President Vladimir Putin 2000 – 2005.
- Miranda Xafa, Alternate Director and Executive Board Member, International Monetary Fund, Chief Economic Adviser to Greek Prime Minister Konstantinos Mitsotakis 1991 – 1993.
- Edwin Meese III, Attorney General United States of America 1985 – 1988.
- Fabián Koss, IDB Youth Program Coordinator, Inter-American Development Bank.
- Harriet M. Fulbright, President The William and Harriet Fulbright Center.
- Hernando de Soto, President Instituto Libertad y Democracia in Peru.
- Leonard Liggio, Executive Vice President Atlas Economic Research Foundation.
- Edwin Feulner, President of The Heritage Foundation.
- Pascal Salin, Professor of Economics Université Paris-Dauphine.
- John Blundell, General Director, Institute of Economic Affairs, United Kingdom.
- Linda Whetstone, Chair International Policy Network, Board Member of the IEA and Atlas Economic Research Foundation.
- Thomas Rustici, Professor of Economics Georgetown University and George Mason University.
- Ian Vásquez, Director Center for Global Liberty and Prosperity at the Cato Institute.
- John Bailey, Professor of Government and Foreign Service and Director of the Mexico Project at the Center for Latin American Studies, Georgetown University.
- Carlos Alberto Montaner, Journalist and Writer.
- Anna Halpine, Founder World Youth Alliance.
- Barbara Kolm, Director F.A. Hayek Institute in Austria.
- Christof Zellenberg, President, Europa Institut in Austria. Director of Private Wealth Management for Central and Eastern Europe, Deutsche Bank.
- Alberto Mingardi, President, Instituto Bruno Leoni in Italy.
- Liu Junning, President, Cathay Institute of Public Affairs in China.
- Jargal Dambadarjaa, President, New Policy Institute in Mongolia.
- Franklin Cudjoe, Director, IMANI Center for Policy and Education in Ghana.
- Bruno Atieh, Co-Founder Youth League for Lebanon.

== Board of trustees ==
- Carlos Kasuga Osaka, Chief Executive Officer, Yakult
- Daniel Servitje, Chief Executive Officer, Gropo Bimbo
- Alejandro Ramírez Magaña, Chief Executive Officer, Cinépolis
- Manuel Arango Arias, President, Concord Group
- Nicolás Mariscal Torroella, Chairman, Marhnos Group
- Femsa Group

== Academic board ==
- Carolina R. de Bolívar, Founder and Executive President Instituto Cultural Ludwig von Mises A.C.
- Roberto Salinas León, President México Business Forum.
- Javier Prieto de La Fuente, Head of the Department of Leadership Tecnológico de Monterrey.
- Everardo Elizondo Almaguer, Deputy Governor Banco de México 2000-2008.
- Alejandro Ardila Manzanera, Professor of the Department of Economics Tecnológico de Monterrey.
- Gerardo Gil Valdivia, President Mexican Chapter the Club of Rome.
- Pedro Ortiz Díaz, President of MSD Consulting Business Development & Strategy Design.

== Board of directors ==
- Armando Regil Velasco, President
- Luis Castellanos Velasco, Director of Research
- Claudia Regil Velasco, Director of Programs and Education

== Partners ==
- J. William and Harriet Fulbright Center
- The Fund for American Studies
- SELIDER
- World Youth Alliance
- Acton Institute, Argentina
- Institute of International and European Affairs
- Europa Institut
- Atlas Economic Research Foundation
- Ludwig Von Mises Institute
- Universidad Francisco Marroquin
