= Marina de Tavira =

Mexican actress

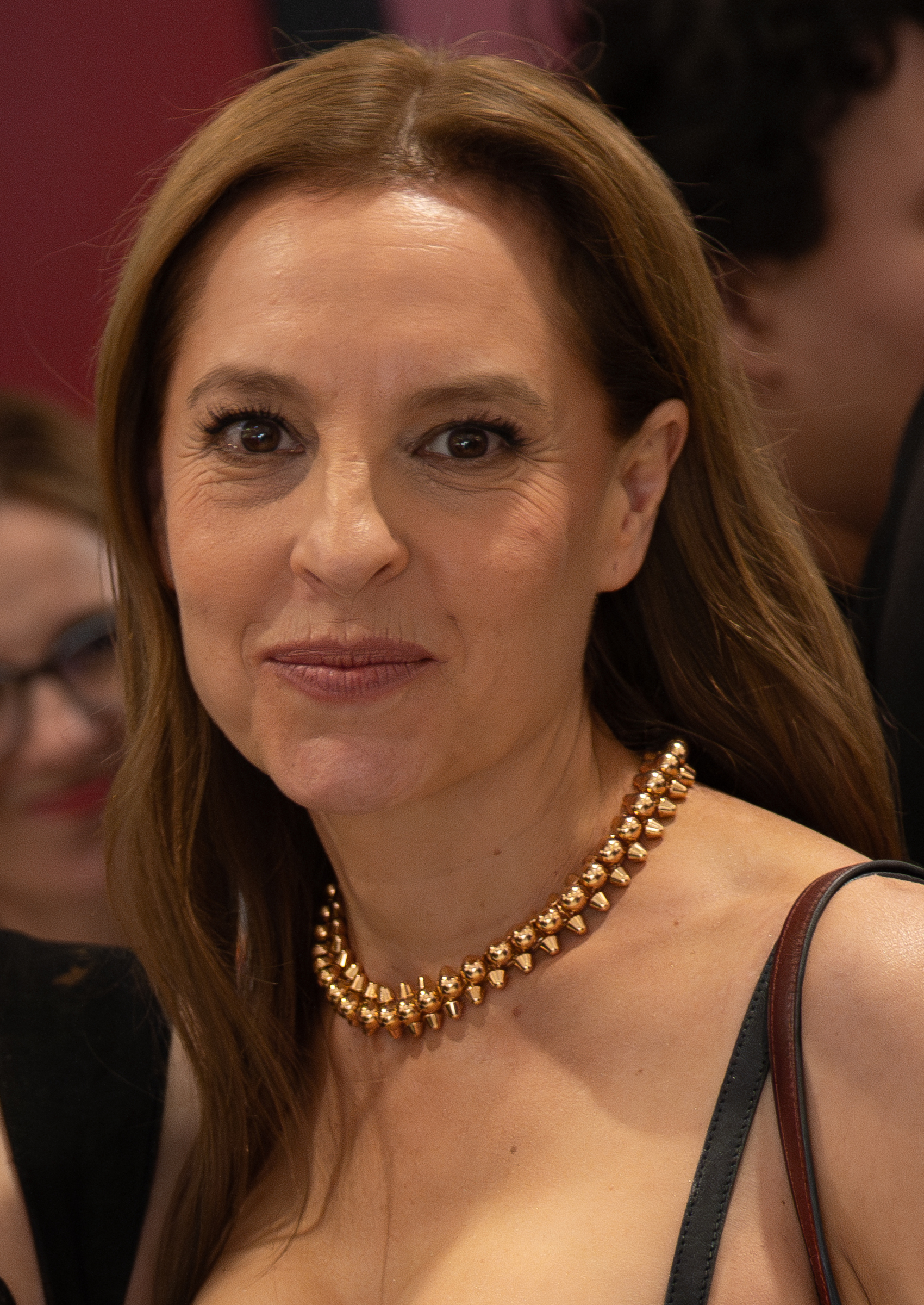
- de Tavira in 2026
- Born: Marina de Tavira Servitje; 21 November 1973 (age 52); Mexico City, Mexico
- Occupation: Actress
- Years active: 1998–present
- Partner: Diego Luna (2019-present)
- Children: 1
- Relatives: José María de Tavira (cousin); Lorenzo Servitje (grandfather); Rosa María Bianchi (aunt); Daniel Servitje (uncle)

Marina de Tavira Servitje (born 21 November 1973) is a Mexican actress. She is internationally known for her role in the film Roma (2018), for which she received widespread acclaim and a nomination for the Academy Award for Best Supporting Actress.

== Early life ==
Tavira was born in Mexico City to María Servitje Montull, a theology teacher and director of the Mexican Institute of Christian Social Doctrine, and criminologist Juan Pablo de Tavira. She grew up in Mexico City with two siblings, and was interested in acting from a young age, inspired in part by her paternal uncle, playwright Luis de Tavira.

Her father was a respected criminologist who played a significant role in shaping the modern Mexican penitentiary system, as a leader and an outspoken critic. Like much of his family, he had a lifelong interest in theater and is credited for incorporating theater into Mexican prisoner rehabilitation. Among other leadership roles, he was the first director of Mexico's famed Altiplano Prison. After many death threats, he was assassinated in November 2000. In 2023, Joaquín "El Chapo" Guzmán and Héctor "El Güero" Palma were implicated in his death.

Tavira studied acting at La Casa del Teatro and the Núcleo de Estudios Teatrales, among other programs.

== Life and career ==
Tavira's first job after graduating was acting in the play Feliz nuevo siglo doktor Freud (Happy New Century, Doktor Freud) by Sabina Berman. Marina de Tavira's father, a high official in the Mexican criminal justice system, was murdered in 2000, a day before her acting debut in Berman's play. Luis Rosales, a casting director at Netflix, was at this debut and later asked her to participate in Alfonso Cuarón's film Roma.

Tavira has been active in Mexican theater since the 1990s. She is a member and founder, along with Enrique Singer, of the Incidente Teatro production company with which they have premiered Betrayal by Harold Pinter, Crimes of the Heart by Beth Henley, La mujer justa by Hugo Urquijo (based on the novel by Sándor Márai), and The Anarchist by David Mamet. In the 2000s, she taught at the Casa del Teatro.

In 2019, she was nominated for the Academy Award for Best Supporting Actress for her role as the character Sofía in Roma, alongside Amy Adams, Regina King, Emma Stone and Rachel Weisz in the same category. After this nomination, she returned to the theater in the play Skylight, at her alma mater, the Casa del Teatro in Mexico City.

== Personal life ==
Tavira was born into prominent Mexican families. Her maternal grandfather is Lorenzo Servitje, the founder of Grupo Bimbo, and her uncle Daniel Servitje is the current CEO. As of 2026, Tavira sits on the company's Board of Directors. On her father's side, her uncle is playwright Luis de Tavira and is married to the actress Rosa María Bianchi, and was previously married to actress Julieta Egurrola. Her cousins include actors José María de Tavira and Pedro de Tavira Egurrola, and director Julián de Tavira.

From 2012 to 2019, she had a relationship with Mexican actor Rafael Sánchez Navarro. Since 2019, she has been in a relationship with Mexican actor Diego Luna. De Tavira has maintained a private personal life; she has one child.

== Filmography ==
Year	Title	Role	Notes
1999	Viajando sobre los durmientes	Marina	Short film
2005	A Good Death Beats a Dull Life (Hijas de su madre: Las Buenrostro)	Tere	
2006	Un mundo maravilloso	Sick Woman	
2006	Muerte anunciada		Short film
2006	Side Effects (Efectos secundarios)	Marina	
2007	The Zone (La zona)	Andrea	
2008	Love, Pain and Vice Versa (Violanchelo)	Marcela Padilla	
2008	Road to Fame (Casi divas)	Model	
2008	El comienzo del fin	Ella	Short film
2008	Nora's Will (Cinco días sin Nora)	Young Nora Kurtz	
2010	Desafío	Julieta	
2011	Viento en contra	Lizeta	
2015	Los árboles mueren de pie	Helena	
2015	Azul maduro	Lorena Grande	Short film
2017	Ana and Bruno (Ana y Bruno)	Carmen	Voice role
2017	How to Break Up with Your Douchebag (Cómo cortar a tu patán)	Mamá Amanda	
2018	Cómplices	Teresa	
2018	Roma	Sra. Sofía	Ariel Award for Best Supporting Actress; Nominated—Academy Award for Best Supporting Actress; Nominated—Platino Award for Best Actress
2018	Niebla de Culpa	Amanda	
2019	This Is Not Berlin (Esto no es Berlín)	Carolina	
2021	Reminiscence	Tamara “Swati” Sylvan	

== Awards and nominations ==
Academy Awards
Year	Category	Work	Result	Ref.
2019	Best Supporting Actress	Roma	Nominated	

Premios Platino
Year	Category	Work	Result	Ref.
2019	Best female role	Roma	Nominated	

Ariel Awards
year	Category	Work	Result	Ref.
2019	Best Supporting Actress	Roma	Won	
