= Lorenzo Servitje =

Mexican accountant and businessman

- Born: Lorenzo Servitje Sendra; November 20, 1918; Mexico City, Mexico
- Died: February 3, 2017 (aged 98); Mexico City, Mexico
- Occupation: Businessman
- Known for: Co-founder, Grupo Bimbo
- Spouse: Carmen Montull Vallesta
- Children: 8, including Daniel Servitje

Lorenzo Servitje Sendra (Spanish pronunciation: [loˈɾenso seɾˈβiɟʝe ˈsendɾa]), (November 20, 1918 – February 3, 2017) was a Mexican accountant and businessman, who co-founded Grupo Bimbo, the world's largest bakery company, in 1945 with four partners, Jaime Jorba, Jaime Sendra, Alfonso Velasco and José T. Mata.

== Biography ==
Servitje was born in the capital of Mexico, Mexico City, on November 20, 1918. His father, Juan Servitje, a baker by profession, and his mother, Josefina Sendra, had immigrated to Mexico from Catalonia in Spain. His granddaughter is the actress Marina de Tavira, who appeared in the film Roma.

Servitje is credited with expanding Bimbo from a small, Mexican baking company into a multinational conglomerate that has acquired more than 100 domestic and international brands, including Thomas', Entenmann's, Stroehmann, Oroweat and Freihofer's. Servitje was Bimbo's president from 1945 to 1981, and remained chairman until 1994.

He co-founded Bimbo in 1945 with ten delivery vans and thirty-eight employees. By 2017, Bimbo owned 100 brands in 22 countries. The company reported $10.7 billion in sales in 2015.

== Death ==
Lorenzo Servitje died in Mexico City on February 3, 2017, at the age of 98. He was predeceased by his wife, Carmen Montull Valles, who died in 2002, and survived by eight children, 24 grandchildren and 48 great-grandchildren.

His son, Daniel Servitje, is now the chairman and CEO of Grupo Bimbo.

Dignitaries in attendance at Servitje's funeral included Mexican President Enrique Peña Nieto, chairman of Grupo Carso Carlos Slim, and billionaire businessman Alberto Baillères.
