= Bimbo Bakeries USA =

American subsidiary bakery company of Grupo Bimbo

Bimbo Bakeries USA, Inc.
- Type: Subsidiary
- Industry: Food processing; Food distribution
- Founded: March 15, 1998; 28 years ago Fort Worth, Texas, U.S.
- Headquarters: Horsham, Pennsylvania, U.S.
- Area served: United States
- Key people: Fred Penny (President); Daniel Servitje (Chairman and CEO)
- Products: Baked goods
- Owner: Grupo Bimbo
- Number of employees: 20,000
- Website: www.bimbobakeriesusa.com

Bimbo Bakeries USA, Inc. (Spanish pronunciation: [ˈbimbo]) is the American corporate arm of the Mexican multinational bakery product manufacturing company Grupo Bimbo. It is the largest bakery company in the United States. The subsidiary, headquartered in Irving, Texas, a suburb of Dallas, owns many fresh bread and sweet baked goods brands in the United States, including Arnold, Levy's, Ball Park, Colombo, Francisco, Oroweat, Entenmann's, Sara Lee, and Thomas'. It is also a top advertising sponsor for many major soccer teams around the globe.

== Name ==
The name "Bimbo" was first coined in 1945 when the company switched from Super Pan S.A. A blend of the words "bingo" and "Bambi", the name's innocent, childlike associations fit the image that the company wished to build.

== History ==
Grupo Bimbo, the largest baking company in Mexico, purchased California-based tortilla maker La Hacienda in 1994. Bimbo Bakeries USA then entered the U.S. bread market in 1997 with the acquisition of Pacific Pride Bakeries of San Diego.

The company grew again in 1998 with the purchase of Mrs Baird's Bakeries in Texas, which at the time was the largest family-owned bakery in the U.S. The combined operations were renamed Bimbo Bakeries USA (BBU).

In 2002, BBU acquired the Western U.S. baking business of George Weston Ltd., adding the brands Oroweat, Entenmann's, Thomas, and Boboli. In 2008, Grupo Bimbo purchased the remaining U.S. fresh baked goods business of George Weston Ltd., adding the Arnold, Brownberry, Freihofer's, and Stroehmann brands.

In 2011, BBU completed its largest acquisition to date: the Sara Lee Corporation. Adding Sara Lee's bread business doubled BBU in size.

In 2020, BBU acquired Lender's Bagels from Conagra Brands.

As of 2013, BBU operated more than 60 bakeries, employed more than 20,000 workers, and distributed products through 11,000 sales routes throughout the United States.

=== Kosher certification ===
In 2018, the company announced that it would not be renewing its Kosher certification. As the largest baking company in the US, the decision caused significant concern amongst Jews, especially those who live outside areas with significant Jewish populations. Kosher breads are required to be non-dairy unless explicitly labelled because Jewish dietary restrictions prohibit consuming dairy and meat at the same meal. Kosher bread is thus almost always pareve. The company said they wanted the option to produce bread on factory lines that might include dairy products, which they are not able to do if they remain kosher certified.

== Nationwide expansion ==
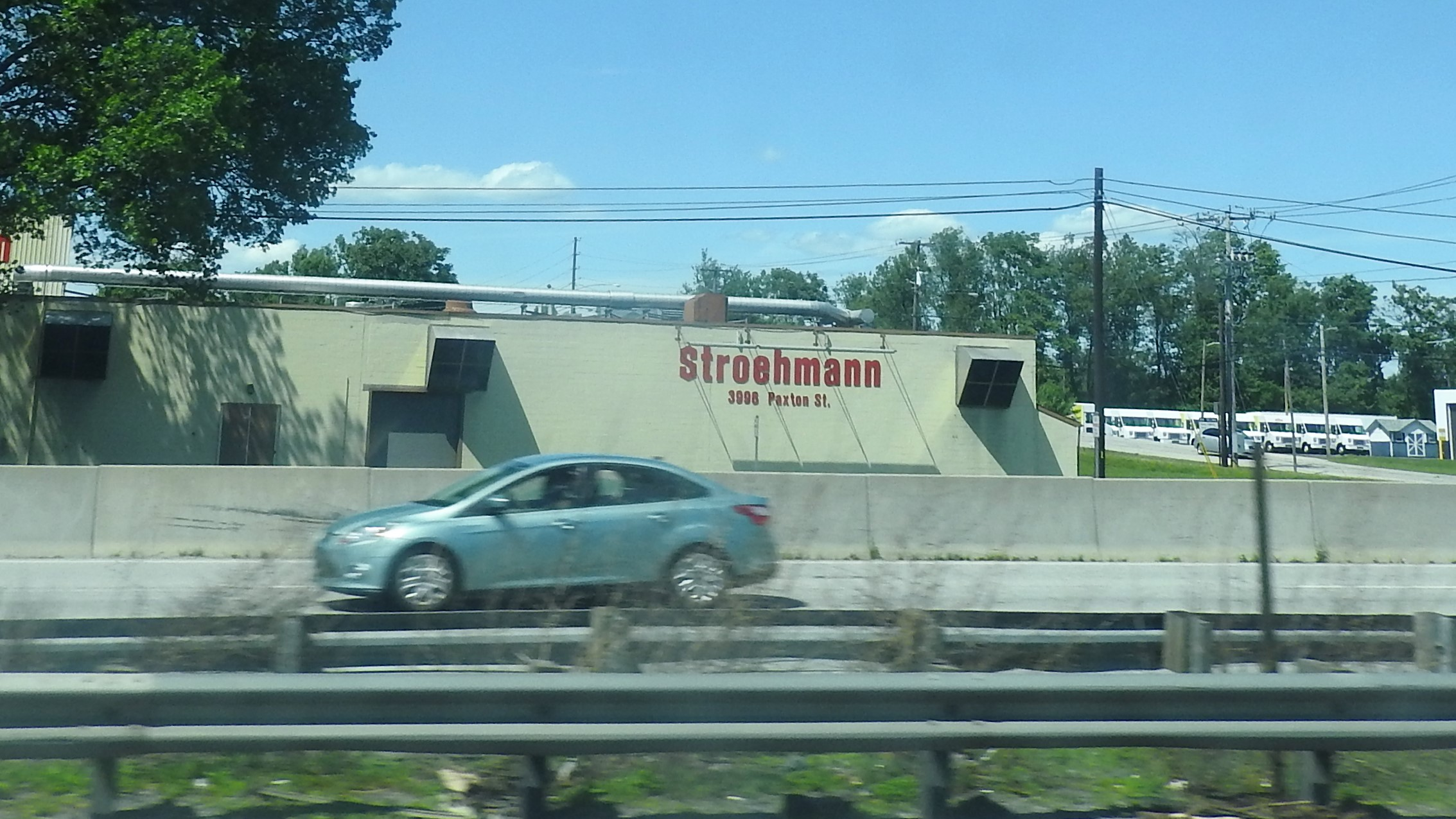
Stroehmann factory in Harrisburg, Pennsylvania

On December 10, 2008, it was announced that Grupo Bimbo was in negotiations to purchase Weston Foods Inc., a subsidiary of George Weston Ltd. for $2.38 billion, a purchase that would make Bimbo Bakeries USA the largest bakery company in the United States. The purchase was finalized on January 21, 2009. The acquisition added brands such as Arnold, Brownberry, Freihofer's, Stroehmann, and gave Bimbo the rights to the Weston brands in the eastern United States (it had controlled the Weston brands in the western United States since 2002). The purchase also added 22 factories and 4,000 delivery trucks, giving Bimbo Bakeries USA 35 factories and over 7,000 sales routes in the United States, along with a footprint in all of the lower 48 states and almost $4 billion in annual sales. The Weston Foods headquarters in Horsham, Pennsylvania (just outside Philadelphia) became the new headquarters for Bimbo's US operations, relocating from Fort Worth, Texas, when the deal closed. In April 2026, the company announced it was moving its headquarters back to the Dallas area, announcing that it was part of a long-term growth strategy.

== Soccer sponsorship ==
In an effort to increase its national exposure, on January 11, 2011, Bimbo announced a four-year partnership agreement making it the official jersey sponsor of the Philadelphia Union, the Major League Soccer (MLS) team local to their national headquarters. The Union sponsorship agreement marked the fifth professional soccer team sponsored by Bimbo; the parent company Grupo Bimbo had sponsored the following five teams: Rochester Rhinos, Club América, C.D. Guadalajara and C.F. Monterrey of the Primera División de México teams, and C.D. Saprissa of Costa Rica. The deal also makes Bimbo the official bread and baked goods sponsor of the Union and MLS. Bimbo will become an official sponsor of MLS, opening MLS League and Club marketing assets, such as stadium signage, to the company. The sponsorship deal is valued at roughly US$12 million over the four-year period.

== Sara Lee acquisition ==
On November 9, 2010, Grupo Bimbo announced that it had agreed to acquire the North American fresh bakery business of the Sara Lee Corporation. The transaction, which was subject to regulatory review, would combine the largest and third-largest baking companies in the United States, as measured by annual sales. The deal was reported as costing $959 million. This acquisition resulted in Bimbo Bakeries USA having 75 bakeries in 31 states, and serving the entire continental United States through more than 13,000 sales routes.

The acquisition was estimated to bring about $2.1 billion in sales to Bimbo Bakeries USA, for a rough total of $6 billion. This would make Bimbo Bakeries USA more than twice as large as the number-two bakery company in the United States, Flowers Foods.

Sara Lee Corp. acquired its fresh-baked division in 2001 with the acquisition of Earthgrains for a then industry record of $2.8 billion.

In November 2011, Sara Lee Corporation completed the sale of its North American fresh bakery business to Grupo Bimbo for $709 million. Sara Lee also sold its fresh-bakery businesses in Spain and Portugal to Grupo Bimbo for 115 million euros ($158.3 million), in a deal announced in October 2011. That acquisition was expected to close by the end of 2011.

Bimbo Bakeries was required to sell off some of its assets by the antitrust division of the United States Department of Justice. The following operations were sold:

- Earthgrains and Healthy Choice in Omaha were sold to Pan-O-Gold in May 2012.
- Holsum and Milano in Harrisburg and Scranton were sold to Schmidt Baking Company in May 2012.
- Sara Lee and Earthgrains in California and Earthgrains in Oklahoma City were sold to Flowers Foods in October 2012.

== Main brands ==
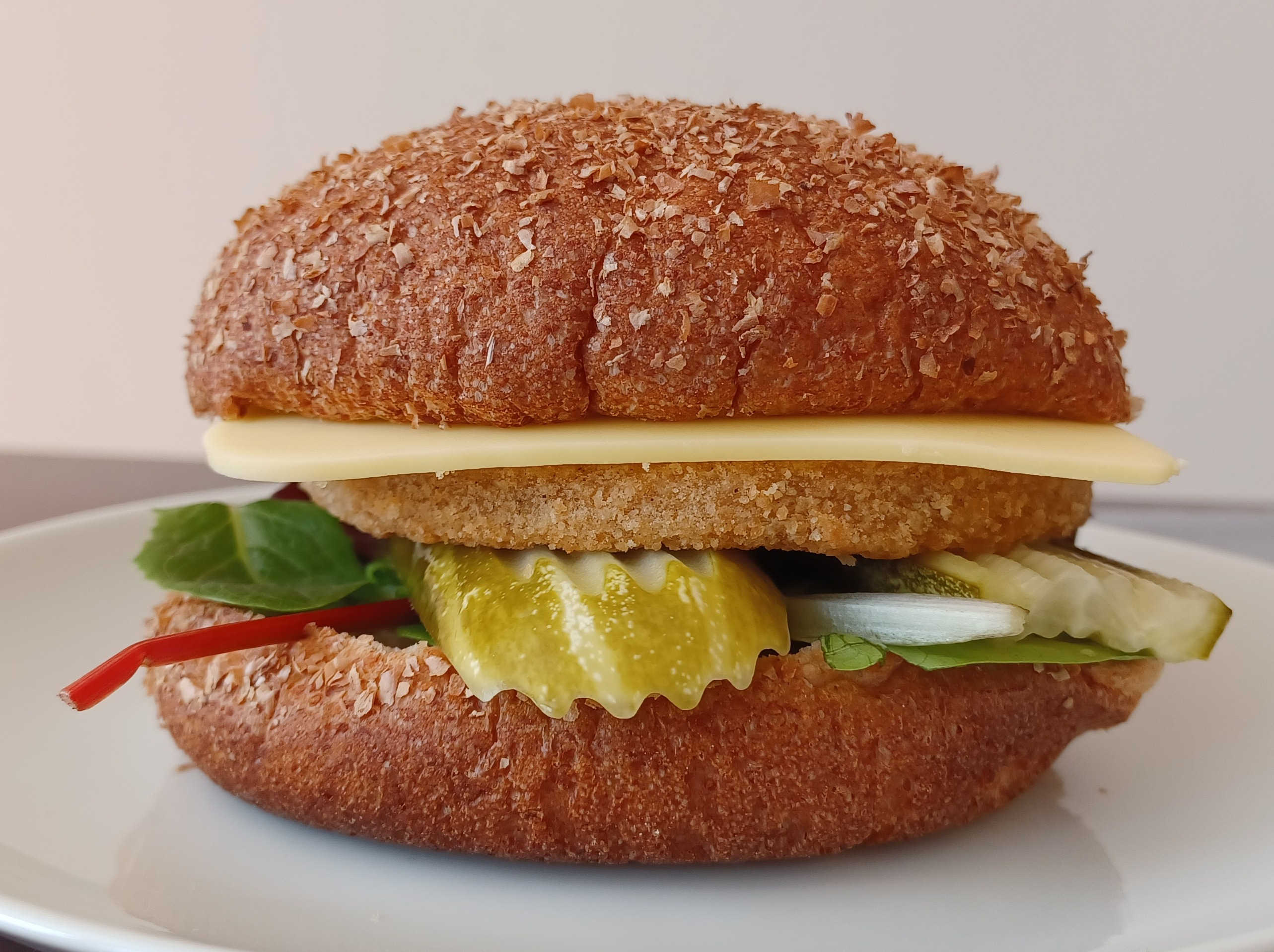
A veggieburger on an Oroweat bun

- Alfaro's Artesano – Producer of sliced bread and buns, sharing the name and likeness of the Sara Lee Artesano line
- Arnold – Producer of loaf bread primarily sold throughout the United States
- Ball Park – Producer of buns & rolls
- Barcel – Producer of Takis, Takis Kettlez, and associated varieties of snacks
- Bays – Producer of English muffins
- Beefsteak – Producer of bread
- Bimbo – Producing cakes and bread, typically found in major United States cities with large Hispanic and Hispanic-American populations
- Boboli – Producer of ready-made pizza crusts
- Brownberry – Producer of loaf bread primarily sold throughout the United States
- The Cheesecake Factory at Home – Producer of the at home "brown bread" from The Cheesecake Factory
- Colombo – Producer of sweet and sourdough bread products. Formerly Colombo Baking Company.
- EarthGrains – Producer of loaf bread primarily sold throughout the United States
- Emmy's Organics – Producer of small coconut cookies in New York
- Entenmann's – Pastry baker in the United States
- Francisco – Producer of bread and rolls
- Freihofer's – Producer of bread and cakes most commonly found in upstate New York
- Goldminer Bakery – Producer of sourdough and specialty bread, sold across the United States
- Grace Baking – Producer of artisan bread, buns, and rolls; originally established in the San Francisco Bay Area
- Grandma Sycamore's – Producer of homemade breads, based in Utah and found in the intermountain west
- Heiner's – Producer of sliced bread in West Virginia from Heiner's Bakery
- J.J. Nissen – Producer of bread commonly found in New England
- Lender's Bagels – Producer of bagels
- Little Bites – Producer of the brand of bite-sized snacks under the Entenmann's name
- Maier's - Producer of bread
- Marinela – Producer of Mexican cookies and pastry
- Mrs. Baird's – A leading bakery primarily present in Texas and surrounding states
- Nature's Harvest Bread – Producer of sliced bread in the United States
- Old Country – Restaurant bread
- Old Home - Bread brand primarily seen in the Midwest, formerly from the Metz Baking Company
- Oroweat – Producer of loaf bread primarily sold throughout the United States
- The Rustik Oven - Producer of artisan sliced bread and flatbread in the United States
- San Luis Sourdough – Producer of sourdough sold in the western United States
- Sara Lee – North America Fresh Bakery unit only
- Stroehmann – Producer of loaf bread in the United States
- Tenderflake - Producer of pie shells and pastries
- Thomas' – Producer of English muffins and bagels
- Tía Rosa – Producer of home-style bread, pastry, and tortillas
- Wholesome Harvest – Producer of sliced bread in the United States

== See also ==
- List of bakeries
- List of brand name breads
