= The Age of Debt Bubbles =

2024 economics book

- Authors: Max Rangeley, William White, Roger Köppel, Harry Richer, Miguel Fernandez Ordeoñez, Barbara Kolm, Syed Kamall
- Published: September 12, 2024
- Publisher: Springer Nature
- Pages: 153

The Age of Debt Bubbles is a book on monetary policy proposing that money creation through fractional-reserve banking makes the monetary system debt-based. The book argues that economic bubbles, higher unemployment, recessions, and depressions are caused by central banks relying on inverted yield curves and tight monetary policy.

== See also ==
- Credit theory of money
- Endogenous money
- Narrow money and Broad money
- Money multiplier
- Monetary sovereignty
- The End of Alchemy - Mervyn King book depicting money creation as a financial form of alchemy
