= Brownberry =

Brownberry may refer to:

- Brownberry (bakery), old fashioned bakery now owned by Bimbo Bakeries USA.
- Brownberry, a wolfrider in the science fiction/fantasy comic book series Elfquest.
- Brownberry Farm, one of the Ancient Tenements on Dartmoor, England.
- Brown berry, a rare tomato cultivar.
