= Harvest Gold India =

Indian Food & products company

- Company type: Private Limited Company
- Industry: Food processing
- Founded: 1981
- Headquarters: New Delhi, India
- Parent: Grupo Bimbo
- Website: harvestgold.in

Harvest Gold is an Indian food company, headquartered in New Delhi, that produces bread and its associated products. In 2017, Grupo Bimbo, Mexico's largest food and Bakery Company, bought controlling stakes in Harvest Gold.

== Origins ==
In the early 1990s, India’s packaged bread market was dominated by Modern and Britannia. Bread was sold in wax paper and consumers often queued at delivery vans. Short shelf life constrained national distribution and encouraged strong local brands. Harvest Gold was founded by Adil Hassan, a chemical engineer from IIT Delhi, and Taab Siddiqui, an MBA from Aligarh Muslim University. After marrying in 1988, they moved to Singapore and returned to Delhi in 1992, identifying a market gap for fresh, good-quality bread. With an investment of ₹1 Crore, Harvest Gold Foods India Pvt. Ltd. setup a manufacturing plant in Bhiwadi, Rajasthan and began production in June 1993 with an installed capacity of 75,000 loaves of 800 grams per day. The initial products were premium white bread in 400 g (₹7) and 800 g (₹13) packs.

Within roughly two years of launch, the firm established itself as a leading Delhi-NCR brand, reaching ₹400 million turnover in five years. By around 2010, Harvest Gold reported a turnover exceeding ₹1.2 billion and an expanded product line.

== See also ==
- Bonn Group of Industries
- Grupo Bimbo
