= IPEA =

IPEA may stand for:

- Instituto de Pensamiento Estratégico Ágora, a Mexican think tank
- Instituto de Pesquisa Econômica Aplicada (Institute of Applied Economic Research), a Brazilian government-led economy research organization
- International Preliminary Examination Authority, an examination authority under the Patent Cooperation Treaty (PCT)
- International Professional Engineers Agreement, see Regulation and licensure in engineering
