= Double Seven (soft drink) =

Indian soft drink brand

- A late 1980s ad for the brand
- Type: Cola
- Manufacturer: Modern Food Industries
- Origin: India
- Introduced: 1977; 49 years ago
- Discontinued: Yes
- Flavour: Cola
- Variants: Double Seven Tingle (lemon-lime soft drink)
- Related products: Thums Up, Campa Cola

Double Seven was an Indian soft drink brand. It was manufactured and marketed by the Indian government after Coca-Cola quit the Indian market in 1977 due to changes in government policies. Double Seven was launched at the annual trade fair at Pragati Maidan, New Delhi as a gift by the then ruling Janata Party.

In 1977, as per the provisions of the Foreign Exchange Regulation Act brought by the Morarji Desai government, Coca-Cola was required to reduce its ownership stake of its Indian operation. Coca-Cola along with other United States companies chose to leave India rather than operate under the new laws.

Developed to fill the void left by Coca-Cola, Double Seven was quickly designed, manufactured and marketed by Modern Food Industries, a government-owned company. Double Seven was the winning name in a national competition to name the drink. The formula for the concentrate of Double Seven was developed at Central Food Technological Research Institute, Mysore. Despite government backing, Double Seven could not dominate the Indian soft drinks market, but the programme was successful in filling the void left by Coca-Cola. Double Seven's main competitors were Campa Cola, Thums Up, Duke's, McDowell's Crush, and Double Cola. Double Seven also had a lemon-lime soft drink known as Double Seven Tingle.

The drink lost market share as Indira Gandhi's government came to power in 1980 and was not interested in supporting a product which reminded them of 1977, the year when Indira Gandhi lost the national elections. During this period, other drinks like Thums Up became very popular. Modern Food Industries gradually slipped into the red and was taken over by Hindustan Lever Limited in January 2000.

Thums Up, which was also launched in 1977 after the departure of Coca-Cola, continued to thrive until its eventual takeover by Coca-Cola.

== See also ==
- List of defunct consumer brands
