= Watertown Subdivision =

Railway line in Wisconsin

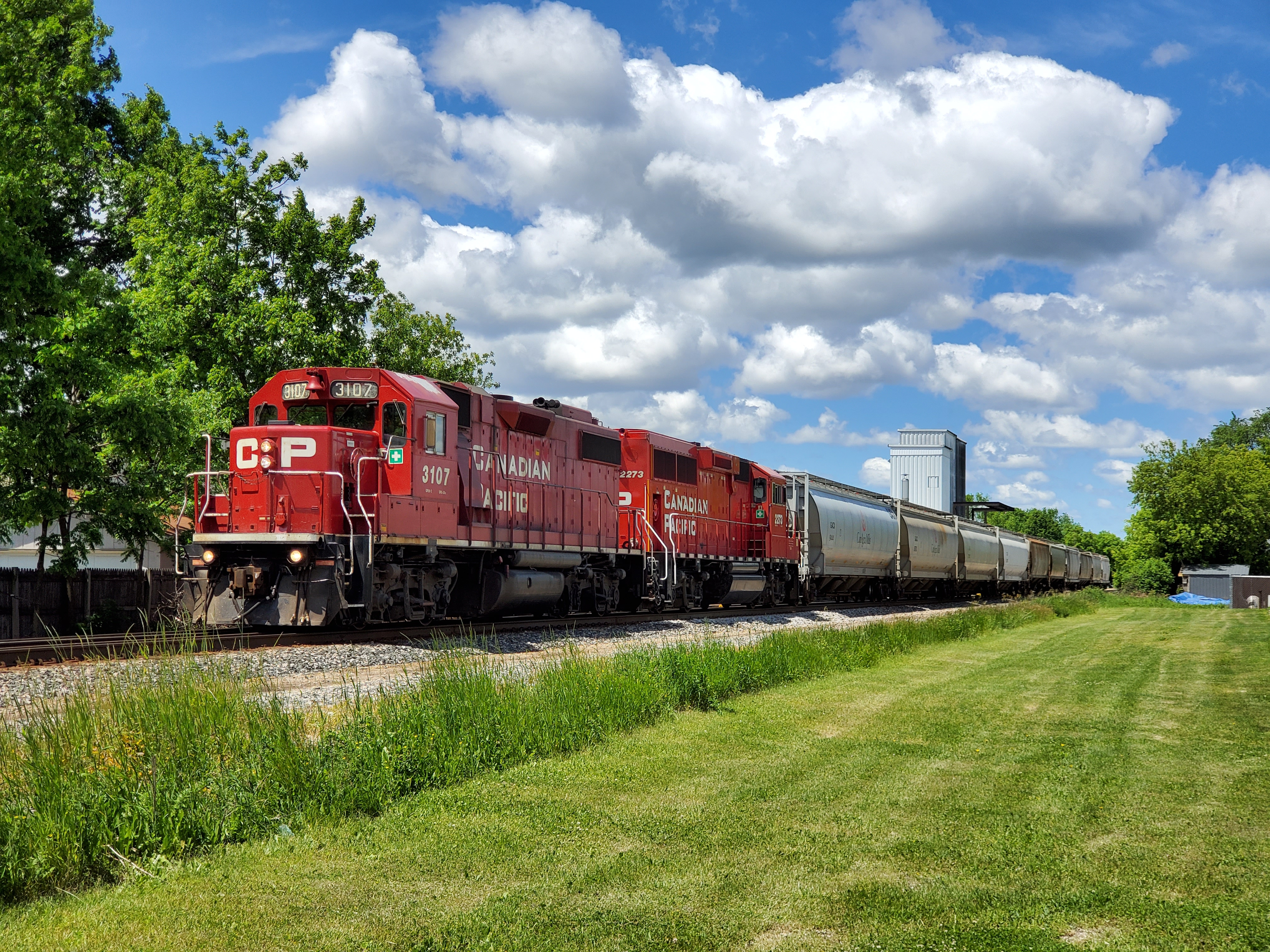
- The Watertown Sub local in Oconomowoc switching cars from an industrial spur owned by Brownberry

Overview
- Status: Active
- Owner: Canadian Pacific Kansas City Limited
- Locale: Wisconsin
- Termini: Portage; Milwaukee

Service
- Type: Freight, passenger
- Operator(s): Canadian Pacific Kansas City Limited, Amtrak

History
- Commenced: 1850
- Completed: 1864

Technical
- Line length: 92.7 mi (149.2 km)
- Number of tracks: 1–2
- Track gauge: 4 ft 8 1/2 in (1,435 mm) standard gauge

The Watertown Subdivision or Watertown Sub is a 92.7-mile (149.2 km) railway line in Wisconsin operated by Canadian Pacific Kansas City (CPKC) through its primary United States subsidiary, the Soo Line Railroad. It meets CPKC's Tomah Subdivision in the west in Portage and runs to Milwaukee in the east where it meets the C&M Subdivision. The Watertown Subdivision had previously been operated by the Chicago, Milwaukee, St. Paul and Pacific Railroad (CMStP&P/Milwaukee Road), though the Soo Line Railroad took it over when the Milwaukee Road folded. Canadian Pacific gained ownership via taking over the Soo Line. CP consolidated its operations with the Kansas City Southern Railway on April 14, 2023, to form CPKC.

== History ==
This line contains the oldest stretch of track in Wisconsin, constructed by an early incarnation of the CMStP&P, the Milwaukee and Mississippi Railroad. Track was laid between Milwaukee and Brookfield in 1850. The initial line then turned southwest from Brookfield and went toward Waukesha. The first passenger train ran between Milwaukee and Waukesha on February 25, 1851. The next segment of the present subdivision was finished between Brookfield and Watertown in 1855, and continued partway to Portage in 1857. This line didn't reach its present western end at Portage until 1864, though an alternate route farther north that ran through Iron Ridge and Horicon, Wisconsin, had reached the city in 1856.

Farther to the west, today's Tomah Subdivision was quickly built from Portage to La Crosse, Wisconsin, in 1857 and 1858. The line finally crossed the Mississippi River into neighboring Minnesota in 1866. This was the second line of the Milwaukee Road to reach the Mississippi. The original rail line to Waukesha had been expanded through Milton and Madison, and reached Prairie du Chien in 1867.

In 1935, the Milwaukee Road introduced the Hiawatha passenger train which ran at high speed between Saint Paul, Minnesota, and Chicago. It was one of the fastest passenger trains in the world at the time. When Amtrak took over passenger service in the United States in 1971, the former Great Northern Empire Builder was redirected to run along the Hiawatha's route between Chicago and Minneapolis–Saint Paul, Minnesota. Until 1972 the line saw commuter service between Milwaukee and Watertown on the Cannonball line.

== Current operations ==
Around 20–25 trains run on the Watertown Subdivision a day, with four of them being Amtrak's Empire Builder and Borealis passenger trains; numbers 7 and 1333 (westbound) and 8 and 1340 (eastbound). Stops exist in Portage, Columbus, and Milwaukee. The Amtrak Hiawatha, which now runs between Milwaukee and Chicago, was expected to be extended to Madison with stops in Watertown, Brookfield, and possibly another city. Initial plans to include a stop in Oconomowoc were dropped. However, these plans never came to fruition following then governor Scott Walker returning the funds to the federal government for use on passenger rail projects in other states.

Among the many mainline freight trains that run through the area, CP G64 stands out as the only local that serves the Watertown Subdivision. Also known as the patrol train, it switches freight cars from many industrial spurs from Portage to Milwaukee. The train also often goes to Madison via the M&P Subdivision, and to a ballast pit in Waterloo via the Wisconsin and Southern Railroad's own Watertown Subdivision.
