= M&P Subdivision =

Railway line in Wisconsin

Overview
- Status: Active
- Owner: Canadian Pacific Kansas City
- Locale: Wisconsin
- Termini: Portage; Madison

Service
- Type: Freight
- Operator(s): Canadian Pacific Kansas City

History
- Completed: 1870

Technical
- Line length: 32.2 mi (51.8 km)
- Number of tracks: 1
- Track gauge: 4 ft 8 1/2 in (1,435 mm) standard gauge

The Madison and Portage Subdivision, commonly referred to as the M&P Subdivision or M&P Sub, is a 32.2-mile (51.8 km) railway line running between Madison, Wisconsin and Portage, Wisconsin. It is operated by the Canadian Pacific Kansas City through its primary United States subsidiary, the Soo Line Railroad. The line branches off of the Watertown Subdivision to the north in Portage, and runs south to a Wisconsin and Southern Railroad interchange in Madison.

The line was built in 1870 by the Madison and Portage Railroad. It eventually fell under the ownership of the Chicago, Milwaukee, St. Paul and Pacific Railroad; commonly known as the Milwaukee Road. After its merger into the Soo Line Railroad in 1986 following bankruptcy, the line was one of the few to Madison to not go up for abandonment. It continued to be owned by Soo Line until 1990, when Canadian Pacific gained full control of the line.

The line is all single track and is used only for freight, with a number of industrial spurs located along the line. They store freight cars, mostly hoppers and tank cars, that are switched out by the local train, CP G64, approximately three times a week.

The M&P subdivision is slated to serve new Amtrak service as a part of the Twin Cities–Milwaukee–Chicago (TCMC) project. It will be a connection between Madison and the Tomah Subdivision as trains travel toward the Twin Cities.
