= Martha Entenmann =

American businesswoman (1906–1996)

Martha Entenmann (1906–1996) was an American businesswoman known for her role in developing Entenmann's bakery into one of the largest baked-goods companies in the United States.

Born Martha Schneider in Hoboken, New Jersey, she was employed at a bakery in Bay Shore, New York, when she married the owner, William Entenmann Jr., in 1925. Following her husband's death in 1951, she and her sons restructured the company, discontinuing bread and roll production and home delivery, and shifting focus toward cakes, pies, and pastries distributed through supermarkets. Entenmann also expanded its operations beyond Long Island to cities such as Miami and Chicago.

Entenmann actively managed company finances and operations alongside her sons until retiring around 1981. When Entenmann's went public in 1976, her image appeared on the company's stock certificates. The company was subsequently acquired by Warner-Lambert in 1978, then by General Foods in 1982, and became part of Kraft Foods after Philip Morris purchased General Foods in 1985. In 1995, Entenmann's was sold to CPC International.
