= Heiner's Bakery =

Bakery in Huntington, West Virginia

Coordinates: 38.413216°N 82.478418°W

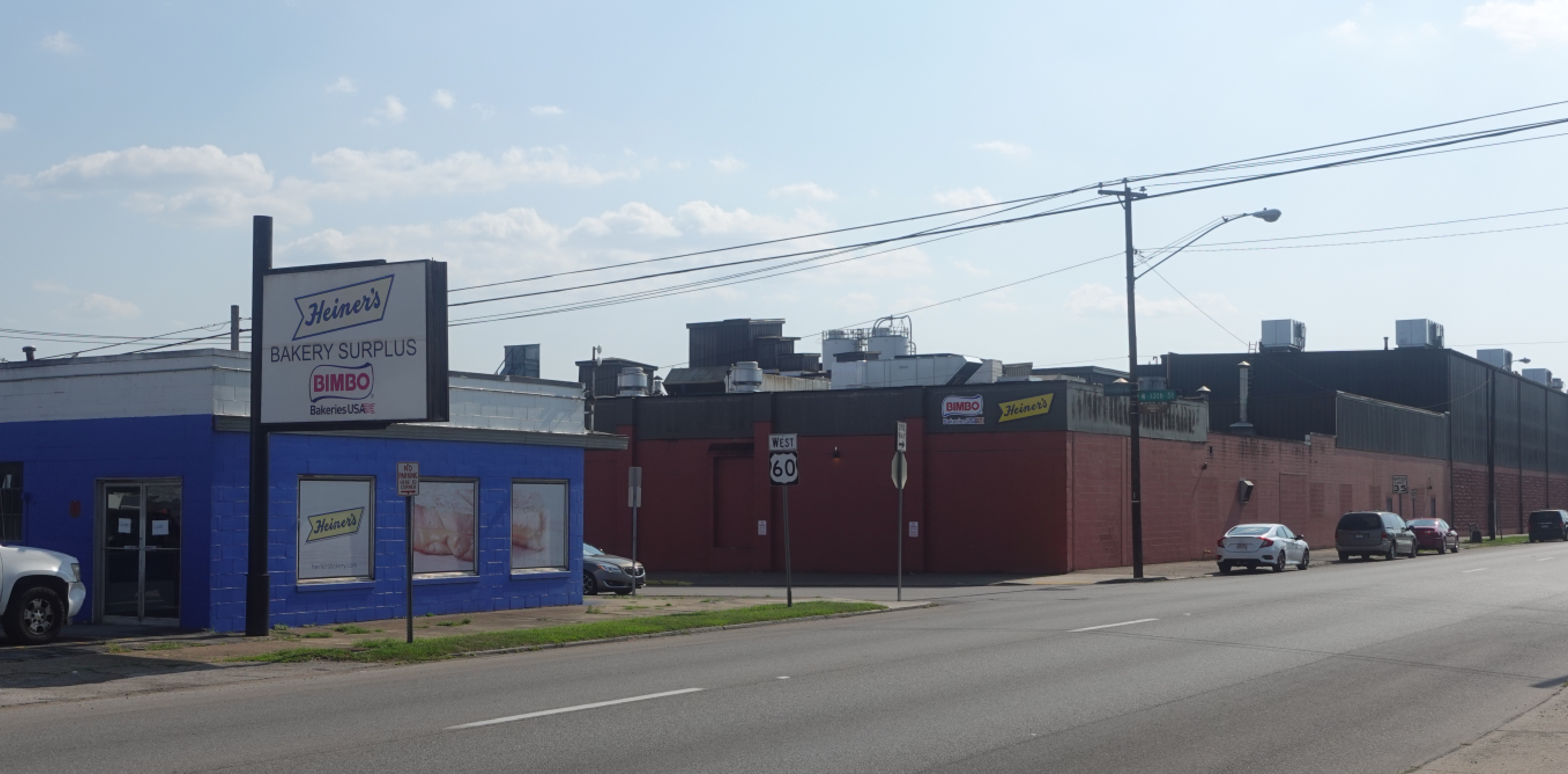
- Heiner's Bakery in 2024.
- Company type: Subsidiary of Grupo Bimbo
- Industry: Bakery
- Founded: 1905; 120 years ago in Huntington, West Virginia, United States
- Founder: Charles W. Heiner
- Website: heinersbakery.com

Heiner's Bakery (est. 1905) is a commercial bakery located in Huntington, West Virginia, which distributes baked goods within a range of about 200 miles from that location.

The bakery was privately owned by the Heiner family, and marketed exclusively under the "Heiner's" label until it was acquired by the Earthgrains division of Anheuser-Busch in 1994. Seven months later, A-B spun off its bread business as the stand-alone Earthgrains Corporation. In 2000, Earthgrains merged with the Sara Lee Corporation. In 2011, Sara Lee sold its bread business, including the trademark Sara Lee, to the worldwide Grupo Bimbo, which is based in Mexico City.

Heiners Baker was listed on the National Register of Historic Places, under the 14th Street West Historic District, in 2024.
