= 14th Street West Historic District =

Historic district in West Virginia, US

- U.S. National Register of Historic Places
- U.S. Historic district
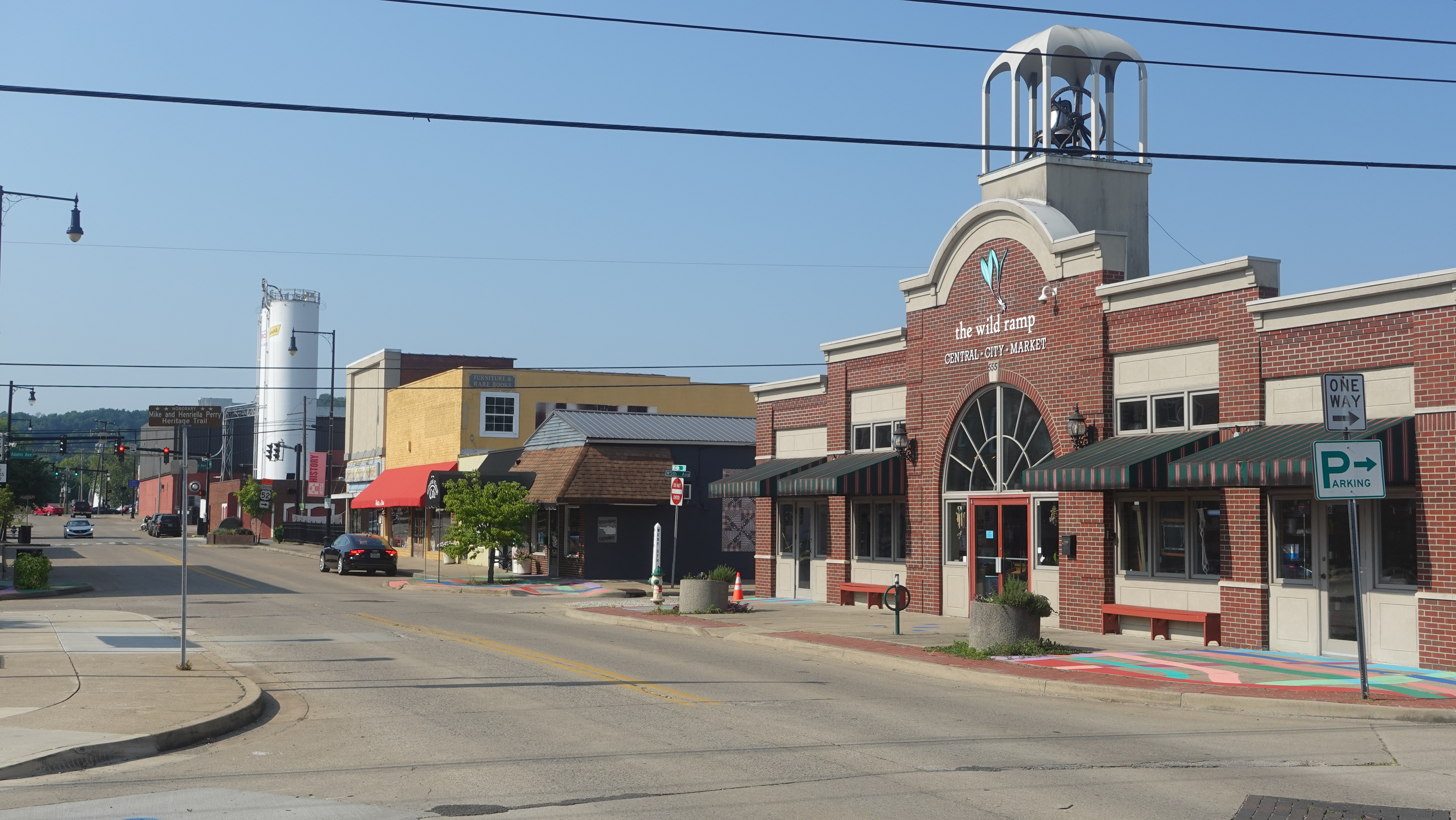
- 14th Street West Historic District in 2024.

- Location within West Virginia Location within the United States
- Location: Roughly bounded by Madison Ave, Virginia Avenue, 15th Street West, and 13th Street West, Huntington, West Virginia
- Coordinates: 38°24′43″N 82°28′47″W
- Area: 120 acres (49 ha)
- Architect: Multiple
- Architectural style: Mid-Century Modern Colonial Revival
- NRHP reference No.: 100010590
- Added to NRHP: July 19, 2024

14th Street West Historic District, also known as Central City, is a national historic district located at Huntington, West Virginia. The district encompasses 29 contributing buildings including Heiner's Bakery. Dwellings in the district represent the finest styles in Colonial Revival and Mid-Century Modern architecture.

It was listed on the National Register of Historic Places in 2024.

== History ==
Central City was founded as a town that manufactured and created artisan items using the materials produced by the natural resource extraction industries in the area.

== Notable buildings ==
- Central City Market (c. 1996)
- Heiner's Bakery (c. 1905)
- Henrietta Payne Memorial Boys Club (c. 1917)
- Huntington Fire Station 4 (c. 1905)
- Old Central Gazebo (c. 1992)
- Overby Building (c. 1930)

== Gallery ==
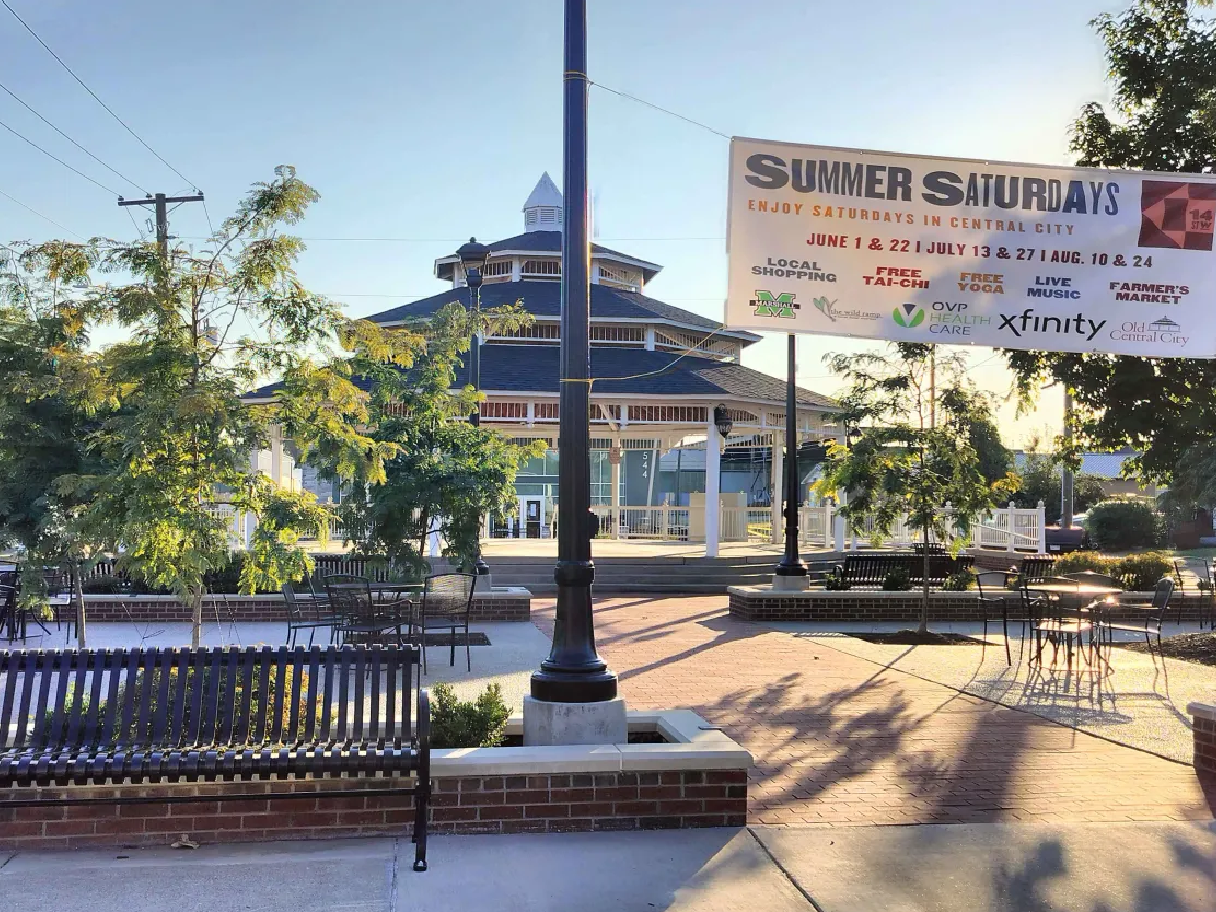
Central City gazebo in 2024.

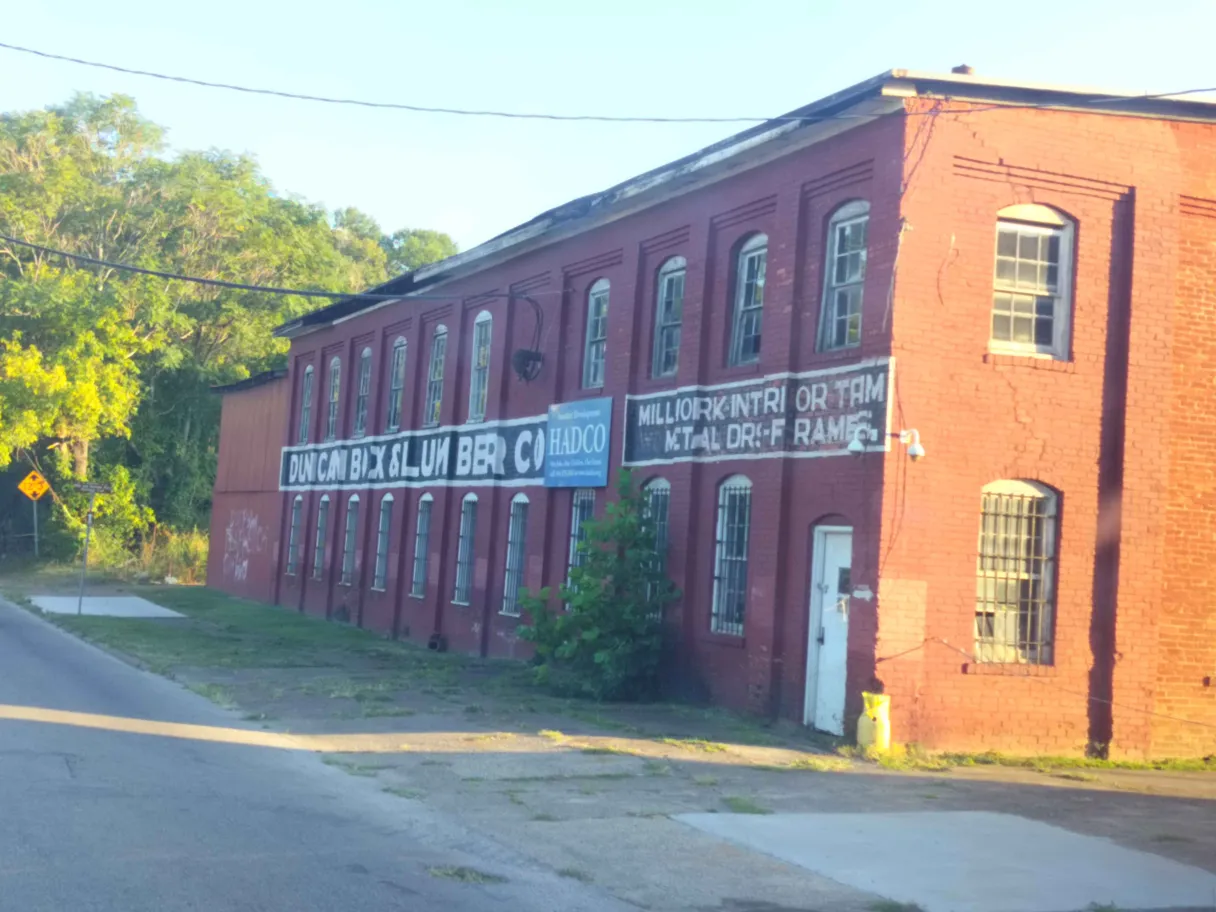
Duncan Box & Lumber in 2024.

== See also ==
- List of neighborhoods in Huntington, West Virginia
- National Register of Historic Places listings in Cabell County, West Virginia
