= Harriet Mayor Fulbright =

American arts administrator

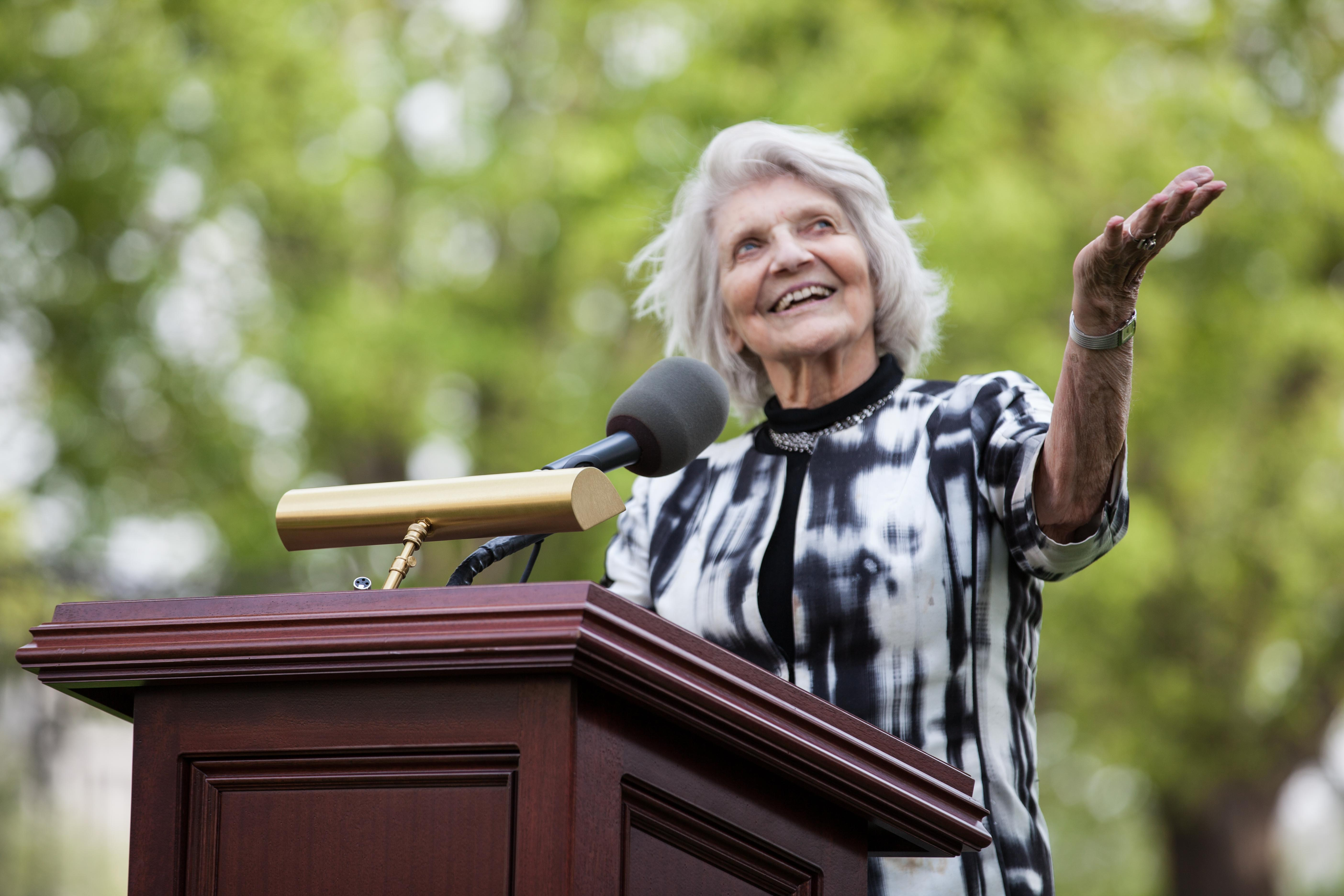
- Fulbright in 2016
- Born: Harriet Anna Mayor; December 13, 1933; New York City, New York, U.S.
- Died: September 26, 2023 (aged 89); Durham, North Carolina, U.S.
- Education: Radcliffe College; George Washington University
- Occupation: Executive
- Spouses: William Watts (m. 1953, divorced); J. William Fulbright (m. 1990; died 1995)
- Children: 3
- Relatives: Archer Mayor (brother)

Harriet Anna Mayor Fulbright AM (December 13, 1933 – September 26, 2023) was an American nonprofit executive who was the president of the J. William and Harriet Fulbright Center and board president of Harriet Fulbright College. She was the second wife, and widow, of United States Senator J. William Fulbright. Mayor was the Executive Director of the President's Committee on the Arts and Humanities under President Bill Clinton.

== Early life and education ==
Harriet Fulbright was born in New York City, New York on December 13, 1933. Her father, Brantz Mayor, worked for Time Magazine. She has five siblings, one of whom is bestselling mystery author Archer Mayor. The family moved often during Fulbright's youth and as a consequence, she spent much of her childhood in Washington, D.C., New York City and Toronto, Ontario, Canada.

Her first overseas experience was at the age of 14, when she traveled to Colombia for a summer study program. She continued her education at Radcliffe College, the women's college counterpart to Harvard University, where she earned her Bachelor of Arts in 1955. In 1975, Fulbright earned her MFA from the George Washington University in Washington, D.C.

Fulbright married William Watts in 1953 and gave birth to three daughters. The family spent two years each stationed in the USSR and South Korea and one year in Germany. She taught English in each country and would continue to teach for many years to come.

== Life with Senator Fulbright ==
In 1987, Mayor served as the Executive Director of the Fulbright Association and moved the headquarters from Bryn Mawr, Pennsylvania to Washington, D.C. Senator Fulbright was on the board of the Fulbright Association at the time and the two began spending time together. The two were married on March 10, 1990, in a private ceremony at Senator Fulbright's home in Washington when JW Fulbright was 83 years old.

After marrying, the two traveled for two years before JW Fulbright suffered from the first of several strokes before his death. Notable trips included a journey to Japan for the publication of Fulbright's autobiography, Against the Arrogance of Power: My Personal History, Moscow and Germany after the fall of the Berlin Wall and Hawaii. Near the end of January 1992, Senator Fulbright suffered the last of many strokes. He died on February 9, 1995.

== Later activities ==
Harriet Fulbright served as an "unofficial ambassador" for the Fulbright Program and was often invited to speak at events that range from university commencements to milestone anniversaries for Fulbright Commissions around the world who are celebrating the presence of her late husband's educational exchange program in their respective countries. As a result of her status as an international figure of peace and education, she received many awards and honorary degrees. She sat on the advisory board of the Alliance for Peacebuilding. In 2006, she created the J. William & Harriet Fulbright Center, a nonprofit dedicated to promoting peace through international education and furthering her husband's legacy. Fulbright celebrated her 75th birthday in Washington. She died in September 2023.

== Awards and honors ==
Type	Bestower	Date
Honorary Doctorate of Law	University of Scranton	1996
Honorary Doctorate of Humane Letters	Long Island University	1997
Order of Manuel Amador Guerrero	The Government of the Republic of Panama	1997
Honorary Doctorate of Humane Letters	Bank Street College of Education	2000
Arts in Education Award	Fillmore Arts Center	2001
Middle Cross of the Order of Merit	The Republic of Hungary	2002
Honorary Doctorate of Humane Letters	University of Development Studies, Ghana	2004
Hubert H. Humphrey Humanities Award	Association of Teachers of Social Science	2004
Rotary Person of the Year Award	Rotary International	2005
Honorary Benet Fellow of the School of International Studies	Oklahoma State University	2006
Honorary Member of the Order of Australia	The Governor-General of Australia	2006
Honorary Degree in Humane Letters	Pace University	2006
Honorary Doctorate in Philosophy and Physics	Stevens Institute of Technology	2006
