= Mathias Entenmann =

- Born: Heidelberg, Germany
- School: Bunsen-Gymnasium Heidelberg
- University: University of Karlsruhe
- Occupation: Director

Rugby union career
- Position(s): Flank; No.8
Amateur team(s)
Years	Team	Apps	(Points)
until 1988	RG Heidelberg		
1988	Windhoek Wanderers		
1989	RG Heidelberg		
1990-1991	FC Kronenb./Strassb.		
1992-1994	Kowloon RFC		
1995-1999	RG Heidelberg		
International career
Years	Team	Apps	(Points)
1987-1990	W-Germany	12	
1990-1992	Germany	14	
1993	Hong Kong		
1994-1998	Germany		
National sevens teams
Years	Team		Comps
1990-1992	Germany		
1993	Hong Kong 7s		
1994-1998	Germany		

Mathias Entenmann is a retired German rugby player, who played flank and No. 8 for the German national team from 1988 to 1998. He also played for the Germany sevens team, which enjoyed some successes in the 1990s.

Entenmann was a member of German teams which competed in Rugby World Cup qualification matches and the erstwhile FIRA Tournaments. He was also part of the Germany sevens squads, which won the Bowl final of the 1990 Hong Kong Sevens, reached the Plate Final of the 1997 Punta Del Este Sevens, and won the Bowl Final of the 1997 Paris Sevens.

Mathias Entenmann played for Hong Kong during the year 1993, including the 1993 Hong Kong Sevens.

He hails from Heidelberg, and played club rugby for the Rudergesellschaft in Heidelberg, with whom he played in numerous German Championship finals, winning the Championship in 1996.

He was the chairman of the organising committee of the Oktoberfest Sevens were inaugurated in 2017. The event was covered nationwide on television on channel Sport1. Demonstrating its prowess as organisers and the acceptance of both, participating nations and spectators, is a declared mean to the end of hosting a tournament of the World Rugby Sevens Series.

He featured again publicly in 2018 in a different capacity: He was appointed as the high-profile member of a negotiation team of three for the German Rugby Federation aiming to resurrect relations with its estranged donor Hans-Peter Wild. A first meeting was coordinated by Mark Egan, senior executive at World Rugby in early April 2018. These negotiations and the possible subsequent availability of professional German rugby players to the German national rugby union team have added meaning due to the renewed possibility of Germany qualifying for the 2019 Rugby World Cup.

Mathias Entenmann studied industrial engineering at the University of Karlsruhe. After retiring from rugby, he founded the paybox.net AG in 1999, where he achieved great success with mobile payment services. He then became Vice President International of eBay's PayPal subsidiary in Europe and Asia, advanced to being Chief Products and Services Officer at Betfair Ltd in London before he finally joined Loyalty Partner, a vendor of Loyalty programs in June 2011 as Chief Operating Officer.
