= Grupo Bimbo =

Mexican multinational food company

Grupo Bimbo, S.A.B. de C.V.
- Logo used since 2015

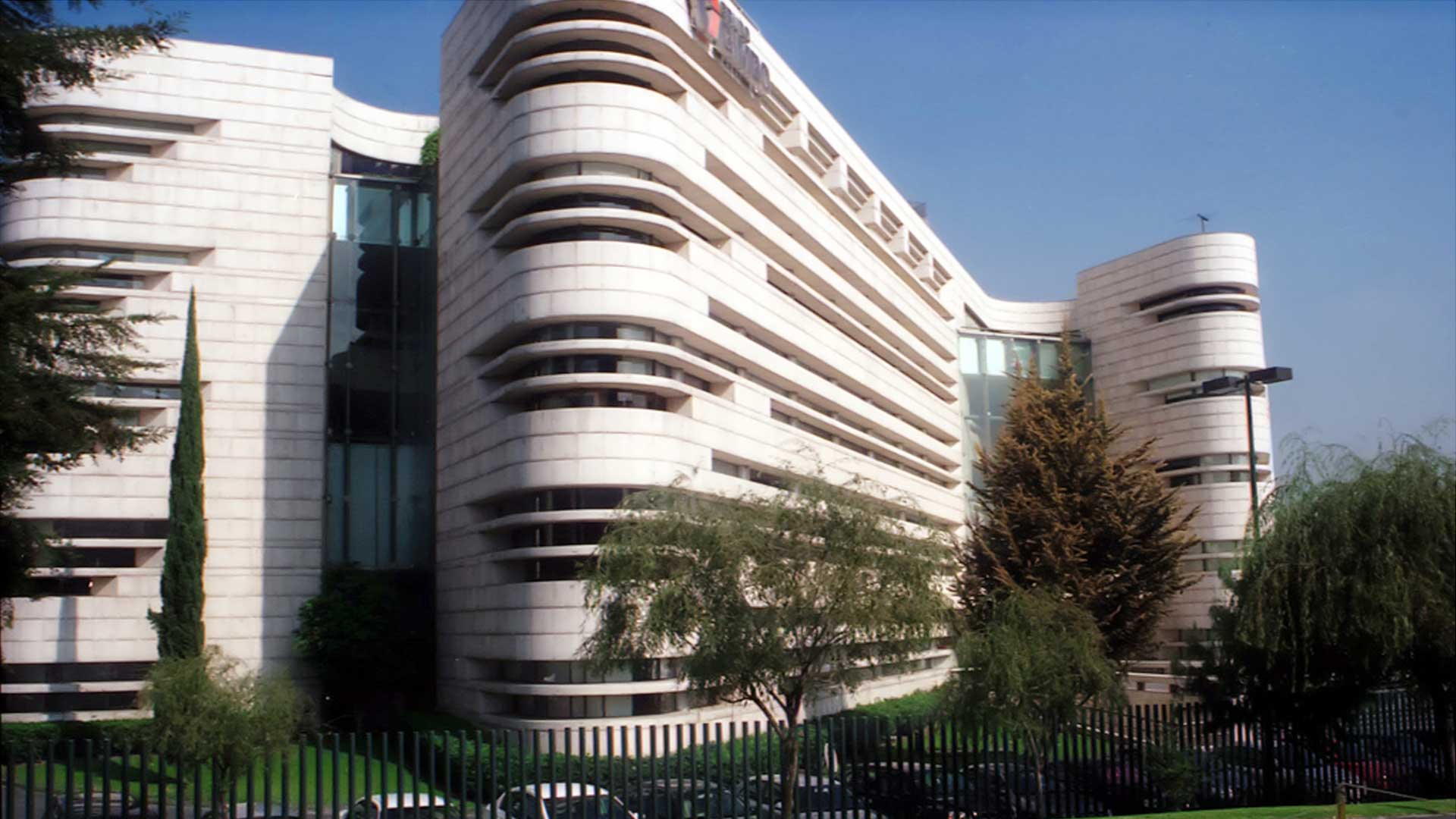
- Headquarters in Mexico City
- Formerly: Panificación Bimbo S.A. (1945–1986); Grupo Bimbo, S.A. de C.V. (1986–2006)
- Type: Public
- Traded as: BMV: BIMBO
- Industry: Food processing
- Founded: 2 December 1945; 80 years ago
- Founders: Lorenzo Servitje; Jaime Jorba; Jaime Sendra; Alfonso Velasco; José T. Mata
- Headquarters: Mexico City, Mexico
- Area served: Worldwide
- Key people: Daniel Servitje (chairman)
- Products: Bread; Cookies; Pastries
- Brands: Bimbo; Marinela; Tía Rosa; Ideal; Barcel; Sara Lee; Mrs Baird's; Oroweat; +100 other brands
- Revenue: ▲MXN$348.8 billion US$17.1 billion (2021)
- Operating income: ▲MXN$185.3 billion US$9.1 billion (2021)
- Net income: ▲MXN$43.1 billion US$1.7 billion (2021)
- Total assets: ▲MXN$337.6 billion US$16.6 billion (2021)
- Total equity: ▲MXN$101.6 billion US$5.0 billion (2021)
- Number of employees: 137,000
- Divisions: BIMBO Bakeries USA; BIMBO México; Barcel; BIMBO Canada; BIMBO China; BIMBO Latin Sur; BIMBO Latin Centro; BIMBO Brasil; BIMBO Europa; Canada Bread Company; Harvest Gold India; Modern Food Industries
- Website: grupobimbo.com

Grupo Bimbo, S.A.B. de C.V. (also known simply as Bimbo) is a Mexican multinational food company with a presence in over 33 countries located in the Americas, Europe, Asia and Africa. It has an annual sales volume of 15 billion dollars and is listed on the Mexican Stock Exchange with the ticker BIMBO. It is considered the largest bakery in the world (although some sources contested this claim with the Japanese Yamazaki Baking Company).

Grupo Bimbo has 137,000 employees, 196 bakery plants, 3 million points of sale, a distribution network with 57,000 routes all over the world. The company has more than 100 brands and 13,000 products, like Bimbo, Tía Rosa, Entenmann's, Pullman, Rainbo, Nutrella, Marinela, Oroweat, Sara Lee, Thomas', Arnold and Barcel. Its strategic associations include Alicorp (Peru); Blue Label (Mexico); Fincomún, Galletas La Moderna, Grupo Nutresa (Colombia); Mundo Dulce (Argentina); among others.

Daniel Servitje has been Grupo Bimbo's chairman since 2013.

== History ==
=== 1945–1960 ===
Bimbo logo used on 1940s to 1960s

Grupo Bimbo began operations in Mexico City on December 2, 1945, with Panificación Bimbo, S.A. as the official name. The company started with 34 employees, selling cellophane-wrapped large and small white loaf bread, rye bread, and toast bread. Lorenzo Servitje Sendra, José T. Mata, Jaime Sendra Grimau, Jaime Jorba Sendra, and Alfonso Velasco, were the partners who started the bakery company.

The name "Bimbo" was chosen among other candidates such as PanRex, Pan NSE (initials in Spanish for Nutritious, Tasty, and Inexpensive), Sabrosoy, Pan Lirio, and Pan Azteca. The name was formed as the combination of the Disney Bambi and Dumbo films names, which were the favorite movies of Marinela, Lorenzo Servitje's daughter. Later, the founders would find out that bimbo is an Italian slang for children (shortened from bambino), and that in China the word for bread (面包, miànbāo) is similar to the name of the brand.

The brand's ambassador, the Bimbo Bear (Osito Bimbo), was also created in 1945. It was inspired by a bear drawing in a Christmas Card given to Jaime Jorba. Anita Mata, Jaime Sendra's wife, was the one who added distinct features such as the hat, the apron, and the bread under its arm.

By 1948, Grupo Bimbo had nine different products like white bread, toast bread, black bread, sweet bread, buns, and muffins. Thanks to the production growth, in 1949, the first branch outside of Mexico City was opened in the city of Puebla.

By the 1950s, Grupo Bimbo took its products to more people with the "38", a delivery truck with speakers that helped promote the products. Shortly afterward, the portfolio extended with the addition of Bimbo Bear Donuts, Bimbollos (hamburger bread), Medias Noches (hot dog bread), and Colchones.

On its tenth anniversary, in 1955, Grupo Bimbo had 700 employees and 140 vehicles. In 1956, the company opened Bimbo de Occidente (Bimbo of the West) factory with Roberto Servitje as its general manager, and, in 1958, launched Gansito, a chocolate-covered snack cake filled with strawberry jelly and whipped cream.

=== 1961–1980 ===
In the 1960s, Grupo Bimbo kept expanding with its arrival in Monterrey, Nuevo León, and its first administrative restructuring in 1963, which led to the creation of its corporate structure. A year later, in 1964, the company acquired the rights in Mexico of Quality Bakers of America's brand, Sunbeam.

In the 1970s, the company had significant growth in several areas. In 1971, Barcel, one of its most important brands, began operations; In 1972, it opened its bakery plant located in Azcapotzalco, Mexico City, the largest in Latin America and one of the ten largest in the world, at the time.

During this decade, Grupo Bimbo entered the marmalade market with Mermelada Carmel (1973); inaugurated Suandy and Tía Rosa (1974), began the production of Conchas Bimbo (1975); and launched Ricolino, the company's leading sweets and chocolate brand, and Bubulubu with it (1978). By the end of the 1970s, Grupo Bimbo was formed by three companies, 12 plants, and 15,000 employees; during this time, Roberto Servitje was appointed CEO.

=== 1981–2000 ===
At the beginning of the 1980s, Grupo Bimbo presented relevant internal and external changes. It started quoting on the Mexican Stock Exchange, trading 15% of its shares, and a new organizational structure was generated in 1986, from which a single industrial group was created. In these years, exports to the United States of America began (1984); Bimbo Centroamérica was created in 1989 with the construction of a plant in Guatemala, which was completed in 1990. the company had previously operated in the 1980s in Guatemala and El Salvador through the Winni brand which would later become Marisela in those countries.

In the early 1990s, Milpa Real tortillas, Candy Max and Lonchibon were added to its brands. In 1993, opened its new corporate building in Santa Fe, Mexico City, and in 1995, acquired Cajeta Coronado, an enterprise specialized in cajeta-based products. During this decade a further expansion in Latin America took place, with the arrival of Bimbo in Argentina and the opening of the regional corporate in 1991, as well as the Ideal plant in Chile in 1995. In 1994, Grupo Bimbo purchased La Hacienda, a tortilla maker in California expanding its operations in the U.S. market. In 1997, it furthered its US based offerings to the U.S. bread market with the purchase of Pacific Prides Bakery, San Diego, California and, in 1998 when it purchased Mrs Baird's Bakeries in Texas, Bimbo Bakeries USA (BBU) was born.

Finally, in 1997, Daniel Servitje was appointed the company's CEO, setting a new course for Grupo Bimbo's operations worldwide.

=== 2001–2010 ===
At the beginning of the 21st century, Grupo Bimbo added brands such as Plus Vita and Pullman in Brazil (2001); Joyco, Alimentos Duval and Lolimen, the manufacturers of Duvalín, Bocadín and Lunetas (2004); Pastelería El Globo and Chocolates La Corona (2005); and Nutrella of Brazil (2008) to its portfolio. it also introduced the Olocoons figures and animated television series which has become a culture classic towards the public in Mexico and Central America.

In 2006, Groupo Bimbo began operations in the Asian market with the acquisition of the Panrico Bakery in Beijing, China. The company also strengthened its presence in the United States of America with the acquisition of George Weston Limited bakery, owner of brands such as Thomas, Oroweat, Arnold, Boboli, Stroehmann and Freihofer's in 2009.

=== 2011–present ===
In this decade, Grupo Bimbo consolidated itself as the largest bakery company in the world by acquiring Sara Lee North American Fresh Bakery in the United States; Fargo in Argentina; Dulces Vero in Mexico; and Bimbo Iberia in Spain and Portugal, in 2011. A year later, the company completed its most important conversion to renewable energy with the inauguration of the Piedra Larga wind farm (in the city of Oaxaca), which supplies several of Grupo Bimbo's facilities, as well as its electric vehicles fleet with "green" energy.

In the following years, Grupo Bimbo acquired several companies to boost its global growth strategy, some of the most prominent were: in 2014, Canada Bread (Canada) and Supan (Ecuador); in 2015, Vachon (Canada); and, in 2016, Panettiere (Colombia), General Mills (Argentina) and Panrico S.A.U. (Spain and Portugal).

In 2017, the company began operations in Africa and continued its growth in the continent, with the acquisition of Groupe Adghal in Morocco; East Balt, one of the most important foodservice companies in China, France, Italy, Morocco, Russia, South Africa, South Korea, Switzerland, Turkey, Ukraine, and the United States; and by purchasing 65% of the Ready India Private Limited's (Ready Roti) shares. This year, Grupo Bimbo added to its portfolio brands like Bays English Muffins (United States) and Stonemill Bakehouse (Canada).

In 2018, the company continued its expansion and completed the purchase of Nutra Bien brands in Chile and El Paisa in Colombia, in order to grow in South America; Grupo Mankattan, a leader in the baking industry in China, thriving its growth in the fast-food channel in that country. That same year, Grupo Bimbo joined the RE100 initiative, committing to being 100% renewable, energy-wise, by 2025. It also became the first Mexican company to issue Clean Energy Certificates for Distributed Generation.

In 2019, it kept promoting some of its corporate social responsibility initiatives like the Good Neighbor program, Reforestamos México (Reforestation), and Limpiemos México (Clean-up). Among these campaigns, Without Leaving a Trace stood out, with which Grupo Bimbo committed that 100% of its packaging will be recyclable, biodegradable, and/or compostable by 2025.

In February 2020, Grupo Bimbo expanded its operations and arrived in Kazakhstan, through Bimbo QSR (Quick Service Restaurants), a strategic association agreement was signed with Food Town, the exclusive supplier of buns and McDonald's franchisee in that country. With this agreement, the company expanded its presence to 33 countries.

In May 2022, Grupo Bimbo agreed to sell its confectionery business, Ricolino, to the Chicago-headquartered food processing company, Mondelēz International for approximately US$1.3 billion. The sale was completed in November of that same year.

In October 2022 the Manchester-based bakery St Pierre was taken over by Grupo Bimbo, in a deal worth more than £300m.

In April 2024, Rafael Pamias was appointed as CEO. Daniel Servitje remains as Chairman of the Board of Directors.

In November 2025, Grupo Bimbo announced Alejandro Rodríguez Bas as its new Chief Executive Officer. He succeeded Rafael Pamias Romero, who stepped down earlier the same year to address personal and health matters.

== Corporate structure ==
Grupo Bimbo is composed, in a first tier, of a Shareholders' Meeting, whose task is to appoint the members of the Board of Directors, which must be made up of a minimum of 5 directors and a maximum of 21; 25% of them should be independent agents. The following tier is the Steering Committee, which is established as follows:

Chairman of the Board of Directors: Daniel Javier Servitje Montull

CEO: Alejandro Rodríguez Bas

Executive Vice Presidents: Javier Augusto González Franco

Gabino Miguel Gómez Carbajal

Rafael Pamias Romero

Chief Financial Officer: Diego Gaxiola Cuevas

Global People Director: Juan Muldoon Barrena

Global Vice President of Information and Transformation: Raúl Ignacio Obregón Servitje

== Acquisitions ==
- 1964: Sunbeam - Quality Bakers of America (license in Mexico)
- 1995: Cajeta Coronado (Mexico), Grupo Ideal (Chile)
- 1998: Mrs. Baird's (United States)
- 2001: Plus Vita, Pullman (Brazil)
- 2002: George Weston Limited (United States)
- 2004: Joyco, Alimentos Duval, Lolimen (Mexico)
- 2005: Pastelería El Globo, Chocolates La Corona (Mexico)
- 2006: Panrico (China)
- 2008: Nutrella (Brazil)
- 2009: George Weston Foods Ltd. (United States)
- 2010: Dulces Vero (Mexico)
- 2011: Sara Lee North American Fresh Bakery (United States), Fargo (Argentina), Bimbo Iberia (Spain and Portugal)
- 2014: Canada Bread (Canada), Supán (Ecuador)
- 2015: Vachon Bakery, Italian Home Bakery (Canada)
- 2016: Panettiere (Colombia), General Mills (Argentina), Panrico S.A.U. (Spain and Portugal)
- 2017: Grupo Adghal (Morocco), East Balt Bakeries (United States), 65% of Ready India Private Limited's shares (India)
- 2018: Nutra Bien (Chile), El Paisa (Colombia), Mankattan Group (China)
- 2021: Modern Group (India), Kitty Bread (India), Popcornopolis (United States)
- 2023: Vel Pitar (Romania)

== Global sales ==
Figures in millions of nominal Mexican pesos (MXN).

Year	Total Net Sales	Total Assets	Total Liabilities	Capital	Ref.
2012	$173,139	$137,140	$90,082	$47,058	
2013	$176,041	$134,727	$86,944	$47,783	
2014	$187,053	$177,761	$124,159	$53,602	
2015	$219,186	$199,633	$137,774	$61,859	
2016	$252,141	$245,165	$170,089	$75,076	
2017	$267,515	$259,249	$182,225	$77,024	
2018	$288,266	$263,316	$178,741	$84,575	
2019	$291,926	$279,081	$200,770	$78,311	

== Sustainability ==
Grupo Bimbo manages its environmental actions through the platform A Sustainable Way, formed by four strategic pillars:

=== Carbon ===
Grupo Bimbo set itself the objective of minimizing its environmental impact through the improvement and consolidation of technologies related to renewable energy, energy efficiency, and compensation of resources. To achieve this, the company joined the RE100 pact, committing itself to be 100% renewable by 2025 (energy-wise). The RE100 climate program is made up of large multinational companies to boost their processes with natural energy.

Grupo Bimbo uses air energy provided by wind farms: Piedra Larga (Mexico), Santa Rita East (USA), and three in Argentina. The first, located in the state of Oaxaca, has an installed capacity of 90 MW, which provides energy to 70% of its work centers in Mexico and avoids the annual emission of 180,000 tons of CO_{2} into the atmosphere. For its part, the second is located in Texas, has a capacity of 100 MW, and supplies 100% renewable energy to its operations in the United States.

The bakery has the largest electric vehicle fleet in Mexico and one of the most robust in Latin America. It currently has 42 hybrid utility cars and more than 500 electric delivery vehicles, the latter developed by Moldex, a Grupo Bimbo's subsidiary that provides technological solutions. The company committed to growing its electric fleet in Mexico and incorporating 4,000 electric cars by 2024, 1,000 during each year.

Grupo Bimbo also developed Bimbo Solar, a self-supply system inaugurated in 2018 to install solar roofs, more than 71 distributed generation systems, with a capacity of 25 MW, and thus avoid the emission of approximately 21,000 tons of CO_{2}. annually. This program stands out for having a solar roof with 308 panels, in the Grupo Bimbo corporate building in Mexico City; the largest solar roof in Mexico, and the second in Latin America in its Metropolitan Distribution Center; as well as one of the largest solar roofs in Chile.

=== Water ===
Grupo Bimbo focuses its efforts to reduce the water footprint under the following lines of action: reduction of consumption; water treatment and reuse; and new technologies. The company fostered responsible use through dry cleaning techniques, semi-wet formats, or steam. The result of this process has saved the equivalent to 186,000,000 liters since 2016.

The company has standardized the treatment and reuse of water for green areas' irrigation, sanitary services, and vehicle washing. Grupo Bimbo reports that 82% of the water used worldwide is treated in its plants and has also incorporated rainwater in 108 work centers that, during 2019, collected more than 2.5 million rainwater liters worldwide.

=== Waste ===
Grupo Bimbo launched, in 2019, the "Without Leaving a Trace" campaign, to minimize its impact on the environment. Through a Comprehensive Waste Management strategy, the company focuses on packaging innovation, waste reduction and reuse, and post-consumer management. The main goal of this strategy is that, by 2025, 100% of its packaging are recyclable, biodegradable, and/or compostable.

To achieve this, the company has committed to continuously improve its packaging, making use of new technologies to reduce the impact on the environment. Currently, all Grupo Bimbo's packaging in Mexico that can incorporate d2w technology (under the ASTMD 6954-18 standard) is already biodegradable. Additionally, in 2019, Grupo Bimbo developed its first 100% compostable packaging for the brand Vital, which has the OK Compost certificate, for domestic and industrial processes, issued by the TÜV institute in Austria, meaning that it biodegrades and is naturally reintegrated into the environment.

Throughout its value chain, Grupo Bimbo promotes actions to reduce and recycle waste. Its goal is to achieve, at least, 90% waste recycling in its global operations. To achieve this, today it has 43 plants with zero waste to landfills and 144 plants with more than 80% recycling, and it has implemented circular economy projects.

The company also takes part in different post-consumer programs that promote recycling in countries such as Mexico, the United States, Canada, Spain, Portugal, and Brazil.

=== Natural capital ===
Grupo Bimbo has promoted an environmental strategy, collaborating with suppliers, focused on caring for biodiversity. The company works with strategic suppliers, small and medium enterprises (SMEs) in soy, sesame, and palm traceability programs; with the International Maize and Wheat Improvement Center (CIMMYT) in various sustainable agriculture programs.

Grupo Bimbo focuses on maintaining an environmental balance and, therefore, promotes initiatives such as Reforestamos México AC, created in 2002, whose mission is the conservation of forest ecosystems. From 2012 to 2019, this organization has managed to plant 96,609 trees in various Mexican locations and, in the last year, collaborated with 90 companies to reforest 133.95 hectares of forests in 12 different entities.

== See also ==
- Economy of Mexico
- List of bakeries
- List of companies traded on the Bolsa Mexicana de Valores
- List of Mexican companies
