= J. William and Harriet Fulbright Center =

American non-profit

The J. William & Harriet Fulbright Center is a non-profit, non-governmental organization based in Washington, D.C., whose mission is to "...foster peace and justice through collaboration."

== History ==
In 2006 Harriet Mayor Fulbright founded The J. William & Harriet Fulbright Center.

== Mission ==
The center is not related to the Fulbright Scholarship Program, aside from the Fulbright Name. The center was founded by United States Senator J. William Fulbright and his wife, current center president Harriet Mayor Fulbright, and supports international collaborations among students, teachers, and schools, and culturally immersive programs for scholars and world leaders.

== Global Symposium of Peaceful Nations 2009 ==
The Global Symposium of Peaceful Nations, the first forum aimed at recognizing and honoring the most peaceful countries in the world took place November 1–3 at the Renaissance Mayflower Hotel in Washington, D.C.

The two most peaceful nations in each of the nine regions were identified by the 2009 Global Peace Index and were honored at the Global Symposium of Peaceful Nations. These countries included:

- Western Europe: Denmark and Norway
- Central & Eastern Europe: Slovenia and Czech Republic
- Middle East & North Africa: Qatar and Oman
- Sub-Saharan Africa: Botswana and Malawi
- Oceania: New Zealand and Australia
- East Asia: Japan and South Korea
- South & Southeast Asia: Singapore and Vietnam
- South America: Chile and Uruguay
- North & Central America and the Caribbean: Canada and Costa Rica

The Symposium gathered the most peaceful nation to celebrate, learn, and lead. The Symposium offered an opportunity to examine peacefulness and develop insights on the history, policies and characteristics of the most peaceful nations. Each country was represented by two delegates- one from civil society and one from the government.
