= Modern Food Industries =

Indian Food & products company

Modern Food Industries (India) Ltd
- Industry: Bakers
- Founded: 1965
- Headquarters: Gurgaon, Haryana, India
- Products: Bread, cakes, Rusk, Cookies
- Parent: Grupo Bimbo
- Website: www.modernfoods.co.in

Modern Food Industries (India) Ltd (MFIL) was set up in 1965 as Modern Bakeries (India) Limited and owned by Government of India. It was situated at Kazhikundram, Taramani (Near Tidel Park), Chennai, Tamil Nadu. It was set up under the Colombo plan. It was disinvested by the Government of India to Hindustan Unilever Limited in 2000 under the Premiership of Atal Bihari Vajpayee. It got its present name in 1982. MFIL had bread manufacturing units in 13 cities spread across India. MFIL had also marketed fruit juice concentrate under brand name Rasika in Delhi. MFIL also produced aerated soft drinks under the brand Double Seven. MFIL was a wholly owned Central Government-owned PSU. This was the first privatisation of public sector unit by the government of India. Modern Foods had over 40% of the bread market in India.

HUL was the sole bidder for Modern Foods. It paid Rs 10.5 million, as per the valuation exercise undertaken by its valuer ICICI, for 74% of the shares. Later the government exercised its put option to sell the remaining 26% to HUL for Rs 4.4 million in November 2002. In 2006, HUL merged MFIL with itself. Senior HUL officials said the acquisition was a complete misfit with the HUL culture and systems. The company had admitted that the acquisition was a mistake on account of improper due diligence.

In 2001, HUL referred MFIL to Board of Industrial and Financial Reconstruction. Subsequently HUL decided to sell the company to Singapore-based Everstone Capital Asia in April 2016. In February 2021, it was acquired by Mexican bakery company Grupo Bimbo.
