= Brownberry (bakery) =

Old fashioned bakery now owned by Bimbo Bakeries USA

Coordinates: 43.1078842851826°N 88.49410599589461°W

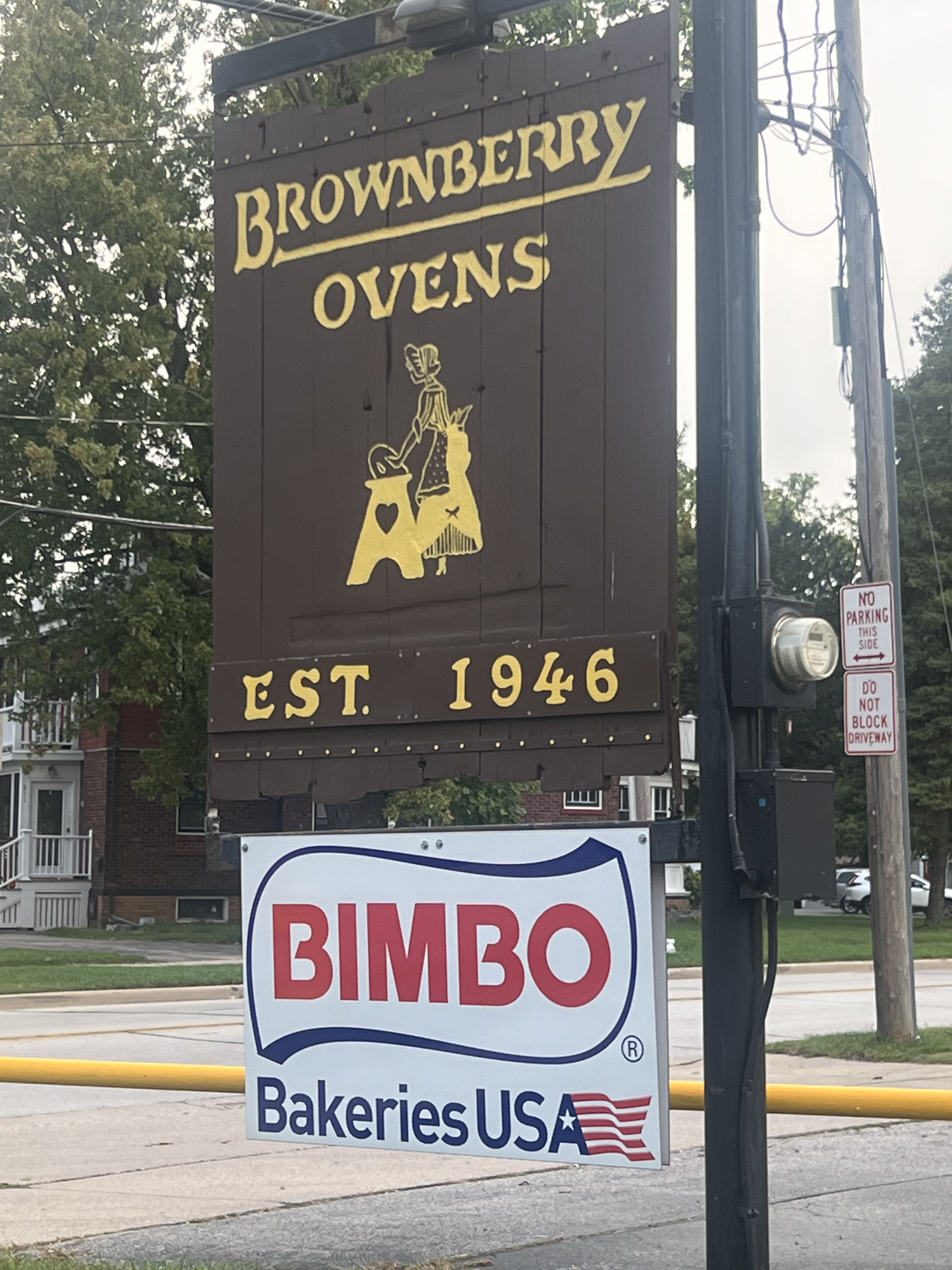
- Formerly: Brownberry Ovens
- Industry: Bakery
- Founded: 1946
- Founder: Catherine Clark
- Headquarters: Oconomowoc, WI, US
- Parent: Bimbo Bakeries USA

Brownberry is a bakery located in Oconomowoc, Wisconsin. Established in 1946, the bakery is best known for its wheat bread. The company has changed management several times, and as of 2026 is owned by Bimbo Bakeries USA.

== History ==
Brownberry was created by Catherine Clark in 1946. Clark had been baking bread for her family and friends. Her friends and family urged her to sell the bread. Clark and her husband mortgaged their home for $7,000 to open Brownberry Ovens. Clark came up with the name by watching the bread come out of the oven and said it looked “Brown as a berry”. That was how Brownberry was born. Clark originally baked batches of 25 loaves daily in her home kitchen on Summit Avenue. Then she set her ovens up in an old store building, bought a second hand truck for deliveries, and hired two assistants to help her with the labor of kneading and baking. The net profit from the first year was $86. The sales doubled annually as the years progressed. Clark ultimately built a $400,000 plant in Oconomowoc.

In 1953, they built a 20,000 square foot bakery, followed in rapid succession by three 10,000 square foot additions. The additions have continued up to the present time.

Clark sold Brownberry Ovens to the Peavey Company in 1973 for $5.5 million. She remained chairman of the board of Brownberry and became the first woman to serve on the Peavey board of directors.

In 1996, Brownberry was sold for $146 million. In Clark's own words, her goals were, from the beginning to create a "certain kind of product, not the every day or the ordinary, not a copy of the competition, not something just a little bit better." Brownberry has never had a money-losing year.

In an attempt to create a broader name recognition across the country, George Weston Bakeries assisted the bakery in having all products bear the name Arnold by the end of 2008. The name change helped get the bakery broader distribution to the northeast and southeast parts of the country. Brownberry changed the recipe of the bread, which was changed back after complaints. Arnold, like Brownberry, enjoys a long history, having begun in 1940 by Dean and Betty Arnold. In 23 years, Brownberry has gone through six mergers to become what it is today. The bakery produces and ships more than 1 million pounds of bread every week. Brownberry made $115 million in 2013.

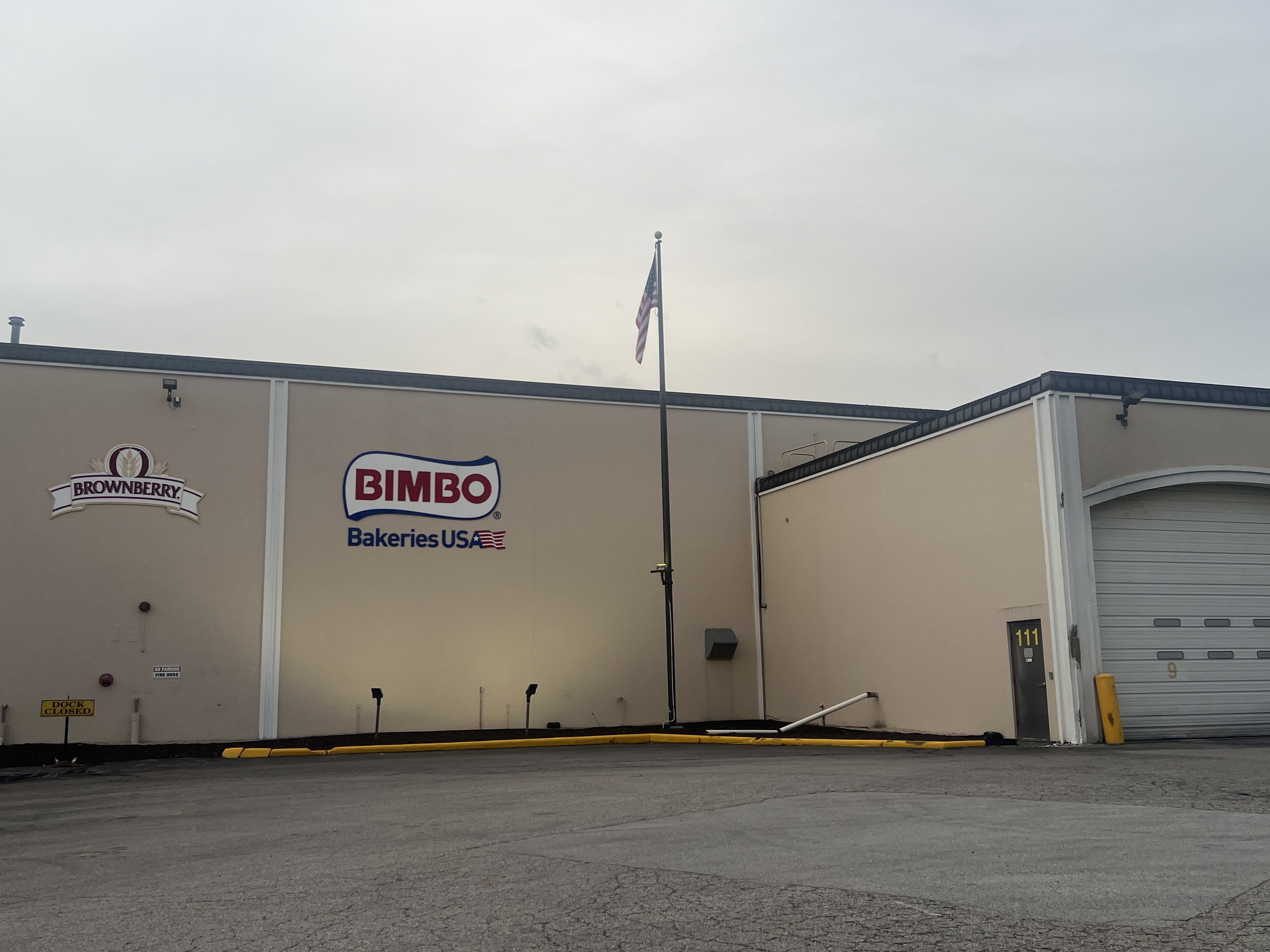

In 2026, Bimbo Bakeries began selling all Arnold and Brownberry breads under the Oroweat brand, discontinuing use of the Brownberry brand.

== Rail service ==
The Canadian Pacific Railway's Watertown Subdivision runs parallel to Brownberry. An industrial spur on the north side of the bakery allows hopper cars filled with grain to be switched out. This usually happens on Sundays, Tuesdays, and Thursdays by a local CP freight train. There are always around 4–6 empty or full cars parked in the spur.
