= Thomas' =

Brand of bread products in North America

Thomas' logo

Thomas' is a brand of English muffins and bagels in North America, established in 1880. It is owned by Bimbo Bakeries USA, one of the largest baking companies in the United States, which also owns Entenmann's, Sara Lee, Stroehmann, and Arnold Bread companies. Advertisements for the muffins place emphasis on their "nooks and crannies". The company also produces toasting or swirl bread, pitas, wraps, and bagels.

== History ==
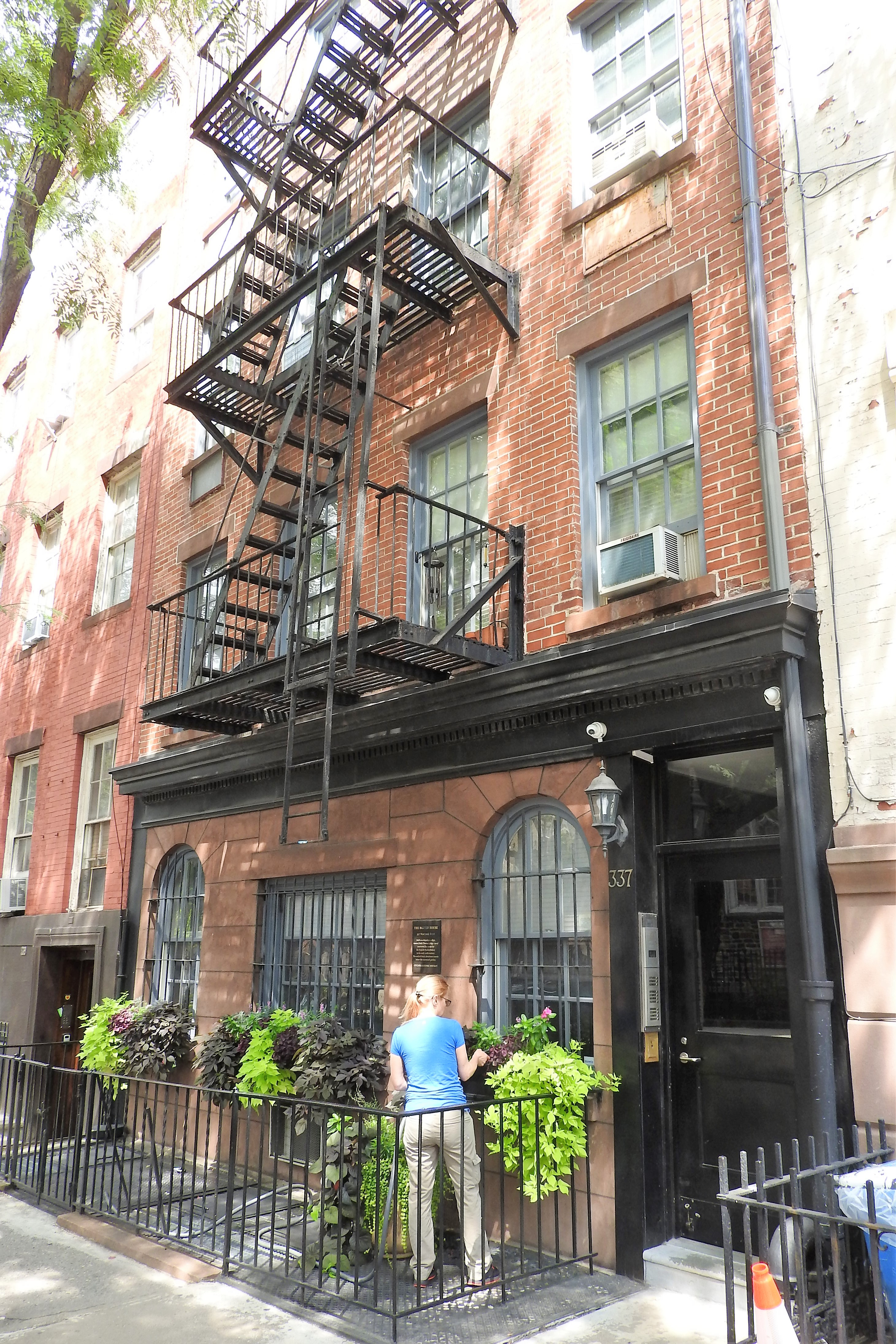
The "Muffin House" in Manhattan, home of Samuel Bath Thomas' second bakery, and ancestor of Thomas' English Muffins

The company was founded by Samuel Bath Thomas (1855–1919), who emigrated from England to New York City in 1874 and after other menial jobs began working in a bakery. By 1880, he had purchased a bakery at 163 Ninth Avenue in Manhattan, where he featured his namesake griddle-cooked muffins. The business expanded to 337 West 20th Street, today designated with a plaque as "The Muffin House". Thomas died in 1919, and the company, S. B. Thomas, was inherited by his daughter and nephews, and was incorporated. Later, it was owned by George Weston Bakeries.

Some television commercials for the muffins have highlighted the immigrant story of Thomas, joking about how disappointed his fans in England supposedly were when he decided to take his muffins to America. (Whether the muffins were invented after Thomas had moved to the U.S. is unclear, but the chiding in the commercials is not intended to be accurate, merely humorous.)

In 2010, the company won a trade secret suit when an executive uploaded the company's recipes then went to work for Hostess. Annual sales in 2010 for Thomas' English Muffins were estimated to be US$500 million.

== See also ==
- List of brand name breads
