= Charles E. Entenmann =

American executive (1929–2022)

- Born: Charles Edward Entenmann; July 2, 1929; Islip, New York, U.S.
- Died: February 24, 2022 (aged 92); Hialeah, Florida, U.S.
- Occupations: Businessman, executive, baker
- Spouse: Nancy Lee Drake (m. 1951; died 2014)
- Children: 3

Charles Edward Entenmann (July 12, 1929 - February 24, 2022) was an American business executive. He and his two brothers along with their mother ran Entenmann's bakery.

== Early life and education ==
Entenmann was born July 12, 1929 in Islip, New York, the second of three children, to William Charles Entenmann Jr. (1903–1951) and Martha Clara Entenmann (née Schneider; 1906–1996). Both his parents were first-generation Americans with his paternal grandparents hailing from Leutenbach, Baden-Württemberg. His siblings were William Charles Entenmann III (1928–2016) and William J. Entenmann (1931–2011).

== Personal life ==
In 1951, Entenmann married Nancy Lee Drake (1930–2014), a daughter of Arthur Kimball Drake and Hazel Drake (née Lee), of Bay Shore, New York. They were introduced while attending Bay Shore High School. They had three children;

- Susan Entenmann, married Robert Nalewajk
- Barbara Entenmann, married Thompson
- Charles Entenmann, married Wendy

Entenmann died at Hialeah, Florida aged 92.
