= Bubu Lubu =

Mexican chocolate brand

Nutritional value per 1 piece, 1.23 oz (35 g)
- Energy: 126 kcal (530 kJ)
- Carbohydrates: 26 g
- Sugars: 23 g
- Dietary fiber: 0 g
- Fat: 2 g
- Saturated: 2 g
- Trans: 0 g
- Protein: < 1 g
Vitamins and minerals
| Minerals | Quantity %DV^{†} |
| Sodium | 1% 25 mg |
- Other constituents: Quantity
- Energy from fat: 18 kcal (75 kJ)
- Cholesterol: 0 g
- ^{†}Percentages estimated using US recommendations for adults, except for potassium, which is estimated based on expert recommendation from the National Academies; Source: Wrapper

Bubu Lubu is a popular brand of chocolate bars from Mexico, featuring a strawberry and marshmallow filling with a chocolate covering. Invented in 1978, it is manufactured by Mondelez International via Ricolino. In the United States, Bubu Lubu are sold in many Mexican grocery stores and international supermarkets. Bubu Lubu is often eaten frozen.

== See also ==
- Paleta Payaso, a chocolate lollipop made by Ricolino
