= Barbara Kolm =

Austrian economist and politician (born 1964)

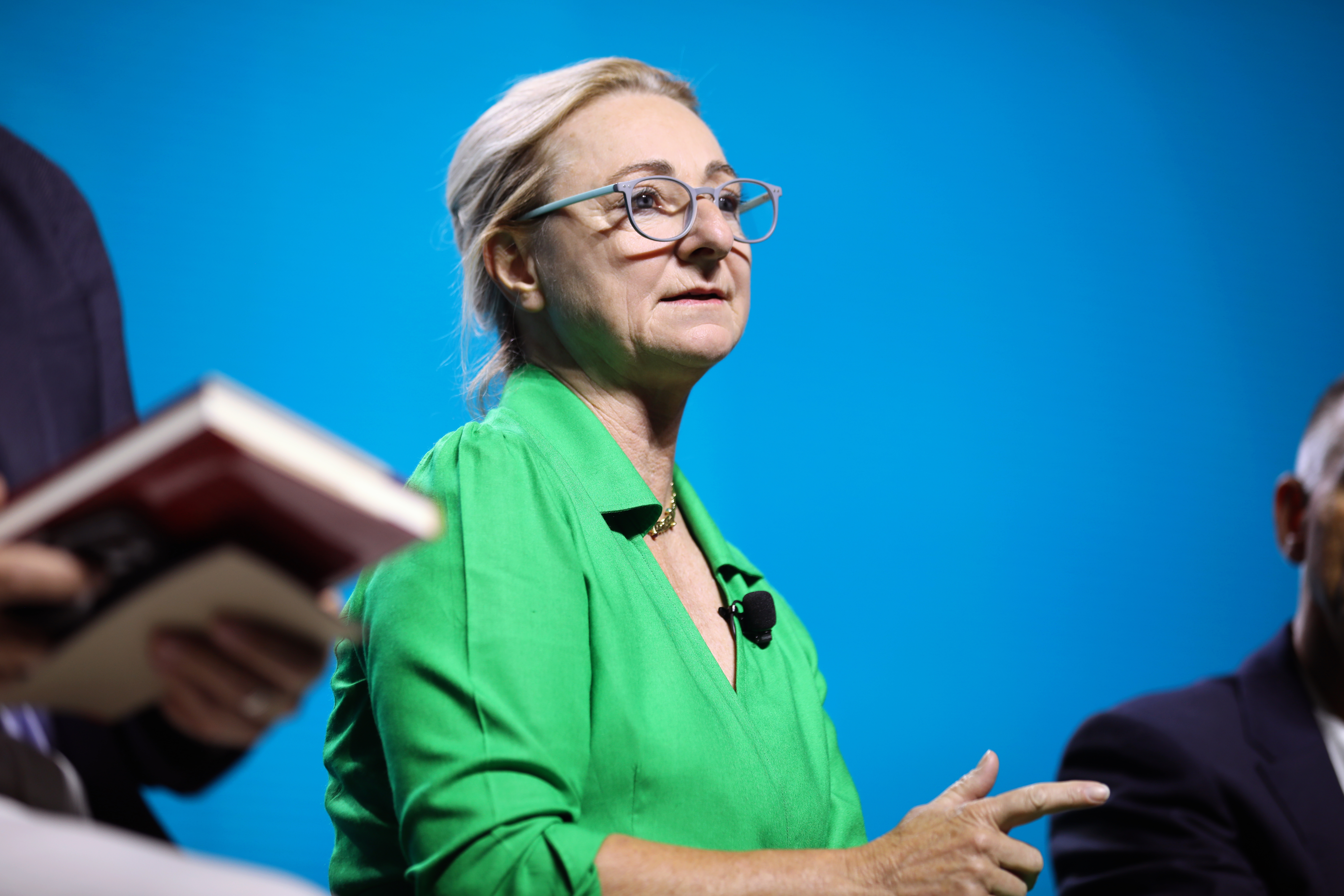
- Kolm in 2024

Member of the National Council
- Incumbent
- Assumed office 24 October 2024

Personal details
- Born: Barbara Lamprechter; 28 November 1964 (age 61)
- Party: Freedom Party

Barbara Kolm (née Lamprechter; born 28 November 1964) is an Austrian economist and politician of the Freedom Party. She was elected member of the National Council in the 2024 legislative election, and has served as director of the Friedrich A. v. Hayek Institut since 2000.
