= Entenmann's =

American baked goods manufacturer

- Type: Subsidiary
- Industry: Packaged foods
- Founded: 1898; 128 years ago in Brooklyn, New York City, New York, US
- Founder: William Entenmann
- Area served: US
- Products: Baked goods
- Owner: Grupo Bimbo
- Parent: Bimbo Bakeries USA
- Website: entenmanns.com

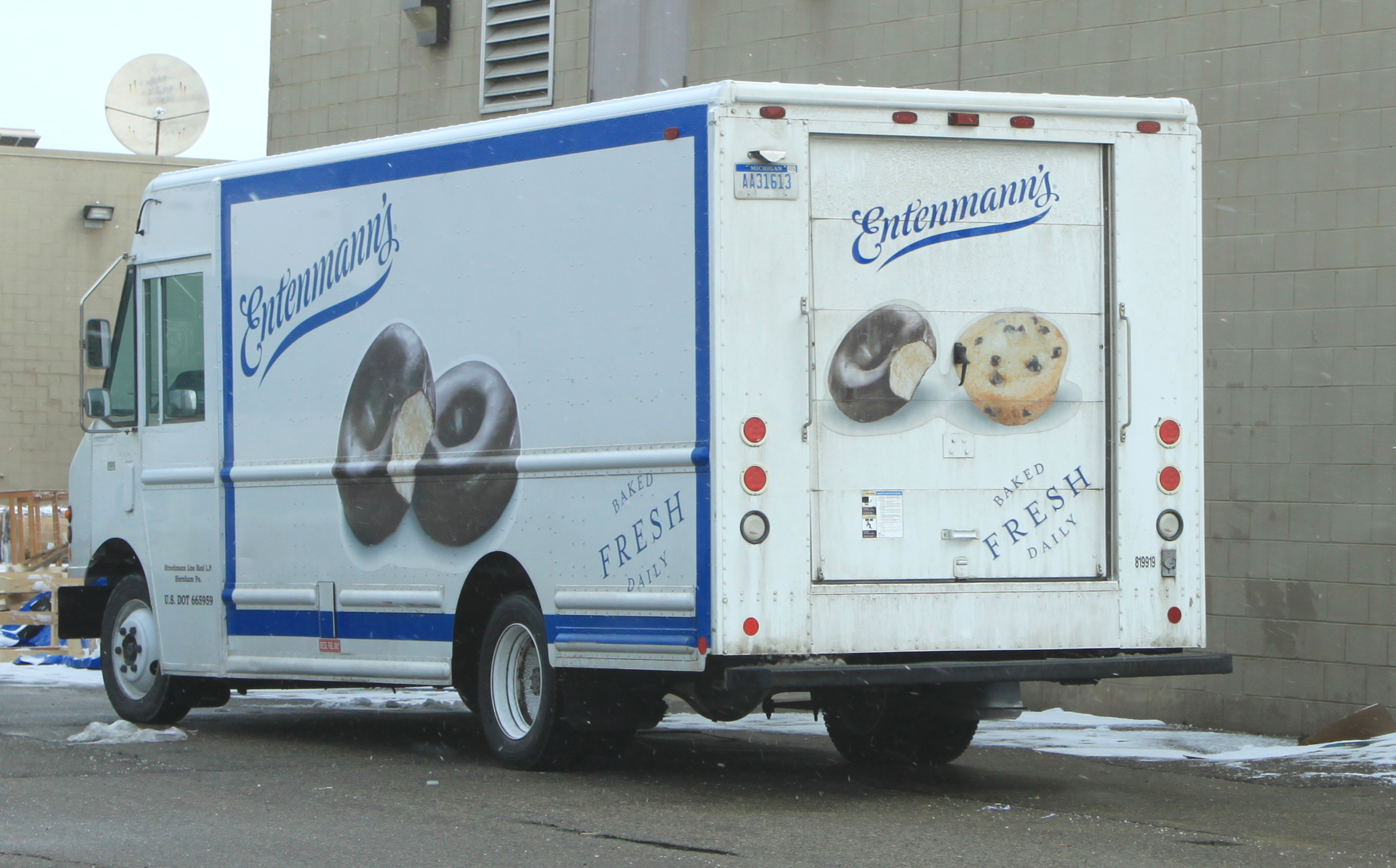
Entenmann's delivery truck in Ypsilanti, Michigan

Entenmann's is a formerly American-owned company, now owned by the Mexican conglomerate Grupo Bimbo, that manufactures baked goods and delivers them throughout the US to supermarkets and other retailers for public sales. Often, they are known to have display cases at the end of store aisles. More than 100 different items carry the Entenmann's brand, including dessert, cup, loaf, and crumb cakes; donuts, cookies, pies, cereal bars, muffins, pastries, and other baked goods including buns. The company has added coffee flavors and scented candles to their product line.

== History ==
Entenmann's is a 128-year-old company originating in New York City. William Entenmann learned the trade of baking from his father in Stuttgart, Germany, and used his acquired skills to work in a bakery in the US, eventually opening his own bakery in 1898 on Rogers Avenue in Brooklyn. Later, William moved his bakery to Bay Shore, Long Island. Home delivery was a substantial part of the bakery that William owned, eventually turning into 30 home delivery routes by the time his son, William Jr., took over the bakery. While William Jr. headed the bakery, it flourished; Frank Sinatra was a weekly customer.

William Jr. died in 1951, leaving the bakery to his wife Martha and their sons, Robert, Charles, and William. The family phased out bread to focus on pastries and cakes, and began supplying grocery stores rather than offering home delivery. In 1959, the Entenmann family invented the "see-through" cake box used by many bakeries today. In 1961, the business grew, with new bakeries and factories in Bay Shore, New Jersey, and Connecticut. Charles helped make the company nationally known. He excelled at administration and engineering, and he presided over the automation of the company’s cake lines. He oversaw the design of a computer-controlled system that delivered ingredients to the mixing vats.

Plans to expand nationally stalled in 1970. Entenmann's Bakery, with the assistance of new product consultants at Calle and Company, reformulated from heavier New England–style baked goods to lighter offerings more suitable for hotter, more humid test markets such as Miami and Atlanta. Entenmann's successful national expansion quickly followed. In 1972, Entenmann's started to sell chocolate chip cookies and has since sold more than 620 million cookies. Since its first opening in 1898, Entenmann's has been selling an "all-butter loaf cake" and has sold more than 700 million to date.

The pharmaceutical company Warner-Lambert purchased Entenmann's in 1978, and then sold it to General Foods in 1982. General Foods merged with Kraft in 1990. Kraft General Foods sold its bakery business to CPC International (later Bestfoods) in 1995. Bestfoods was purchased by Unilever in 2000, which sold its baking division to George Weston, a Canadian baked goods and supermarket business, the following year. Weston sold its US interests including Entenmann's, in 2008 to Mexican conglomerate Grupo Bimbo. Other Bimbo Bakeries USA holdings include Thomas', Brownberry, Boboli, Arnold, Oroweat, Freihofer’s, and Stroehmann.

On March 27, 2014, Entenmann's was reportedly ceasing baking operations at its Bay Shore, New York location. Other operations, such as sales, the store, and distribution, were to continue.

== Product line ==
Entenmann's Halloween cupcakes in the "see-through" box they invented

As of August 2010, Entenmann's products included donuts, loaf cakes, pies, Danish, cookies, Enten-minis—Brownies, and desserts that were packed in smaller servings, cereal bars, and 100 Calorie Little Bites.

In 2007, Entenmann's added a line of coffee products. Coffee Holding Company, Inc., made a three-year licensing agreement with Entenmann's Products, Inc., that gave Coffee Holding Company national rights to the sale and production of coffee that is branded Entenmann's. The agreement was terminated in 2011.

Entenmann's licensed their first non-edible product in September 2008 with the sale of scented candles. The candles were scented as coffee cake, all-butter loaf cake, and raspberry Danish. Other scents, such as pumpkin pie and warm gingerbread, were added for the holidays, and a chocolate chip cookie was made available in the spring of 2009.

In 2012, Entenmann's partnered with White Coffee Corporation for a new collection of flavored coffees and cocoa. The 100% arabica coffee is sold at Burlington Coat Factory, Dollar Tree, and Entenmann's Outlets, with expected sales in mass market, supermarkets, club stores, drug stores, and food service nationwide.

=== Products ===
- All Butter Loaf Cake
- Angel Food Loaf Cake
- Chocolate Chip Crumb Loaf Cake
- Marble Loaf Cake
- Banana Cake
- Black & White Cake
- Black & White Cookies
- Carrot Iced Cake
- Choc Chip Iced Cake
- Chocolate Fudge Cake
- Chocolate Truffle Iced Cake
- Corn Muffins
- Donuts
- Hot Cross Buns
- Lemon Coconut Cake
- Lemon Crunch Cake
- Lemon Loaf
- Little Bites Snacks
- Louisiana Crunch Cake
- Marshmallow Iced Devil's Food Cake
- New York Crumb Cake
- Raisin Loaf Cake
- Party Cake
- Rugelach
- Sour Cream Loaf Cake
- Sour Cream Oval
- Swiss Chocolate Chip Cake
- Thick Fudge Iced Golden Cake
- Milk Chocolate Chip Cookies
- Original Recipe Chocolate Chip Cookies
- Soft Baked Chocolate Chunk Cookies
- Pop 'Ems
- Raspberry Danish Twist
- Cheese Danish Twist
- Cheese Filled Crumb Coffee Cake
- Dark Chocolate Cake with Dark Chocolate frosting
- Chocolate Eclairs

=== Discontinued products ===
- Apple Strudel
- Almond Danish Ring
- Banana Crunch Cake
- Blackout Cake
- Blueberry Crumb Pie
- Brownie Crumb Ring
- Butter Coffee Cake
- Cheese Filled Crumb Coffee Cake
- Chocolate Flake Square [and a similar Chocolate Flake Ring]
- Coconut Custard Pie
- Dulce de Leche Cake
- Filled Chocolate Chip Crumb Cake
- Fruitcake (Seasonal)
- Fudge Nut Brownie Cookies
- New York Cheesecake
- Chewy Snack Barz
- Soft fudge iced cupcakes
- Swiss Chocolate Chip Cake
- Brownie Ring (bundt cake with mocha frosting)
- Pineapple Cheese Strudel
- Golden Walnut Cake Holiday Specialty
- Danish Ring Cake
- Vanilla and Chocolate Cup Cakes
- Vanilla-filled Crumb Cake
- Metropolitan Cake
- Walnut Coffee Cake
- Marble Iced Fudge Cake
- Milk Chocolate Donuts
- Rum Cake

== See also ==
- List of bakeries
- List of brand name breads
