= Daniel Servitje =

Mexican businessman

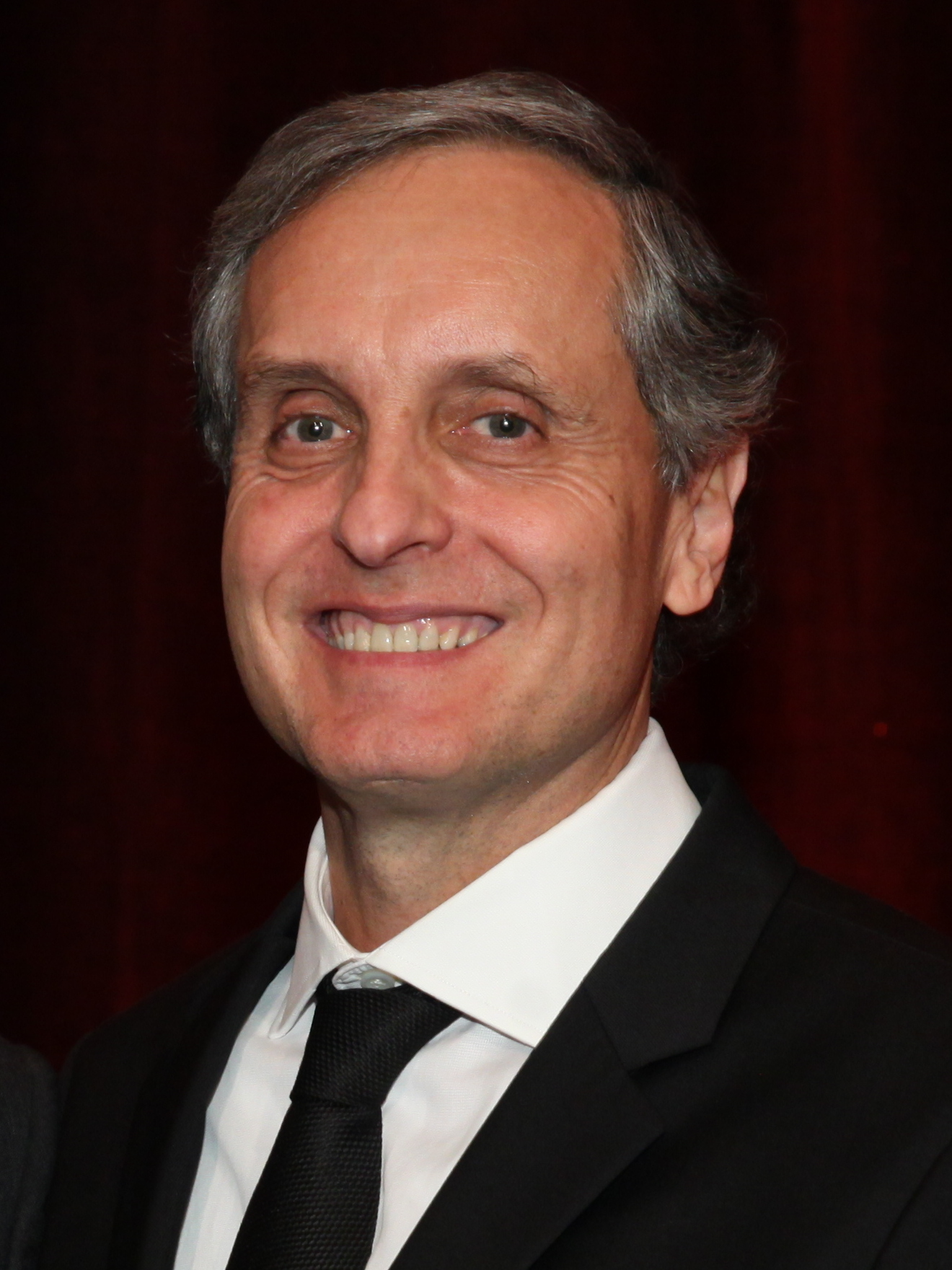
- Servitje in 2018
- Born: Daniel Javier Servitje Montull; 1 April 1959 (age 67); Mexico City, Mexico
- Education: Universidad Iberoamericana; Stanford University
- Occupation: Businessman
- Title: CEO, Grupo Bimbo
- Term: May 2007-
- Parent(s): Carmen Montull; Lorenzo Servitje

Daniel Javier Servitje Montull (born in Mexico City; April 1, 1959) is a Mexican businessman, and the president and CEO of Grupo Bimbo, the world's largest bakery company, which his father, Lorenzo Servitje, cofounded in 1945.

== Early life ==
Daniel Javier Servitje Montull was born on April 1, 1959 in Mexico City, to Carmen Montull and Lorenzo Servitje, a businessman. and the youngest of eight children.

Servitje earned a bachelor's degree from Universidad Iberoamericana, and an MBA from Stanford University in Palo Alto, California, United States.

== Career ==
Servitje has been CEO of Grupo Bimbo since May 2007, and president and CEO since July 2013.

Servitje is a board member of ITAM Business School, Grocery Manufacturers of America, and the Instituto Mexicano para la Competitividad.

== Personal life ==
Servitje currently lives in Mexico City.
