= Oktoberfest (disambiguation) =

Oktoberfest may refer to:

- Oktoberfest
- Oktoberfest celebrations
- Oktoberfest – La Crosse, Wisconsin
- Oktoberfest Zinzinnati
- Oktoberfest of Blumenau
- Kitchener–Waterloo Oktoberfest
- Oktoberfest tents
- Oktoberfest terror attack

== Films ==
- Oktoberfest (1987 film), a Yugoslav 1987 drama directed by Dragan Kresoja about a young man and his unemployed friends' experiences from the Munich beer festival
- Oktoberfest (2005 film), a German crime film from 2005 directed by Johannes Brunner about Munich's Oktoberfest
