= Riverside Park (La Crosse) =

Public park in La Crosse, Wisconsin

Coordinates: 43°48′54″N 91°15′20″W

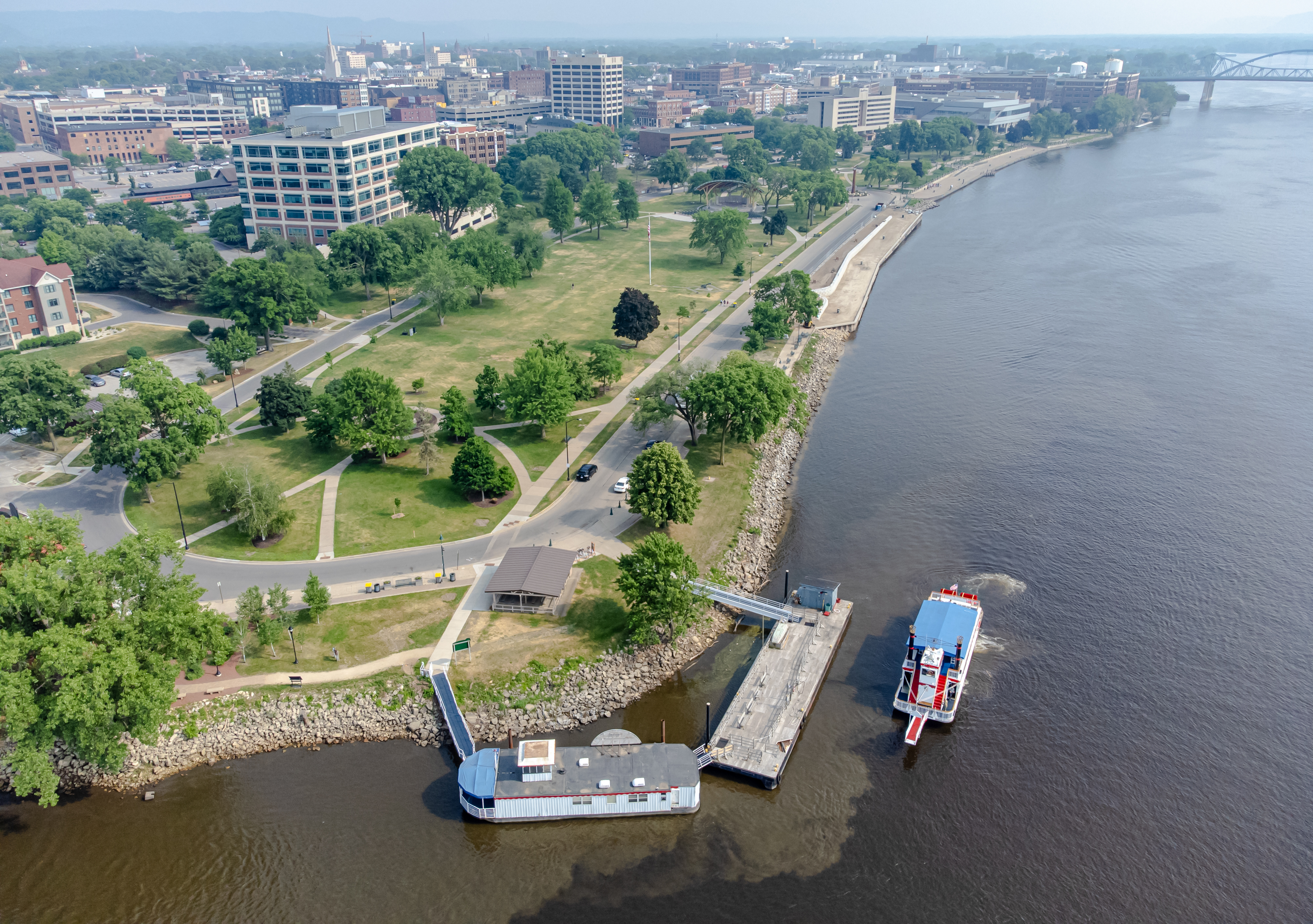
- View of the Mississippi River from the park.
- Interactive map of Riverside Park
- Location: La Crosse, Wisconsin, United States
- Designer: John Nolen
- Administrator: City of La Crosse Parks, Recreation, and Forestry
- Public transit: MTU: C2

Riverside Park is a public park located on the riverfront of downtown La Crosse, Wisconsin. It hosts events such as Riverfest, Fourth of July fireworks, Oktoberfest, Moon Tunes, and the Rotary Lights. The steamboats American Queen, La Crosse Queen, and Julia Belle Swain make stops along the river in the park. The park has walking/running trails.

== History ==
The region's weather service has maintained a gauge for reading the water of the Mississippi river at Riverside Park for over 145 years. Its first iteration was installed near a flour mill on the former Mount Vernon Street. The U.S. Army Signal Corps recorded their first reading at this location on June 17, 1873. At the time, it was necessary for workers from the US Weather Bureau to visit and read the staff gauge daily. A permanent shelter for this equipment was built in the 1930s along with a styrofoam float device for more easily measuring the water level. In 1942, a transmitter was added to the shelter which meant that observers no longer had to visit the gauge in person to record readings. This shelter remains at the same location on the southern end of the park to this day and is used by both the National Weather Service and the United States Army Corps of Engineers to obtain readings of the water level of the Mississippi in La Crosse.

When it was first created in the late 19th century, the park was named Spence Park after Thomas H. Spence, who had given the land to the city. The waterfront west of Spence Park had been used by a ferry, but when it closed in 1891, that area became part of the park as well after it was expanded and filled using sediment collected from dredging the main channel. In 1908 Mayor Wendell Anderson invited landscape architect John Nolen to design the city's emerging parks system. Nolen's resulting 1911 plan was extensive, though it only drew up an explicit design for what he called “Levee Park.” Construction of the park was carried out according to his plan in 1912. Since then, the park has evolved in a way that no longer strictly resembles Nolen's original design, though the general shape and placement of major features within the park remains truthful to it.

The Riverside International Friendship Gardens are located at the northern end of the park. Officially, the gardens are independent of the park and constitute their own 1.2 acre site. It is maintained by the City of La Crosse Parks Department, the Bluff Country Master Gardeners, and the Riverside International Friendship Gardens Board of Directors. The gardens are divided into regions which represent the ecology of La Crosse's sister-cities in China, Germany, France, Russia, Norway and Ireland.

Several renovations and improvements to the park have been made to the park in recent years, including expansion of the adjoining friendship gardens, restoration of the park's fountain, and renovation of its bandshell. In 2020, a 350-foot dock was installed on the south end of the park, giving access to the downtown area to local boaters.

== Structures ==
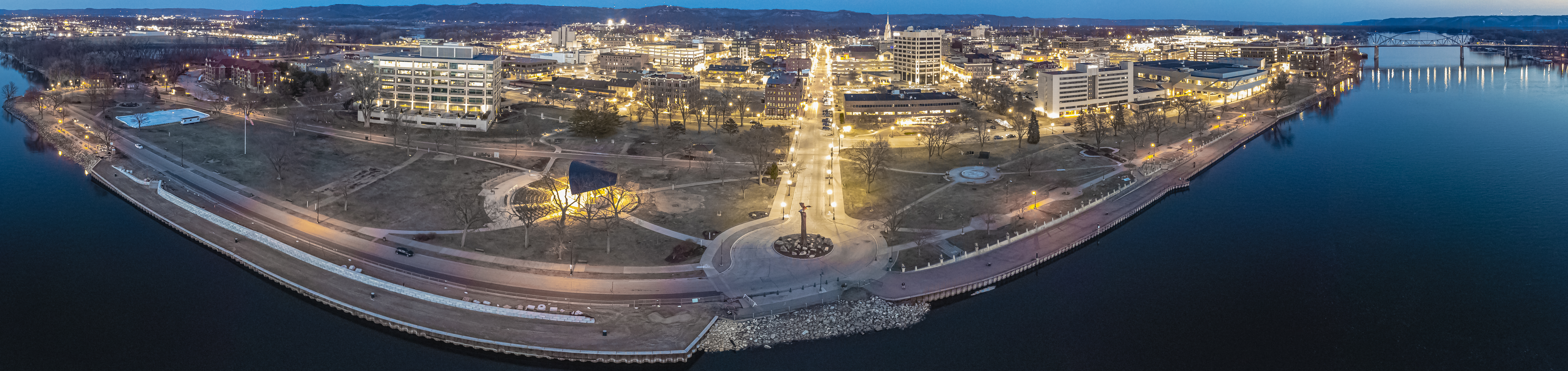
La Crosse aerial panoramic at night

=== Buildings ===
The La Crosse Convention and Visitors Bureau building is located at the north end of the park. It was originally built in 1924 as a fish control lab. The building was home to the Riverside Museum from 1990 until it moved in February 2020. The building and northern area of the park are slated to be redeveloped in the near future.

The bandshell was originally designed by Otto A. Merman. Its construction was funded by private donations and it was erected by Theodore Molzahn. The cornerstone was ceremonially laid on June 1, 1930. It was completed later that same year and the structure was dedicated on September 14, 1930. The bandshell was dedicated in memory of Wendell B. Anderson, a former mayor of the city who had founded its park system. The original cement construction was built in 1930s art deco inspired style. The structure had been renovated in 1962 and 1978 and was first expanded in 1986, when wings of concrete were added on either side of the stage. A renovation which began in 2019 largely overhauled the structure. A design by the architect Roald Gundersen reconstructed the stage and seating area. Most notably, it added a monumental wooden canopy which was built using trees harvested from the area and designed to reference the city's historical logging industry.

At the northern tip of the park, there is a dock and ticket booth for the La Crosse Queen, a paddleboat which offers tours of the river. The boat is a replica of the steam powered river boats that travelled along the Mississippi in the early 1900s. According to one member of the La Crosse County Historical Society, the park itself was built on top of three of such steamboats and a barge which were covered up with sediment dredged out of the main channel.

=== Monuments ===
The park is home to several sculptures, the most monumental of which is a large steel eagle on top of a tree trunk. This statue was created by Elmer Petersen and erected in 1986 at the entrance of the park. Until 2020, the park was also home to a Statue of Hiawatha, which stood at the park's northern end. It was removed after decades of controversy over whether the statue was culturally insensitive and offensive.

A cannon, cast in Seville, Spain in 1787, is located near the park's bandshell. It stood in Havana Harbor for over 100 years before being captured by US troops during the Cuban War of Independence. All of the cannons in the harbor were confiscated by the United States government as war prizes to be distributed around the country. After lobbying from congressman John J. Esch, two of these cannons were designated for the State of Wisconsin, one of which was to be placed in his constituency of La Crosse. In 1900, it was placed outside the City Hall, which was then on 3rd and State Street. The 4,375-pound cannon was moved to its current location in the park in 1918. The plaque next to it reads: “In memorial U.S.S. Maine. Destroyed in Havana Harbor, February 1898.” The plaque itself was made from metal recovered from the USS Maine. During WWII, petitions were made by the community to recycle the cannon and use the metal for war supplies. The type of metal that it is made of, however, would not have been particularly useful and the cannon remained.

The park's original fountain was donated to the city by Jake Hoeschler in 1981. In 2003, the family funded the installation of a new fountain in its place. The new fountain, designed by Kurt Schroeder, represented the seven rivers which converge in the region. Its three largest geysers represent the Mississippi, La Crosse, and Black Rivers, while the four smaller geysers correspond to smaller rivers in the region. The fountain was turned off in 2016 due to weather-related deterioration. Repairs were carried out in 2019, and completed that summer.

== Events ==
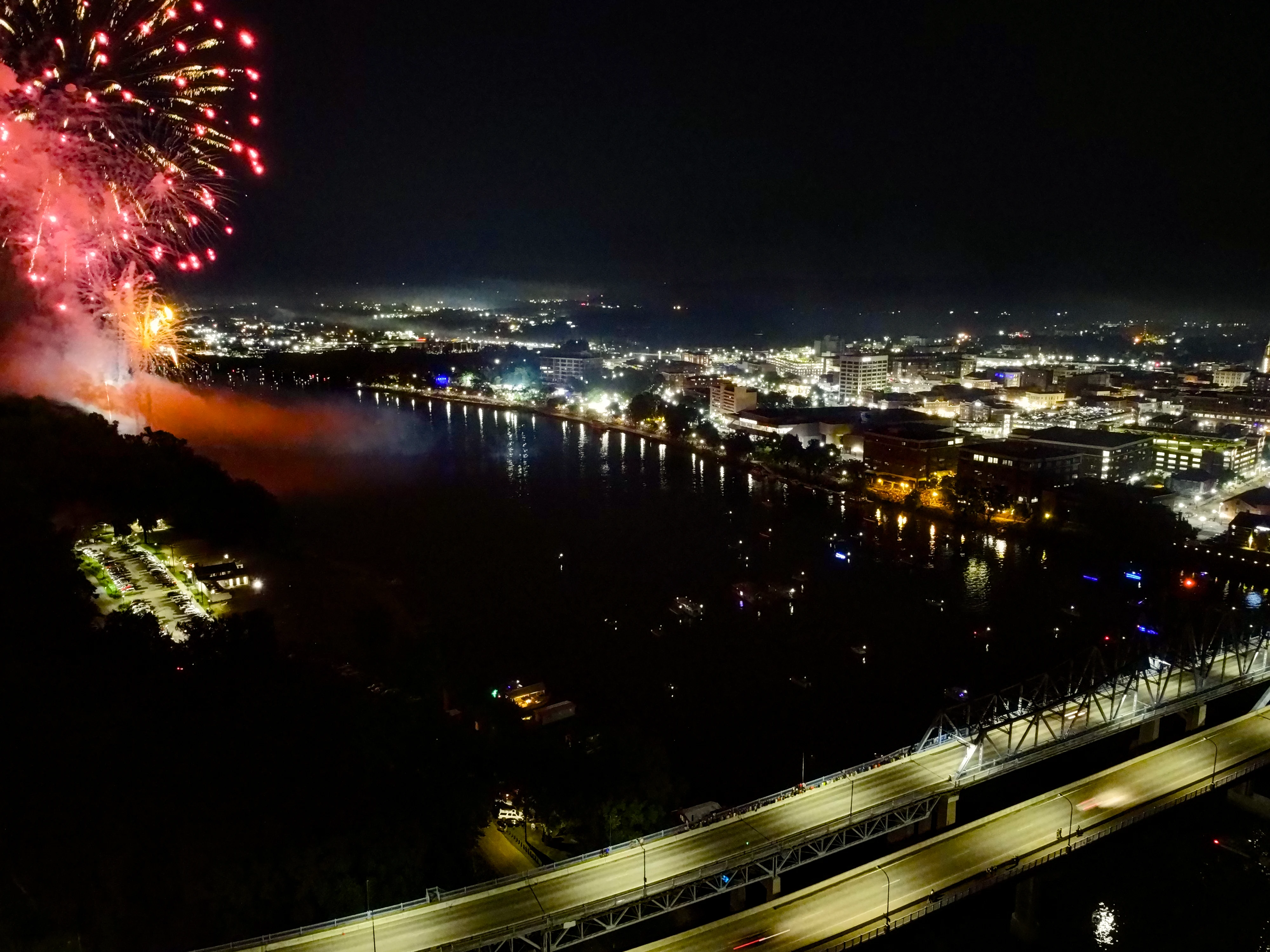
La Crosse fireworks

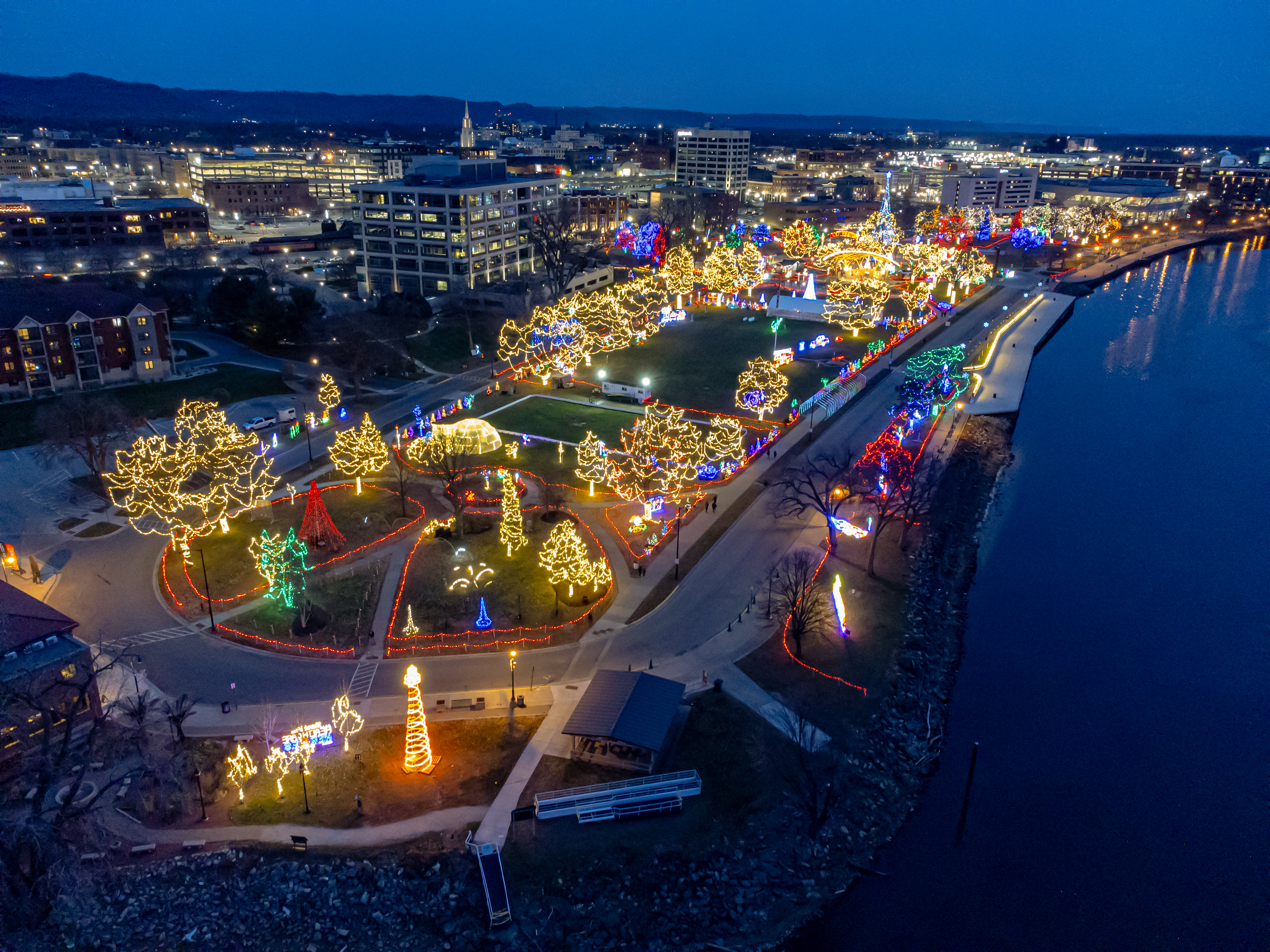
Rotary Lights christmas lights

The park regularly hosts a variety of events throughout the year, most notably Riverfest, the Great River Folk Festival, Oktoberfest, Moon Tunes, and the Rotary Lights.

The park's annual 4 July celebration, called Riverfest, was established in 1983. The festival was created in the hope of encouraging residents to remain in the city for the holiday, rather than traveling to other celebrations.

The park hosts the Rotary Lights, an annual lights display, from the day after Thanksgiving until New Year's Eve. The event started in 1995 and is organized by local Rotary Clubs in support of the region's charities. Today, over 3,000,000 LED lights decorate the park and nearly 160,000 visitors tour the display annually.

== Gallery ==
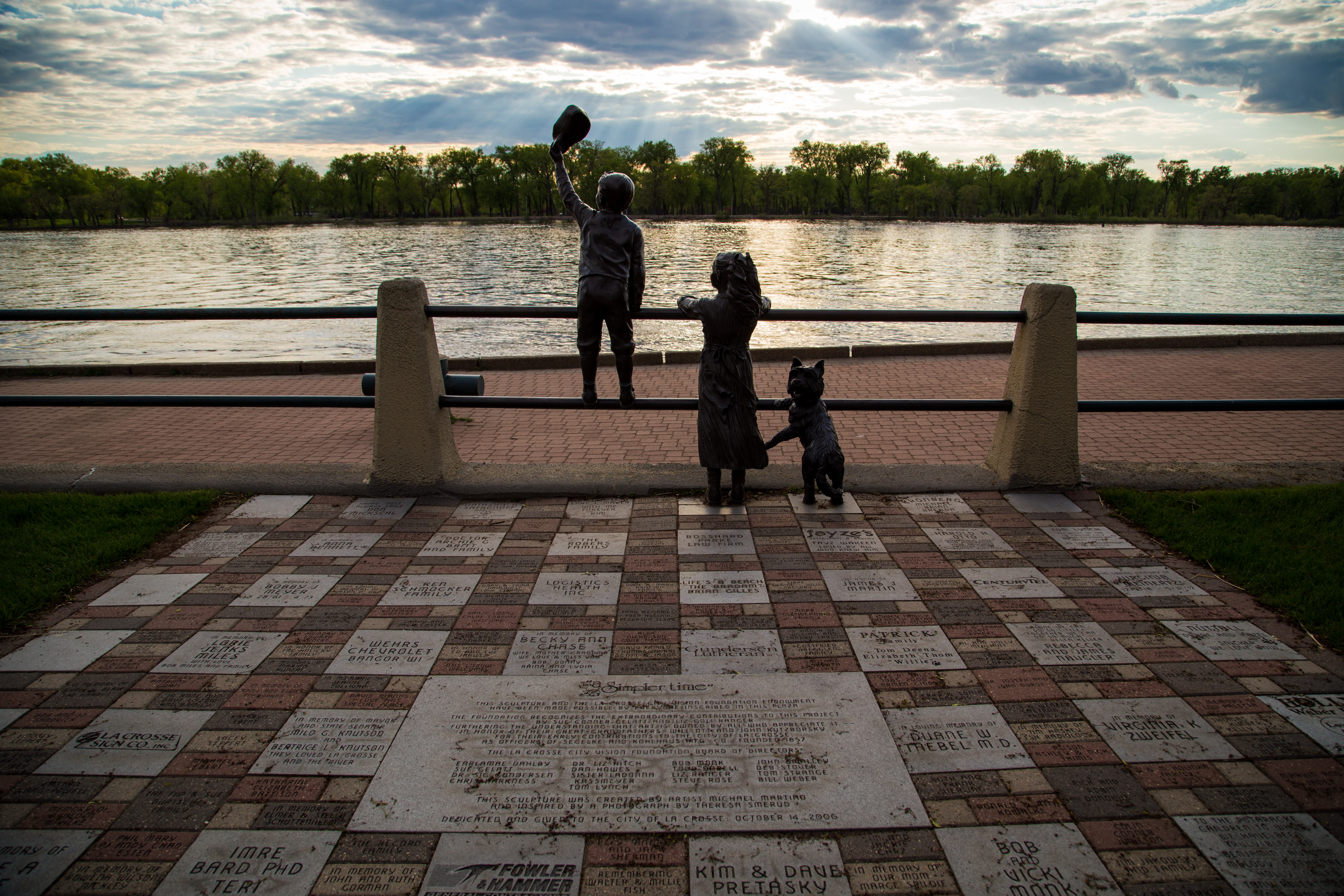
A Simpler Time Statue in Riverside Park at sunset.

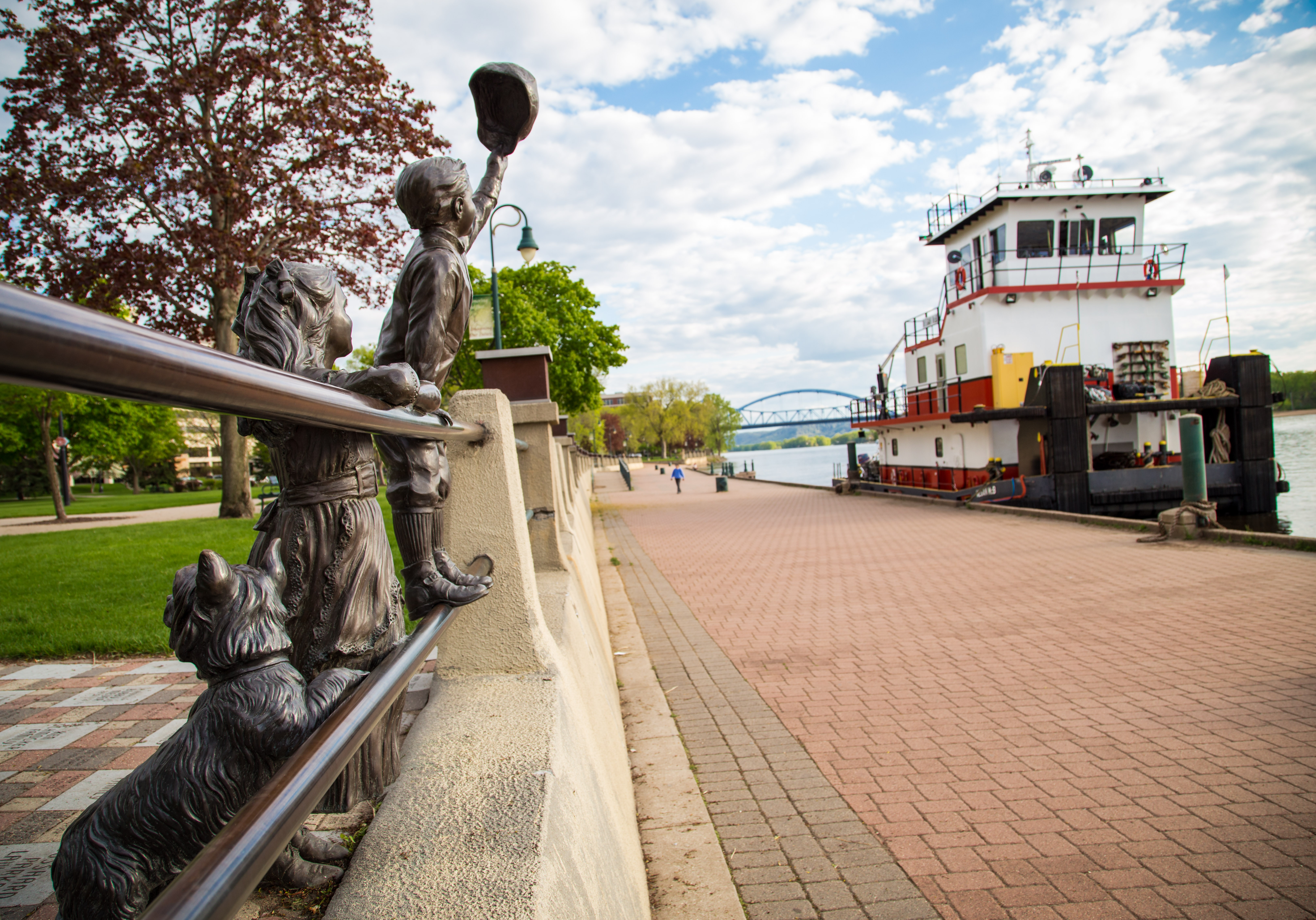
A Simpler Time Statue and Riverside Park levee.

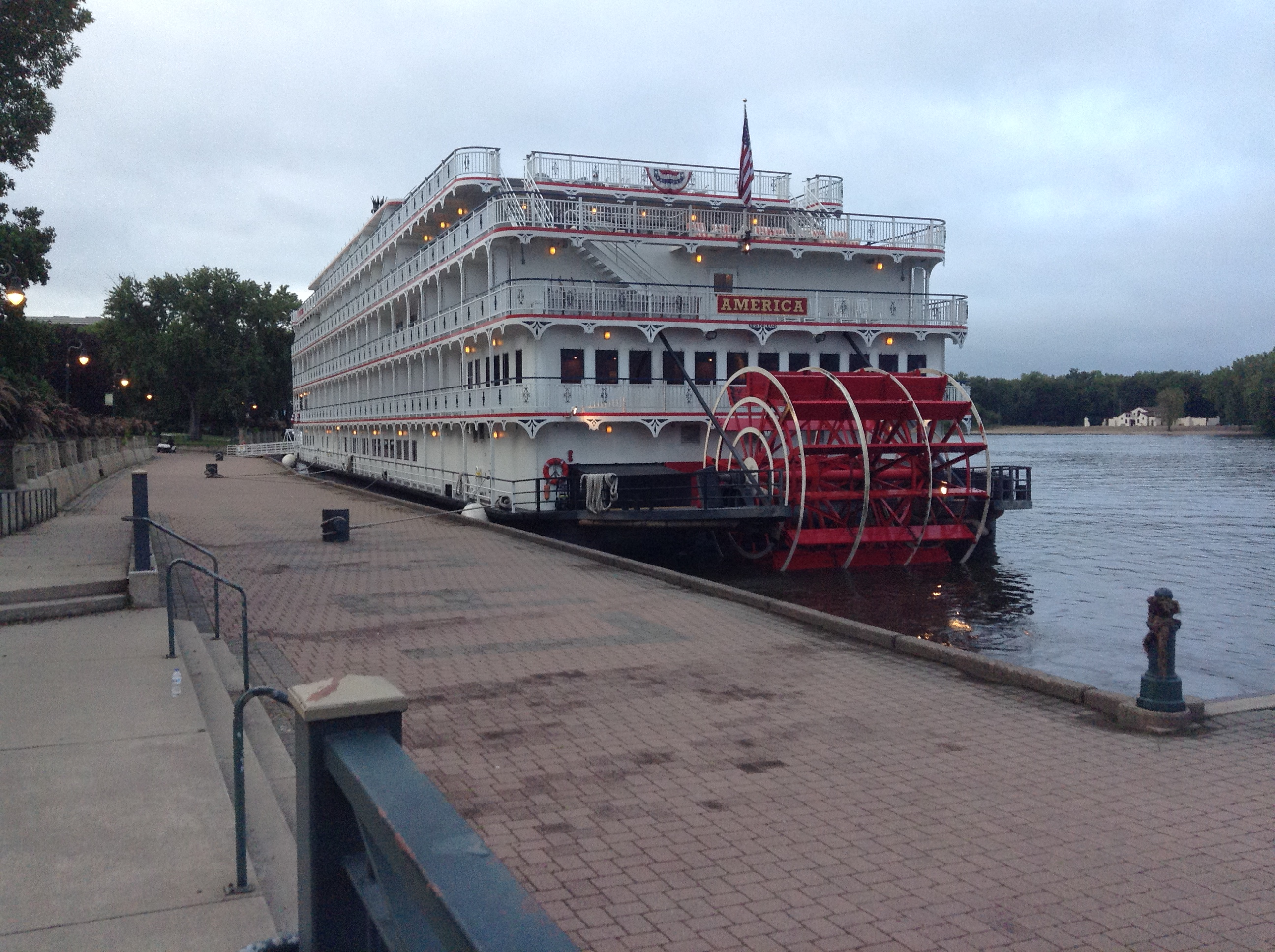
America at Riverside Park.

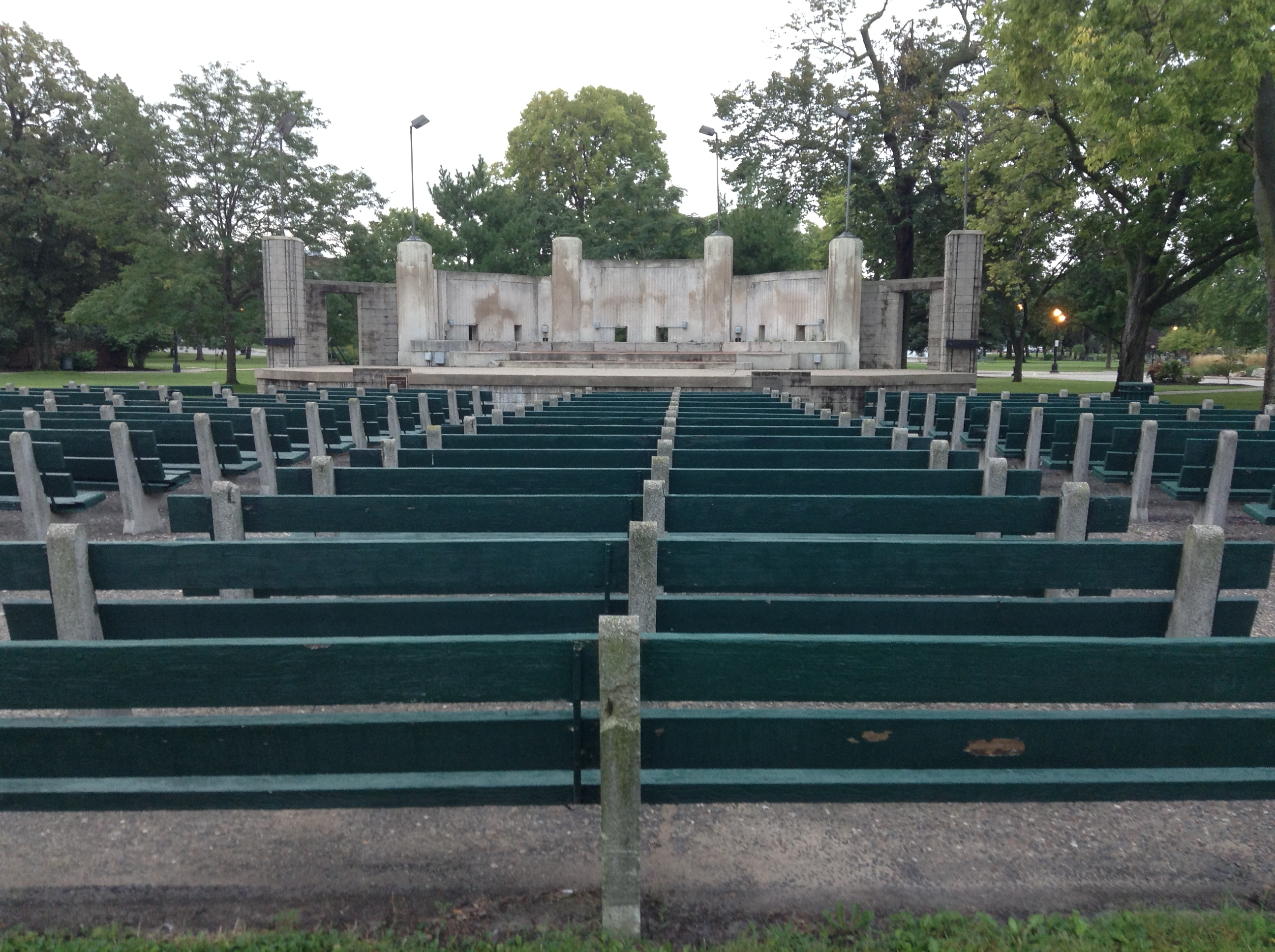
Riverside Park La Crosse band shell prior to the 2019 renovations.

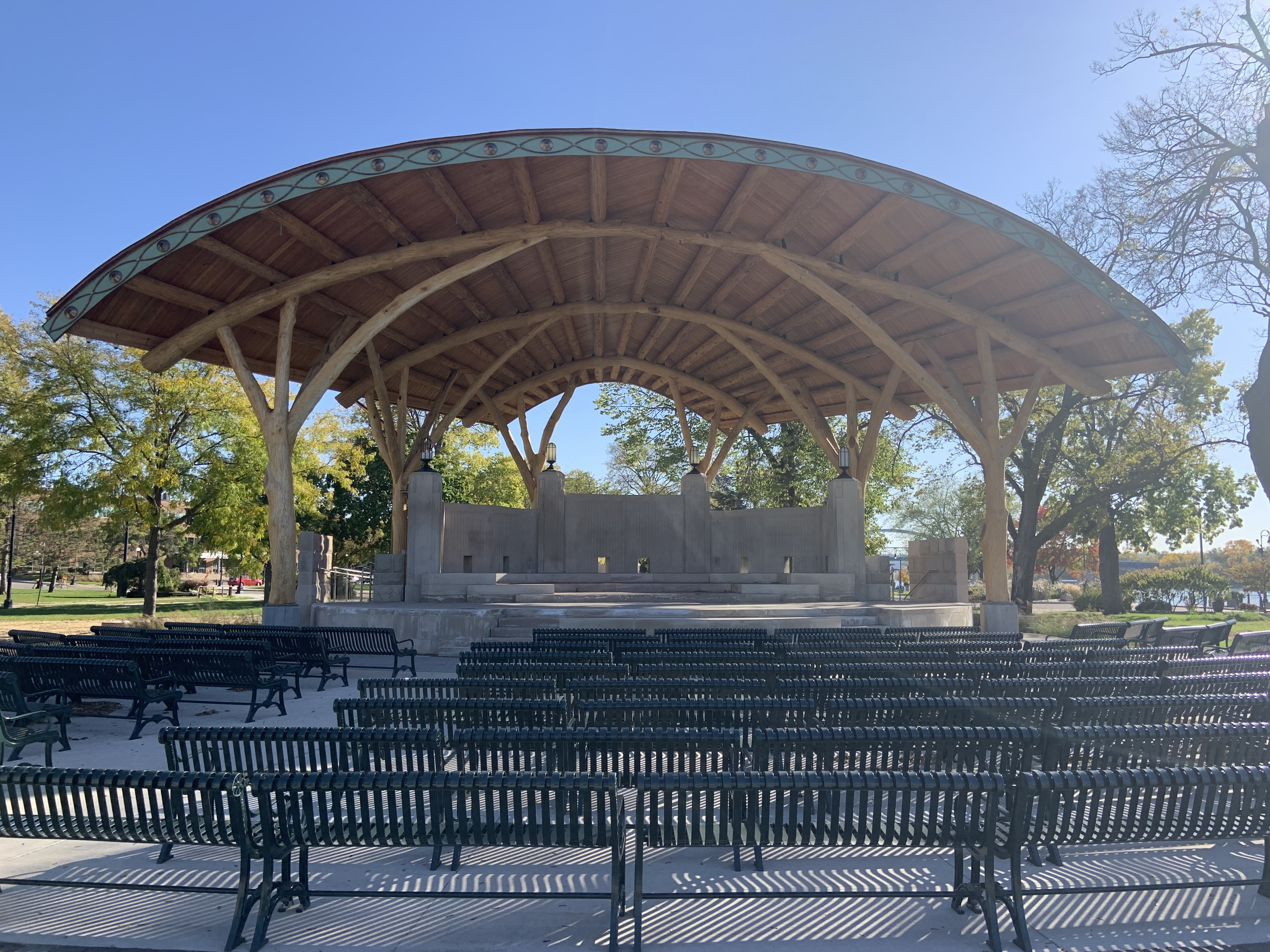
New Riverside Park bandshell

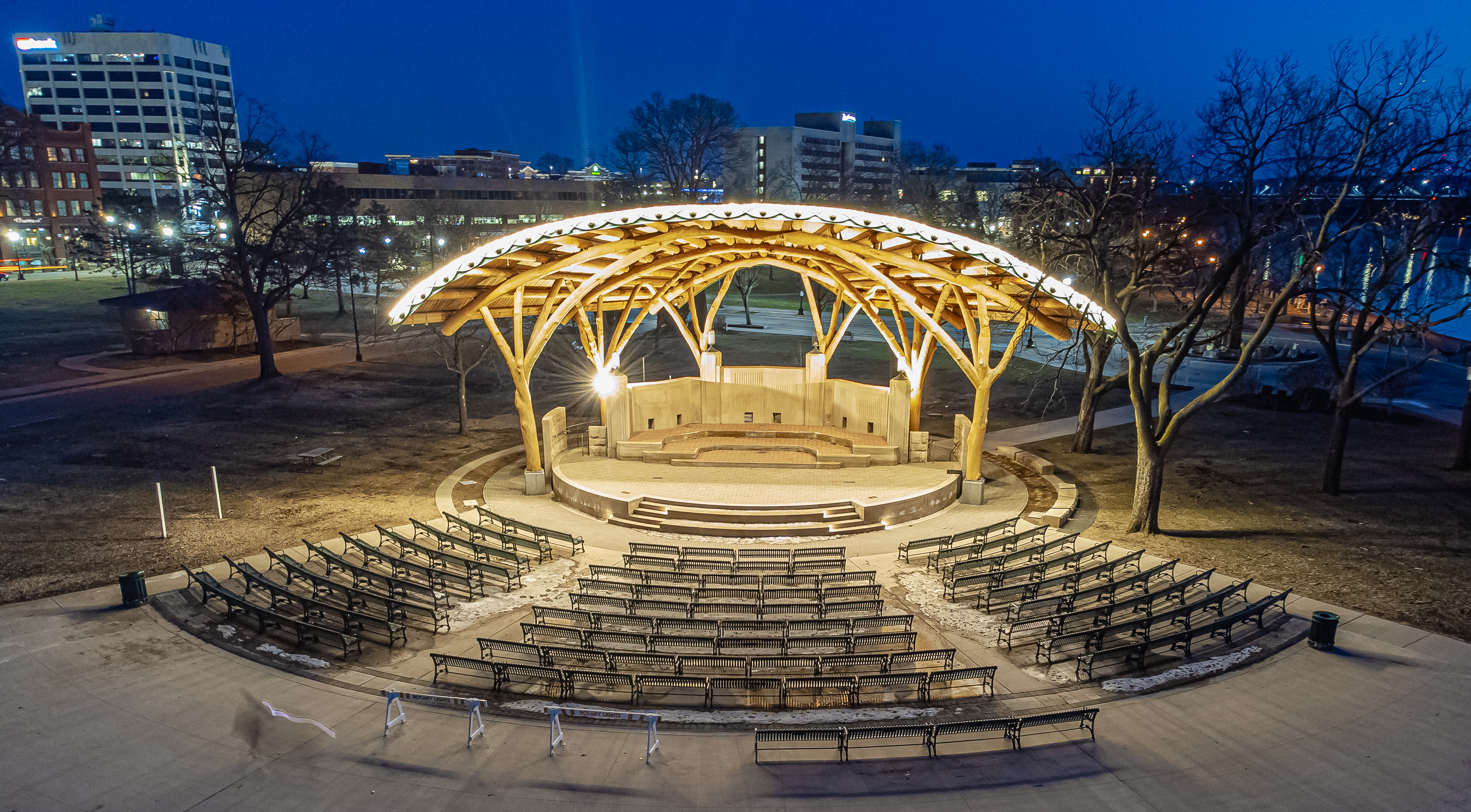
Riverside Park band shell at night

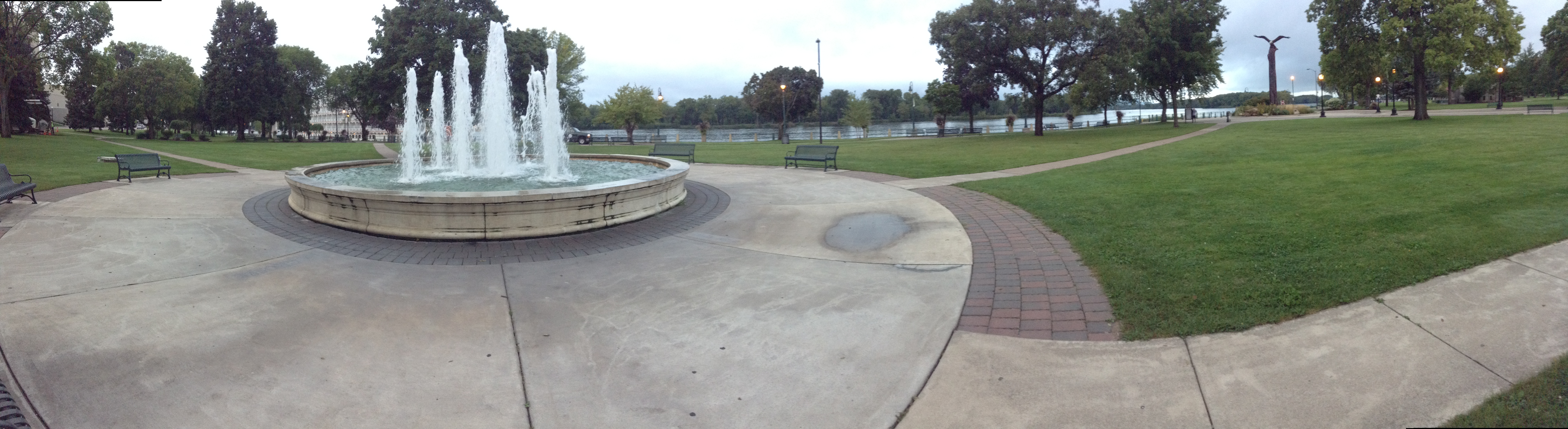
Riverside Park fountain.

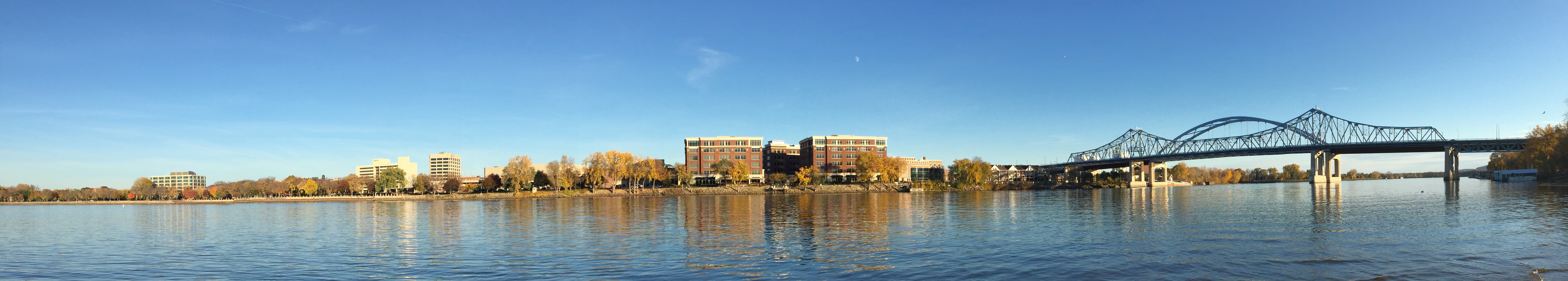
La Crosse Riverside Park waterfront as seen from Pettibone Park.

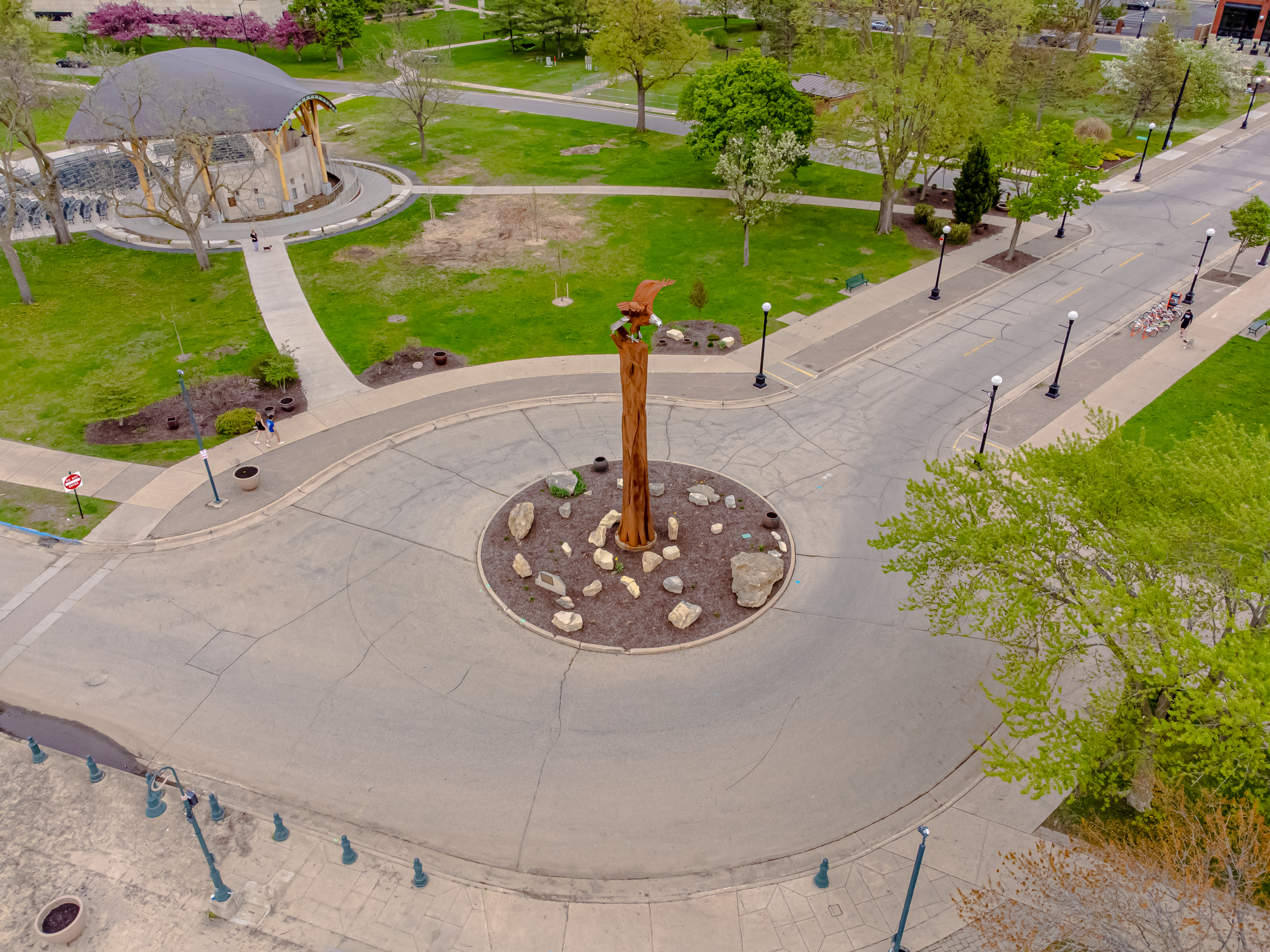
La Crosse River Side Park Eagle

== See also ==
- Copeland Park (La Crosse)
- Pettibone Park (La Crosse)
- The Freight House
- La Crosse Center
