= Statue of Hiawatha =

Statue of Hiawather, formerly installed in La Crosse, Wisconsin, U.S.

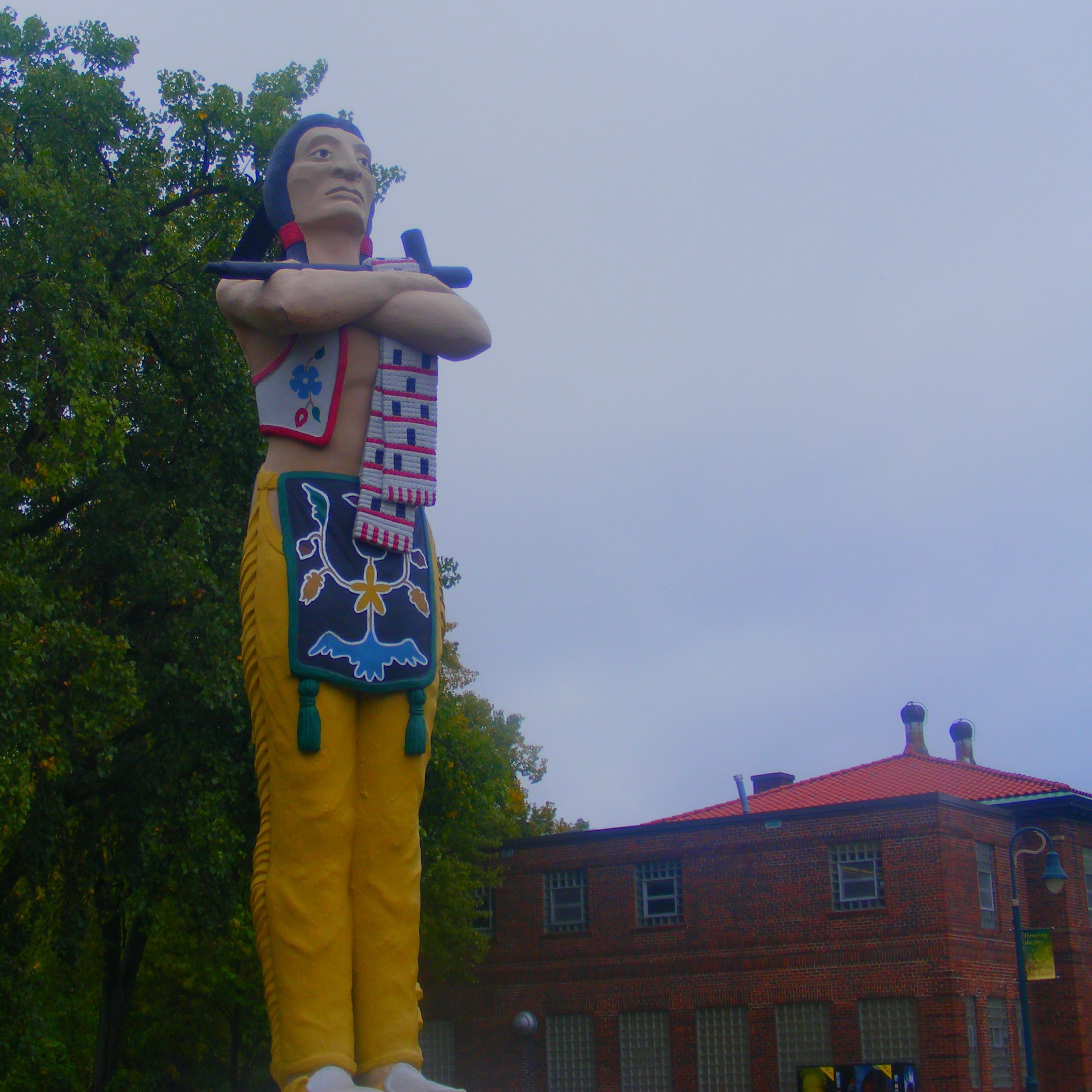
- The statue in 2008
- Artist: Anthony Zimmerhakl
- Year: 1962
- Completion date: 1961
- Medium: Concrete
- Subject: Hiawatha
- Weight: 20 tons
- Condition: removed
- Location: La Crosse, Wisconsin, U.S.; 43°49′5.5″N 91°15′22.5″W

The Statue of Hiawatha was a monument located at Riverside Park in La Crosse, Wisconsin. The statue was created by Anthony Zimmerhakl and overlooked the convergence of three rivers at Riverside Park: the Mississippi River, Black River, and the La Crosse River.

It had been built with the intention of drawing tourism to the area and was based on a fictionalized version of Hiawatha, a 16th-century Native American chief who had no connection to local tribes. Long standing public debate about whether the statue was offensive or presented a caricature based on stereotypes of Native Americans eventually led to its removal in 2020, nearly 60 years after it was erected.

== History ==
=== Installation ===
In 1958, the city of La Crosse’s Chamber of Commerce commissioned art teacher Anthony Zimmerhakl to create a statue to be placed in Riverside Park. The Chamber of Commerce hoped that a monumental statue would draw tourism to the area. Zimmerhakl reportedly constructed the resulting 25-foot, 20-ton statue in his backyard near Weigent Park with the assistance of his sons.

The city’s Board of Park Commissioners initially rejected the statue’s placement in Riverside Park in 1958. The board was not in opposition to the statue itself, but felt that it would “conflict with the essentially formal theme” of the park. They suggested that it instead be placed in Houska Park, though the city’s Tourist Publicity Committee largely ignored their proposal in favor of a more visible location for their tourist attraction. A 1994 thesis on revitalisation efforts of Riverside Park said the statue “detracts highly from the overall character of the park, developing an almost carnival-like feel to the area.”

The statue was the subject of controversy even before it was formally erected. A committee meeting in September 1961 debated over naming the statue Hiawatha. Of concern to those at the meeting was that Hiawatha had no ties to local Ho-Chunk and First Nation people; he was a member of the Mohawk people, historically based in the Mohawk River Valley in the state of New York. Proposals were made by city representatives and members of the local historical society to name the statue after a local indigenous leader, such as Waukon Decorah, Winnebago, Winneshiek, or Blackhawk. Unfortunately, the statue did not resemble local tribes in any way. The name was ultimately chosen because of its recognizability within western culture in the hopes of drawing the largest number of tourists.

Amid this naming controversy, the statue was erected in 1962. A plaque originally placed adjacent to the statue read:

This Indian is symbolic of all the Indians of the area and is dedicated particularly to the braves of the Winnebagoes [sic]. Among the most famous were Chief Decorah and his son, Chief Winneshiek. La Crosse started as a trading post in Indian territory. Trail and river led to the prairie, a favorite gathering place for the Indians. The French named it Prairie La Crosse for a game they saw the Indians playing which reminded them of their own game of La Crosse [sic].

=== Controversy and removal ===
Members of the Ho-Chunk nation had opposed the statue’s installation from the beginning, and had actively advocated for its removal since the early 2000s. The statue had been loosely modeled on the traditional dress of the Mohawk people, though its appearance was a conglomeration of traditional wardrobe from many tribes. Because of this, it did not reflect the traditions of the Ho-Chunk Nation, and local association of the statue to their culture was denigrative. In effect, the statue was a caricature and generalized image of a Native American, which had been solely intended as a tourist attraction. Of the statue, Tracy Littlejohn stated that “It is not an honor to us. It does not teach anything. People don’t learn about the Ho-Chunk people because they see a statue. It was a tourist attraction not meant to teach anything.”

By 2000, the statue was in need of repairs as its plaster had begun to erode and several cracks had formed which exposed its interior steel frame. A report compiled following an inspection of the structure found it to be dangerous, and recommended that if major repairs were not carried out, a fence should be placed around it to prevent pieces of plaster from falling on passersby. An estimated repair cost of $50,000 sparked debate within the community over the statue’s worth and continued maintenance by the city. This debate resulted in public outcry both by those who found the statue historically important and those who found it disrespectful. A special “Hiawatha Statue Committee” was formed to address the controversy. This committee ultimately voted in favor of keeping the statue of Hiawatha, and funds were allocated to refurbish it.

On July 13, 2020, the city’s Mayor, Tim Kabat formally requested that the statue be removed by the Board of Park Commissioners. The city had been coordinating with the artist’s family to remove the statue for several years, who had requested that the statue be returned to them and relocated out of the city. Alongside these talks, the Mayor’s decision was catalyzed by the removal of monuments during the George Floyd Protests. His letter recommended that the statue be immediately removed from the park and relocated to the city’s Municipal Service Center until the family of the artist identified a privately owned location for the statue. He also proposed that the site be later renovated to honor Ho Chunk and First Nation people in a more respectful manner. The board unanimously agreed with the mayor's proposal. The statue was then removed on August 10, 2020 and placed in storage.

== See also ==
- List of monuments and memorials removed during the George Floyd protests

== Notes ==
1.This plaque was not historically accurate, as the game of lacrosse had not originated with the French. Additionally, the region’s Ho-Chunk Nation has erroneously been referred to as the Winnebago in the past, though they have always referred to themselves as Ho-Chunk.
