= Pettibone Park (La Crosse) =

Park in La Crosse, Wisconsin, United States

Coordinates: 43.817°N 91.262°W

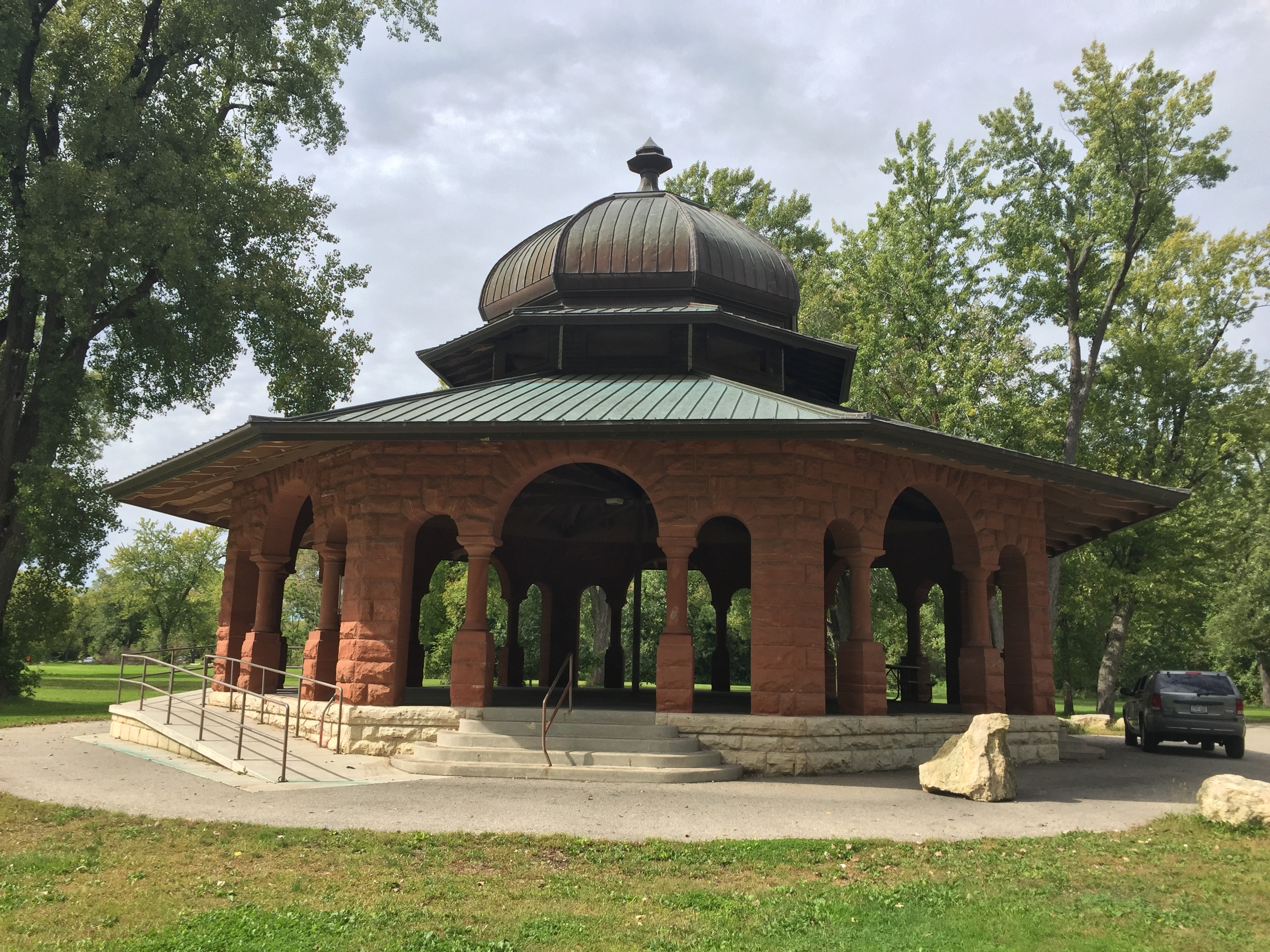
- Pavilion at Pettibone Park
- Interactive map of Pettibone Park
- Location: La Crosse, Wisconsin
- Created: 1901
- Founder: Albert W. Pettibone
- Operator: La Crosse Department of Parks, Recreation, & Forestry
- Public transit: MTU: 10

Pettibone Park is a public park on Barron Island in La Crosse, Wisconsin. The park is located across the Mississippi River from the city's downtown riverfront. Its facilities include walking trails, fishing docks, a beach, and a disc golf course.

The park is named after Albert Wells Pettibone (1827–1915), a former mayor of the city of La Crosse who privately funded the creation of the park. Pettibone died before the park could formally be gifted to the city as he intended, because of a border dispute between the states of Wisconsin and Minnesota which was not fully resolved until 1919.

== History ==
Nathan Myrick famously first settled on Barron Island in 1841. His trading post there led to the establishment of a settlement in La Crosse.

Alonzo and Lucretia Barron, after whom the island is named, at one time owned Barron Island. They had intended to develop it, though the couple never built their "Island City." Because of unpaid taxes, the land was seized by Houston County, of which the island was a part at that point. The land was purchased by Albert Pettibone in 1901 for $62,000 from D.J. Cameron. Pettibone had been mayor of La Crosse for three terms and made his fortune through the city's lumber trade. He and his wife, Cordelia, intended to construct a park there for public use.

At the time, the island was essentially a swamp, and only one person lived on it. A local newspaper referred to the island as "a low, marshy, unsightly tract of land covered with vines and underbrush and whose only redeeming feature was its location and wealth of beautiful trees." Several major projects were necessary to turn the island into usable land, including the dredging of lakes. In addition, an area for a campground was cleared and a pavilion and bathhouse were erected.

Upon the park's completion, Pettibone wished to gift the park to the city of La Crosse. The island, however, fell within Minnesota's borders and could not legally be owned by a city in Wisconsin. In an effort to convince the state to cede the island, a committee of five residents was appointed by the La Crosse City Council to appear before the Minnesota Legislature. This and another 1913 plea were unsuccessful. A bill, offering Minnesota Latsch Island near Winona, was introduced in 1915 and again in 1917. The two states eventually agreed to trade islands. Their respective legislatures passed acts in 1918 which officially altered the border. The state line between Wisconsin and Minnesota had been in the center of the main channel of the Mississippi river; the agreement moved the border to the center of the west channel near La Crosse, which placed Barron Island within Wisconsin's territory. The redrawing of the border was officially approved by the U.S. Congress and President Woodrow Wilson in 1919.

Along with the park itself, Pettibone gifted the city $50,000 to maintain it. Because of his endowment, the park initially ran independent of city funding. It was overseen by the Pettibone Park Commission, a nonprofit board with six members, one of which was always the city's mayor. After the commission's establishment, it only met annually.

Because of the island's originally swampy nature, it is prone to seasonal flooding along with rising water levels of the Mississippi. The park's original landscape architect, Frank Nutter, installed some level of flood protection during initial construction, but these proved insufficient. Two floods in the 1960s severely battered the island; they damaged its bridges, cottages, and boat club. The park's commission was unable to fund the necessary repairs independently. Its members readily agreed to turn full control of the park and its remaining trust fund over to the city of La Crosse in 1969. The city's Common Council Finance Committee voted unanimously to fully incorporate it into its Department of Parks, Recreation, and Forestry in order to fund and oversee its repair.

== Facilities ==
The park's octagonal pavilion was constructed from Minnesotan red stone and dedicated in 1903. After Pettibone's death, a large stone was placed near the pavilion in his memory. The memorial, a 21-ton stone with a plaque, was proposed by John Nolen. The stone was transported to La Crosse from Milwaukee by railcar. Once in La Crosse, it had to be moved to Pettibone Park via a barge that had been borrowed from the federal government, as it was too heavy for the park's wagon bridge.

The beach house, constructed during the 1920s, was designed by Otto Merman. The adjoining beach has a volleyball court in addition to canoe and kayak rentals.

During the 1920s, the park's commission began leasing land on the southern part of the island for the construction of cottages. This practice gained popularity in the 1950s, but was ended by the city in the late 1970s. the last cottages were evicted in 1983. Today, several offshore houseboats are still located on the southern end of the island.

During the 1950s, the commission also began leasing land to the Pettibone Boat Club. Their original agreement granted the club land for a clubhouse and a marina for only one dollar a year in addition to providing a $15,000 loan. Today, the boat club is still operational at the island's southern tip and has a restaurant and marina.

== Gallery ==
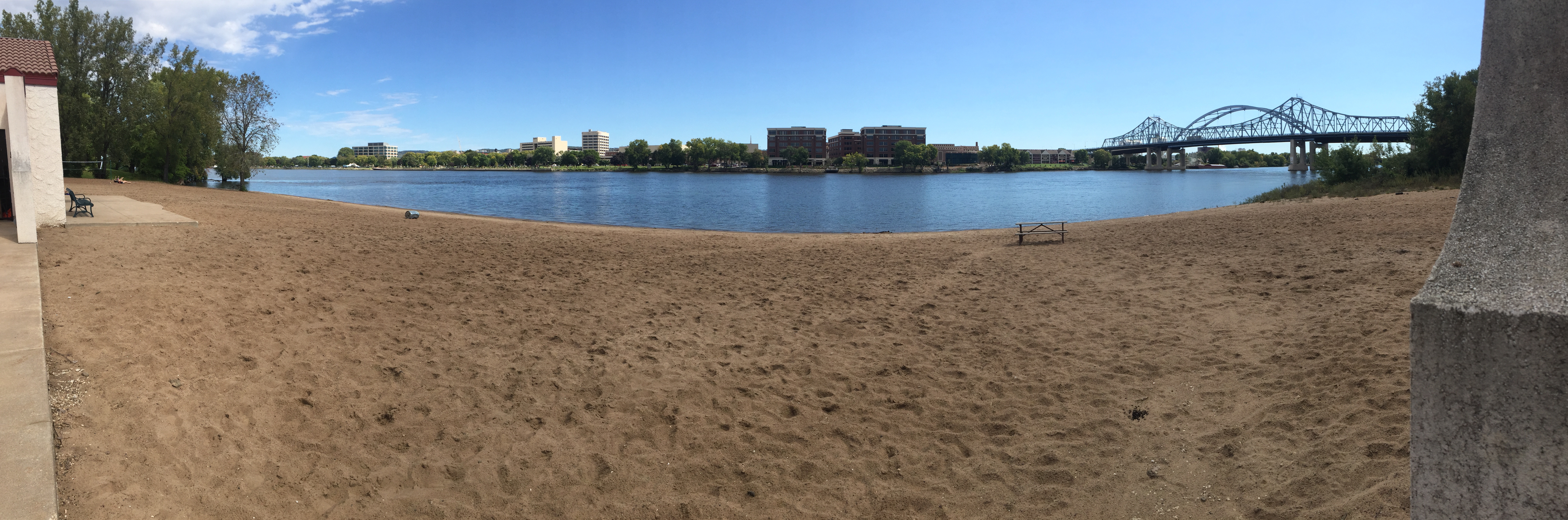
Pettibone Beach

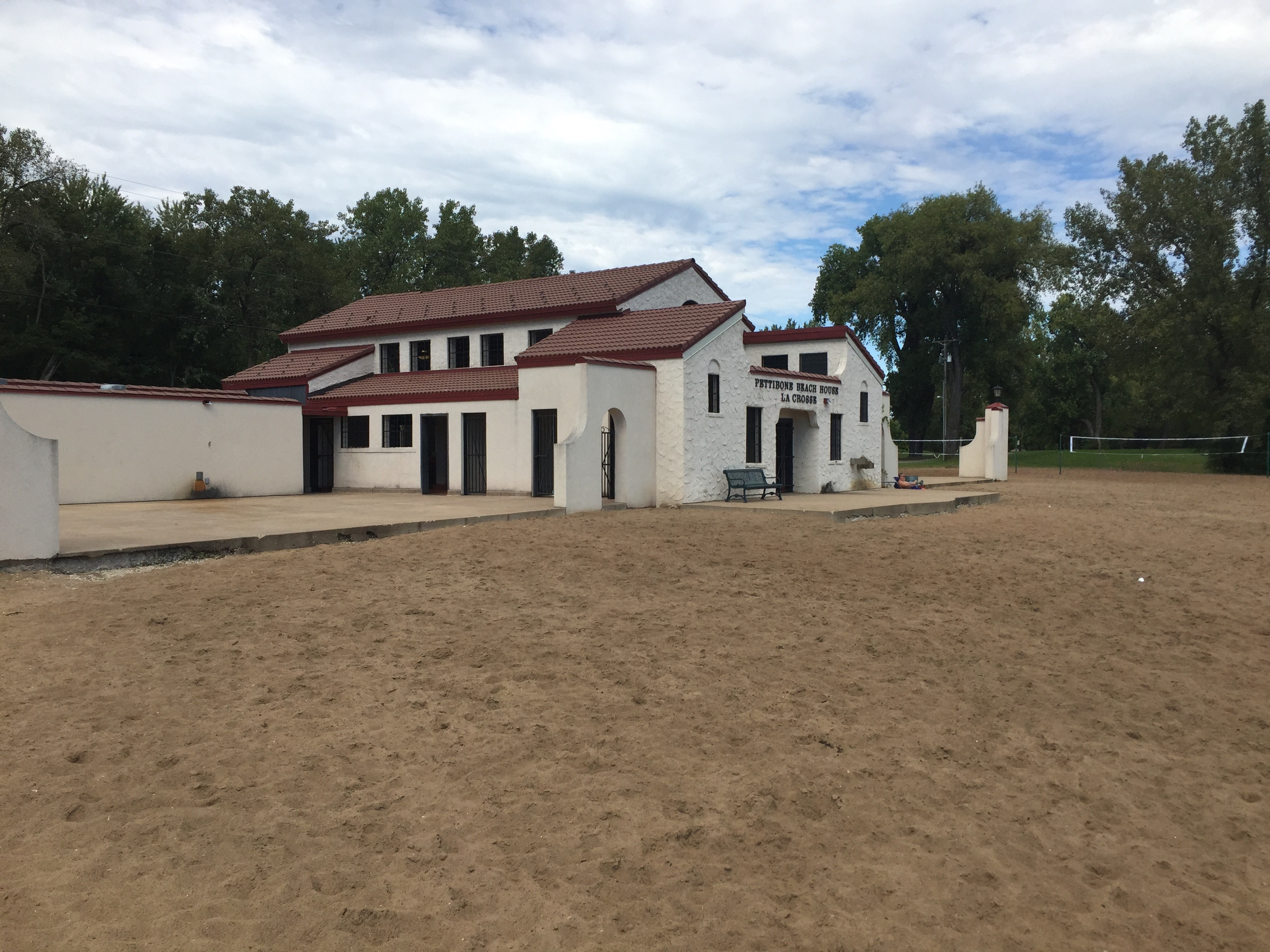
Pettibone Beach House

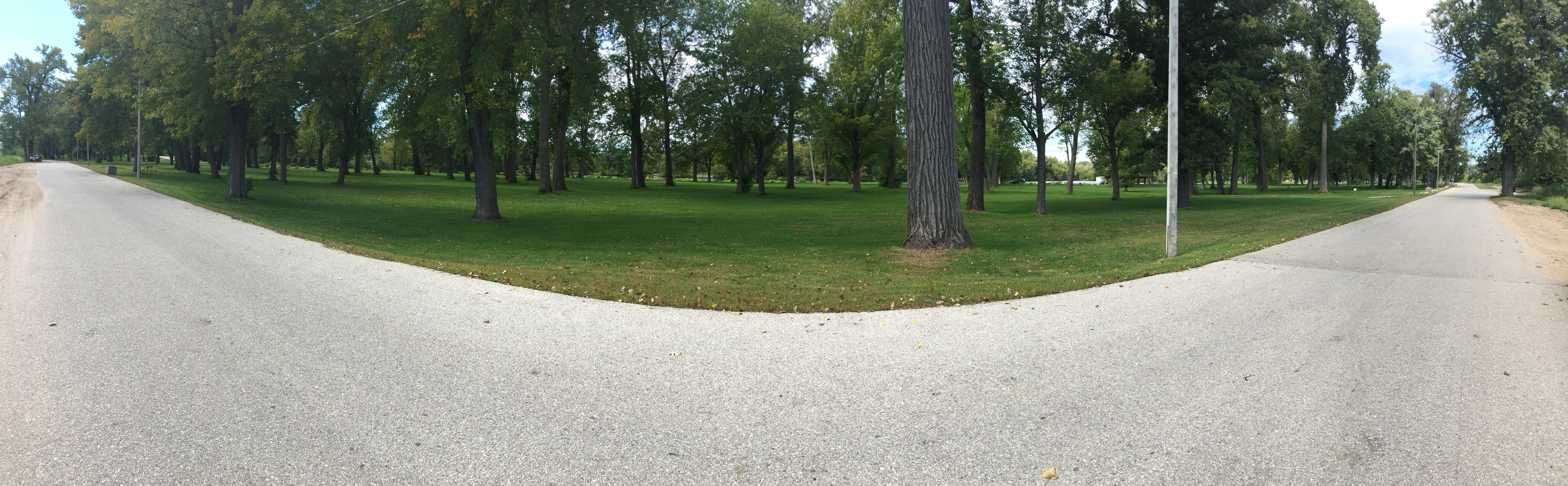
Pettibone Park disc golf area

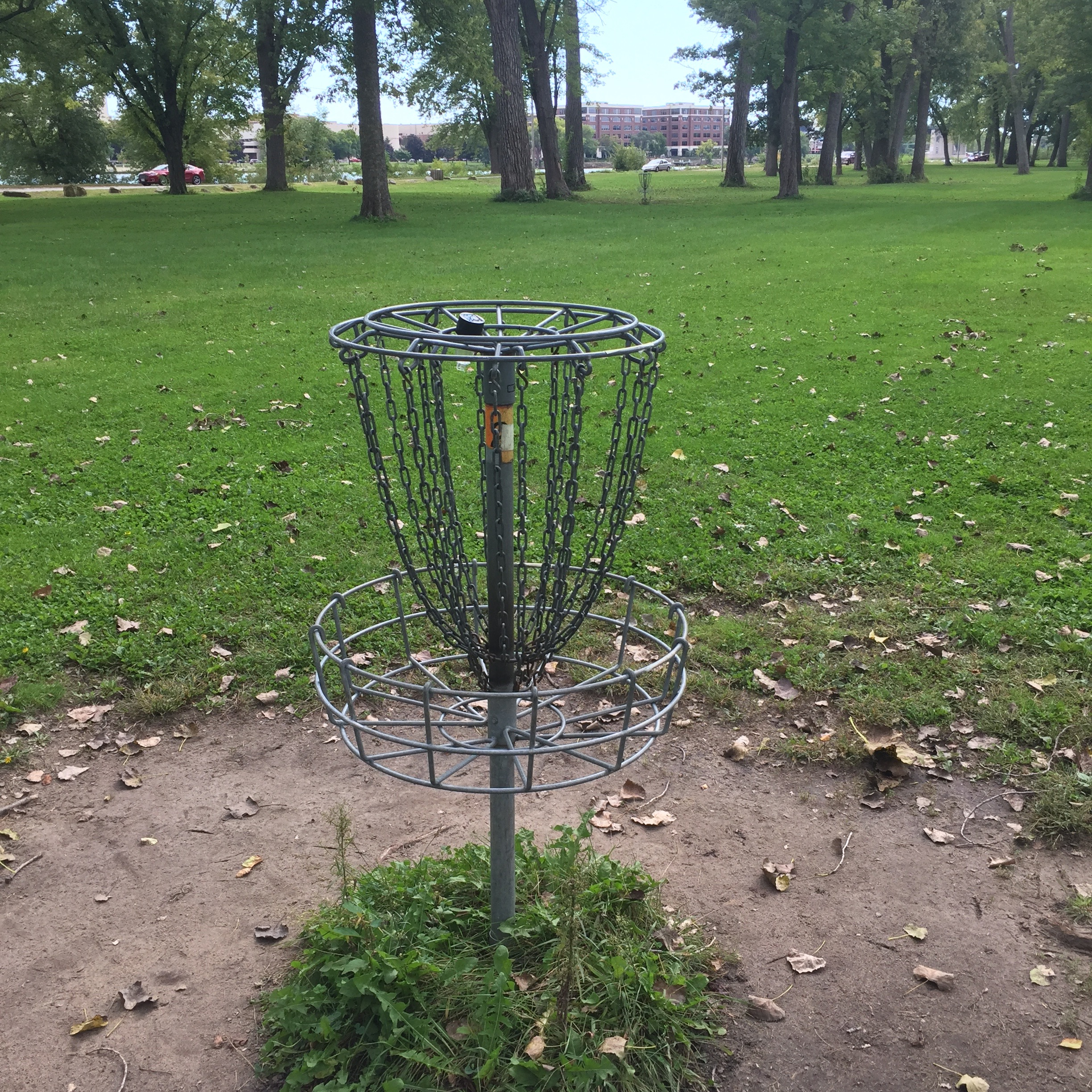
Pettibone disc golf hole

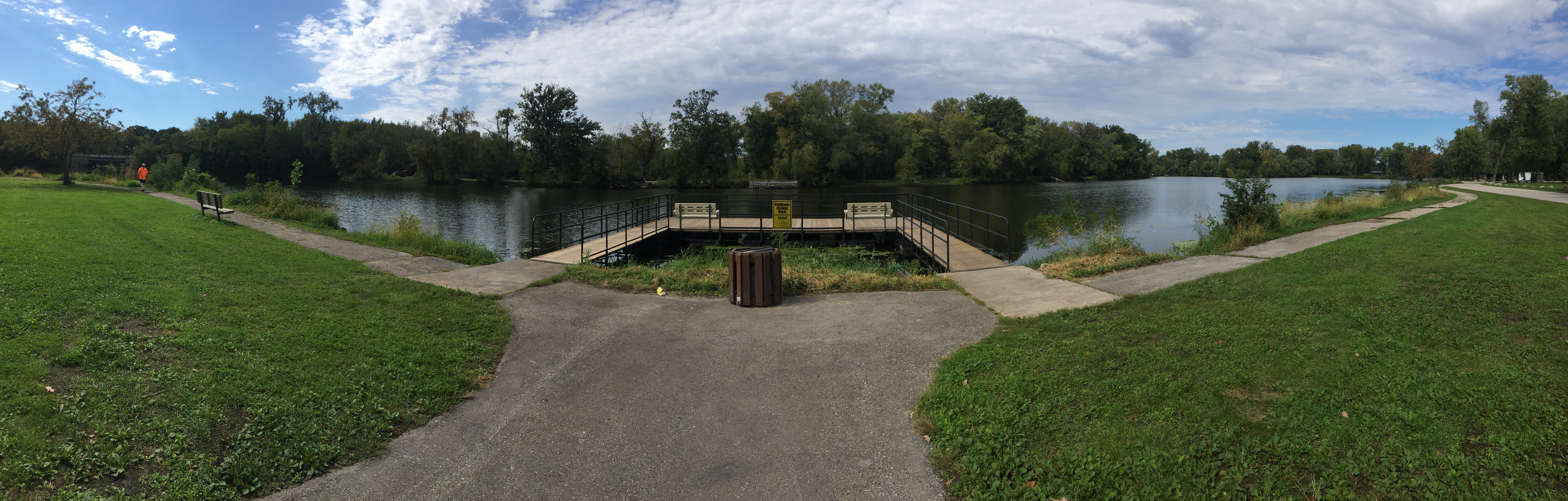
Pettibone Park fishing spot and kayaking canoeing lagoon

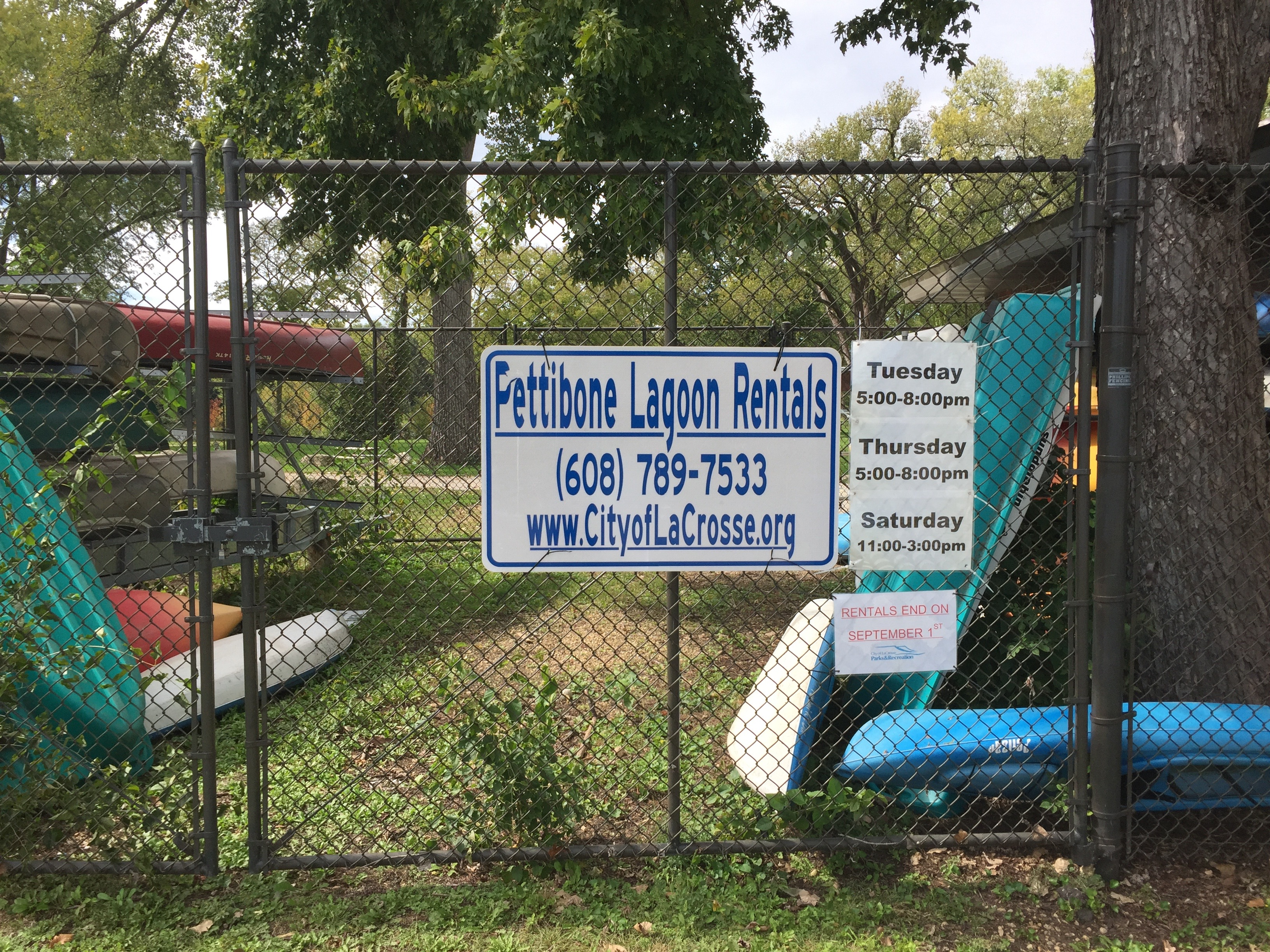
Pettibone Park canoe rentals

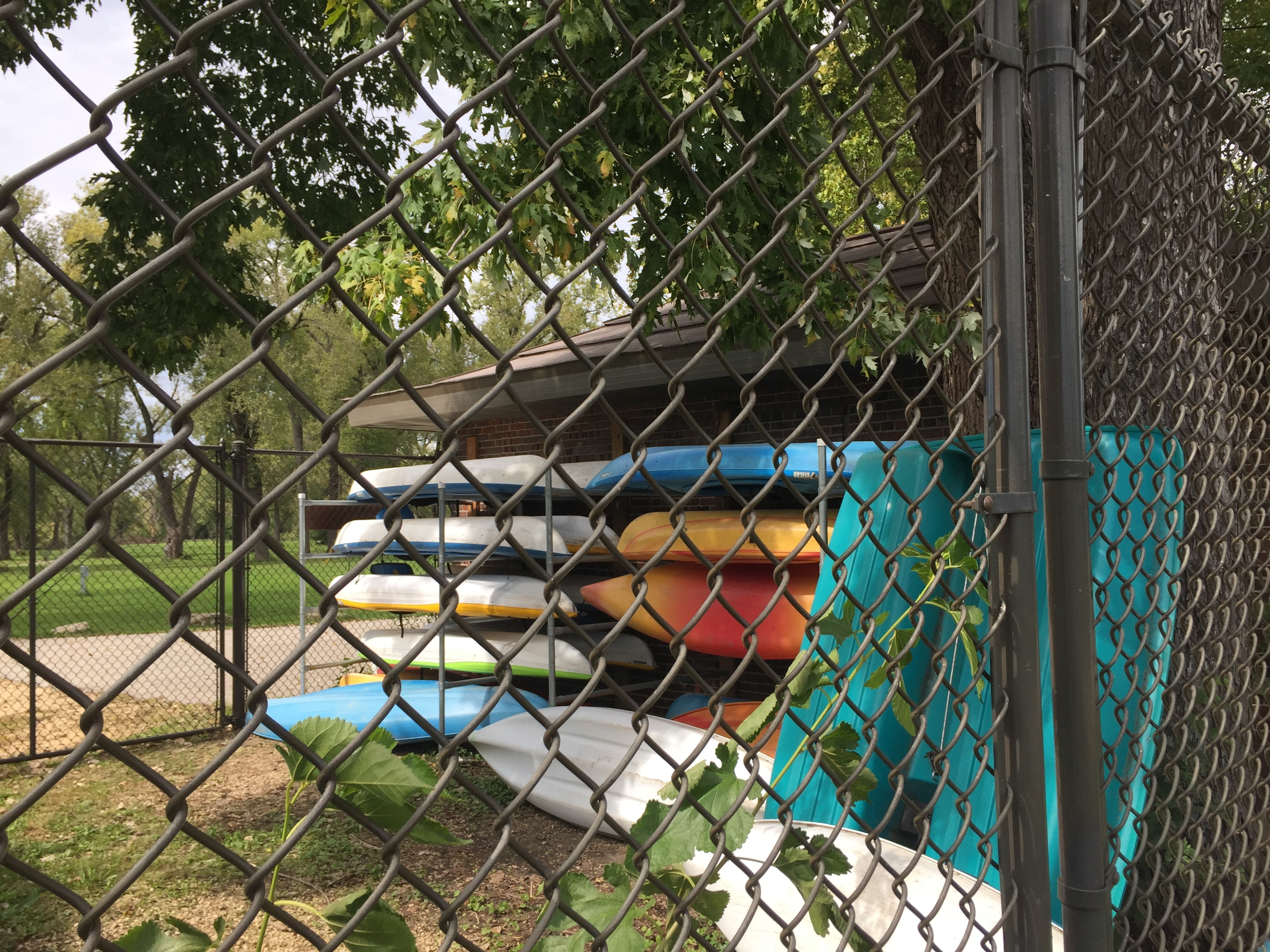
Pettibone Park kayak rentals

== See also ==
- Riverside Park (La Crosse)
- Copeland Park (La Crosse)
