= World's Largest Buffalo =

Sculpture in Jamestown, North Dakota, United States

Coordinates: 46.889290°N 98.698505°W

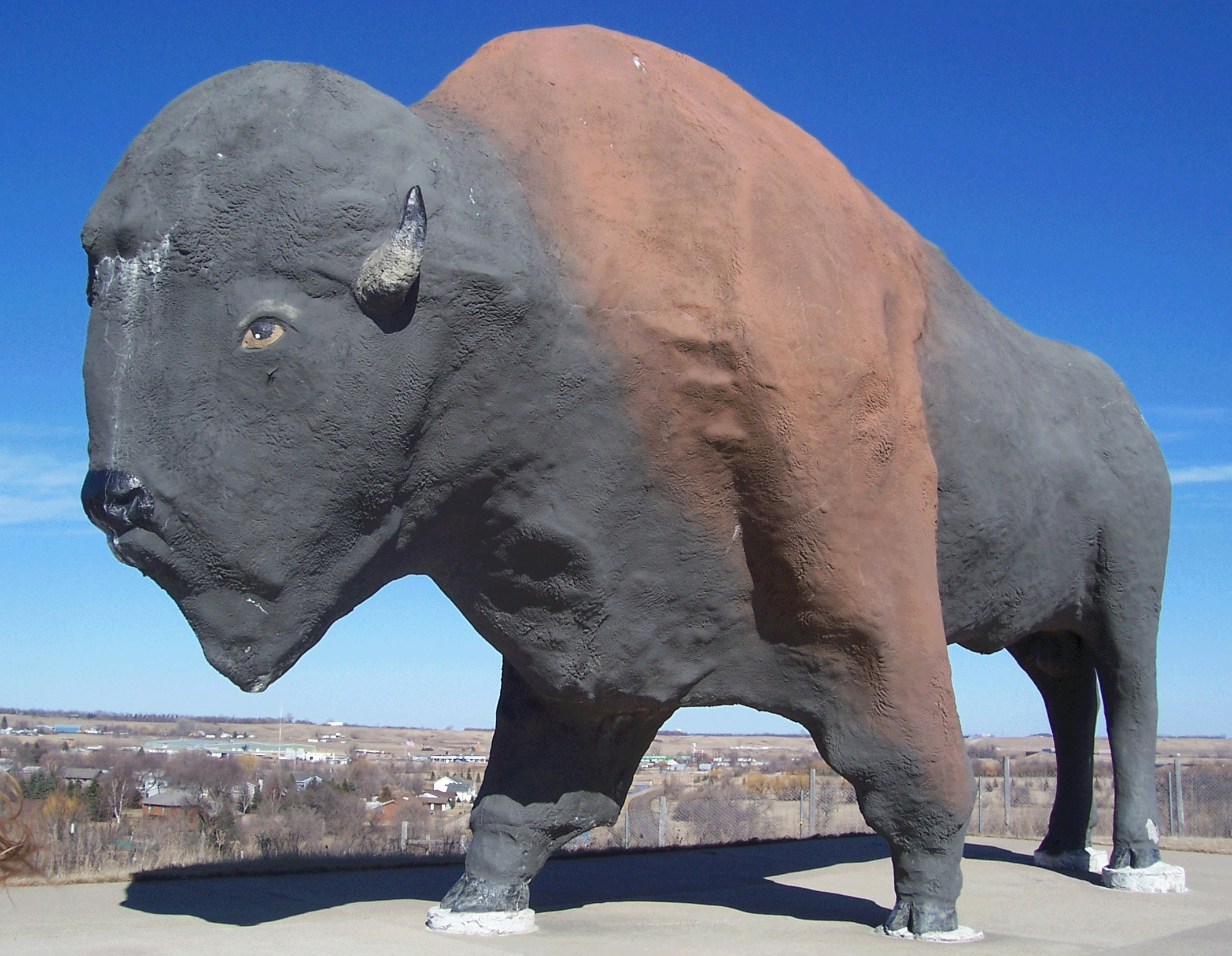
- Year: 1959
- Medium: Sculpture
- Subject: American bison

World's Largest Buffalo is a sculpture of an American bison located in Jamestown, North Dakota, United States, at the Frontier Village. It is visible from Interstate 94, overlooking the city from above the James River valley. The statue is a significant tourist draw for Jamestown and the source of its nickname, The Buffalo City.

== Description ==
The sculpture is 26 feet (7.9 m) tall and 46 feet (14 m) long and weighs 60 short tons (54 t). It was constructed with stucco and cement around a steel beam frame shaped with wire mesh.

The sculpture is complete in many respects of detail. It is sculptured after a male bison in mid-stride and is anatomically correct.

== History ==
The sculpture was commissioned in 1959 by local businessman Harold Newman, designed by Elmer Petersen, Jamestown College Art Professor and sculptor, and constructed under Peterson's supervision by professional construction workers and community members.

The final construction cost was approximately US$8,500 in 1969; a significant overrun from initial estimates closer to $4,600. The concrete slab that lies under the sculpture was added later and was not included in the initial cost.

When originally constructed, the statue stood alone on a hill south of Jamestown. Beginning in the mid-1960s, the city began expanding the site with the collection of a small number of historic buildings moved there in an attempt to recreate the look of a small Midwestern town in the 1800s. Named Frontier Village, the project has grown over the years to encompass several acres (hectares) with a complex of buildings and other attractions, including the National Buffalo Museum. However, the Buffalo remains the featured attraction.

In June 2007, the city of Jamestown received a grant of $16,500 from Hampton Hotels' Save-A-Landmark program to refurbish the buffalo. The money was used to repaint the buffalo to look more lifelike and to enlarge the horns. Original designer Elmer Petersen directly oversaw the renovation.

On July 24, 2010, the World's Largest Buffalo was named "Dakota Thunder", after a contest that drew more than 3,500 entries.
