= Elmer Petersen =

American sculptor (1928–2020)

- Born: September 4, 1928; Racine, Wisconsin, United States
- Died: August 5, 2020 (aged 91); La Crosse, Wisconsin, United States
- Education: Leo Steppat, Prof. of Sculpture, University of Wisconsin–Madison
- Known for: sculpture
- Notable work: World's Largest Buffalo, La Crosse Players, Eagle in La Crosse's Riverside Park (La Crosse)
- Spouse: Carole Elaine Mortvedt (m. 1968; died 2001)
- Elected: chairman of the Downtown La Crosse Sculpture Project Committee
- Website: sculpture-in-metal.com

Elmer Paul Petersen (September 4, 1928 – August 5, 2020) was an American sculptor who worked in metal. His most prominent artwork is the World's Largest Buffalo in Jamestown, North Dakota. Petersen lived and worked in Galesville, Wisconsin. Much of his art is publicly displayed around La Crosse, Wisconsin, where he led the Downtown La Crosse Sculpture Project Committee. The La Crosse Tribune called Petersen "one of the premier sculptors in the Coulee Region" and "instrumental in getting public sculpture scattered throughout downtown" La Crosse. He has worked significantly with welding, including that of found metal objects, and often sculpted in cast bronze.

While at Dana College, Petersen was drafted in the middle of his education, then returned on the GI Bill to do graduate work in art at the University of Wisconsin. Early in his career, Petersen taught at the University of Jamestown, North Dakota, where he sculpted a large buffalo that is still an important landmark of the city and the namesake of its moniker "Buffalo City". Petersen worked and taught at Texas Lutheran University before returning to Wisconsin in 1978 and opening an art studio.

Petersen received thirteen awards out of 23 juried shows. In 2007, he displayed a collection at The Danish Immigrant Museum in Elk Horn, Iowa. Roger D. Roslansky, Chair of Board, HSR Associates of La Crosse, remarked that Petersen was "an invaluable resource and an extremely creative artist," "a sculptor of significant note!"

His death was announced on August 5, 2020, aged 91. Petersen died from Acute Myeloid leukemia and pneumonia at Gundersen Lutheran Medical Center in La Crosse, Wisconsin.

== Works ==
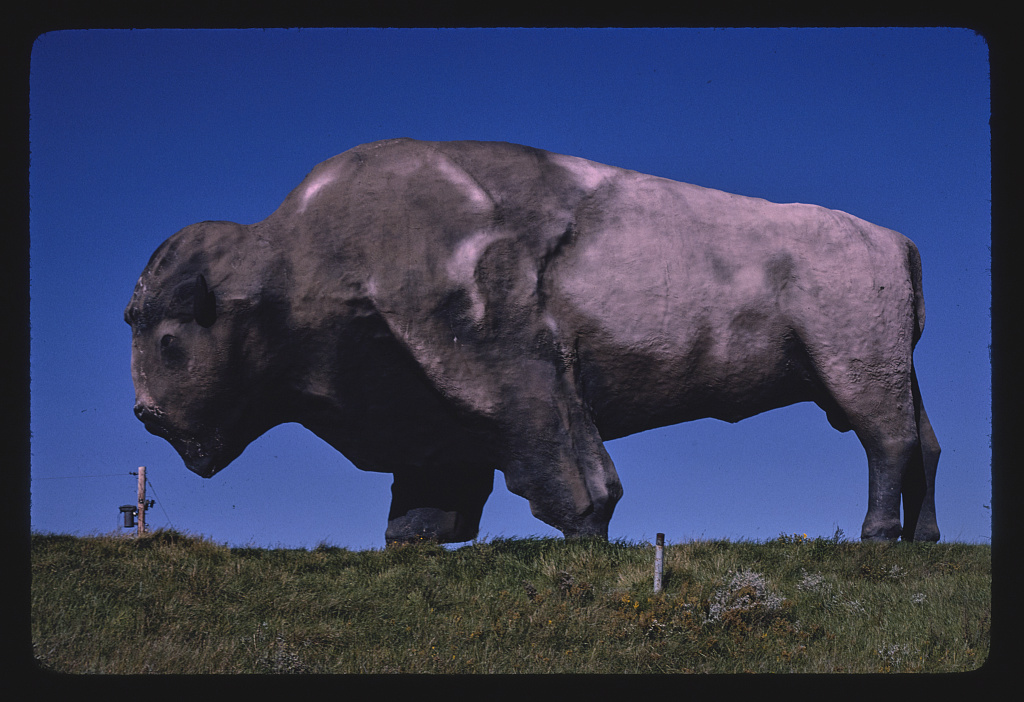
World's Largest Buffalo in Jamestown, North Dakota

- World's Largest Buffalo, Jamestown, ND.
- Martin Luther sculpture at Texas Lutheran University, Seguin, TX.
- Bicentennial Monument, Jamestown, ND.
- La Crosse Players, La Crosse, Wisconsin; a replica is at the Rose Street city entrance
- Eagle, Riverside Park, La Crosse, Wisconsin, a large statue of 14-gauge weathering steel depicting a tree trunk with bald eagle atop it, clutching fish in its talons
- Head of Sculptor
- Gambrinus, "King of Beer," Heileman brewery, La Crosse, WI.
- Family, Gundersen Lutheran Medical Center, La Crosse, WI.
- Boy with Butterfly, Gundersen Lutheran Medical Center lobby, La Crosse, WI.
- Master and Disciple, Lutheran Church of the Master, Edina, MN.
- Eagle Landmark, La Crosse, WI.
- Eagle and Eternal Flame, Veterans' Memorial Stadium, U. of Wisconsin-La Crosse.
- The Visionary, Galesville, WI.
- Gideon Hixon statue
- George Frost Kennan, Truman Presidential Library and Museum, Independence, MO.
- D.B. Reinhart, Aquinas H.S, La Crosse, WI.
- George Gale, Galesville, WI.
- Rev. David O. Van Slyke, Galesville Methodist pastor and farmer, depicted with apple and Bible, in a statue on edge of downtown Galesville, WI.
- Symphonic Joy (2015), stained glass, Viterbo University campus
- George Coleman Poage, first African-American Olympic medalist, Poage Park, La Crosse, WI.

== Bibliography ==
- Parlin, Geri (September 6, 2008). "Elmer at 80: Hand Petersen the welding torch — there's more art to create". La Crosse Tribune.
- "Elmer Petersen's Sculptures on Display" (PDF). The Danish Immigrant Museum. Spring 2007. Archived from the original (PDF) on July 29, 2014.
- "Local roots: artists and entertainers with ties to La Crosse". La Crosse Tribune. February 24, 2013.
- Video with interview at "Buffalo Sculptor Elmer Petersen passes,91".
