= Copeland Park =

Baseball stadium in La Crosse, Wisconsin, US

- The Lumber Yard
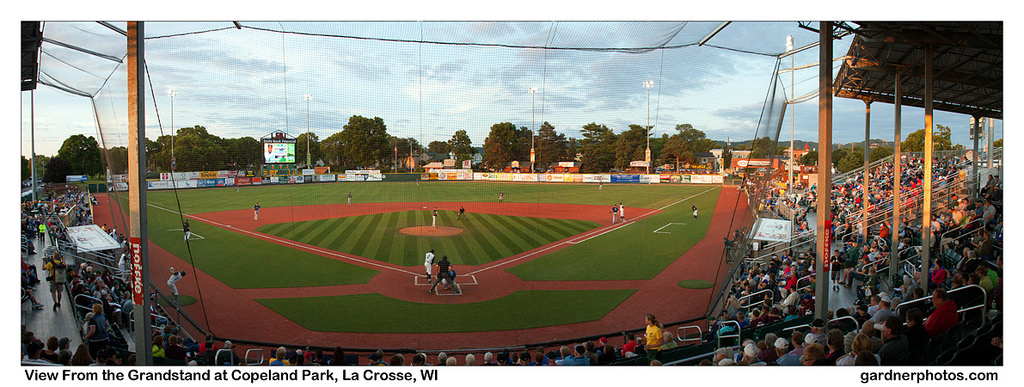
- Interactive map of Copeland Park
- Location: 800 Copeland Ave. La Crosse, Wisconsin
- Coordinates: 43.836284°N 91.251358°W
- Owner: City of La Crosse
- Capacity: 3,550
- Surface: Artificial turf (infield); Natural grass (outfield)
- Field size: Left: 325 feet (99 m); Center: 365 feet (111 m); Right: 315 feet (96 m)
- Public transit: MTU: 6

Construction
- Opened: 2003

Tenants
- La Crosse Loggers (NWL) 2003–present UW-La Crosse (NCAA) 2014–present La Crosse Steam (NWL) 2024–present

Copeland Park, also referred to as "The Lumber Yard", is a stadium in La Crosse, Wisconsin, US. It is primarily used for baseball and is the home field of the La Crosse Loggers baseball team. The current stadium was built in 2003, although a substantially smaller baseball diamond existed at the site before the construction of the new ballpark. At the time of its construction, the stadium held approximately 2,000 people. However, the success of the Loggers prompted expansions to the grandstand, bringing the capacity to its current 3,550 people. The field dimensions are 325 ft. to left field, 365 ft. to center, and 315 ft. to right.

== Upgrades ==
On May 10, 2012, the La Crosse Loggers and University of Wisconsin–La Crosse athletic department announced a partnership to allow for the UW-La Crosse baseball team to play at Copeland Park. In exchange, the venue had upgrades of an artificial turf infield, a videoboard addition to the scoreboard in left field and batting cages. UW-La Crosse began playing at Copeland Park in 2014.

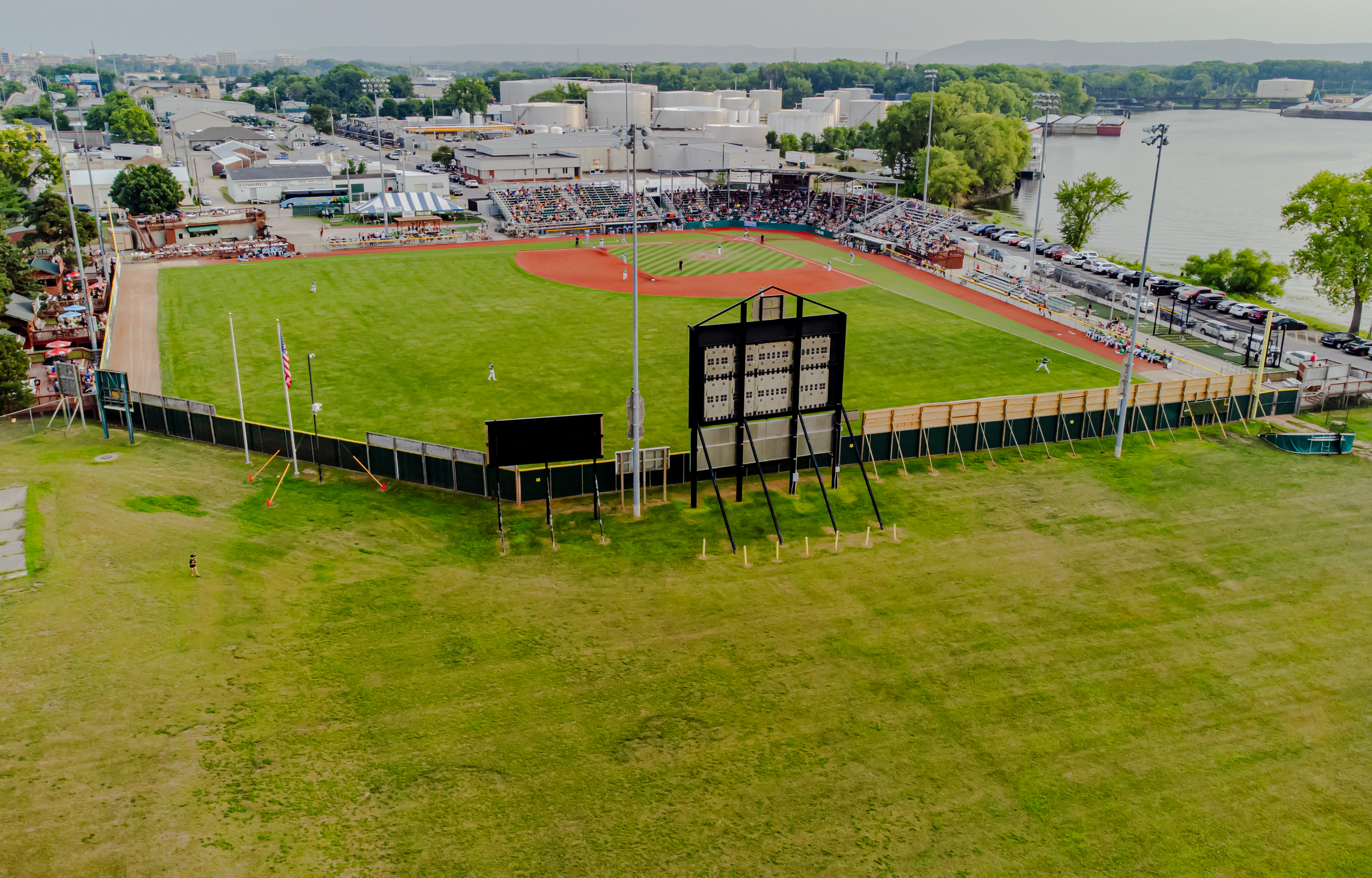
La Crosse Loggers Copeland Park

== Notable events ==
Copeland Park hosted the 2006 Northwoods League All-Star Game on July 12, 2006. The North Division defeated the South Division 3–2 in 11 innings in front of 3,413 fans, the second-largest crowd in the game's history.

== See also ==
- Pettibone Park (La Crosse)
- Riverside Park (La Crosse)
