= Oktoberfest (La Crosse, Wisconsin) =

American festival

Oktoberfest, USA
- Organization logo
- Status: Active
- Genre: Festival
- Begins: End of September
- Frequency: Annually
- Location: La Crosse, Wisconsin
- Founded: 1961
- Attendance: 150,000
- Major events: Parades, food, music
- Website: http://www.oktoberfestusa.com/Home.aspx

Oktoberfest, USA is an annual celebration held in La Crosse, Wisconsin, United States, usually on the final week of September and into the beginning of October. It is one of the largest, and longest running Oktoberfest celebrations in the Midwestern United States. The celebration was first held in 1961, and today draws crowds of up to 150,000 people annually.

The festival celebrates the city's brewing tradition and German heritage. Fest-goers often wear Bavarian dirndls and lederhosen, and German-American polka is common. The celebration is marked by several annual events, including parades, balls, pageants, and concerts.

== History ==
Until 1921, La Crosse had hosted a winter carnival every year. Following economic difficulties around 1960, many civic leaders were in favor of renewing a similar community-wide festival. Rather than contend with other regional winter festivals and unpredictable weather, a fall festival was deemed favorable. During the fall of 1960, several officials of the La Crosse-based G. Heileman Brewing Company were also discussing an annual promotion. News of these discussions spread through the firm, eventually reaching the malt house, where two of the employees of German origin suggested an autumn festival similar to the Oktoberfest held annually in Munich. The idea was quickly accepted. In 1961, brewery officials contacted the La Crosse Chamber of Commerce and proposed the idea to chamber members. It was accepted, and both agreed that the chamber would act as the sponsoring organization.

Civic leaders Joseph Becker, Carl Mertens, Bruce Hines, D.J. Petruccelli, Robert Mehren, Ross Hunt, Art Dugan, Harold Lee, Gerald Heberlein, D.D. Dickson and Robert McCann, brainstormed ideas for the festival and came up with five objectives: promote city pride, obtain national publicity, promote tourism, involve a lot of people, and make the fest a financial success.

=== First Oktoberfest ===
The first Oktoberfest in La Crosse was held October 13–15, 1961 in a location between the post office and Mary E. Sawyer auditorium. A carnival area was also set up in the First Federal Savings & Loan parking lot at 6th & State St. Among the festivities were farm fair events including cow chip throwing and greased pig contests. Antique steam engines demonstrated the area's early lumber industry. Other activities included soccer matches, scenic boat and bus trips, a youth tent, as well as square dances, German music, and a “Queen Pageant.”

In addition, a parade was held. The 4-mile, three and a half-hour parade drew an estimated 30,000-50,000 spectators in 1961. 1962, the parade would be given the name “Maple Leaf Parade” at the suggestion of Terry Witzke, a teacher at Emerson Elementary school, in appreciation for La Crosse's landscape. That year, the parade drew 70,000 spectators from around the Midwest. In 1963, the parade drew 200,000. A second parade, named the Torchlight parade, was added in 1965 to showcase the north side of La Crosse.

=== Timeline ===
In 1962, the name "Oktoberfest" was registered with the State of Wisconsin and the festival was extended to four days, from October 4–7. In 1963, "Oktoberfest, USA" was registered and listed as a trademark with the federal government. In 1965, the newly formed La Crosse Festivals, Inc., purchased the assets of Oktoberfest from the Chamber of Commerce and officially became the sponsoring organization.

In 1965, the North Side Fest Grounds were created at the intersection of Rose and Clinton Streets (in Copeland Park) to coincide with the Torchlight parade. The North Side grounds were developed as the family grounds featuring carnival rides and games as well a small beer tent. The original fest grounds, now known as the South Side Fest Grounds, moved from its original location in 1971 to a new location at 2nd and La Crosse Streets (1 Oktoberfest Straße) where a $20,000 permanent structure known as “The Bier Hall” was constructed. A permanent shelter was constructed at Copeland Park in 1984 to be used for protection during Oktoberfest and in winter as an ice rink with an accompanying warming house.

The inaugural Burgermeister Dinner was held in 1978, which evolved into what became the Burgermeister Breakfast. The breakfast honors the mayor and other city and council leaders. In 1989, the first “Special Fester”, an area child with special needs, was named. The Special Fester participated in many Royal Family activities and oversaw Special Fester Day, a weekday of free carnival rides and activities for area children with special needs. Miranda Roberts of Onalaska was the first honoree.

The festival was expanded from its original 4 days to 9 days in 2000. It was also named in a USA Today article as “one of the best Old-World folk festivals in the U.S.” The festival was shortened back down to its original 4 days in 2014 due to the festival losing money three of the previous four years. In an effort to help fund Oktoberfest activities, the first Wienerfest was held in 2007. This annual event is held in spring with its profits going to the fall Oktoberfest celebrations.

In 2018, La Crosse Oktoberfest changed the method of entry. Originally, festgoers were able to enter the fest ground after purchasing an official Oktoberfest USA button. In order to better keep track of the number of people entering the grounds, they developed a printed pass with a bar code that is scanned prior to entry.

In 2020, the festival was cancelled for the first time after 59 years due to the COVID-19 pandemic and resumed in 2021.

== Traditions ==
Oktoberfest celebrations highlight the city's historically large number of breweries and present-day craft breweries. More significantly, the festival centers upon the German heritage of many early immigrants to the region through Bavarian music, foods such as bratwurst and sauerkraut, and traditional Bavarian clothing, such as dirndls and lederhosen.

Over time, additional festivities have been added to the celebrations including the traditional “Tapping of the Golden Keg” ceremony which officially begins Oktoberfest. The "golden keg" is then accompanied by the Edelweiss Parade to the fest grounds. Since 1969 there has also been an annual Oktoberfest auto race held at La Crosse Fairgrounds Speedway. A Medallion Hunt was established in 1971, and later a Ladies Day Luncheon, Lederhosen Luncheon, Kartenspiele (card games), Dachshund Dash, Viener Vogue, Hammerschlagen, and Craft Beer Night. In 1976, the festival added the Maple Leaf Marathon, which is now known as the YMCA Maple Leaf Walk-Run Half Marathon, held on Saturday during the fest.

The schedule of events for the La Crosse Oktoberfest include:

- Tapping of the Golden Keg
- Torchlight Parade
- Mapleleaf Parade
- Parade Marshal Announcement
- Festmaster's Ball
- Special Fester Ball
- Mrs. Oktoberfest Reception
- Miss La Crosse/Oktoberfest USA Scholarship Pageant
- Oktoberfest USA Medallion Hunt

=== Oktoberfest Royal Family ===
In 1962, the position of Festmaster was created. This person was to be chosen based on his contributions to the community, as well as being a good family man with a reputation for honesty and integrity, successful in his chosen profession, along with other characteristics. The first Festmaster in 1962 was Don Rice, President of Exchange State Bank. Today, the Festmaster is the head of the Oktoberfest Royal Family and ceremonially oversees all events and festivities.

A "Queen Pageant" has been held since the fest's inception in 1961. The winner of that first pageant was Marlene Schultz, an 18-year-old from Winona, MN. In 1964 the Miss La Crosse pageant merged with the Miss Oktoberfest pageant to become Miss La Crosse Oktoberfest. In 1968, the title of Mrs. Oktoberfest was created. The first winner was Joyce Lindseth. In 1971 the Festmaster's Grenadier Corps was created to appear at Oktoberfest events along with the royal family.

=== Beer tents ===
As beer is an important part of the original Oktoberfest celebration in Germany, the La Crosse Oktoberfest has always had a beer tent as part of the festivities. G. Heileman Brewing Company was the official supplier of beer during the fest's early years. While this beer tent worked in the early years of the fest, by 1966, the beer tent was marked by “rowdiness and excessive drinking” which caused chaos in the aftermath as swarms of teenagers mobbed the bars in downtown La Crosse after the tent closed down. In response, the festival organizers in 1967 closed the beer tent and changed the focus to dairy products. This decision left the festival in a financial deficit. In 1968, the festival organization, Oktoberfest U.S.A., decided to promote the festival as a family event while bringing back the beer tent. They raised the drinking age inside the tent to 21 years old to cut down on the excessive drinking. Through 70s, 80s, and 90s, the South Side beer tent had its share of issues, especially the problem of beer throwing among the younger beer tent crowd. In response, the festival increased security and added local police to quell this habit.
