= Wisconsin Highway 130 =

State highway in Wisconsin, United States

State Trunk Highway 130
- WIS 130 highlighted in red

Route information
- Maintained by WisDOT
- Length: 31.40 mi (50.53 km)

Major junctions
- South end: WIS 23 in Dodgeville
- US 14 / WIS 60 / WIS 133 in Lone Rock
- North end: WIS 154 / CTH-G in Hill Point

Location
- Country: United States
- State: Wisconsin
- Counties: Iowa, Richland, Sauk

Highway system
- Wisconsin State Trunk Highway System; Interstate; US; State; Scenic; Rustic
← WIS 129	→ WIS 131

State Trunk Highway 130 (often called Highway 130, STH-130 or WIS 130) is a state highway in the U.S. state of Wisconsin. It runs in north–south in south central Wisconsin from near Dodgeville to near Hill Point.

== Route description ==
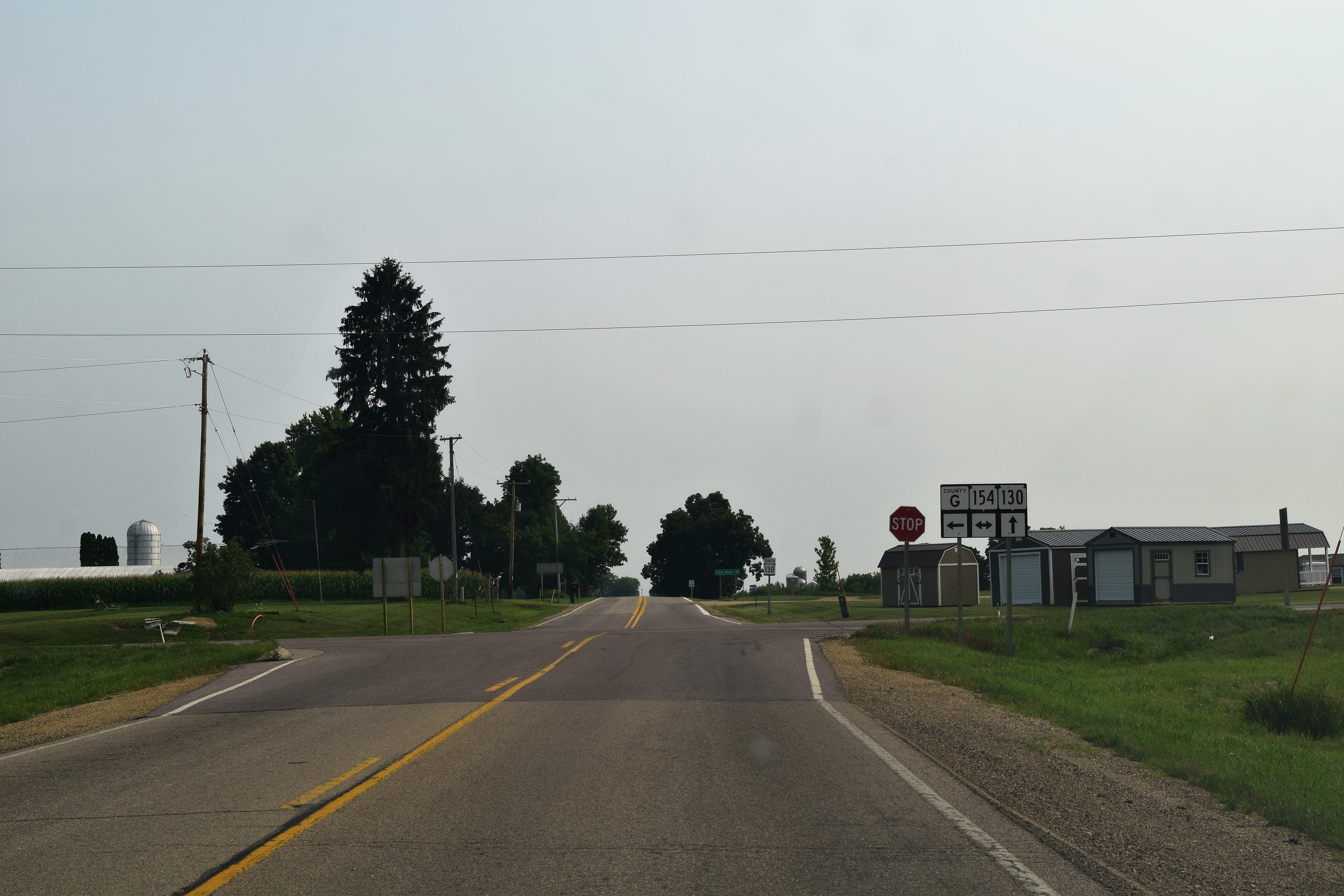
The northern terminus of WIS 130 at WIS 154

Starting at WIS 23, WIS 130 meanders northwestward and then northward, passing through Clyde. It joins with WIS 133 immediately before they cross the Wisconsin River. After crossing the river, the highways enter Lone Rock. Then, they intersect with US 14/WIS 60. At this point, WIS 133 ends while WIS 130 turns west to follow US 14. WIS 130 then turns north away from US 14 and meanders northward, passing through Bear Valley and Sandusky. The route ends at its intersection with WIS 154 north of Sandusky; the road continues north from there as part of CTH-G.

== History ==
Beginning in 1923, WIS 130 was designated along half of its present-day route from WIS 23 to WIS 41 (previously and later WIS 11, now US 14)/WIS 60 north of Lone Rock. Up until 1948, no significant changes were made to the routing. In 1948, WIS 130 was extended northward via CTH-J, CTH-N, and CTH-G. In 1949, part of the WIS 130 extension was moved northwestward away from CTH-N and CTH-G.

== Major intersections ==
County	Location	mi	km	Destinations	Notes
Iowa	Town of Dodgeville			WIS 23 – Dodgeville, Spring Green	
Iowa	Town of Clyde			WIS 133 south – Avoca	Southern end of WIS 133 overlap
Richland	Lone Rock			US 14 east / WIS 60 east / WIS 133 ends – Madison	Northern end of WIS 133 overlap; southern end of US 14 / WIS 60 overlap
Richland	Lone Rock			US 14 west / WIS 60 west – Prairie du Chien, La Crosse	Northern end of US 14 / WIS 60 overlap
Sauk	Town of Washington			WIS 154 / CTH-G – Loganville, Lime Ridge	
1.000 mi = 1.609 km; 1.000 km = 0.621 mi: Concurrency terminus
