= Prairie Sac =

Prairie du Sac is a town and village in Sauk County, Wisconsin:

- Prairie du Sac (town), Wisconsin
- Prairie du Sac (village), Wisconsin
