= Wisconsin Highway 154 =

State highway in Wisconsin, United States

State Trunk Highway 154
- WIS 154 highlighted in red

Route information
- Maintained by WisDOT
- Length: 22.54 mi (36.27 km)

Major junctions
- West end: WIS 58 in Loyd
- East end: WIS 136 in Rock Springs

Location
- Country: United States
- State: Wisconsin
- Counties: Richland, Sauk

Highway system
- Wisconsin State Trunk Highway System; Interstate; US; State; Scenic; Rustic
| ← WIS 153 | → WIS 155 |

State Trunk Highway 154 (often called Highway 154, STH-154 or WIS 154) is a state highway in the U.S. state of Wisconsin. It runs in east–west in south-central Wisconsin from near Loyd to Rock Springs.

== Route description ==
The highway begins at its intersection with WIS 58 north of the community of Neptune and follows a northeasterly path from it. After a short concurrency with County Trunk Highway G (CTH-G), it passes through Hill Point and continues east until it reaches Loganville. In Loganville, the highway becomes concurrent with WIS 23 and heads northwards. After 3.5 miles (5.6 km), the concurrency ends and the highway heads eastwards, passing through Wiedman Memorial Park and intersections with CTH-CH and CTH-D before terminating in Rock Springs at its intersection with WIS 136 and CTH-DD.

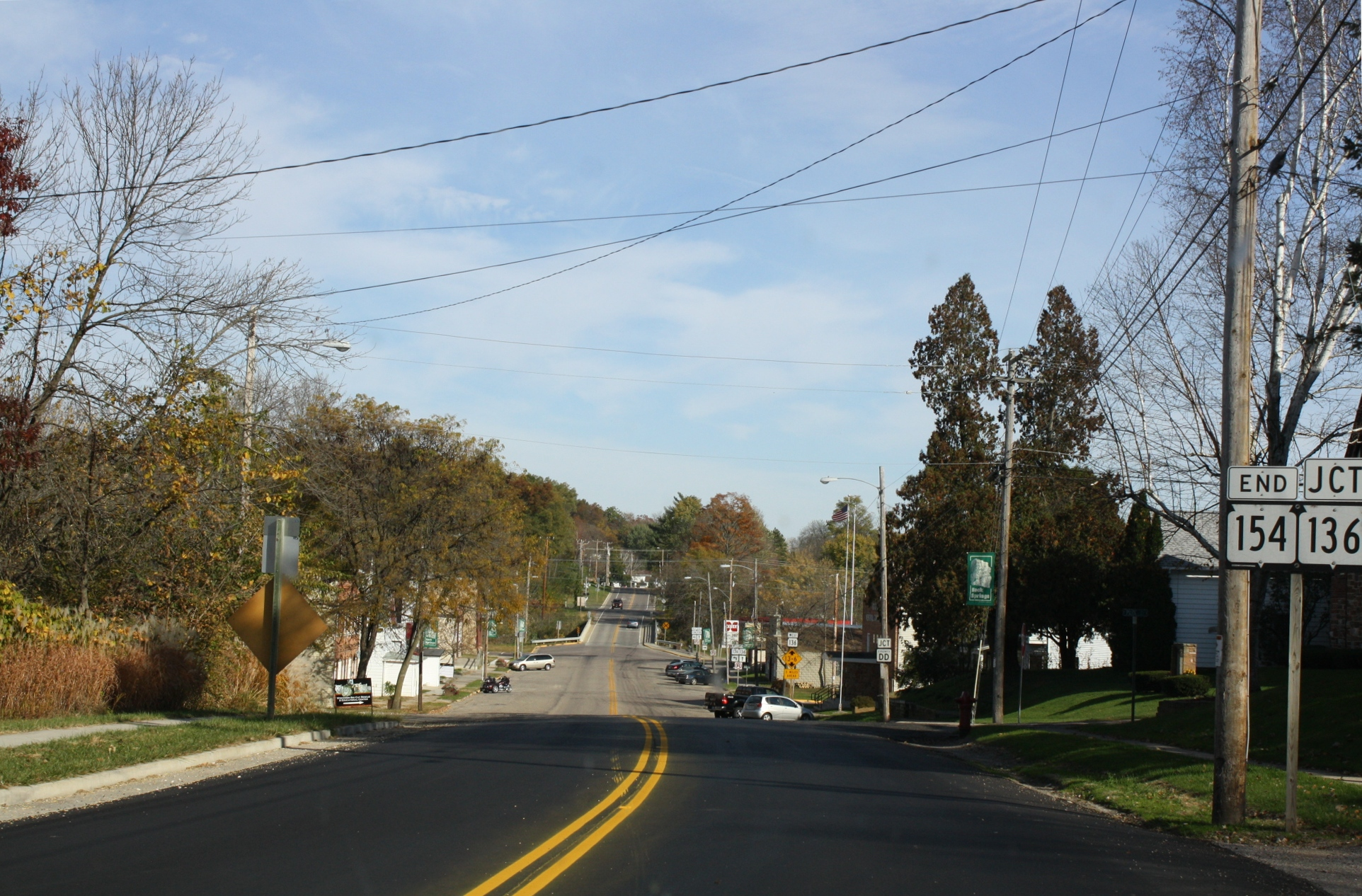
Eastern terminus

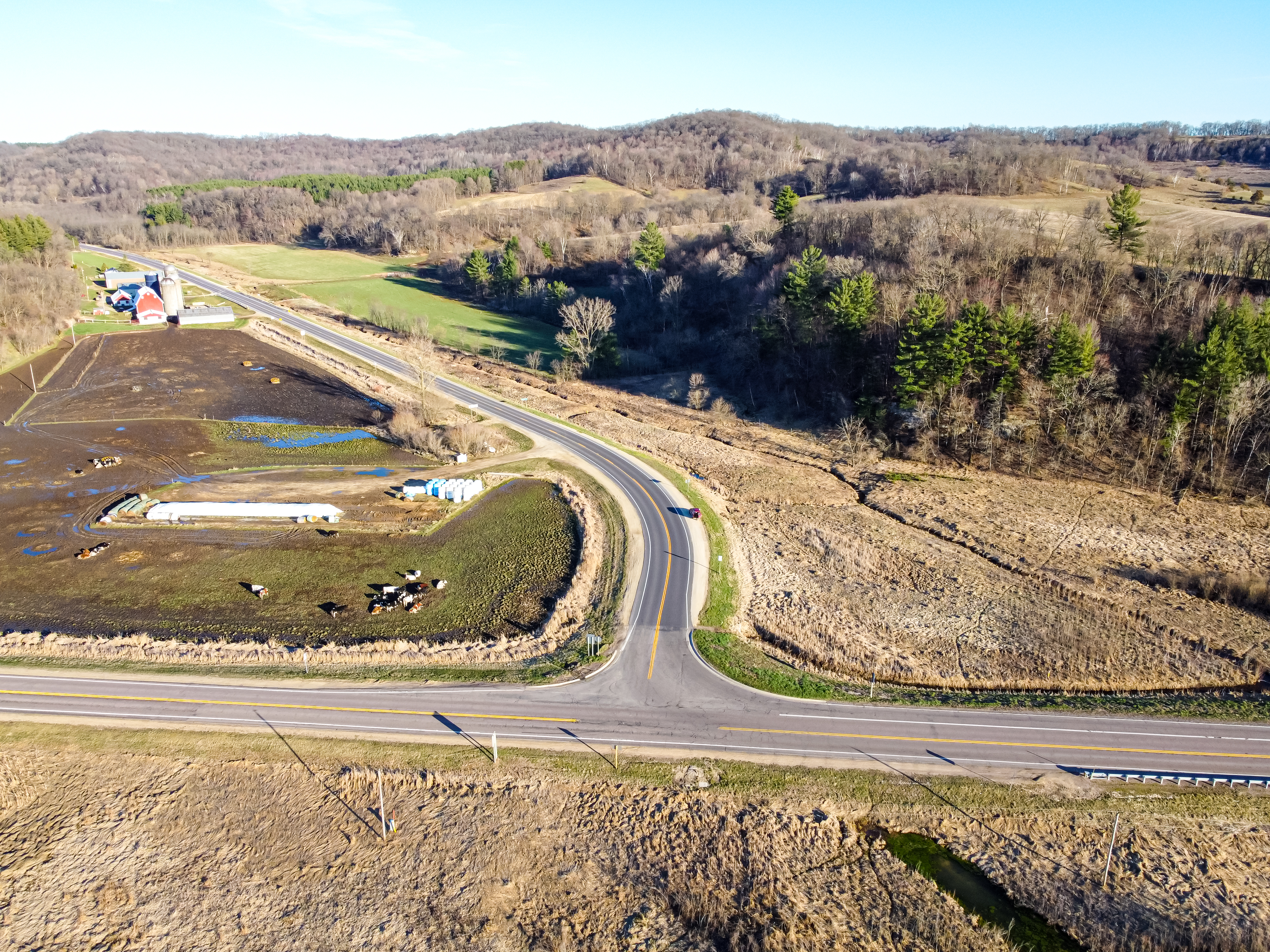
WIS 58/WIS 154 junction

== Major intersections ==
| County | Location | mi | km | Destinations | Notes |
|---|---|---|---|---|---|
| Richland | Willow | 0.0 | 0.0 | WIS 58 – Cazenovia, Richland Center | |
| Sauk | Washington | 6.0 | 9.7 | CTH-G north / WIS 130 south – Lime Ridge, Lone Rock | Western end of concurrency |
| Sauk | Washington | 7.2 | 11.6 | CTH-G south | Eastern end of concurrency |
| Sauk | Loganville | 12.8 | 20.6 | WIS 23 south – Plain | Southern end of concurrency |
| Sauk | Town of Reedsburg | 16.3 | 26.2 | WIS 23 north – Reedsburg | Northern end of concurrency |
| Sauk | Excelsior | 21.6 | 34.8 | CTH-D south | |
| Sauk | Rock Springs | 22.5 | 36.2 | WIS 136 CTH-DD south (River Street) | |
1.000 mi = 1.609 km; 1.000 km = 0.621 mi: Concurrency terminus
