= Wisconsin Highway 58 =

State highway in Wisconsin, United States

State Trunk Highway 58
- WIS 58 highlighted in red

Route information
- Maintained by WisDOT
- Length: 53.92 mi (86.78 km)

Major junctions
- South end: US 14 in Richland Center
- US 12 / WIS 16 in Mauston
- North end: WIS 80 in Necedah

Location
- Country: United States
- State: Wisconsin
- Counties: Richland, Sauk, Juneau

Highway system
- Wisconsin State Trunk Highway System; Interstate; US; State; Scenic; Rustic
← WIS 57	→ WIS 59

State Trunk Highway 58 (often called Highway 58, STH-58 or WIS 58) is a state highway in the U.S. state of Wisconsin. It runs north–south in southwest Wisconsin from the Necedah to Richland Center.

== Route description ==
WIS 58 starts at the junction with US 14 in between Richland Center and Sextonville. The highway then meanders north, passing through Aubrey, Ithaca, and Neptune. North of Neptune, it intersects WIS 154. Continuing north, it passes through Loyd, Cazenovia, Ironton, and La Valle. In La Valle, it runs concurrently with WIS 33. In Mauston, WIS 58 then runs concurrently with WIS 82, intersects US Highway 12/WIS 16 (US 12/WIS 16) and then leaves the concurrency. WIS 58 crosses over I-90/I-94 without an interchange; the Interstate can be reached via WIS 82 0.7 miles (1.1 km) to the east. Just west of the Yellow River, the highway ends at WIS 80 south of Necedah.

== History ==
Initially, WIS 58 ran from WIS 11 (now US 14) in Sextonville to WIS 33 in La Valle. In 1923, WIS 58 extended northward to WIS 12/WIS 29 (now US 12/WIS 16) in Mauston. That same year, its southern terminus moved slightly to the west, avoiding Sextonville. In 1994, another significant change was made. This time, it was extended northward to WIS 80 south of Necedah, superseding County Trunk Highway Q (CTH-Q).

== Major intersections ==
County	Location	mi	km	Destinations	Notes
Richland	Town of Richland	0.0	0.0	US 14 – Richland Center, Gotham	
Richland	Town of Willow	7.6	12.2	WIS 154 east – Loganville	
Sauk	La Valle	25.6	41.2	WIS 33 east – Reedsburg	Southern end of WIS 33 concurrency
Sauk	Town of La Valle	26.5	42.6	WIS 33 west – Wonewoc	Northern end of WIS 33 concurrency
Juneau	Mauston	40.9	65.8	WIS 82 west – Elroy	Southern end of WIS 82 concurrency
Juneau	Mauston	41.5	66.8	US 12 / WIS 16 – New Lisbon, Lyndon Station	
Juneau	Mauston	41.7	67.1	WIS 82 east – Oxford	Northern end of WIS 82 concurrency; access to I-90/I-94
Juneau	Clearfield–Germantown town line	53.6	86.3	WIS 80 – New Lisbon, Necedah	
1.000 mi = 1.609 km; 1.000 km = 0.621 mi: Concurrency terminus
