= John Kaney =

American politician (1869–1935)

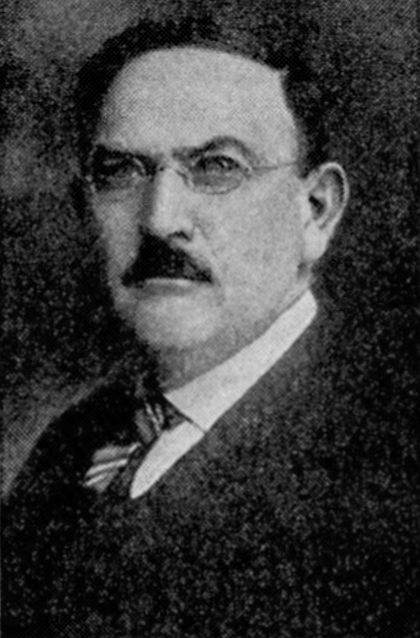

Member of the Wisconsin State Assembly
- In office 1919

Personal details
- Born: December 5, 1869 Sandusky, Wisconsin, US
- Died: December 20, 1935 (aged 66) Milwaukee, Wisconsin, US
- Party: Republican
- Education: Marquette University Law School
- Occupation: Lawyer, politician

John S. Kaney (December 5, 1869 – December 20, 1935) was a member of the Wisconsin State Assembly.

== Biography ==
John Kaney was born in Sandusky, Wisconsin on December 5, 1869. He graduated from high school in Sextonville, Wisconsin before graduating from what was then the Wisconsin State College of Milwaukee and the Marquette University Law School.

He died at his home in Milwaukee on December 20, 1935.

== Career ==
Kaney was elected to the Assembly in 1918. Previously, he was City Attorney of Milwaukee, Wisconsin from 1906 to 1910 and a Milwaukee alderman from 1912 to 1916. He was a Republican.
