= Rock Springs, Wisconsin =

- Village
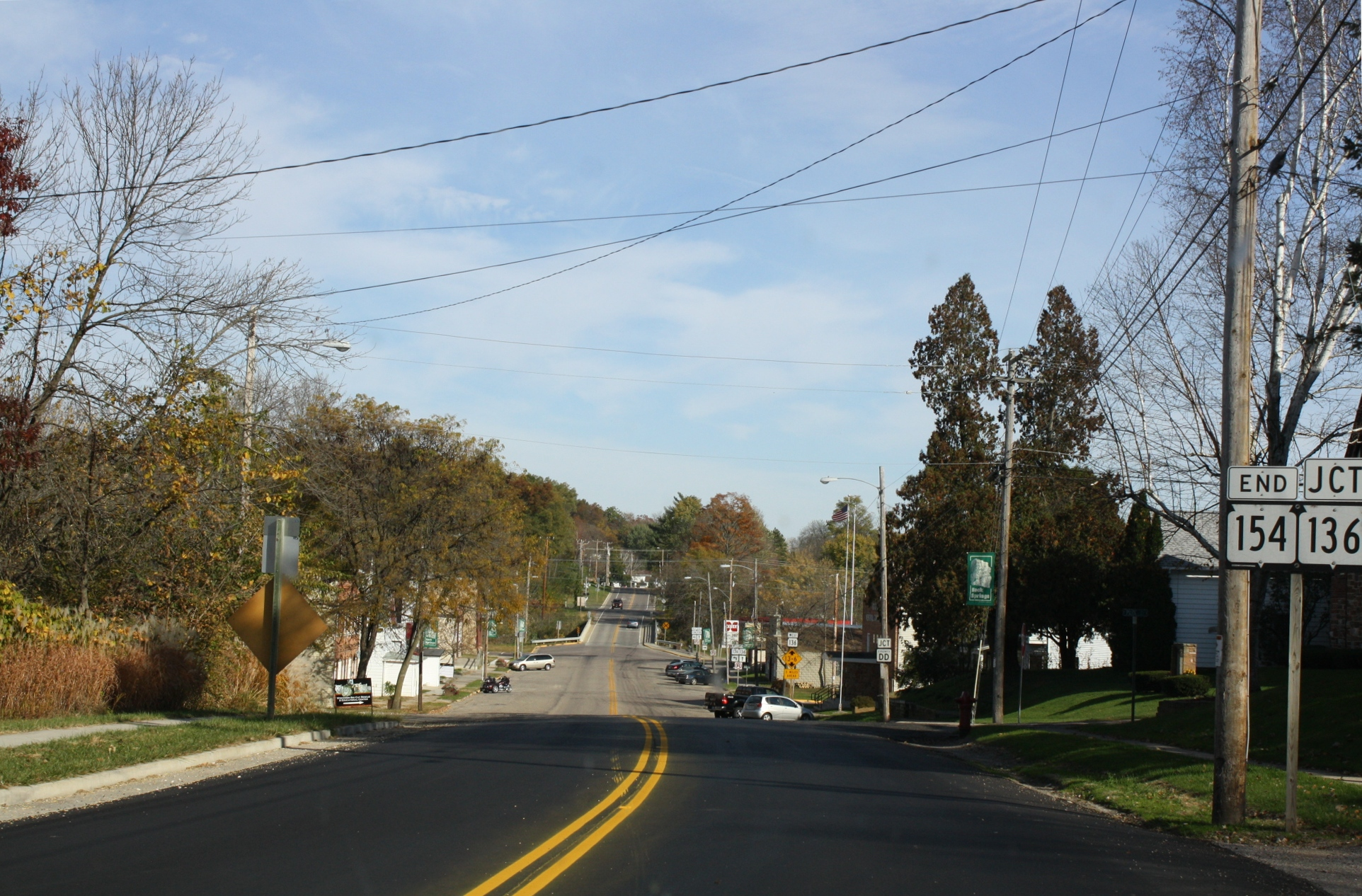
- Looking east in Rock Springs

- Location of Rock Springs in Sauk County, Wisconsin.
- Coordinates: 43°28′40″N 89°55′1″W
- Country: United States
- State: Wisconsin
- County: Sauk

Area
  - Total: 1.33 sq mi (3.45 km^{2})
  - Land: 1.30 sq mi (3.37 km^{2})
  - Water: 0.035 sq mi (0.09 km^{2})
- Elevation: 974 ft (297 m)

Population (2020)
  - Total: 327
  - Density: 251/sq mi (97.0/km^{2})
- Time zone: UTC-6 (Central (CST))
  - Summer (DST): UTC-5 (CDT)
- Area code: 608
- FIPS code: 55-68975
- GNIS feature ID: 1572475
- Website: rockspringswi.gov

Rock Springs is a village in Sauk County, Wisconsin, United States, along the Baraboo River. The population was 327 at the 2020 census.

== History ==
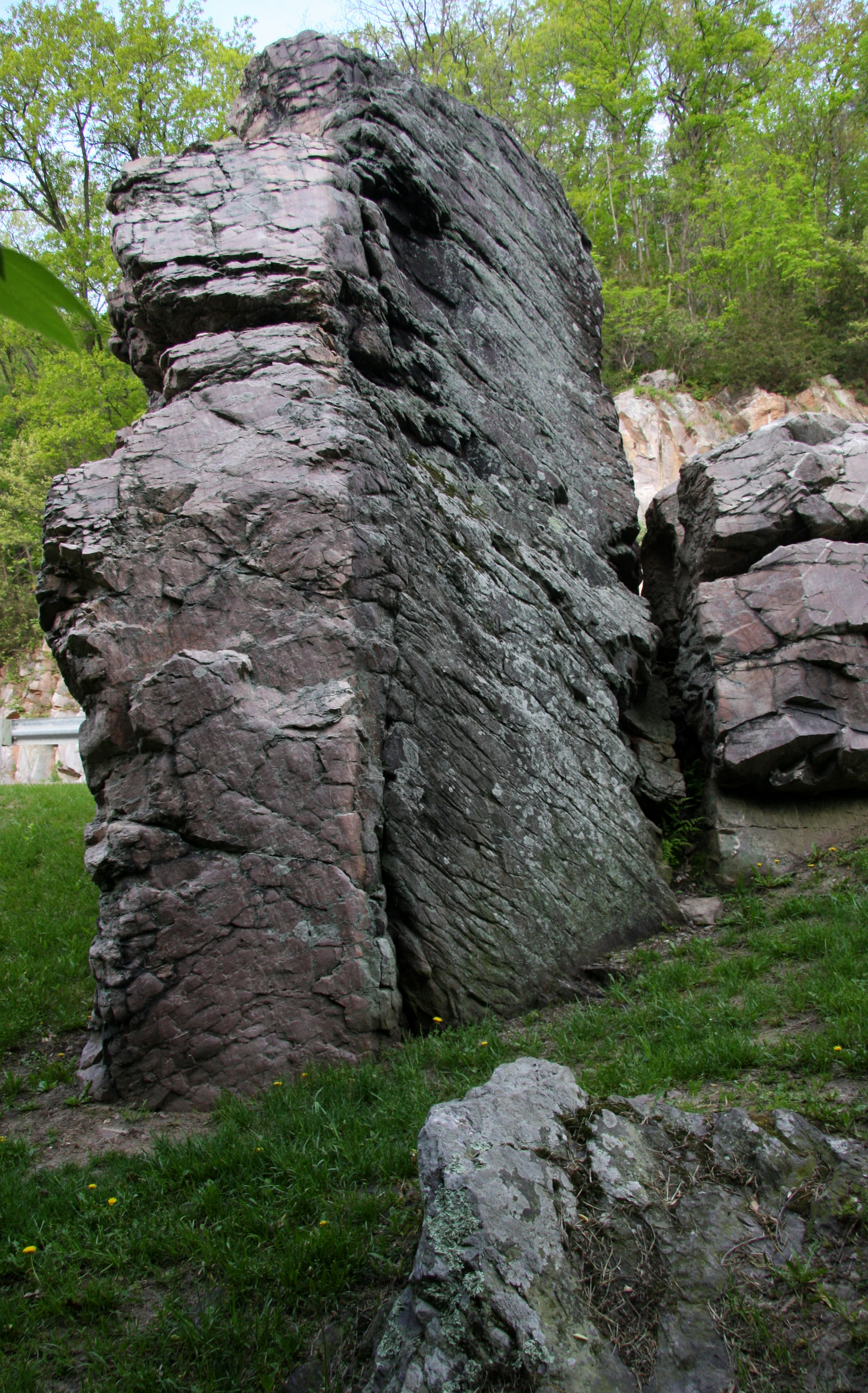
Van Hise Rock

At the time of its founding, Rock Springs was known as Ableman, after Stephen Van Rensselaer Ableman, who settled there in 1851. The railroad has been a major influence on the village's growth.

Surrounded by cliffs of Baraboo Quartzite, the village is two miles south of a notable rock formation located in Ableman Gorge, Van Hise Rock, which was used to explain the processes of structural geology by University of Wisconsin–Madison professor Charles R. Van Hise.

== Geography ==
Rock Springs is located at 43°28′40″N 89°55′1″W (43.477698, −89.917030).

According to the United States Census Bureau, the village has a total area of 1.35 square miles (3.50 km^{2}), of which 1.32 square miles (3.42 km^{2}) is land and 0.03 square miles (0.08 km^{2}) is water.

== Demographics ==
Historical population
| Census | Pop. | Note | %± |
|---|---|---|---|
| 1880 | 163 | | — |
| 1890 | 332 | | 103.7% |
| 1900 | 430 | | 29.5% |
| 1910 | 444 | | 3.3% |
| 1920 | 542 | | 22.1% |
| 1930 | 470 | | −13.3% |
| 1940 | 395 | | −16.0% |
| 1950 | 442 | | 11.9% |
| 1960 | 463 | | 4.8% |
| 1970 | 432 | | −6.7% |
| 1980 | 426 | | −1.4% |
| 1990 | 432 | | 1.4% |
| 2000 | 425 | | −1.6% |
| 2010 | 362 | | −14.8% |
| 2020 | 327 | | −9.7% |
U.S. Decennial Census

=== 2010 census ===
As of the census of 2010, there were 362 people, 137 households, and 99 families living in the village. The population density was 274.2 inhabitants per square mile (105.9/km^{2}). There were 150 housing units at an average density of 113.6 per square mile (43.9/km^{2}). The racial makeup of the village was 96.4% White, 1.1% Native American, and 2.5% from two or more races. Hispanic or Latino of any race were 0.8% of the population.

There were 137 households, of which 35.8% had children under the age of 18 living with them, 49.6% were married couples living together, 12.4% had a female householder with no husband present, 10.2% had a male householder with no wife present, and 27.7% were non-families. 16.1% of all households were made up of individuals, and 4.3% had someone living alone who was 65 years of age or older. The average household size was 2.64 and the average family size was 2.96.

The median age in the village was 37.2 years. 26.5% of residents were under the age of 18; 7.7% were between the ages of 18 and 24; 27.4% were from 25 to 44; 26.8% were from 45 to 64; and 11.6% were 65 years of age or older. The gender makeup of the village was 49.2% male and 50.8% female.

=== 2000 census ===
As of the census of 2000, there were 425 people, 156 households, and 117 families living in the village. The population density was 315.9 people per square mile (121.6/km^{2}). There were 167 housing units at an average density of 124.1 per square mile (47.8/km^{2}). The racial makeup of the village was 99.29% White, 0.24% African American and 0.47% Native American. Hispanic or Latino of any race were 1.18% of the population.

There were 156 households, out of which 38.5% had children under the age of 18 living with them, 62.2% were married couples living together, 4.5% had a female householder with no husband present, and 25.0% were non-families. 20.5% of all households were made up of individuals, and 12.8% had someone living alone who was 65 years of age or older. The average household size was 2.72 and the average family size was 3.14.

In the village, the population was spread out, with 26.1% under the age of 18, 9.2% from 18 to 24, 30.8% from 25 to 44, 20.5% from 45 to 64, and 13.4% who were 65 years of age or older. The median age was 36 years. For every 100 females, there were 97.7 males. For every 100 females age 18 and over, there were 97.5 males.

The median income for a household in the village was $41,500, and the median income for a family was $51,071. Males had a median income of $31,932 versus $21,125 for females. The per capita income for the village was $17,689. About 6.0% of families and 10.1% of the population were below the poverty line, including 8.2% of those under age 18 and 10.0% of those age 65 or over.

== Notable person ==
- Nancy Lange – First Lady of Peru (2016-2018); born in Rock Springs.

== Images ==
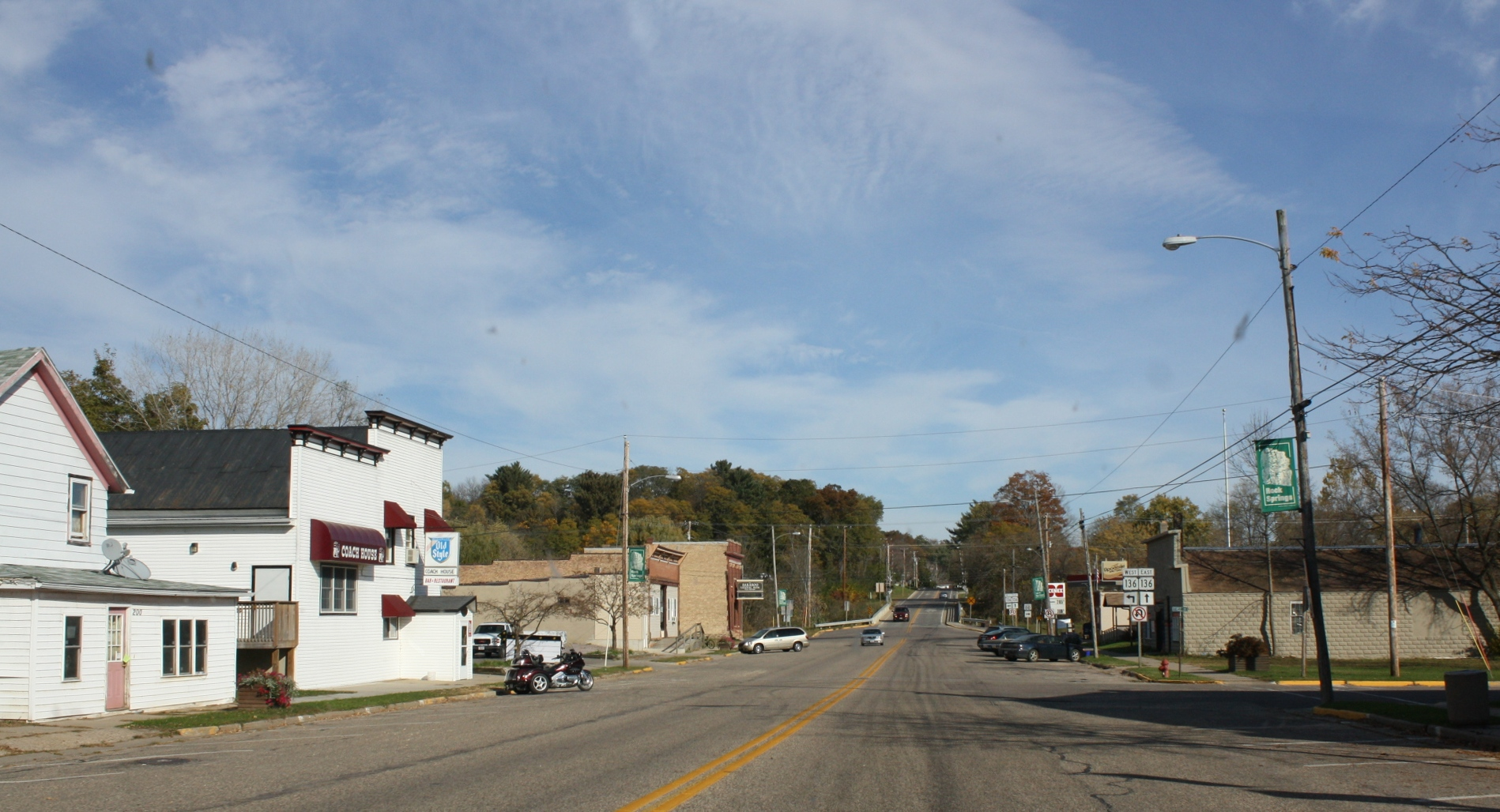
Downtown Rock Springs

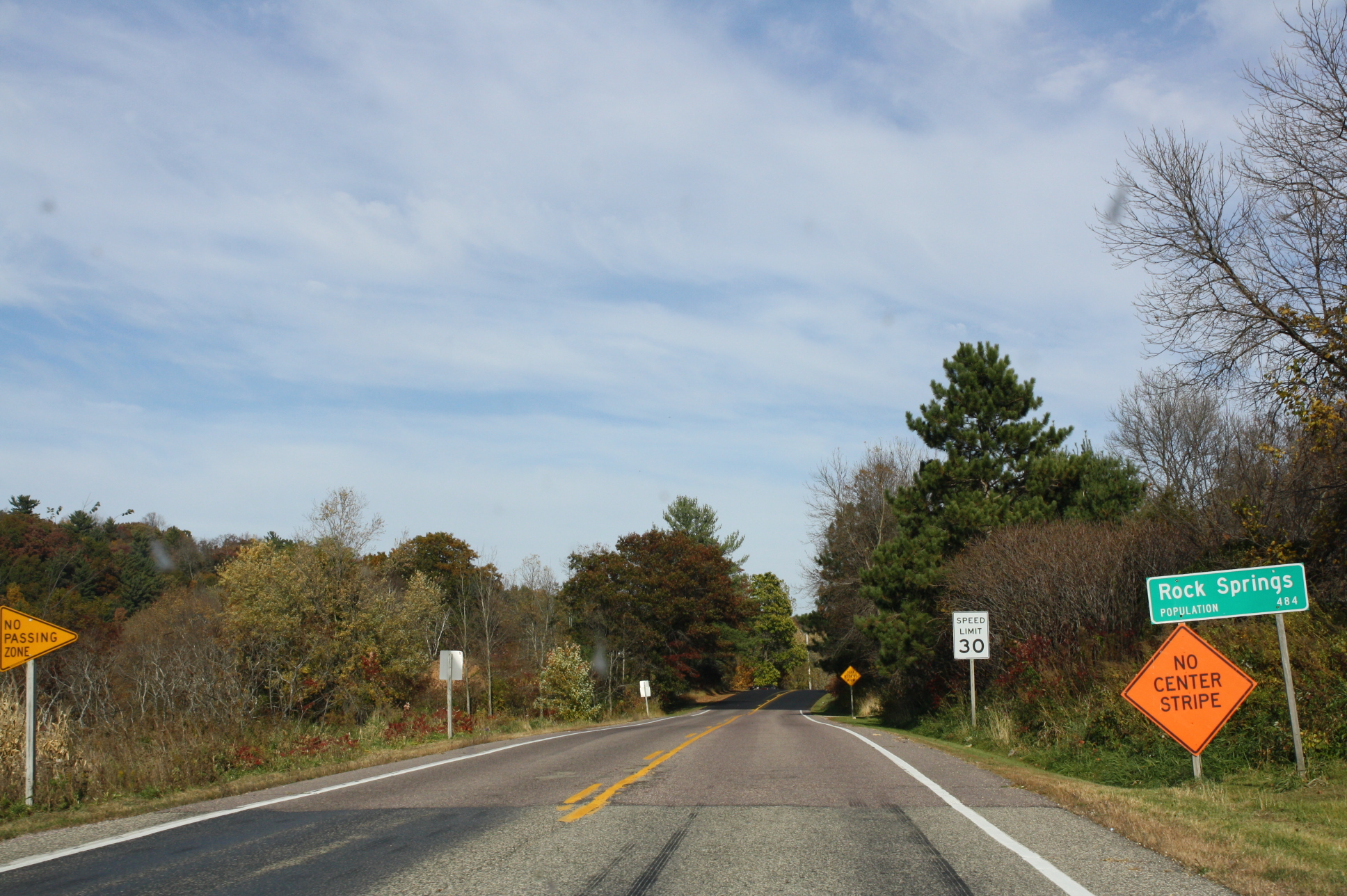
Sign on WIS 154

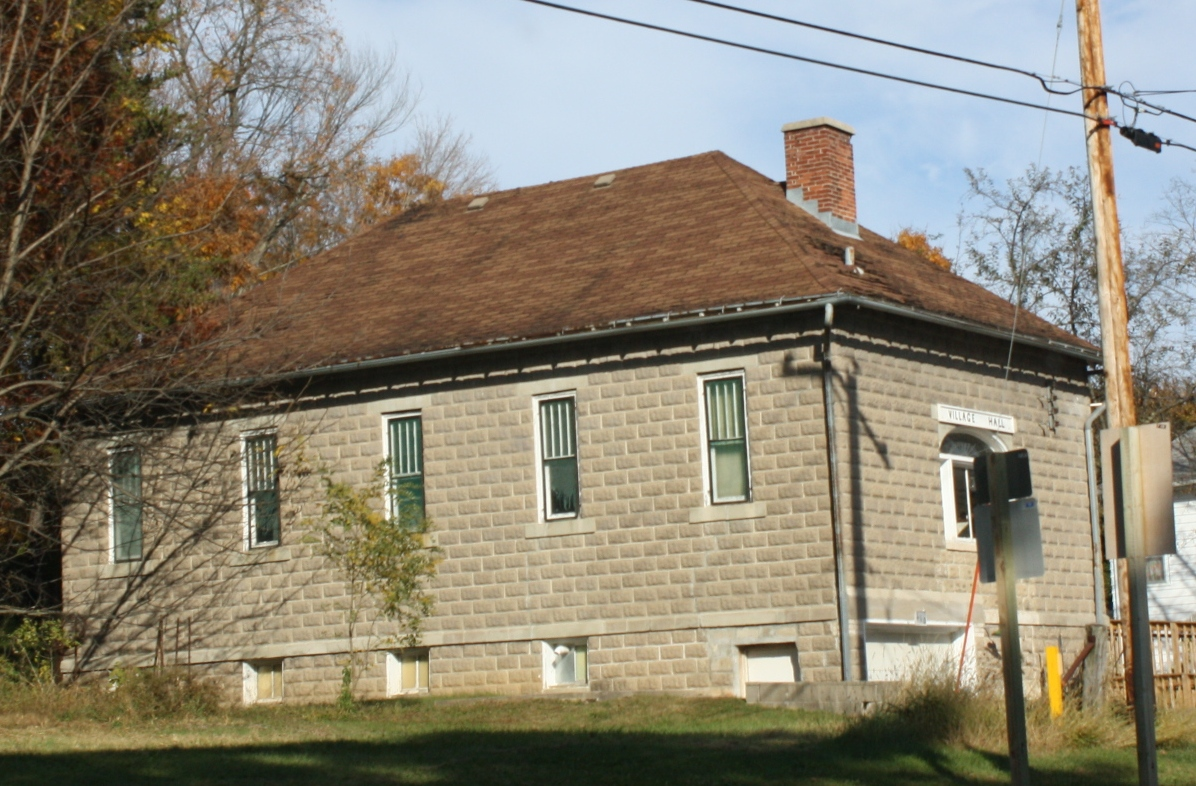
Village hall

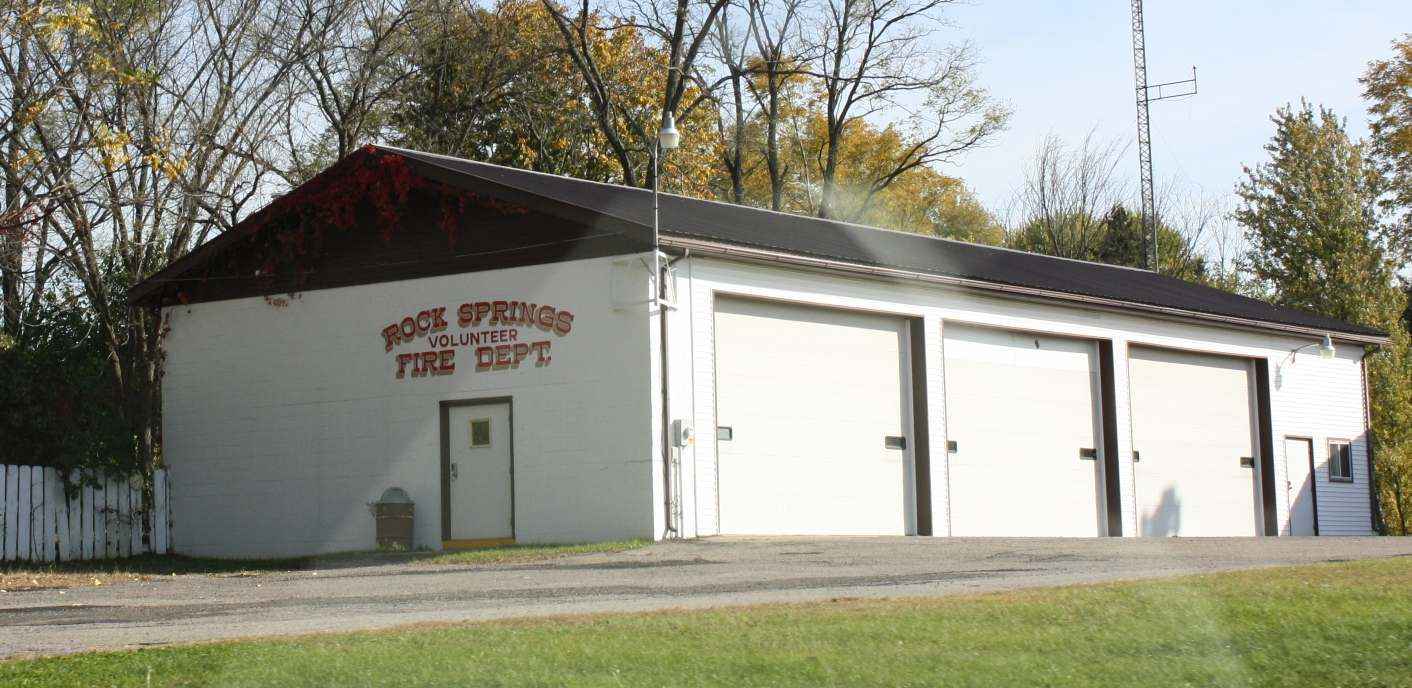
Fire station

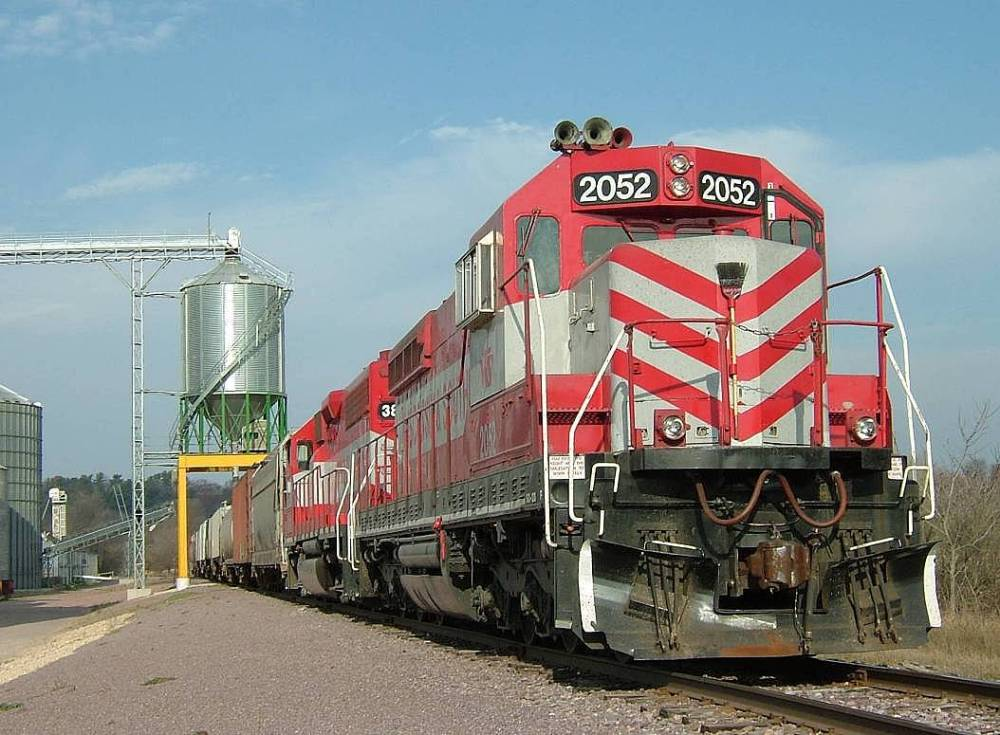
A diesel train loads up with grain at Rock Springs
