= Fairfield, Wisconsin =

Town of Fairfield
- Town
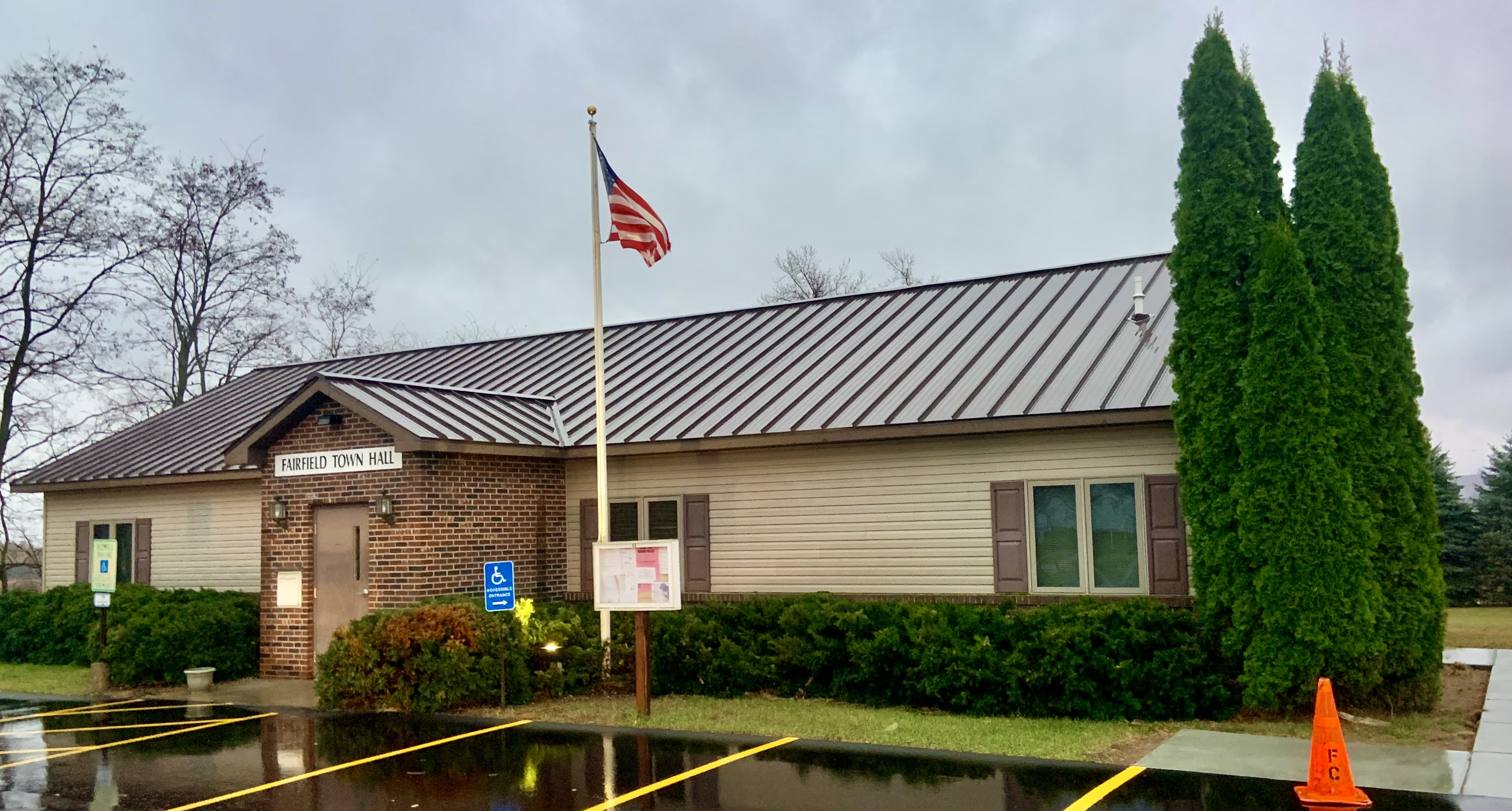
- Town hall

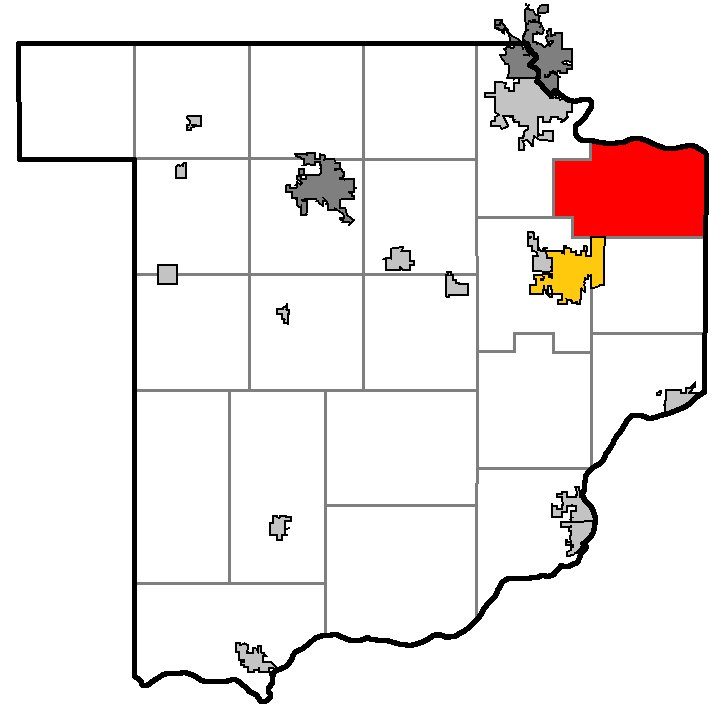
- Location of the Town of Fairfield, within Sauk County, Wisconsin

- Location of Sauk County, Wisconsin
- Coordinates: 43°32′36″N 89°40′25″W
- Country: United States
- State: Wisconsin
- County: Sauk

Area
  - Total: 35.6 sq mi (92.2 km^{2})
  - Land: 35.0 sq mi (90.6 km^{2})
  - Water: 0.62 sq mi (1.6 km^{2})
- Elevation: 820 ft (250 m)

Population (2020)
  - Total: 1,078
  - Density: 30.8/sq mi (11.9/km^{2})
- Time zone: UTC-6 (Central (CST))
  - Summer (DST): UTC-5 (CDT)
- Area code: 608
- FIPS code: 55-24900
- GNIS feature ID: 1583186
- Website: https://townoffairfieldwi.gov/

The Town of Fairfield is located in Sauk County, Wisconsin, United States. The population was 1,078 at the 2020 census. The unincorporated community of Greens Corners is located in the town.

== History ==
The town is the location of the "sand farm" (Aldo Leopold Shack and Farm) purchased by Aldo Leopold in 1935. A family retreat from the city of Madison, Leopold's attempts to restore health to this abandoned farm, with the help of family and friends, became the inspiration for his masterpiece, "A Sand County Almanac." Leopold died near 'the Shack' while fighting a neighbor's grass fire in 1948.

== Geography ==
According to the United States Census Bureau, the town has a total area of 35.6 square miles (92.2 km^{2}), of which 35.0 square miles (90.6 km^{2}) is land and 0.6 square mile (1.6 km^{2}) (1.74%) is water.

== Demographics ==
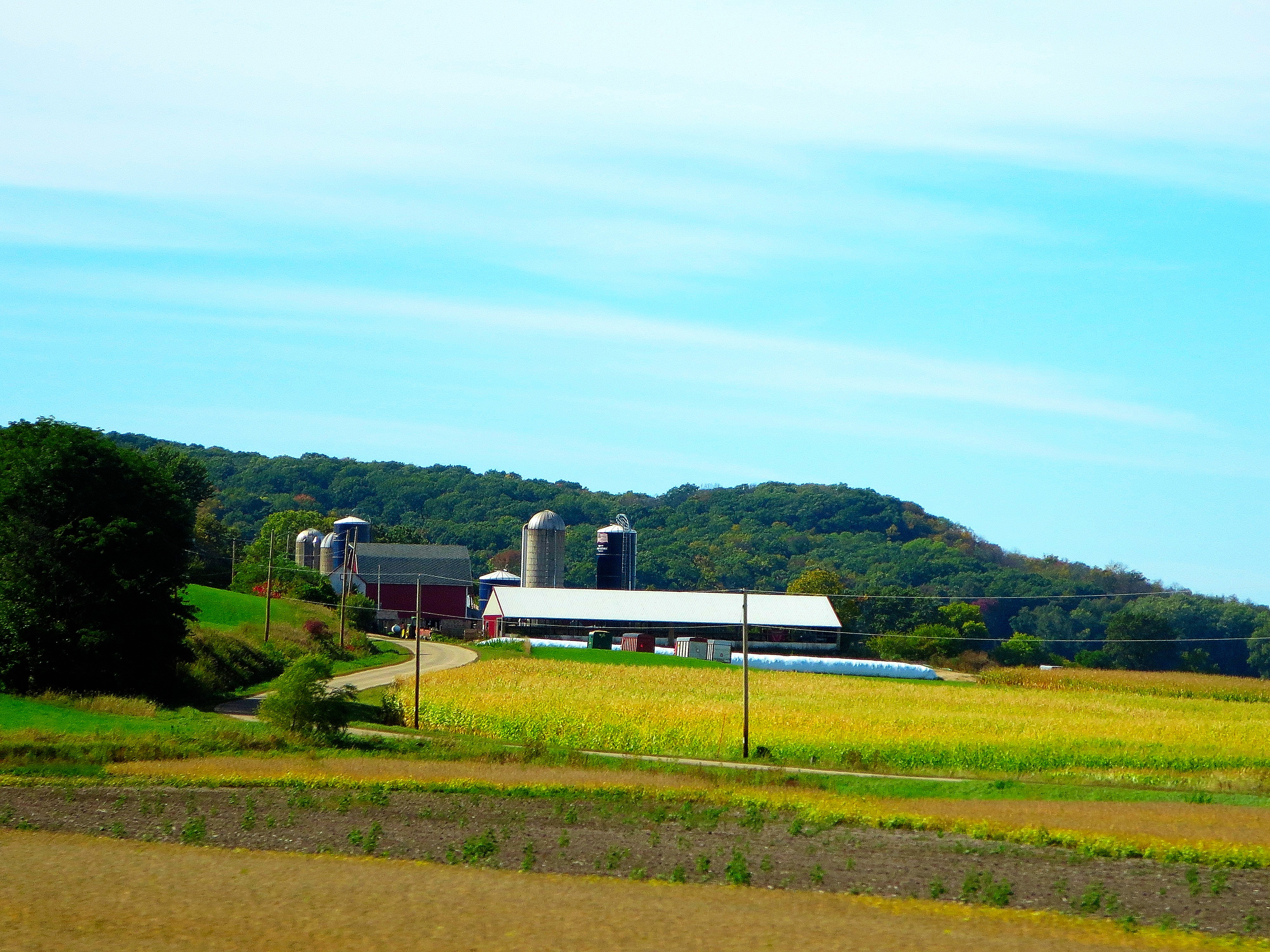
Dairy Farm in the Town of Fairfield, September 2013

As of the census of 2000, there were 1,023 people, 388 households, and 301 families residing in the town. The population density was 29.3 people per square mile (11.3/km^{2}). There were 420 housing units at an average density of 12.0 per square mile (4.6/km^{2}). The racial makeup of the town was 97.36% White, 0.29% African American, 0.59% Native American, 0.29% Asian, 0.49% from other races, and 0.98% from two or more races. Hispanic or Latino of any race were 1.37% of the population.

There were 388 households, out of which 34.0% had children under the age of 18 living with them, 68.8% were married couples living together, 5.2% had a female householder with no husband present, and 22.4% were non-families. 18.8% of all households were made up of individuals, and 5.2% had someone living alone who was 65 years of age or older. The average household size was 2.64 and the average family size was 3.02.

The population 25.5% under the age of 18, 4.9% from 18 to 24, 29.5% from 25 to 44, 29.0% from 45 to 64, and 11.0% who were 65 years of age or older. The median age was 39 years. For every 100 females, there were 107.5 males. For every 100 females age 18 and over, there were 106.5 males.

The median income for a household in the town was $50,625, and the median income for a family was $56,389. Males had a median income of $37,647 versus $21,833 for females. The per capita income for the town was $22,155. About 1.3% of families and 2.0% of the population were below the poverty line, including 2.1% of those under age 18 and 3.1% of those age 65 or over.
