= Loddes Mill, Wisconsin =

- Unincorporated community
- Location within Wisconsin Location within the United States
- Coordinates: 43°15′50″N 89°48′02″W
- Country: United States
- State: Wisconsin
- County: Sauk
- Elevation: 741 ft (226 m)
- Time zone: UTC-6 (Central (CST))
  - Summer (DST): UTC-5 (CDT)
- Area code: 608
- GNIS feature ID: 1581158

Loddes Mill is an unincorporated community in the Town of Prairie du Sac, Sauk County, Wisconsin, United States.

== History ==
Before 1877, it was known as Sauk City Mills. It was the site of a now discontinued post office.

The site of the first dam in Sauk County, Loddes Mill was built on lower Honey Creek in 1841 by Robert Bryant for a saw mill. Henry B. Staines was involved with making the Dam. They used soil from the Sauk City Mounds which was made of a light colored clay which was different from the surrounding sand. He later sold it to H.B. Staines, who installed a pair of 28-inch burr stones and a shaking belt. Staines sold later to Mix, who constructed a building with a pair of 30-inch burr stones. Wilson was the next proprietor, then J. R. Woodruff, and then the mill was sold to Henry Rowell.

The last mill, which is no longer standing, was built as a flour mill by Henry Rowell, and thus named Rowell's Mill. Rowell later partnered with Rufus Merrihew as Merrihew, Rowell & Co. It was a limestone building of 32 by 50 feet, and had four run of stone, along with a shed for feeding teams. In 1859, the flour from the mill took first place at the state fair. The mill was again sold in 1877 to Martin Lodde, who built a large frame building with three turbine wheels. The dam was purchased by Wisconsin Power and Light in 1932 and the frame mill was razed. The mill pond dam broke in the evening of August 6, 1935 in a county-wide cloudburst and was never rebuilt.
