= Hill Point, Wisconsin =

- Unincorporated community
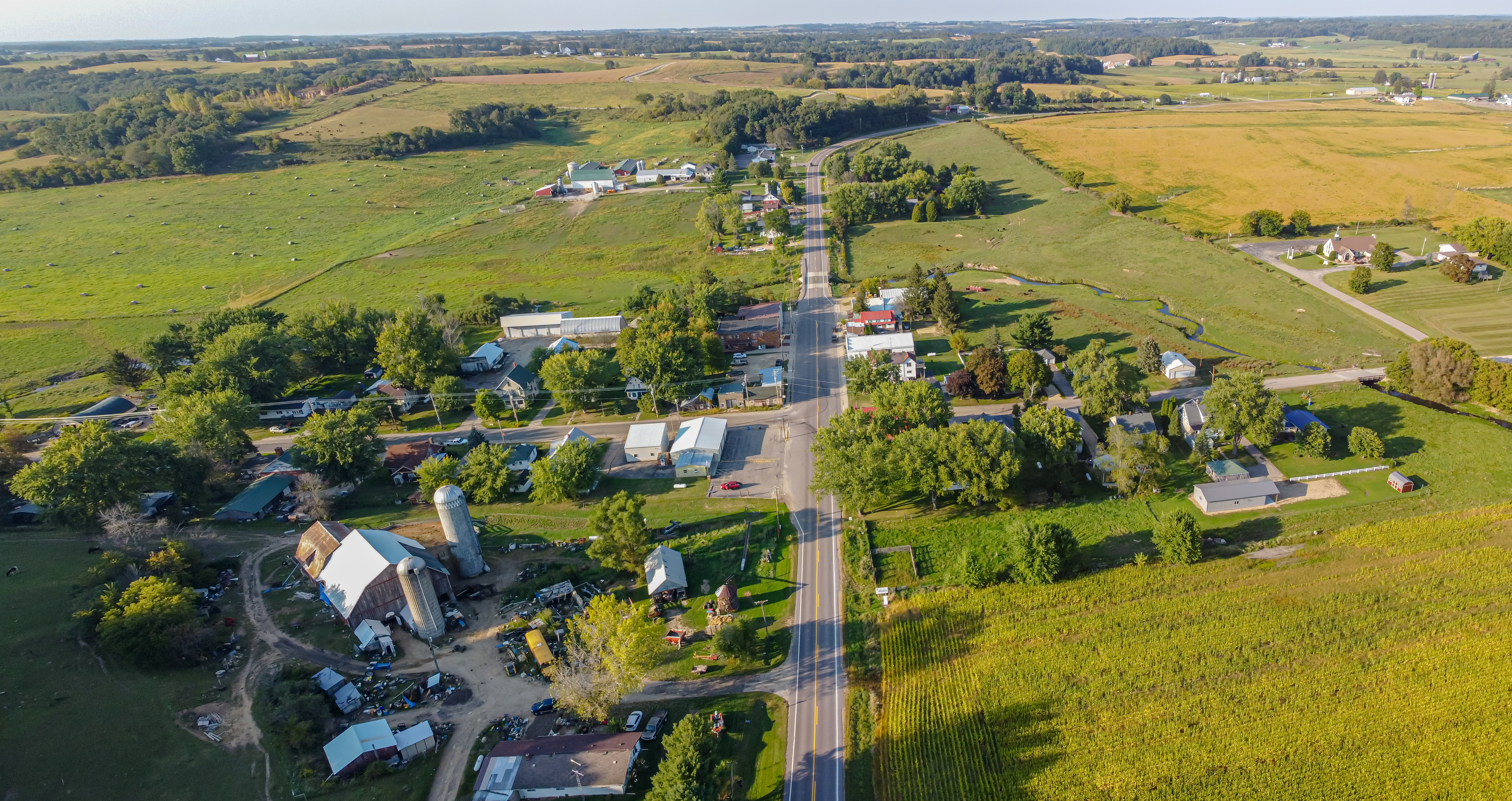

- Location within Wisconsin Location within the United States
- Coordinates: 43°25′28″N 90°06′45″W
- Country: United States
- State: Wisconsin
- County: Sauk
- Elevation: 991 ft (302 m)
- Time zone: UTC-6 (Central (CST))
  - Summer (DST): UTC-5 (CDT)
- ZIP code: 53937
- Area code: 608
- GNIS feature ID: 1578567

Hill Point, also known as Hillpoint, is an unincorporated community in Sauk County, Wisconsin, United States.

== Description ==
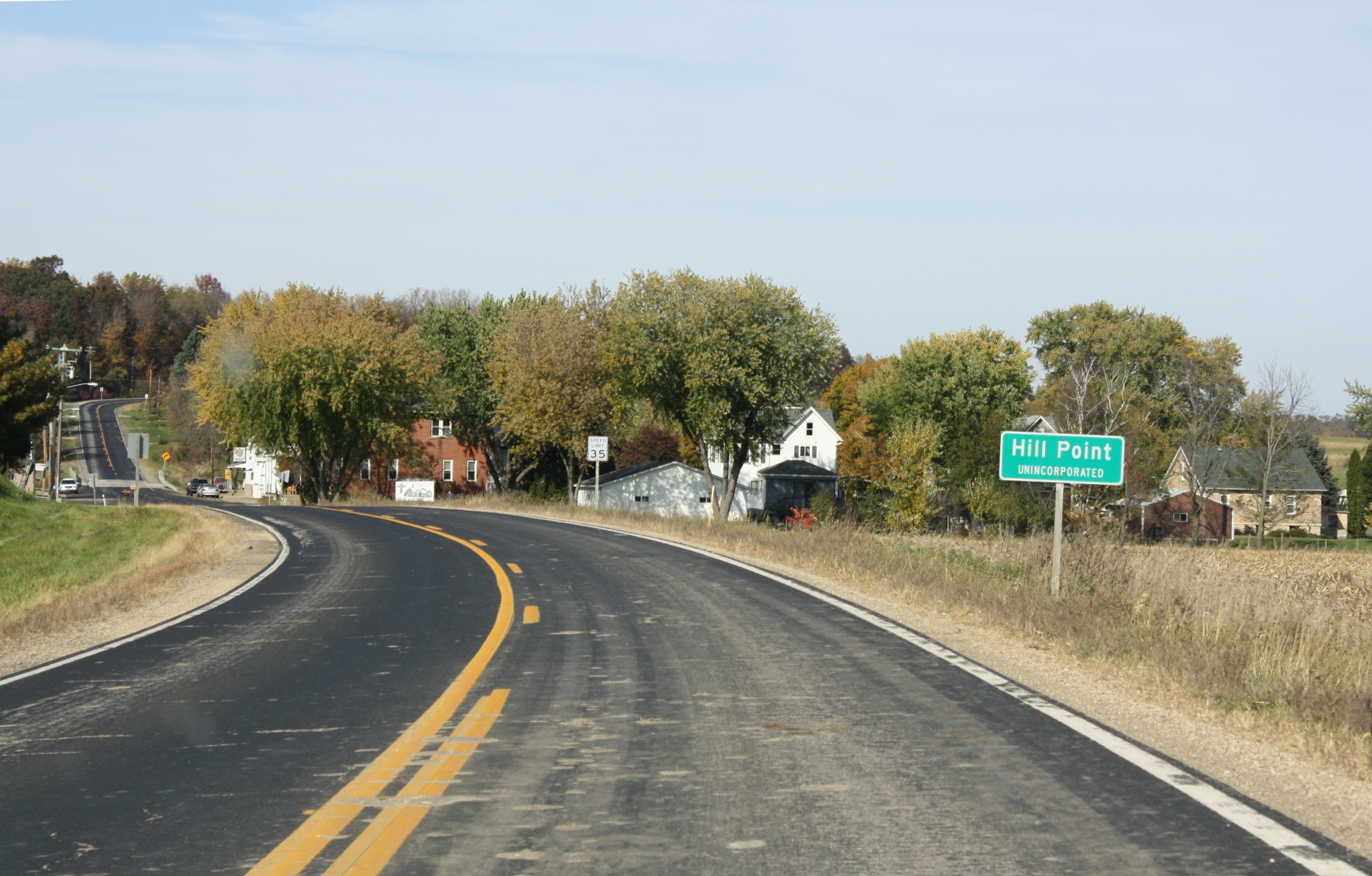
Sign for Hill Point along Wisconsin Highway 154, October 2010

Hill Point is located on Wisconsin Highway 154 west of Loganville, in the town of Washington. Hill Point has a post office with ZIP code 53937. The community was formerly known as Tuckerville, after one William Tucker.
