= Sandusky, Wisconsin =

- Unincorporated community
- Location within Wisconsin Location within the United States
- Coordinates: 43°23′43″N 90°09′07″W
- Country: United States
- State: Wisconsin
- County: Sauk
- Elevation: 1,175 ft (358 m)
- Time zone: UTC-6 (Central (CST))
  - Summer (DST): UTC-5 (CDT)
- Area code: 608
- GNIS feature ID: 1577812

Sandusky is an unincorporated community located in the town of Washington, Sauk County, Wisconsin, United States.

The community was named after Sandusky, Ohio, the native home of an early settler.
