= Prairie du Sac (town), Wisconsin =

Prairie du Sac, Wisconsin
- Town
- Town of Prairie du Sac
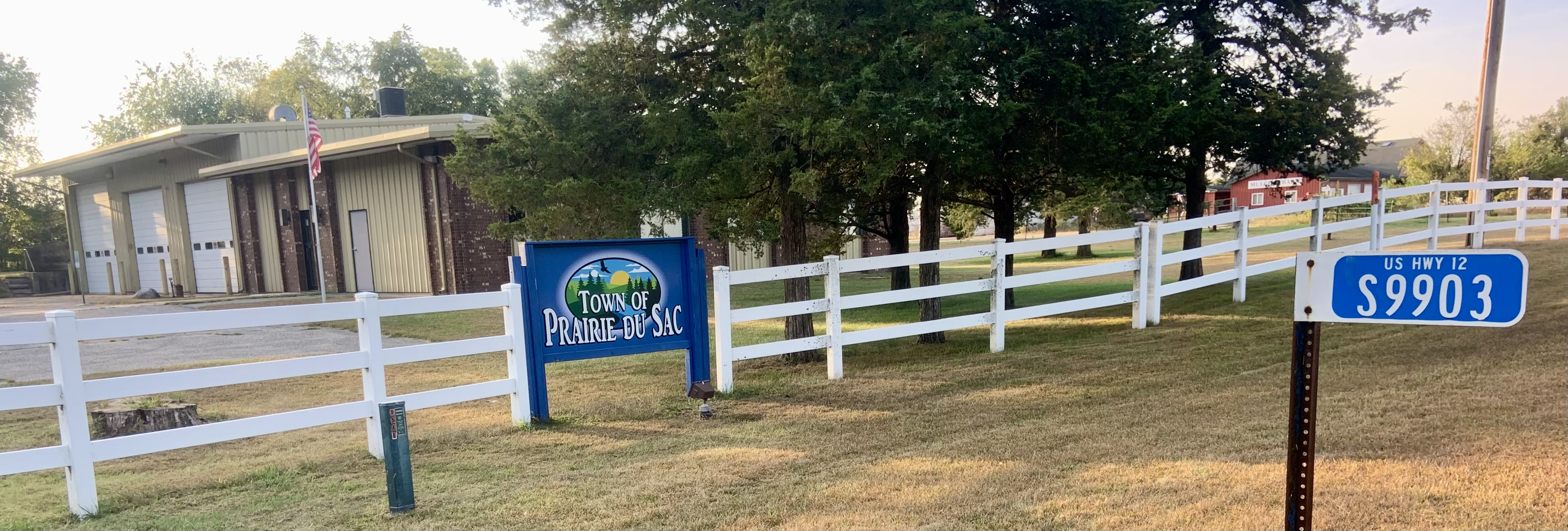
- Prairie Du Sac Town Hall

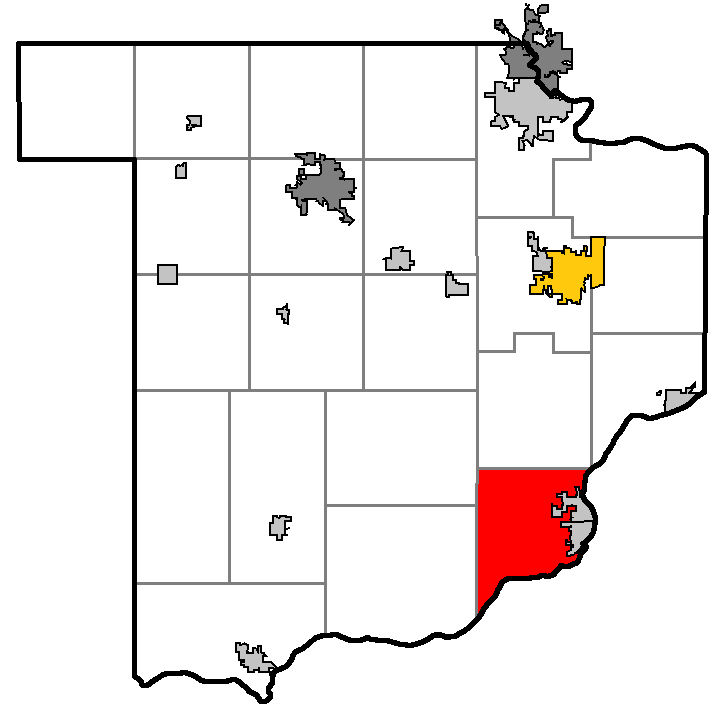
- Location of Prairie du Sac, Sauk County, Wisconsin

- Location of Sauk County, Wisconsin
- Coordinates: 43°17′03″N 89°47′53″W
- Country: United States
- State: Wisconsin
- County: Sauk

Area
  - Total: 30.14 sq mi (78.1 km^{2})
  - Land: 28.86 sq mi (74.7 km^{2})
  - Water: 1.28 sq mi (3.3 km^{2})

Population (2020)
  - Total: 1,076
  - Density: 37.28/sq mi (14.40/km^{2})
- Time zone: UTC-6 (Central (CST))
  - Summer (DST): UTC-5 (CDT)
- Area code(s): 608 and 353
- GNIS feature ID: 1583974

The Town of Prairie du Sac is located in southwestern Sauk County, Wisconsin, United States. The population was 1,076 at the 2020 census. The Village of Prairie du Sac is located within the town. The unincorporated community of Loddes Mill is also located in the town.

== Geography ==
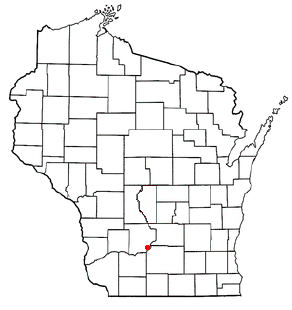
Location of Prairie du Sac (town), Wisconsin

According to the United States Census Bureau, the town has a total area of 30.4 square miles (78.6 km^{2}), of which 29.5 square miles (76.4 km^{2}) is land and 0.9 square mile (2.2 km^{2}) (2.83%) is water.

== Demographics ==
As of the census of 2000, there were 3,231 people, 415 households, and 337 families residing in the town. The population density was 38.6 people per square mile (14.9/km^{2}). There were 428 housing units at an average density of 14.5 per square mile (5.6/km^{2}). The racial makeup of the town was 97.89% White, 0.09% Black or African American, 0.88% Asian, and 1.14% from two or more races. 0.18% of the population were Hispanic or Latino of any race.

There were 415 households, out of which 36.1% had children under the age of 18 living with them, 73.5% were married couples living together, 4.8% had a female householder with no husband present, and 18.6% were non-families. 15.2% of all households were made up of individuals, and 5.1% had someone living alone who was 65 years of age or older. The average household size was 2.74 and the average family size was 3.07.

In the town, the population was spread out, with 26.4% under the age of 18, 5.0% from 18 to 24, 30.8% from 25 to 44, 27.6% from 45 to 64, and 10.2% who were 65 years of age or older. The median age was 35 years. For every 100 females, there were 106.9 males. For every 100 females age 18 and over, there were 107.4 males.

The median income for a household in the town was $56,667, and the median income for a family was $59,875. Males had a median income of $36,974 versus $25,625 for females. The per capita income for the town was $22,709. About 3.6% of families and 5.5% of the population were below the poverty line, including 6.4% of those under age 18 and 13.8% of those age 65 or over.
