= Sauk County, Wisconsin =

County in Wisconsin, United States

- County
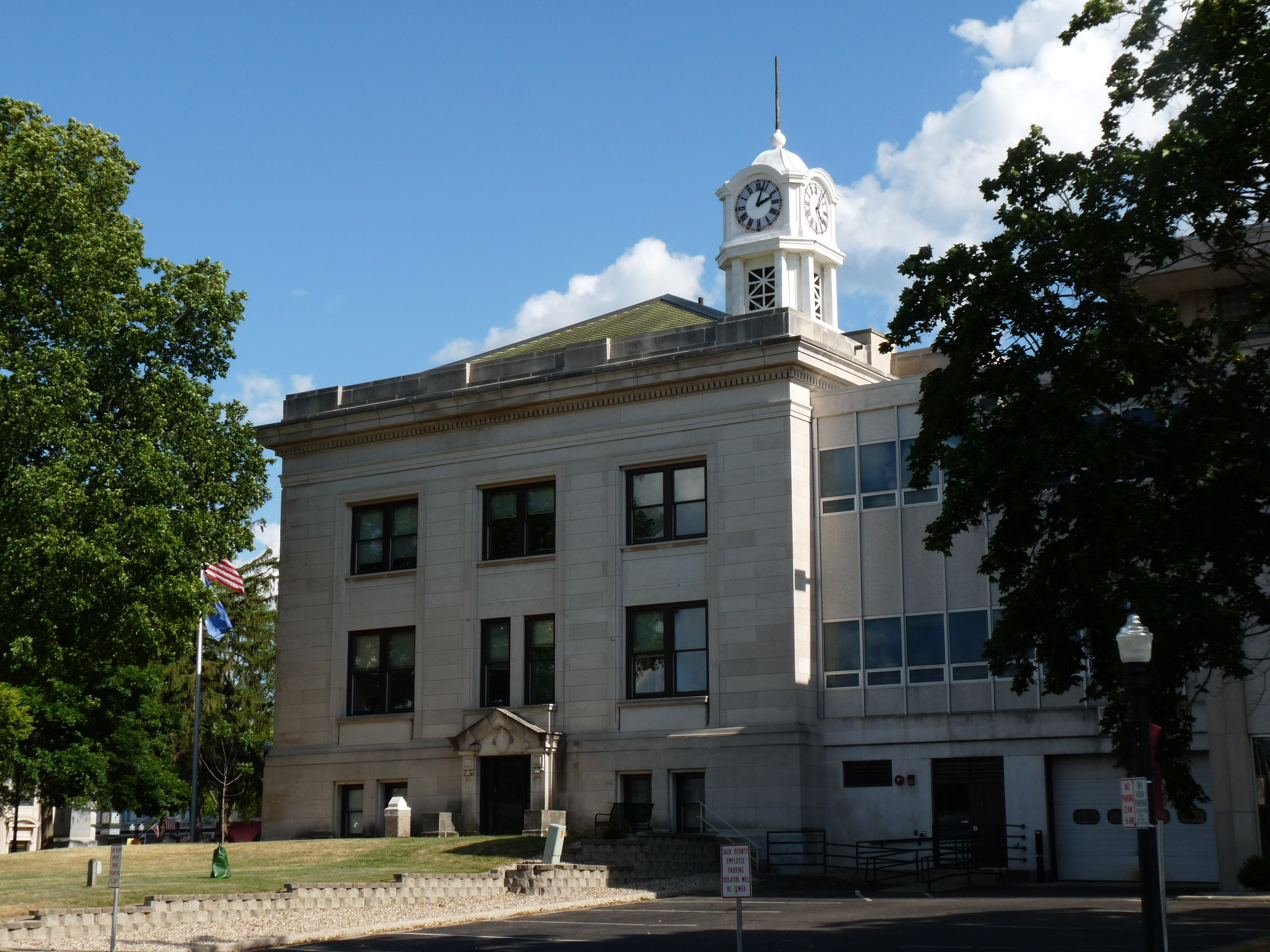
- Sauk County Courthouse in June 2012

- Location within the U.S. state of Wisconsin
- Coordinates: 43°26′N 89°56′W
- Country: United States
- State: Wisconsin
- Founded: 1844
- Named for: Sauk people
- Seat: Baraboo
- Largest city: Baraboo

Area
  - Total: 849 sq mi (2,200 km^{2})
  - Land: 831 sq mi (2,150 km^{2})
  - Water: 18 sq mi (47 km^{2}) 2.1%

Population (2020)
  - Total: 65,763
  - Estimate (2025): 66,652 ▲
  - Density: 80/sq mi (31/km^{2})
- Time zone: UTC−6 (Central)
  - Summer (DST): UTC−5 (CDT)
- Congressional districts: 2nd, 3rd
- Website: www.co.sauk.wi.us

Sauk County is a county in Wisconsin. It is named after a large village of the Sauk people. As of the 2020 census, the population was 65,763. Its county seat and largest city is Baraboo. The county was created in 1840 from Wisconsin Territory and organized in 1844. Sauk County comprises the Baraboo, WI Micropolitan Statistical Area and is included in the Greater Madison area.

== History ==
Sauk County was a New England settlement. The original founders of Sauk County consisted entirely of settlers from New England as well as some from upstate New York who had parents who moved to that region from New England shortly after the American Revolution. These people were "Yankee" settlers, that is to say they were descended from the English Puritans who settled New England in the 1600s. While most of them came to Wisconsin directly from New England, there were many who came from upstate New York. They were part of a wave of New England farmers who headed west into what was then the wilds of the Northwest Territory during the early 1800s. In the case of Wisconsin this migration primarily occurred in the 1830s. Due to the prevalence of New Englanders and New England transplants from upstate New York, Wisconsin was very culturally continuous with early New England culture for much of its early history.

The Yankee migration to Wisconsin in the 1830s was a result of several factors, one of which was the overpopulation of New England. The old stock Yankee population had large families, often bearing up to ten children in one household. Most people were expected to have their own piece of land to farm, and due to the massive and nonstop population boom, land in New England became scarce as every son claimed his own farmstead. As a result, there was not enough land for every family to have a self-sustaining farm, and Yankee settlers began leaving New England for the Midwestern United States.

They were aided in this effort by the construction and completion of the Erie Canal which made traveling to the region much easier, causing an additional surge in migrants coming from New England. Added to this was the end of the Black Hawk War, which made the region much safer to travel through and settle in for white settlers.

They got to what is now Sauk County in the 1830s by sailing up the Wisconsin River from the Mississippi River on small barges which they constructed themselves out of materials obtained from the surrounding woodlands. When they arrived in what is now Sauk County there was nothing but dense virgin forest, the "Yankee" New Englanders laid out farms, constructed roads, erected government buildings and established post routes. They brought with them many of their Yankee New England values, such as a passion for education, establishing many schools as well as staunch support for abolitionism. They were mostly members of the Congregationalist Church though some were Episcopalian. Due to the second Great Awakening some of them had converted to Methodism and some became Baptist before moving to what is now Sauk County. Sauk County, like much of Wisconsin, would be culturally very continuous with early New England culture for most of its early history.

In the late 1890s, German immigrants began to settle in Sauk County, making up less than one out of thirty settlers in the county before this date. Generally there was little conflict between them and the "Yankee" settlers, however when conflict did arise it focused around the issue of prohibition of alcohol. On this issue the Yankees were divided and the Germans almost unanimously were opposed to it, tipping the balance in favor of opposition to prohibition. Later the two communities would be divided on the issue of World War I in which, once again, the Yankee community would be divided and the Germans were unanimously opposed to American entry into the war. The Yankee community was generally pro-British, however many of the Yankees also did not want America to enter the war themselves. The Germans were sympathetic to Germany and did not want the United States to enter into a war against Germany, but the Germans were not anti-British. Prior to World War I, many German community leaders in Wisconsin spoke openly and enthusiastically about how much better America was than Germany, due primarily (in their eyes) to the presence of English law and the English political culture the Americans had inherited from the colonial era, which they contrasted with the turmoil and oppression in Germany which they had so recently fled. In the early 1900s immigrants from Ireland, Sweden, Norway and Poland also arrived in Sauk County. The area around Baraboo was first settled by Abe Wood in 1838, and was originally known as the village of Adams. In 1846 it became the county seat of Sauk County after a fierce fight with the nearby village of Reedsburg. In 1852, the village was renamed "Baraboo", after the nearby river. It was incorporated as a city in 1882.

New England settlers set up several sawmills early in the history of what is now Baraboo because of its location near the Baraboo and Wisconsin Rivers.

The city was the home of the Ringling brothers. From 1884 to 1917 it was the headquarters of their circus and several others, leading to the nickname "Circus City". Today Circus World Museum is located in Baraboo. A living history museum, it has a collection of circus wagons and other circus artifacts. It also has the largest library of circus information in the United States. The museum previously hosted the Great Circus Parade, which carried circus wagons and performers through the streets of Baraboo, across the state by train, and then through downtown Milwaukee.

The Al. Ringling Theatre is a grand scale movie palace in downtown Baraboo, made possible through the financial assistance of the Ringling family. The Al Ringling home still exists.

Located near Baraboo is the Badger Army Ammunition Plant, which was the largest munitions factory in the world during World War II, when it was known as "Badger Ordnance Works". The plant is no longer in use.

The Culver's restaurant franchise has its headquarters in Prairie du Sac, and was first opened in Sauk City in 1984 by Craig Culver and his family. That same year, Cirrus Aircraft, now of Duluth, Minnesota, was founded in a rural Baraboo barn by brothers Alan and Dale Klapmeier to produce the VK-30 kit aircraft.

== Geography ==
Soils of Sauk County

According to the U.S. Census Bureau, the county has a total area of 849 square miles (2,200 km^{2}), of which 831 square miles (2,150 km^{2}) is land and 18 square miles (47 km^{2}) (2.1%) is water. Pewits Nest is located in Sauk County. Sauk Point is the county's highest point. The summit is nestled in the Baraboo bluffs and stands to 1,593 feet (486 m) above sea level.

=== Major highways ===
- Interstate 90
- Interstate 94
- U.S. Highway 12
- U.S. Highway 14
- Highway 13
- Highway 16
- Highway 23
- Highway 33
- Highway 58
- Highway 60
- Highway 78
- Highway 113
- Highway 130
- Highway 136
- Highway 154

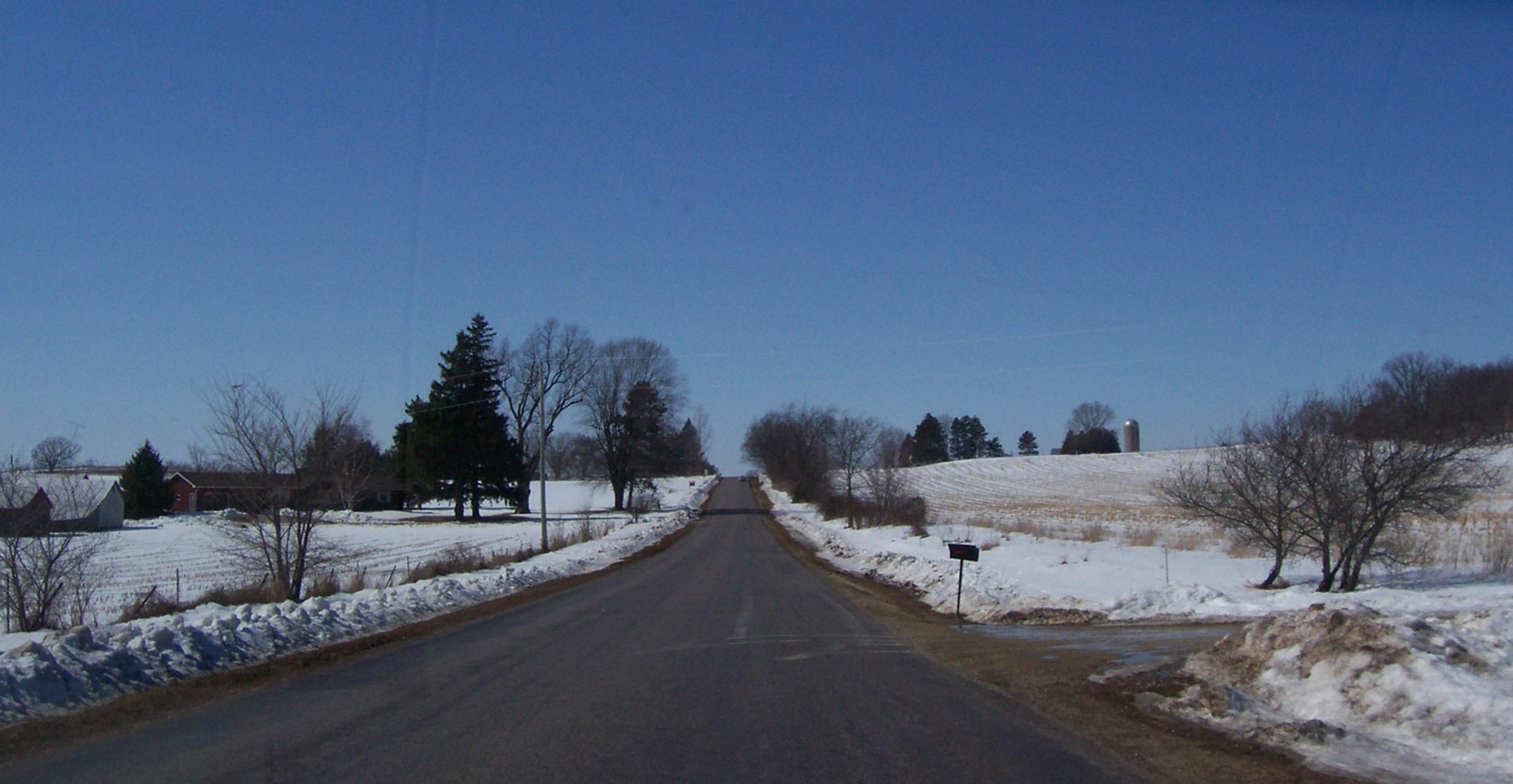
Typical Sauk County countryside

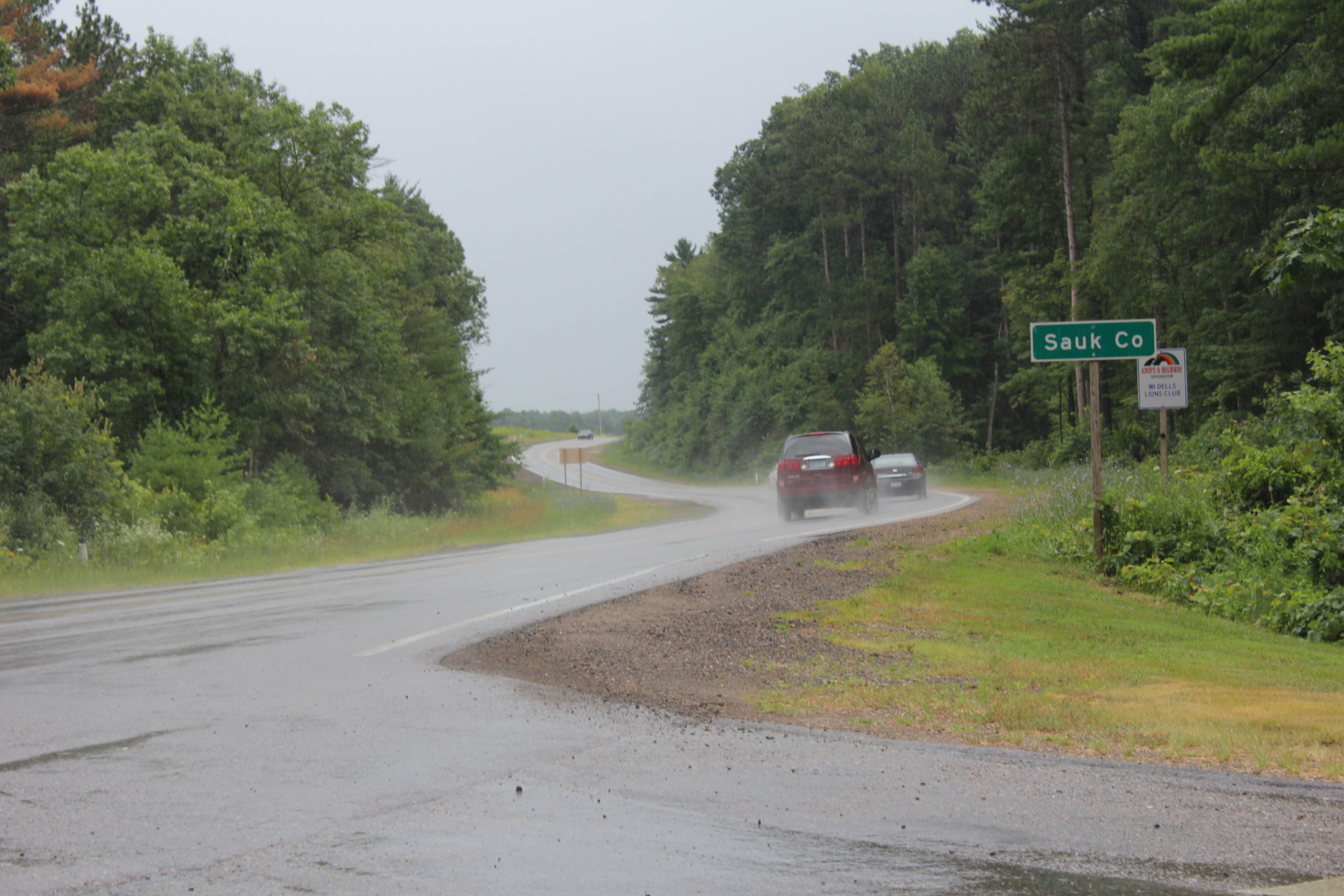
Sauk County sign on U.S. Route 12

=== Railroads ===
- Amtrak
- Canadian Pacific
- Wisconsin and Southern Railroad

=== Buses ===
- Baraboo Transit

=== Airports ===
- Baraboo-Wisconsin Dells Airport (KDLL) serves the county and surrounding communities.
- Tri-County Regional Airport (KLNR)
- Sauk–Prairie Airport (91C)
- Reedsburg Municipal Airport (C35)

=== Adjacent counties ===
- Juneau County - north
- Adams County - northeast
- Columbia County - east
- Dane County - southeast
- Iowa County - south
- Richland County - west
- Vernon County - northwest

== Demographics ==
Historical population
Census	Pop.	Note	%±
1840	102		—
1850	4,371		4,185.3%
1860	18,963		333.8%
1870	23,860		25.8%
1880	28,729		20.4%
1890	30,575		6.4%
1900	33,006		8.0%
1910	32,869		−0.4%
1920	32,548		−1.0%
1930	32,030		−1.6%
1940	33,700		5.2%
1950	38,120		13.1%
1960	36,179		−5.1%
1970	39,057		8.0%
1980	43,469		11.3%
1990	46,975		8.1%
2000	55,225		17.6%
2010	61,976		12.2%
2020	65,763		6.1%
2025 (est.)	66,652	▲	1.4%
U.S. Decennial Census; 1790–1960 1900–1990; 1990–2000 2010–2020

=== Racial and ethnic composition ===
Sauk County, Wisconsin – Racial and ethnic composition Note: the US Census treats Hispanic/Latino as an ethnic category. This table excludes Latinos from the racial categories and assigns them to a separate category. Hispanics/Latinos may be of any race.
Race / Ethnicity (NH = Non-Hispanic)	Pop 1980	Pop 1990	Pop 2000	Pop 2010	Pop 2020	% 1980	% 1990	% 2000	% 2010	% 2020
White alone (NH)	43,004	46,347	53,241	57,331	57,868	98.93%	98.66%	96.41%	92.51%	87.99%
Black or African American alone (NH)	30	53	138	330	578	0.07%	0.11%	0.25%	0.53%	0.88%
Native American or Alaska Native alone (NH)	185	286	462	690	764	0.43%	0.61%	0.84%	1.11%	1.16%
Asian alone (NH)	79	79	143	332	394	0.18%	0.17%	0.26%	0.54%	0.60%
Native Hawaiian or Pacific Islander alone (NH)	x	x	9	13	15	x	x	0.02%	0.02%	0.02%
Other race alone (NH)	18	3	12	30	148	0.04%	0.01%	0.02%	0.05%	0.23%
Mixed race or Multiracial (NH)	x	x	282	575	1,946	x	x	0.51%	0.93%	2.96%
Hispanic or Latino (any race)	153	207	938	2,675	4,050	0.35%	0.44%	1.70%	4.32%	6.16%
Total	43,469	46,975	55,225	61,976	65,763	100.00%	100.00%	100.00%	100.00%	100.00%

=== 2020 census ===
As of the 2020 census, the population was 65,763, the median age was 41.7 years, 22.1% of residents were under the age of 18, and 19.8% of residents were 65 years of age or older. For every 100 females there were 98.5 males, and for every 100 females age 18 and over there were 96.9 males age 18 and over.

The population density was 79.1 people per square mile (30.5 people/km^{2}). There were 30,784 housing units at an average density of 37.0 units per square mile (14.3 units/km^{2}).

The racial makeup of the county was 89.1% White, 0.9% Black or African American, 1.3% American Indian and Alaska Native, 0.6% Asian, <0.1% Native Hawaiian and Pacific Islander, 3.1% from some other race, and 4.9% from two or more races. Hispanic or Latino residents of any race comprised 6.2% of the population.

55.3% of residents lived in urban areas, while 44.7% lived in rural areas.

There were 27,094 households in the county, of which 27.9% had children under the age of 18 living in them. Of all households, 49.8% were married-couple households, 18.7% were households with a male householder and no spouse or partner present, and 23.4% were households with a female householder and no spouse or partner present. About 28.7% of all households were made up of individuals and 12.9% had someone living alone who was 65 years of age or older.

Of the housing units, 12.0% were vacant. Among occupied housing units, 70.3% were owner-occupied and 29.7% were renter-occupied. The homeowner vacancy rate was 0.9% and the rental vacancy rate was 6.9%.

2000 Census Age Pyramid for Sauk County

=== 2000 census ===
As of the census of 2000, there were 55,225 people, 21,644 households, and 14,869 families residing in the county. The population density was 66 people per square mile (25 people/km^{2}). There were 24,297 housing units at an average density of 29 units per square mile (11 units/km^{2}). The racial makeup of the county was 97.37% White, 0.26% Black or African American, 0.87% Native American, 0.26% Asian, 0.02% Pacific Islander, 0.59% from other races, and 0.64% from two or more races. 1.70% of the population were Hispanic or Latino of any race. 50.7% were of German, 8.5% Irish, 6.5% Norwegian, 6.2% American and 5.9% English ancestry. 95.5% spoke English, 1.9% Spanish and 1.4% German as their first language. There were 21,644 households, out of which 32.60% had children under the age of 18 living with them, 56.80% were married couples living together, 8.10% had a female householder with no husband present, and 31.30% were non-families. 25.20% of all households were made up of individuals, and 10.60% had someone living alone who was 65 years of age or older. The average household size was 2.51 and the average family size was 3.03.

In the county, the population was spread out, with 26.00% under the age of 18, 7.40% from 18 to 24, 29.30% from 25 to 44, 22.80% from 45 to 64, and 14.50% who were 65 years of age or older. The median age was 37 years. For every 100 females, there were 97.70 males. For every 100 females age 18 and over, there were 95.20 males.

== Communities ==
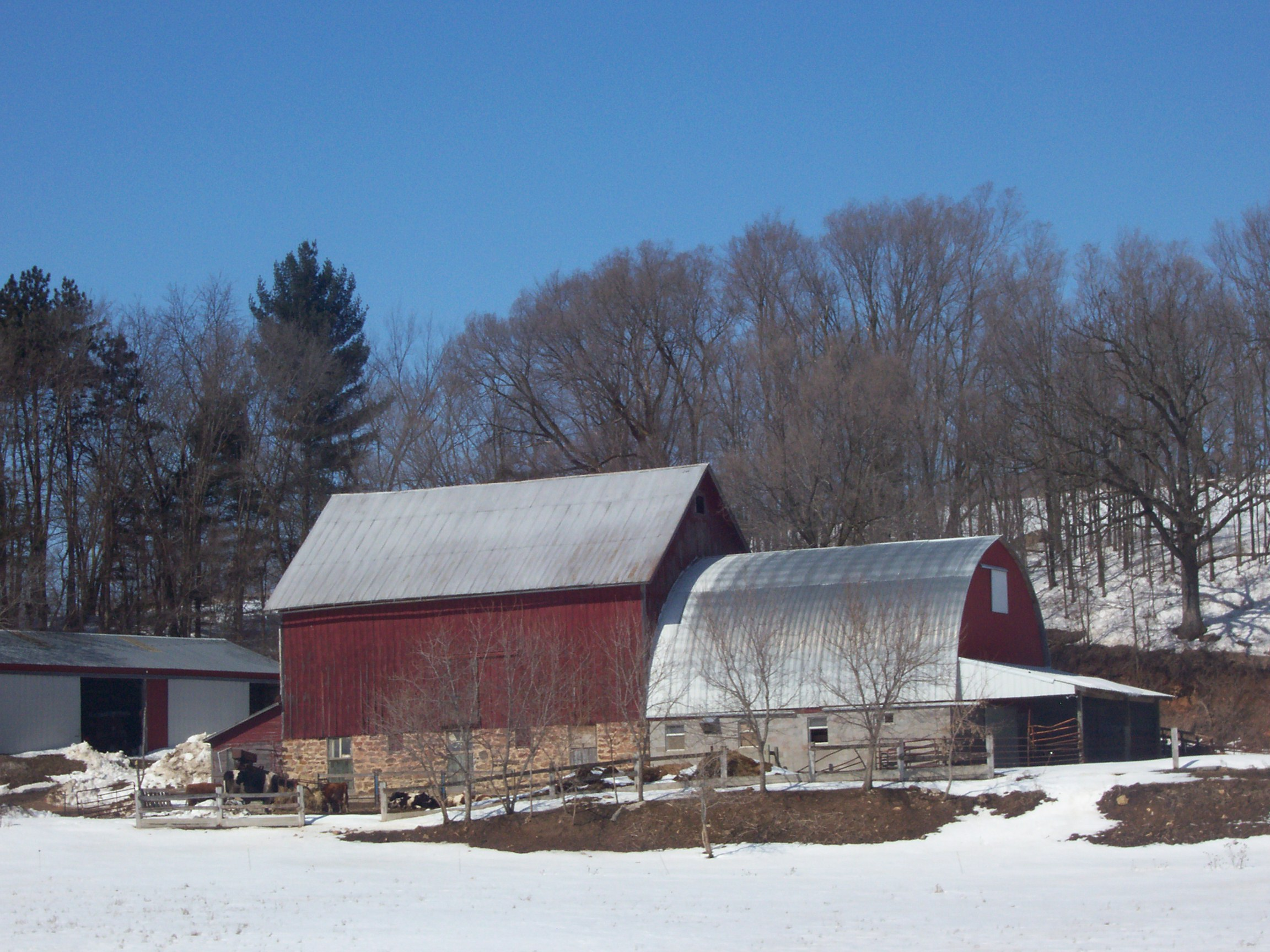
Farming in Sauk County near Reedsburg

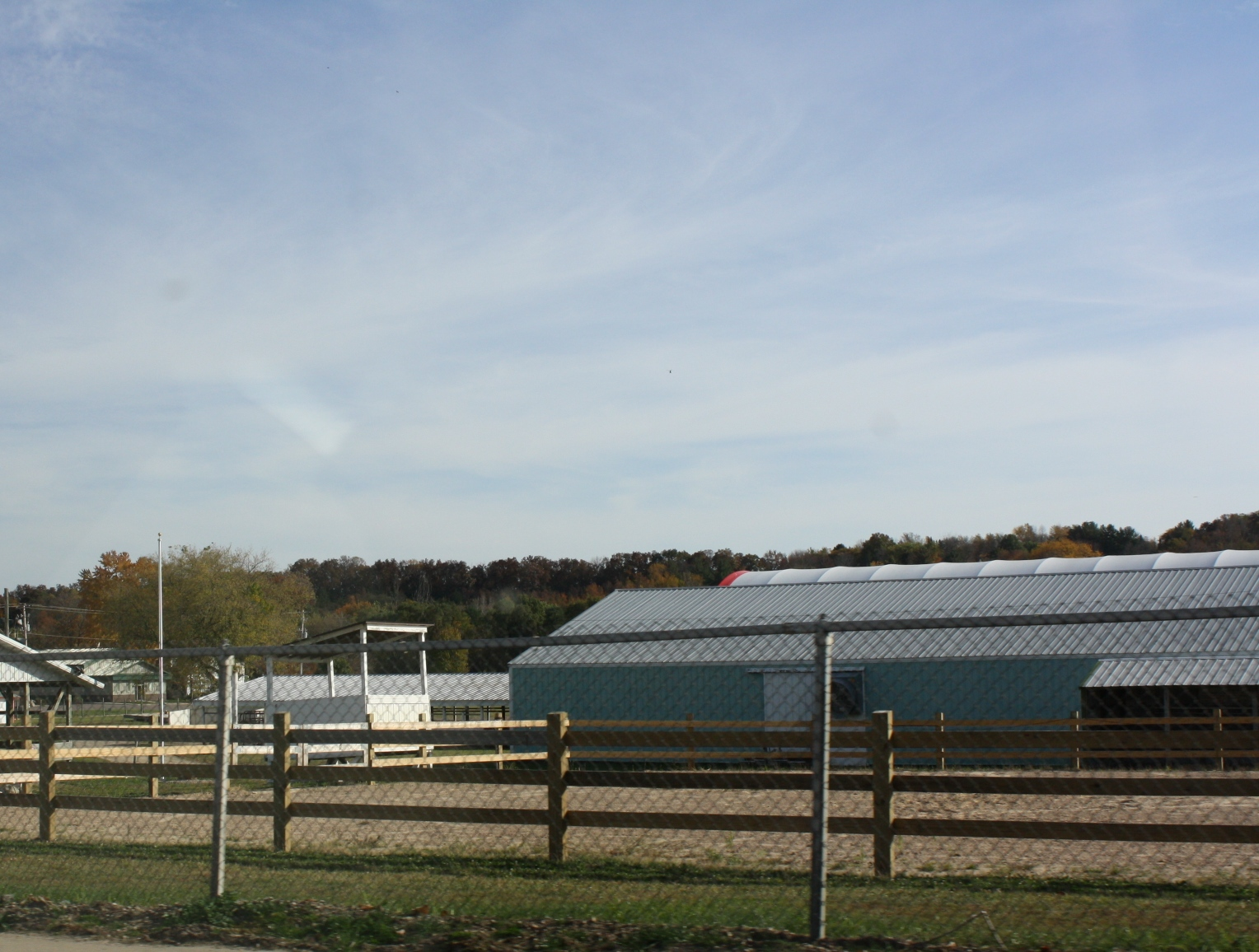
Fairgrounds in Baraboo

=== Cities ===
- Baraboo (county seat)
- Reedsburg
- Wisconsin Dells (mostly in Columbia County, Adams County and Juneau County)

=== Villages ===
- Cazenovia (partly in Richland County)
- Ironton
- La Valle
- Lake Delton
- Lime Ridge
- Loganville
- Merrimac
- North Freedom
- Plain
- Prairie du Sac
- Rock Springs
- Sauk City
- Spring Green
- West Baraboo

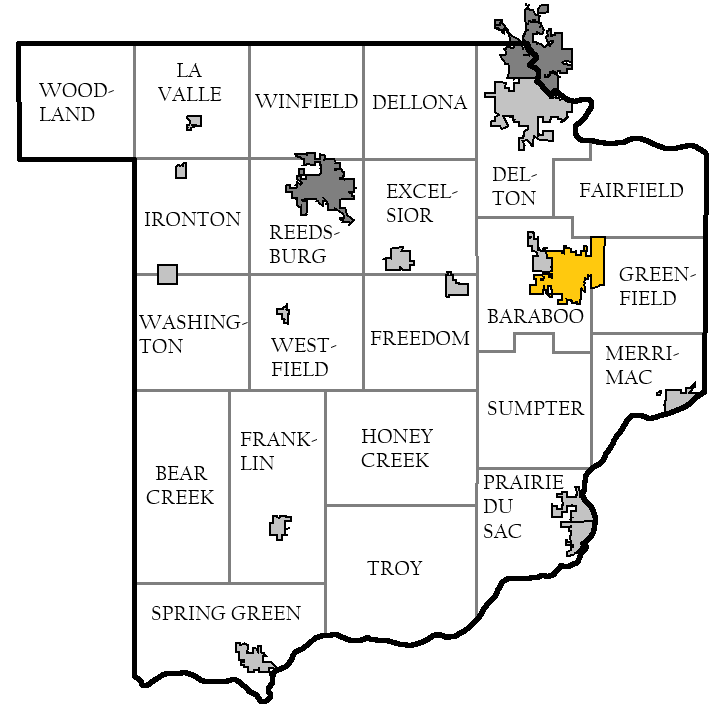
Towns of Sauk County

=== Towns ===
- Baraboo
- Bear Creek
- Dellona
- Delton
- Excelsior
- Fairfield
- Franklin
- Freedom
- Greenfield
- Honey Creek
- Ironton
- La Valle
- Merrimac
- Prairie du Sac
- Reedsburg
- Spring Green
- Sumpter
- Troy
- Washington
- Westfield
- Winfield
- Woodland

=== Census-designated places ===
- Bluffview
- Lake Wisconsin (partial)

=== Other unincorporated communities ===
- Black Hawk
- Cassell
- Crawford Crossing
- Dellwood
- Denzer
- Greens Corners
- Hill Point
- La Rue
- Leland
- Loddes Mill
- Loreta
- Moon Valley
- Sandusky
- Valton
- Witwen

== Politics ==
United States presidential election results for Sauk County, Wisconsin
Year	Republican		Democratic		Third party(ies)	
Year	No.	%	No.	%	No.	%
1892	3,277	47.76%	3,139	45.74%	446	6.50%
1896	4,623	60.95%	2,611	34.42%	351	4.63%
1900	4,329	60.89%	2,491	35.04%	290	4.08%
1904	4,805	67.53%	1,914	26.90%	396	5.57%
1908	3,854	57.06%	2,571	38.07%	329	4.87%
1912	2,171	37.91%	2,464	43.02%	1,092	19.07%
1916	3,779	59.66%	2,257	35.63%	298	4.70%
1920	8,074	84.79%	946	9.93%	502	5.27%
1924	3,935	35.60%	555	5.02%	6,562	59.37%
1928	7,496	58.89%	5,151	40.47%	82	0.64%
1932	5,063	39.35%	7,638	59.36%	166	1.29%
1936	5,626	37.98%	8,355	56.41%	831	5.61%
1940	9,363	59.61%	6,106	38.87%	238	1.52%
1944	9,751	62.72%	5,690	36.60%	105	0.68%
1948	7,140	53.66%	5,831	43.82%	336	2.52%
1952	12,347	69.89%	5,267	29.81%	52	0.29%
1956	10,644	66.46%	5,292	33.04%	80	0.50%
1960	10,403	61.68%	6,441	38.19%	23	0.14%
1964	6,345	40.53%	9,288	59.33%	23	0.15%
1968	8,608	53.64%	6,406	39.92%	1,034	6.44%
1972	10,285	58.79%	6,980	39.90%	228	1.30%
1976	9,577	49.90%	9,204	47.96%	411	2.14%
1980	9,992	49.48%	8,456	41.87%	1,747	8.65%
1984	11,069	60.44%	7,158	39.09%	86	0.47%
1988	10,225	54.72%	8,324	44.54%	138	0.74%
1992	8,886	37.94%	9,128	38.97%	5,408	23.09%
1996	7,448	36.72%	9,889	48.75%	2,948	14.53%
2000	11,586	45.16%	13,035	50.81%	1,032	4.02%
2004	14,415	47.39%	15,708	51.64%	294	0.97%
2008	11,562	37.75%	18,617	60.79%	447	1.46%
2012	12,838	40.21%	18,736	58.68%	353	1.11%
2016	14,799	47.20%	14,690	46.85%	1,868	5.96%
2020	17,493	48.32%	18,108	50.02%	602	1.66%
2024	18,798	50.02%	18,172	48.35%	614	1.63%

Sauk County voted for Republicans in all but five elections prior to 1992, thereafter trending Democratic. In 2016 Donald Trump won the county by 109 votes, in 2020 it flipped Democratic to Joe Biden, and in 2024 Trump flipped it back.

Since 1992 the county has voted for the statewide winner in every election, and is thus considered a bellwether politically.

== Economy ==
The county's largest employer is the Ho-Chunk Nation, which employs roughly 3100 people combined in Jackson and Sauk counties. Tourism is a major contributor to Sauk County's economy. Although it is Wisconsin's 25th largest county in population, it is the third largest in terms of economic impact from tourism (nearly $2 billion in 2023).

== Education ==
=== School districts ===
School districts include:

- Baraboo School District
- Hillsboro School District
- Ithaca School District
- School District of Reedsburg
- River Valley School District
- Sauk Prairie School District
- Weston School District
- School District of Wisconsin Dells
- Wonewoc-Union Center School District

Associated high schools include:

- Baraboo High School
- Reedsburg Area High School
- River Valley High School
- Sauk Prairie High School
- Weston High School
- Wisconsin Dells High School

=== Tertiary education ===
The county is directly served by Madison Area Technical College with a branch campus in Reedsburg. Nearby universities include University of Wisconsin–Madison, which is only 30 miles outside the county.

The county was served by University of Wisconsin Platteville-Baraboo/Sauk County, a freshman-sophomore college, from 1968 until 2026.

== See also ==
- A Sand County Almanac
- Badger Army Ammunition Plant
- Devil's Lake State Park (Wisconsin)
- National Register of Historic Places listings in Sauk County, Wisconsin
- Sauk Prairie, Wisconsin
