= Willow, Wisconsin =

- Town
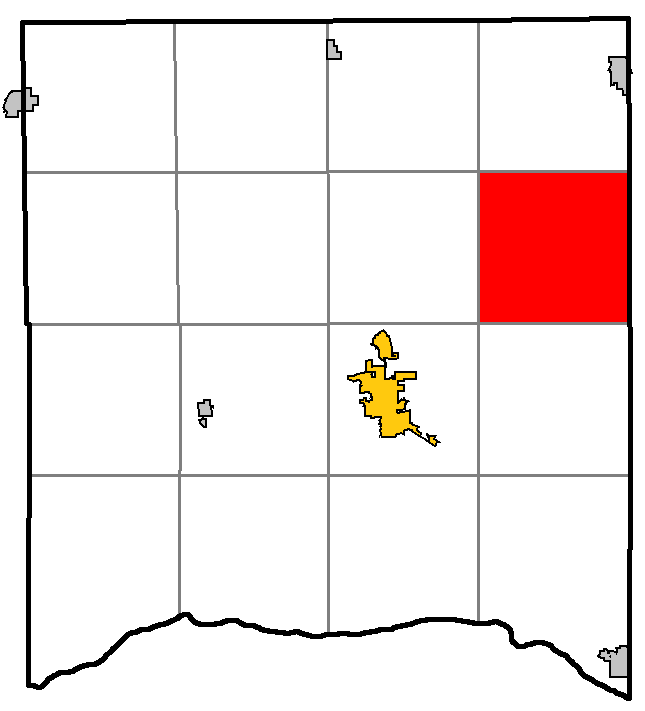
- Location of Willow, Wisconsin

- Location of Richland County, Wisconsin
- Coordinates: 43°26′15″N 90°15′1″W
- Country: United States
- State: Wisconsin
- County: Richland

Area
  - Total: 35.8 sq mi (92.8 km^{2})
  - Land: 35.8 sq mi (92.8 km^{2})
  - Water: 0 sq mi (0.0 km^{2})
- Elevation: 830 ft (253 m)

Population (2020)
  - Total: 496
  - Density: 13.8/sq mi (5.34/km^{2})
- Time zone: UTC-6 (Central (CST))
  - Summer (DST): UTC-5 (CDT)
- Area code: 608
- FIPS code: 55-87250
- GNIS feature ID: 1584441

Willow is a town in Richland County, Wisconsin, United States. The population was 496 at the 2020 census. The unincorporated community of Loyd is located in the town.

== Geography ==
According to the United States Census Bureau, the town has a total area of 35.8 square miles (92.8 km^{2}), of which 35.8 square miles (92.8 km^{2}) is land and 0.03% is water.

== Demographics ==
As of the census of 2000, there were 493 people, 182 households, and 139 families residing in the town. The population density was 13.8 people per square mile (5.3/km^{2}). There were 242 housing units at an average density of 6.8 per square mile (2.6/km^{2}). The racial makeup of the town was 97.97% White, 0.20% Asian, 0.41% Pacific Islander, 0.20% from other races, and 1.22% from two or more races. Hispanic or Latino of any race were 0.41% of the population.

There were 182 households, out of which 33.0% had children under the age of 18 living with them, 65.4% were married couples living together, 7.1% had a female householder with no husband present, and 23.6% were non-families. 19.8% of all households were made up of individuals, and 8.2% had someone living alone who was 65 years of age or older. The average household size was 2.69 and the average family size was 3.09.

In the town, the population was spread out, with 27.6% under the age of 18, 6.9% from 18 to 24, 28.0% from 25 to 44, 25.8% from 45 to 64, and 11.8% who were 65 years of age or older. The median age was 37 years. For every 100 females, there were 116.2 males. For every 100 females age 18 and over, there were 111.2 males.

The median income for a household in the town was $41,607, and the median income for a family was $43,906. Males had a median income of $26,731 versus $18,438 for females. The per capita income for the town was $17,100. About 6.1% of families and 10.1% of the population were below the poverty line, including 9.4% of those under age 18 and 4.9% of those age 65 or over.
