= Washington, Sauk County, Wisconsin =

Washington, Wisconsin
- Town
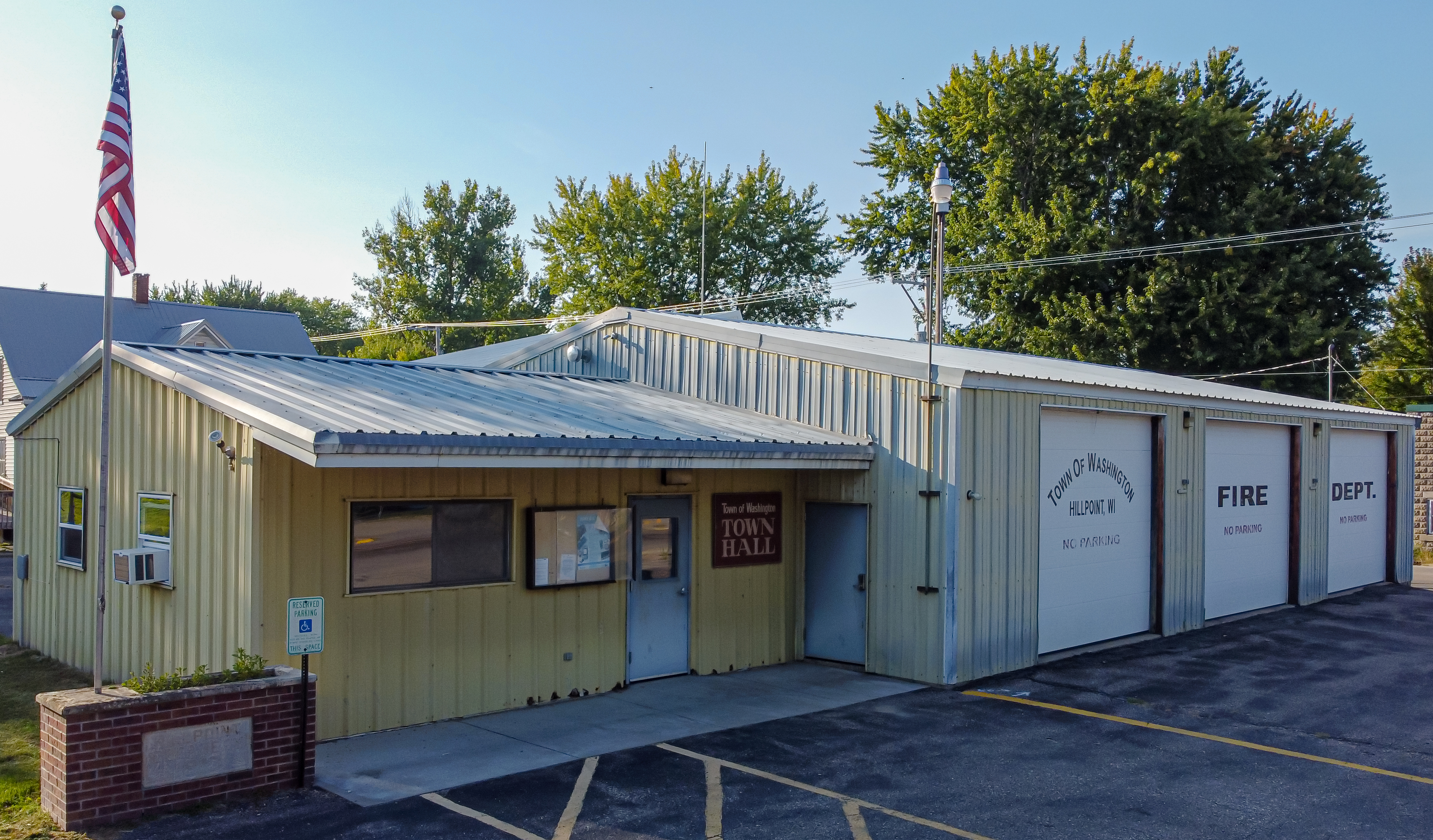
- Town hall

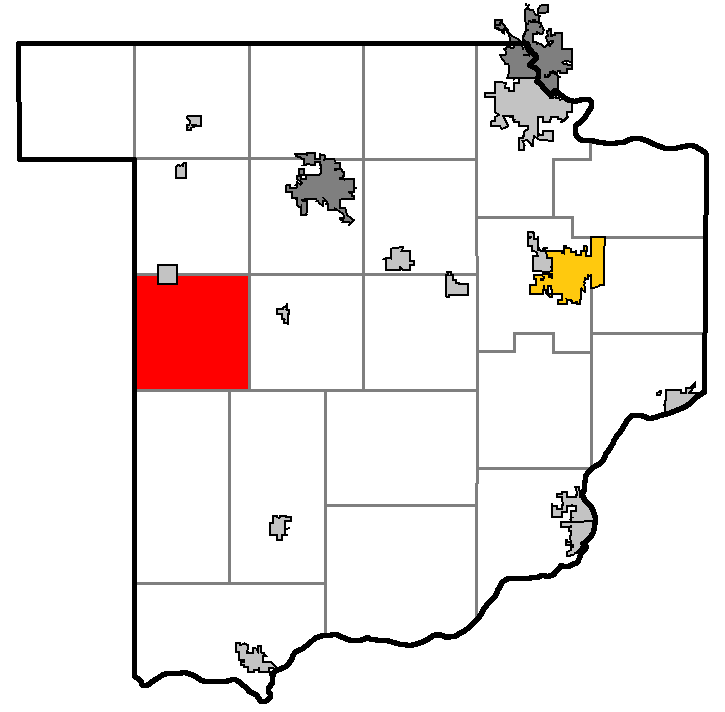
- Location of Washington, Sauk County, Wisconsin

- Location of Sauk County, Wisconsin
- Coordinates: 43°25′27″N 90°6′58″W
- Country: United States
- State: Wisconsin
- County: Sauk

Area
  - Total: 35.6 sq mi (92.1 km^{2})
  - Land: 35.6 sq mi (92.1 km^{2})
  - Water: 0 sq mi (0.0 km^{2})
- Elevation: 1,112 ft (339 m)

Population (2020)
  - Total: 1,021
  - Density: 28.7/sq mi (11.1/km^{2})
- Time zone: UTC-6 (Central (CST))
  - Summer (DST): UTC-5 (CDT)
- Area code: 608
- FIPS code: 55-83700
- GNIS feature ID: 1584357
- Website: https://sites.google.com/view/townofwashington-saukcounty/home

Washington is a town in Sauk County, Wisconsin, United States. The population was 1,021 at the 2020 census. The unincorporated communities of Hill Point and Sandusky are located in the town.

== Geography ==
According to the United States Census Bureau, the town has a total area of 35.6 square miles (92.1 km^{2}), of which 35.6 square miles (92.1 km^{2}) is land and 0.03% is water.

== Demographics ==
As of the 2000 census, there were 904 people, 281 households, and 232 families residing in the town. The population density was 25.4 people per square mile (9.8/km^{2}). There were 305 housing units at an average density of 8.6 per square mile (3.3/km^{2}). The racial makeup of the town was 98.78% White, 0.22% African American, 0.22% Native American, 0.66% from other races, and 0.11% from two or more races. Hispanic or Latino of any race were 1.88% of the population.

There were 281 households, out of which 39.9% had children under the age of 18 living with them, 71.2% were married couples living together, 5.3% had a female householder with no husband present, and 17.4% were non-families. 14.9% of all households were made up of individuals, and 8.2% had someone living alone who was 65 years of age or older. The average household size was 3.22 and the average family size was 3.56.

The population was 34.0% under the age of 18, 7.7% from 18 to 24, 24.9% from 25 to 44, 23.6% from 45 to 64, and 9.8% who were 65 years of age or older. The median age was 33 years. For every 100 females, there were 105.0 males. For every 100 females age 18 and over, there were 105.9 males.

The median income for a household in the town was $41,563, and the median income for a family was $45,750. Males had a median income of $29,545 versus $19,276 for females. The per capita income for the town was $13,920. About 7.3% of families and 11.5% of the population were below the poverty line, including 16.6% of those under age 18 and 7.1% of those age 65 or over.
