= Loganville, Wisconsin =

- Village
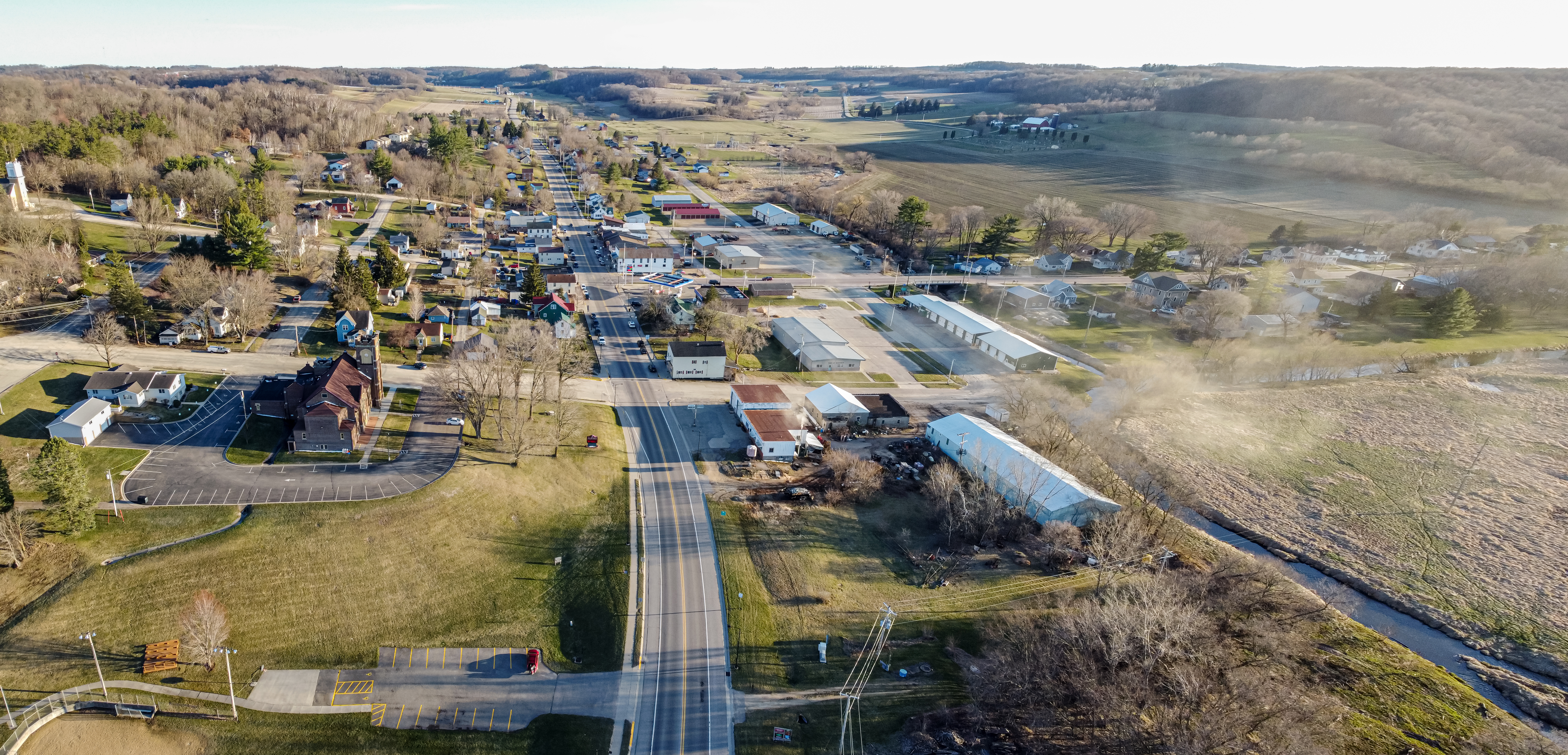
- Wis-23 & Wis-154 junction in town

- Location of Loganville in Sauk County, Wisconsin.
- Coordinates: 43°26′23″N 90°2′14″W
- Country: United States
- State: Wisconsin
- County: Sauk

Area
  - Total: 0.27 sq mi (0.70 km^{2})
  - Land: 0.27 sq mi (0.69 km^{2})
  - Water: 0.0039 sq mi (0.01 km^{2})
- Elevation: 935 ft (285 m)

Population (2020)
  - Total: 301
  - Density: 1,100/sq mi (440/km^{2})
- Time zone: UTC-6 (Central (CST))
  - Summer (DST): UTC-5 (CDT)
- Area code: 608
- FIPS code: 55-45400
- GNIS feature ID: 1568495
- Website: https://villageofloganvillewi.com/

Loganville is a village in Sauk County, Wisconsin, United States. The population was 301 at the 2020 census. The village was named for Chauncey P. Logan, who built the first house in 1853.

== Geography ==
Loganville is located at 43°26′23″N 90°2′14″W (43.439816, -90.037094).

According to the United States Census Bureau, the village has a total area of 0.26 square miles (0.67 km^{2}), of which 0.25 square miles (0.65 km^{2}) is land and 0.01 square miles (0.03 km^{2}) is water.

== Demographics ==
Historical population
Census	Pop.	Note	%±
1920	265		—
1930	228		−14.0%
1940	236		3.5%
1950	250		5.9%
1960	220		−12.0%
1970	199		−9.5%
1980	239		20.1%
1990	228		−4.6%
2000	276		21.1%
2010	300		8.7%
2020	301		0.3%
U.S. Decennial Census

=== 2010 census ===
As of the census of 2010, there were 300 people, 126 households, and 82 families living in the village. The population density was 1,200.0 inhabitants per square mile (463.3/km^{2}). There were 139 housing units at an average density of 556.0 per square mile (214.7/km^{2}). The racial makeup of the village was 98.0% White, 0.3% African American, 0.3% Native American, 0.3% Pacific Islander, 0.3% from other races, and 0.7% from two or more races. Hispanic or Latino of any race were 1.3% of the population.

There were 126 households, of which 32.5% had children under the age of 18 living with them, 46.8% were married couples living together, 14.3% had a female householder with no husband present, 4.0% had a male householder with no wife present, and 34.9% were non-families. 27.0% of all households were made up of individuals, and 12.7% had someone living alone who was 65 years of age or older. The average household size was 2.38 and the average family size was 2.87.

The median age in the village was 37.9 years. 24.3% of residents were under the age of 18; 8.9% were between the ages of 18 and 24; 27.4% were from 25 to 44; 26.1% were from 45 to 64; and 13.3% were 65 years of age or older. The gender makeup of the village was 48.0% male and 52.0% female.

=== 2000 census ===
As of the census of 2000, there were 276 people, 119 households, and 81 families living in the village. The population density was 1,408.2 people per square mile (532.8/km^{2}). There were 130 housing units at an average density of 663.3 per square mile (251.0/km^{2}). The racial makeup of the village was 100.00% White. Hispanic or Latino of any race were 0.36% of the population.

There were 119 households, out of which 33.6% had children under the age of 18 living with them, 52.1% were married couples living together, 10.9% had a female householder with no husband present, and 31.9% were non-families. 28.6% of all households were made up of individuals, and 11.8% had someone living alone who was 65 years of age or older. The average household size was 2.32 and the average family size was 2.85.

In the village, the population was spread out, with 24.6% under the age of 18, 7.2% from 18 to 24, 34.8% from 25 to 44, 21.7% from 45 to 64, and 11.6% who were 65 years of age or older. The median age was 36 years. For every 100 females, there were 95.7 males. For every 100 females age 18 and over, there were 92.6 males.

The median income for a household in the village was $34,688, and the median income for a family was $38,250. Males had a median income of $28,750 versus $20,000 for females. The per capita income for the village was $15,737. About 5.6% of families and 7.9% of the population were below the poverty line, including 11.1% of those under the age of eighteen and 16.7% of those 65 or over.

== Education ==
Loganville is served by the School District of Reedsburg, which has four elementary schools, one intermediate school, one middle school and one high school. Loganville Elementary School is the only school located in Loganville.

== Notable people ==
- David B. Hulburt, Wisconsin state legislator, surveyor, and farmer, lived in Loganville.
- Brenda Statz, mental-health activist

== Images ==
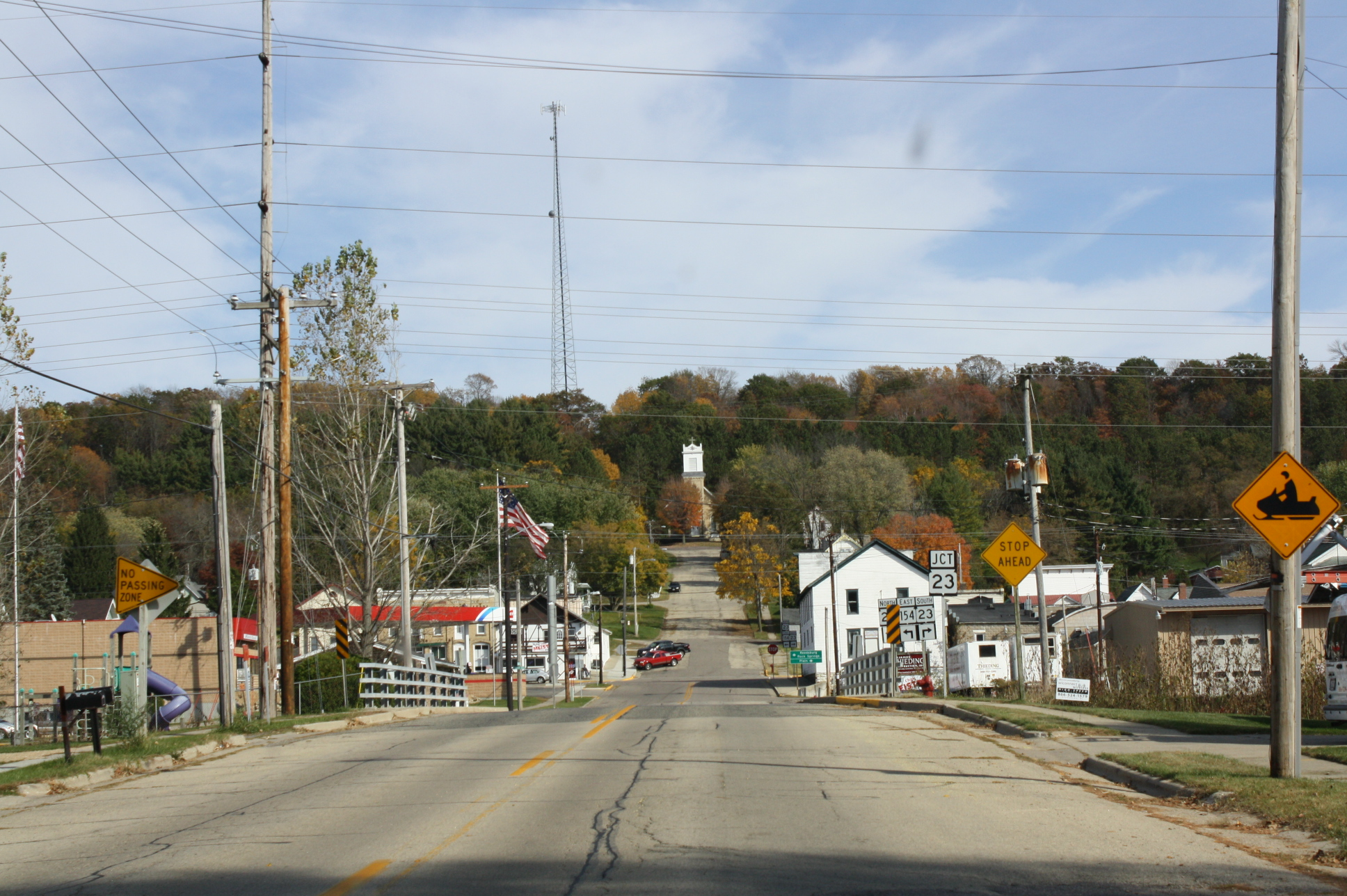
Looking east at downtown Loganville

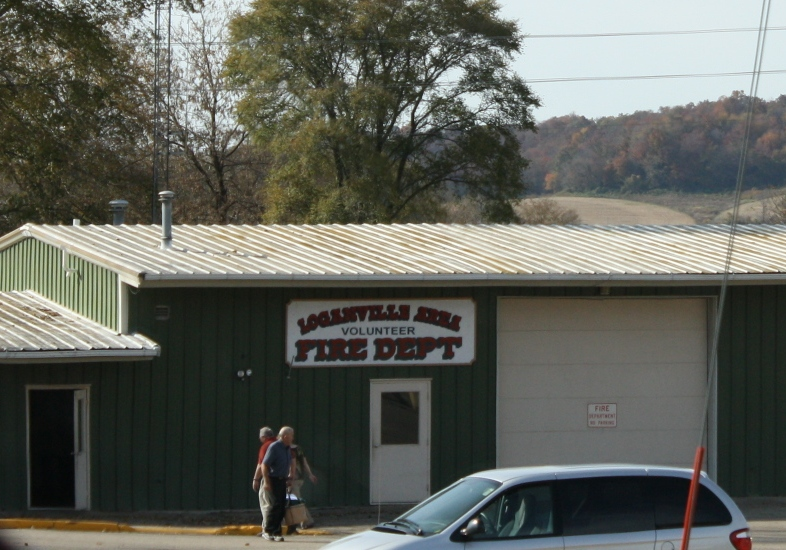
Fire station

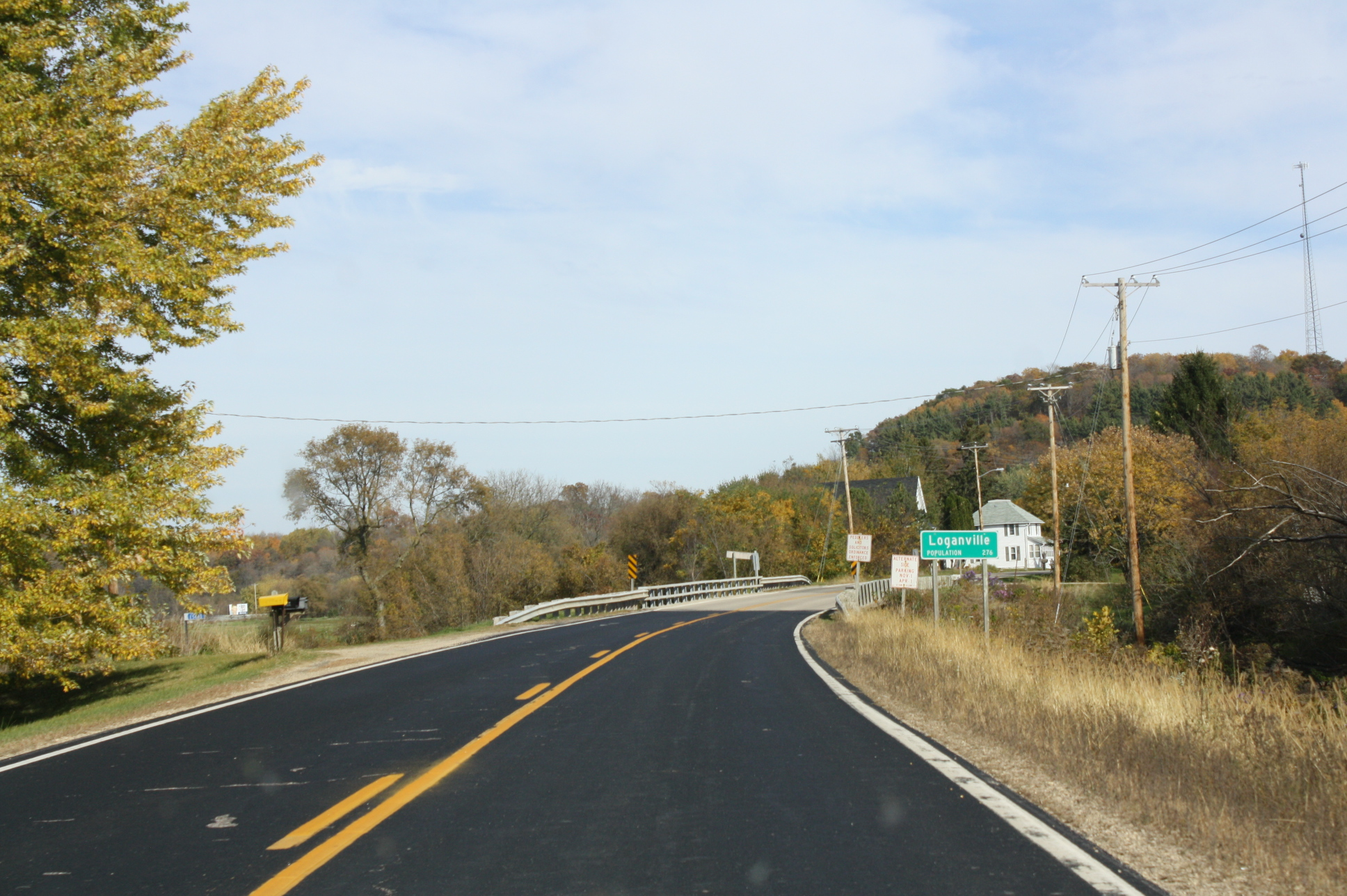
Sign on WIS 154

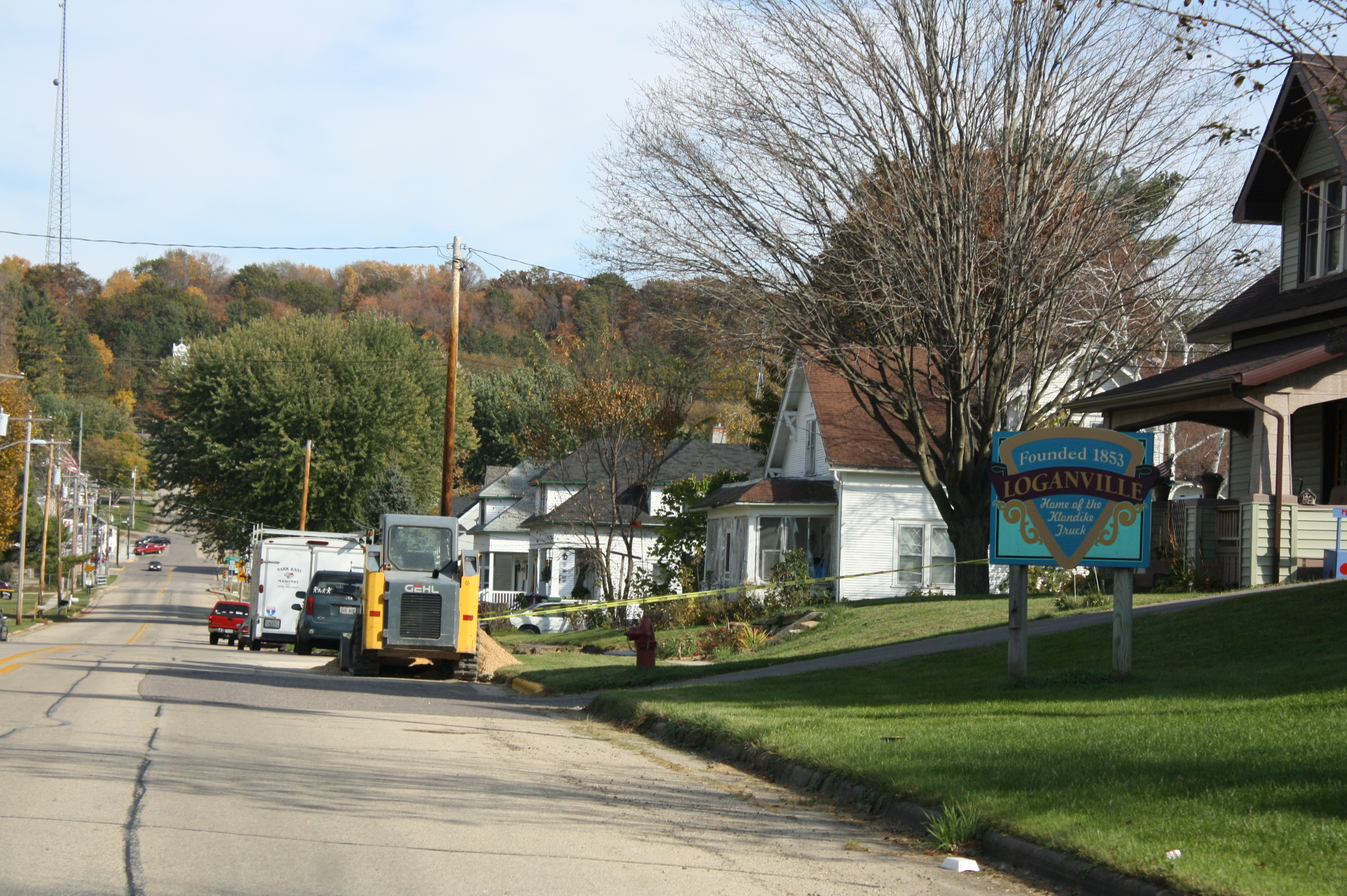
Welcome sign

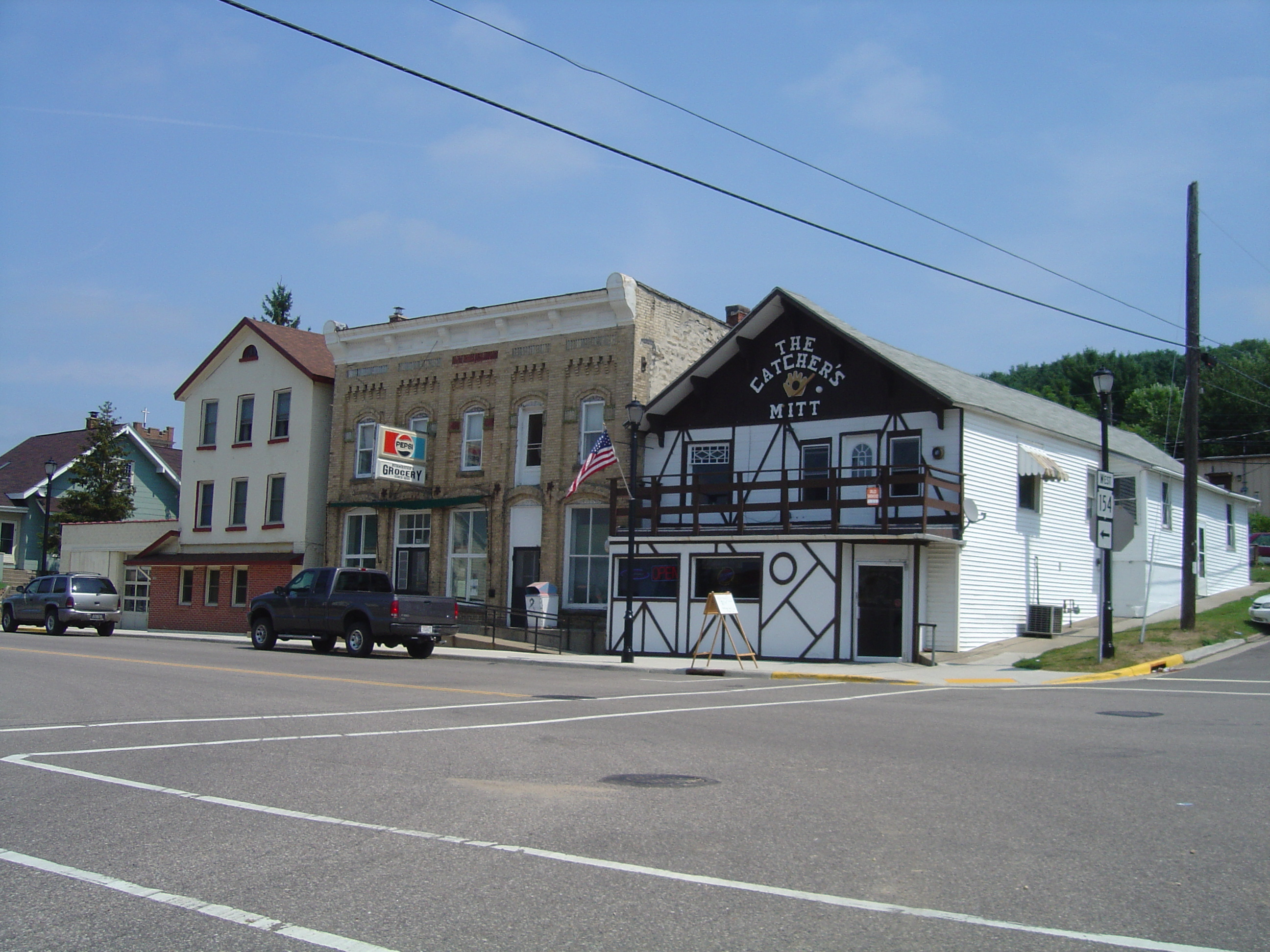
Downtown Loganville
