= National Register of Historic Places listings in Sauk County, Wisconsin =

Location of Sauk County in Wisconsin

This is a list of the National Register of Historic Places listings in Sauk County, Wisconsin. It is intended to provide a comprehensive listing of entries in the National Register of Historic Places that are located in Sauk County, Wisconsin. The locations of National Register properties for which the latitude and longitude coordinates are included below may be seen on a map.

There are 62 properties and districts listed on the National Register in the county. Three of these are further designated as National Historic Landmarks.

This National Park Service list is complete through NPS recent listings posted November 13, 2026.

== Current listings ==
	Name on the Register	Image	Date listed	Location	City or town	Description
1	Baraboo Public Library	Baraboo Public Library	September 14, 1981 (#81000058)	230 4th Ave. 43°28′16″N 89°44′44″W	Baraboo	1903 Carnegie library designed in Neoclassical style by Louis Claude. Served the workers at Badger Ordnance during World War II, and still serves the community.
2	Baraboo Chicago & North Western Depot and Division Offices	Baraboo Chicago & North Western Depot and Division Offices	April 25, 2022 (#100007642)	220 Lynn St. 43°27′55″N 89°44′31″W	Baraboo	2-story brick depot of the C&NW Railroad, designed by Frost & Granger and built in 1902.
3	Chicago and North Western Depot	Chicago and North Western Depot	December 26, 1984 (#84000639)	240 Railroad St. 43°31′49″N 90°00′27″W	Reedsburg	1905 red brick depot of Chicago and North Western Railway with a Classical Revival entry. At this site in 1873 a crowd of Reedsburg locals protested the deportation of a local Ho-Chunk family to Nebraska.
4	City Hotel	City Hotel	December 26, 1984 (#84000642)	125 Main St. 43°31′57″N 90°00′33″W	Reedsburg	Red brick hotel built in 1886 in Second Empire style by Abner Harris' building company for German immigrant William Roper, who operated the hotel.
5	William Clark House	William Clark House	April 8, 1980 (#80000193)	320 Walnut St. 43°27′48″N 89°44′27″W	Baraboo	Second Empire styled house with mansard roof built in mid-1800s. Clark was an engineer for the C&NW.
6	J. W. Corwith Livery	J. W. Corwith Livery	April 20, 2004 (#84004018)	121 S. Webb Ave. 43°31′54″N 90°00′34″W	Reedsburg	Livery stable, built in 1911 near the hotels and the depot, where a traveler could rent a horse and buggy or board a horse. Only a few livery buildings are left in the state.
7	August W. Derleth House	August W. Derleth House	April 30, 1991 (#91000468)	S10431a Lueders Rd. 43°15′59″N 89°44′26″W	Sauk City	Derleth built this home from local limestone near his beloved Wisconsin River about 1939 to house his books and his writing career. He called his home Place of Hawks.
8	Devil's Lake State Park	Devil's Lake State Park	January 21, 2015 (#14001192)	S5975 Park Rd. 43°25′39″N 89°44′02″W	Baraboo vicinity	The lake between two stone bluffs was sacred to Native Americans, who built effigy mounds on its shores. The state park was founded in 1911. The CCCs built most of the rustic structures in the 1930s. Now Wisconsin's largest and most popular state park.
9	Downtown Baraboo Historic District	Downtown Baraboo Historic District	June 8, 2015 (#15000340)	Roughly bounded by 5th & 2nd Aves., 5th, Ash, 1st, Oak & Birch Sts. 43°28′13″N 89°44′39″W	Baraboo	Concentration of 75 commercial and civic buildings including the 1872 Italianate Draper Brothers Meat Market, the 1873 Moeller Wagon Shop, the 1885 Ewing Livery, the 1888 Miller Saloon, the 1896 Civil War Memorial, the 1896 Romanesque Revival First Methodist Episcopal Church, the 1900 Romanesque Wellington Hotel, the 1907 Baraboo Steam Laundry, the 1922 Colonial Revival Trimpey Building, the 1928 Prairie Style Baraboo High School, and the 1938 Art Moderne Juliar Theatre.
10	Durst-Bloedau Site	Durst-Bloedau Site	December 19, 1978 (#78000137)	North of Leland	Leland	50-foot-long rock shelter, in which Archaic and later points have been found.
11	Freedom Mine	Freedom Mine	June 11, 2020 (#100005266)	S5910 Cty. Rd. PF; 43°25′52″N 89°53′51″W	Freedom	Small iron mine opened in 1910 by C.T. Roberts and closed the next year when it abruptly flooded, leaving shafts, tools, tracks and ore carts submerged and undisturbed since 1911. Foundations of the engine house, compressor, boiler house, and rail spur remain above ground.
12	Freethinkers' Hall	Freethinkers' Hall	March 31, 1988 (#88000237)	309 Polk St. 43°16′34″N 89°43′28″W	Sauk City	1884 meeting hall designed by Alfred Clas. The Freethinkers' congregation was formed by German immigrants in 1852, and meets to this day, the last such congregation in North America.
13	Gust Brothers' Store	Gust Brothers' Store	August 5, 2002 (#02000834)	101 Fourth St. 43°28′16″N 89°44′32″W	Baraboo	1877 limestone commercial building, with Italianate features. Originally a meat market, it later housed banks and offices.
14	Edward M. Hackett House	Edward M. Hackett House	December 26, 1984 (#84000644)	612 E. Main St. 43°31′56″N 90°00′08″W	Reedsburg	High Victorian Gothic home built 1877-78 by Edward M. Hackett, a local lumberman, builder and architect.
15	Otto Sr. and Lisette Hahn House	Otto Sr. and Lisette Hahn House	January 4, 2012 (#11001015)	626 Water St. 43°16′26″N 89°43′13″W	Sauk City	Red brick house built between 1850 and 1857. Hahn, an immigrant harness-maker bought the house in 1866 and built a workshop next to it. After his wife Lisette died in 1871, he raised the children in the house.
16	Abner L. Harris House	Abner L. Harris House	December 26, 1984 (#84000649)	226 N. Pine St. 43°31′58″N 90°00′13″W	Reedsburg	Three story Second Empire house built around 1873. Harris was postmaster, mayor, merchant and promoter of Reedsburg.
17	Harrisburg School	Harrisburg School	March 24, 2015 (#15000109)	E7646 Cty. Rd. B 43°15′23″N 89°56′22″W	Troy	One-room rural school rebuilt in 1890s on site of an 1856 school. Served as a school until 1955, when it closed for school consolidation.
18	Honey Creek Swiss Rural Historic District	Honey Creek Swiss Rural Historic District	April 6, 1990 (#89000484)	W of Prairie du Sac; 43°18′10″N 89°51′08″W	Prairie du Sac	Rural area settled chiefly by immigrants from Graubünden canton, Switzerland starting in 1842. Some characteristic stone and timber-framed buildings remain.
19	Hulburt Creek Garden Beds	Hulburt Creek Garden Beds	August 8, 1991 (#91000958)	Birchwood Road near CTH H 43°37′08″N 89°49′38″W	Delton	Raised garden beds built around 1000 AD. The oldest radio-carbon dated ridged fields in the upper Midwest.
20	Island Woolen Company Office Building	Island Woolen Company Office Building	August 18, 2011 (#11000559)	900 2nd Ave. 43°28′10″N 89°45′24″W	Baraboo	Only remaining building from textile mill complex, designed by Claude & Starck in Prairie School style and built 1917-18. In the 1920s, Island Woolen was the biggest employer in Sauk County.
21	Lachmund Family House	Lachmund Family House	March 29, 2000 (#00000257)	717 Water St. 43°16′22″N 89°43′16″W	Sauk City	Gothic Revival-styled home built in 1861 by Charles Halasz, who founded Lachmund Lumber Company. Now apartments.
22	Aldo Leopold Shack	Aldo Leopold Shack	July 14, 1978 (#78000082)	Levee Rd. 43°33′46″N 89°39′33″W	Baraboo vicinity	Former chicken coop where conservationist Aldo Leopold wrote much of A Sand County Almanac.
23	Main Street Commercial Historic District	Main Street Commercial Historic District	December 26, 1984 (#84000654)	Roughly bounded by N. Park, S. Park, N. Walnut, and S. Walnut Sts. on Main; 43°31′57″N 90°00′25″W	Reedsburg	Commercial buildings in various styles, ranging from the 1873 Italianate Kelsey Block to the 1888 Romanesque Revival Free Press Block, to the large 1896 Queen Anne Hotel Stolte, to the 1920 Neoclassical Reedsburg Bank.
24	Man Mound	Man Mound	November 30, 1978 (#78000138)	East of Baraboo off WI 33 on Man Mound Road; 43°29′19″N 89°40′15″W	Baraboo vicinity	The only remaining man-shaped effigy mound in the Upper Midwest, built by Late Woodland people between 750 and 1200 AD. Designated a National Historic Landmark in 2016.
25	Manchester Street Bridge	Manchester Street Bridge	October 13, 1988 (#88002005)	Ochsner Park; 43°28′13″N 89°45′21″W	Baraboo	Camelback through truss bridge across the Baraboo River, built in 1884 by Milwaukee Bridge and Iron Works. Moved to a park around 1987. Now the last remaining bridge of this type in the state.
26	Samuel and Nina Marcus House	Samuel and Nina Marcus House	November 16, 2018 (#100003121)	241 E Jefferson St. 43°10′37″N 90°03′57″W	Spring Green	1.5-story Arts and Crafts/Craftsman stucco-clad house with banks of casement windows and wide eaves, designed by Morton Pereira and built in 1921. The Marcuses owned department stores, including Nina's in Spring Green.
27	Marshall Memorial Hall	Marshall Memorial Hall	April 1, 1993 (#93000264)	30 Wisconsin Dells Parkway S. 43°35′20″N 89°47′37″W	Lake Delton	Small Georgian Revival municipal building built in 1928 with a bequest from Roujet D. Marshall, a Wisconsin Supreme Court justice from the area. The building houses a library, offices and a meeting room.
28	Merrimac Ferry	Merrimac Ferry	December 31, 1974 (#74000330)	WI 113 at the Wisconsin River; 43°22′05″N 89°37′26″W	Merrimac	Car ferry across the Wisconsin River. Ferries have operated at this site since 1844.
29	Freda Meyers Nishan Memorial Chapel	Freda Meyers Nishan Memorial Chapel	June 7, 2019 (#100004016)	1000 Myrtle St. 43°32′32″N 90°00′10″W	Reedsburg	Neogothic Revival-styled funeral chapel in Greenwood Cemetery, designed by Leigh Hunt and built in 1940. Then used to store bodies when the ground was too frozen for digging.
30	Our Lady of Loretto Roman Catholic Church and Cemetery	Our Lady of Loretto Roman Catholic Church and Cemetery	March 9, 1990 (#90000378)	Co. Hwy. C, 1 mi. W of Denzer; 43°21′03″N 89°54′17″W	Honey Creek	Gothic Revival church built in 1880 as a mission church for German and Irish settlers. Includes original pews, 1887 pump organ and pot-bellied stove.
31	Park Street Historic District	Park Street Historic District	December 26, 1984 (#84000656)	On N. Park St. roughly bounded by 6th, Locust, N. Pine and Main Sts. 43°32′04″N 90°00′20″W	Reedsburg	Largely residential district, with homes in various styles built as early as 1870.
32	Ralph P. Perry House	Ralph P. Perry House	March 29, 2022 (#84004019)	531 East Main St. 43°31′58″N 90°00′11″W	Reedsburg	2.5-story Georgian Revival home built in 1908, with a 2-story front portico supported by colossal columns and a porte-cochère.
33	Seth Peterson Cottage	Seth Peterson Cottage	November 9, 1981 (#81000059)	Dell Ave. 43°33′47″N 89°49′30″W	Lake Delton	Small modernist cottage built in 1958, overlooking Mirror Lake. Frank Lloyd Wright's last building in Wisconsin. Now available for rental and tours.
34	Point of Rocks	Point of Rocks	June 11, 2010 (#10000345)	US-12 approximately .85 mi north of Ski Hi Rd. and .25 mi south of STH 159; 43°26′09″N 89°46′22″W	Baraboo (town)	Outcrop of Baraboo quartzite. From this and other area outcrops, UW-Madison geologists developed theories on metamorphism, Pre-Cambrian and structural geology.
35	Walworth D. Porter Duplex Residence	Walworth D. Porter Duplex Residence	September 27, 1996 (#96001053)	221-225 7th St. 43°28′27″N 89°44′22″W	Baraboo	Queen Anne duplex built in 1894. Once occupied by Charles Ringling.
36	Raddatz Rockshelter	Raddatz Rockshelter	December 18, 1978 (#78000139)	On CTH C at Natural Bridge State Park; 43°20′53″N 89°55′53″W	Leland	Oldest documented site of human occupation in the upper Midwest, dated to 10,000 to 12,000 years ago.
37	Reedsburg Brewery	Reedsburg Brewery	December 26, 1984 (#84000661)	401 N. Walnut St. 43°32′09″N 90°00′30″W	Reedsburg	A brewery started at this site in 1870, using locally-grown hops. It burned in 1903, was rebuilt in 1905 with 8,000 barrel capacity, and ran until 1950, except during Prohibition. Now apartments.
38	Reedsburg Post Office	Reedsburg Post Office	October 24, 2000 (#00001240)	215 N. Walnut St. 43°32′01″N 90°00′30″W	Reedsburg	Built in 1937, the post office contains a mural "Dairy Farming," painted by Richard Jansen and funded by a New Deal program.
39	Reedsburg Woolen Mill Office	Reedsburg Woolen Mill Office	December 26, 1984 (#84000664)	26 Main St. 43°31′56″N 90°00′40″W	Reedsburg	The mill converted local wool into products from army blankets to commercial goods for Montgomery Ward and Sears. With 200 employees, it was Reedsburg's largest employer for much of its 80 years, from around 1881 to 1967.
40	Rest Haven Motel	Rest Haven Motel	July 20, 2011 (#11000478)	E5116 US 14; 43°11′08″N 90°03′47″W	Spring Green	1952 motel designed by Jesse Caraway, a student of Frank Lloyd Wright. Now the Usonian Inn
41	William Riggert House	William Riggert House	December 26, 1984 (#84000666)	547 S. Park St. 43°31′35″N 90°00′22″W	Reedsburg	Riggert, a banker and city leader, had this Queen Anne house built in 1892. It still has a carriage house.
42	Ringling Brothers Circus Headquarters	Ringling Brothers Circus Headquarters	August 4, 1969 (#69000032)	Bounded roughly by Water, Brian, Lynn, and East Sts. 43°28′02″N 89°44′21″W	Baraboo	Winter quarters for the Ringling Brothers Circus from 1884 to 1919, including the Ring Barn for horses and the Elephant House. Now part of Circus World Museum.
43	Al. Ringling Theatre	Al. Ringling Theatre	May 17, 1976 (#76000202)	136 4th Ave. 43°28′16″N 89°44′37″W	Baraboo	The eldest Ringling brother gave this gift to Baraboo in 1915, an ornate Beaux Arts theater which was one of the first "movie palaces" in the U.S.
44	Albrecht C. Ringling House	Albrecht C. Ringling House	May 17, 1976 (#76000079)	623 Broadway; 43°28′25″N 89°44′41″W	Baraboo	1905 Romanesque Revival home of Albrecht and Lou Ringling of the Ringling Brothers Circus. Al was the "circus genius" and Lou started as the snake charmer.
45	Charles Ringling House	Charles Ringling House	March 21, 1997 (#97000268)	201 8th St. 43°28′30″N 89°44′24″W	Baraboo	Neoclassical-styled home built in 1900 of Charles Ringling, operating manager of the Ringling Brothers Circus.
46	Charles and Anna Ruhland House	Charles and Anna Ruhland House	March 20, 2017 (#100000774)	213 Lynn St. 43°27′55″N 89°44′30″W	Baraboo	Two-story brick Craftsman house, built in 1909. Charles ran a nearby brewery with his father.
47	Salem Evangelical Church	Salem Evangelical Church	March 29, 1988 (#86003576)	Jct. of CR PF and Church Rd. 43°17′59″N 89°50′30″W	Plain	Church of block and stack masonry built in 1875. The congregation formed at the site in 1844 was the focus of the Swiss community. A.k.a. Ragatz Church.
48	Sauk City Fire Station	Sauk City Fire Station	July 28, 1999 (#99000920)	717 John Adams St. 43°16′14″N 89°43′23″W	Sauk City	Firehouse built in 1889, with hose-drying tower added in 1894. Also served as village hall. The volunteer fire department had organized in 1854, the first in the state.
49	Sauk City High School	Sauk City High School	February 23, 1989 (#89000071)	713 Madison St. 43°16′22″N 89°43′33″W	Sauk City	1916 brick building designed by Alfred Clas in Mission style.
50	Sauk County Courthouse	Sauk County Courthouse	March 9, 1982 (#82000711)	515 Oak St. 43°28′13″N 89°44′35″W	Baraboo	1905 Classical Revival building designed by Ferry and native-son Clas and built in 1905.
51	Seven Gables	Seven Gables	January 20, 1978 (#78000140)	215 6th St. 43°28′23″N 89°44′23″W	Baraboo	Carpenter Gothic home built in 1860 for Terrell Thomas, a Baraboo banker.
52	Simonds 10-Sided Barn	Simonds 10-Sided Barn	April 14, 2020 (#100005183)	S4680 Rocky Point Rd. 43°28′30″N 89°41′43″W	Greenfield	Round-ish barn with timber frame and board-and-batten exterior, designed by Otto and Orville Kramer and built in 1916.
53	Spellman Granite Works	Spellman Granite Works	July 14, 2015 (#15000426)	615 Phillips Blvd. 43°16′19″N 89°43′44″W	Sauk City	The Spellman brothers ran a stone-finishing business that produced gravestones, urns and statuary from 1917 to 2005.
54	State Bank of Spring Green	State Bank of Spring Green	July 16, 2010 (#10000463)	134 W. Jefferson St. 43°10′36″N 90°04′08″W	Spring Green	1915 Neoclassical Revival building with terra cotta ornamentation, designed by William Hilgen.
55	Steam Locomotive #1385	Steam Locomotive #1385	May 18, 2000 (#00000524)	E8948 Diamond Hill Rd. 43°27′31″N 89°52′29″W	North Freedom	Built in 1907, #1385 is the only remaining operable steam locomotive of the Chicago & North Western Railway.
56	William Stolte, Jr., House	William Stolte, Jr., House	December 26, 1984 (#84000667)	432 S. Walnut St. 43°31′44″N 90°00′30″W	Reedsburg	Queen Anne house built 1899. Stolte Jr. was a partner in the Big Store and was active in civic life and the local Old Settlers Association.
57	William Stolte, Sr., House	William Stolte, Sr., House	December 26, 1984 (#84000670)	444 S. Walnut St. 43°31′43″N 90°00′30″W	Reedsburg	Stolte Sr. built the house in the 1880s, mixing the styles of Victorian Gothic and Queen Anne. A smokehouse and hitching post are in the back yard. Stolte built the hotel at 204 Main.
58	Thompson House Hotel	Thompson House Hotel	December 22, 1997 (#97001583)	200 Ash St. 43°28′02″N 89°44′24″W	Baraboo	Semi-Italianate hotel built around 1890(?) near the C&NW depot. Later housed the City Hotel, Wilder's Tavern, and a rooming house.
59	Tripp Memorial Library and Hall	Tripp Memorial Library and Hall	September 14, 1981 (#81000060)	565 Water St. 43°17′29″N 89°43′17″W	Prairie du Sac	J. S. Tripp, a local banker, lawyer and public servant, donated funds to build a library and village hall. William Dresen and Alfred C. Clas designed it in Neoclassical style and it opened in 1913.
60	A.G. Tuttle Estate	A.G. Tuttle Estate	November 6, 1980 (#80000194)	N. Elizabeth St. 43°29′00″N 89°43′59″W	Baraboo	Gothic revival house built in 1869. Tuttle started a fruit tree orchard in 1853.
61	Van Hise Rock	Van Hise Rock	September 25, 1997 (#97001267)	WI 136, 0.75 mi. N of WI 154; 43°29′22″N 89°54′55″W	Rock Springs	Roadside outcrop of quartzite which shows cross-bedding. UW-Madison geologist Charles Van Hise used this outcrop and others to interpret the Precambrian rock of the Baraboo district.
62	Jacob Van Orden House	Jacob Van Orden House	September 6, 1996 (#96000988)	531 4th Ave. 43°28′15″N 89°45′06″W	Baraboo	Tudor Revival house designed by Ferry & Clas and built in 1903. Van Orden had worked his way up from "general utility boy" to president of the First National Bank of Baraboo. Now houses the Sauk County Historical Museum.

== See also ==
- List of National Historic Landmarks in Wisconsin
- National Register of Historic Places listings in Wisconsin
- Listings in neighboring counties: Adams, Columbia, Dane, Iowa, Juneau, Richland, Vernon
