= Point of Rocks (Baraboo, Wisconsin) =

- U.S. National Register of Historic Places
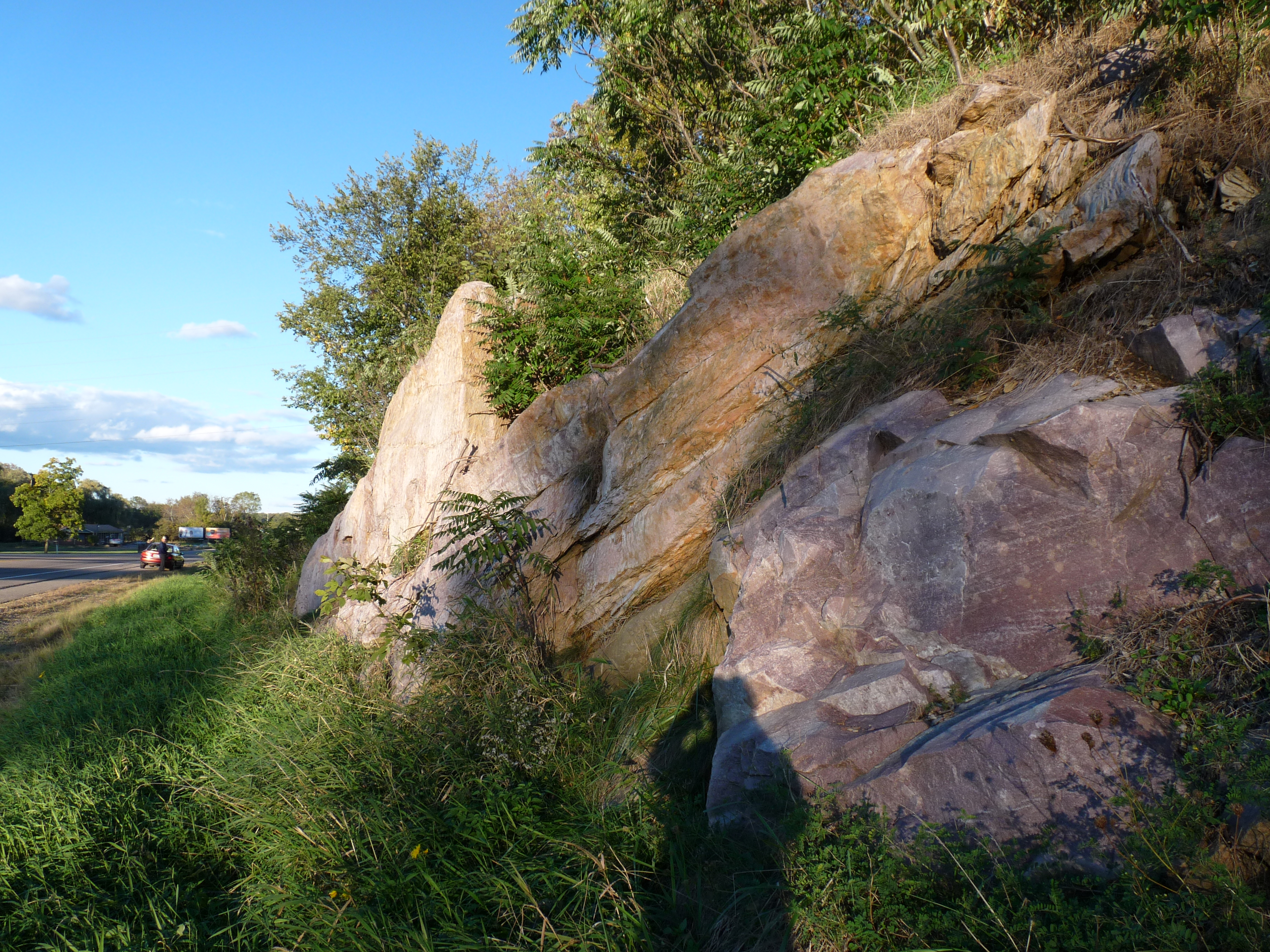
- Point of Rocks, September 2012

- Location within Wisconsin Location within the United States
- Location: US 12 approximately 0.85 mi (1.37 km) north of Ski Hi Road and 0.25 mi (0.40 km) south of WIS 159
- Coordinates: 43°25′57.7632″N 89°46′32.1852″W
- NRHP reference No.: 10000345
- Added to NRHP: June 11, 2010

Point of Rocks is a geologically significant outcropping located along U.S. Route 12 (US 12) in the Town of Baraboo in Sauk County, Wisconsin, United States, southwest of the city of Baraboo. The formation is made up of Baraboo Quartzite and is part of the Baraboo Range; it dates from the Precambrian and is roughly 1.7 billion years old. Along with the nearby Van Hise Rock, the formation was instrumental in the University of Wisconsin–Madison's development of the field of geology in the late 19th and early 20th centuries. The formation is listed on the National Register of Historic Places.

== Description ==
Point of Rocks is located along the east side of a curve in US 12, 0.25 miles (0.40 km) south of its intersection with Wisconsin Highway 159. The outcropping itself is around 4,000 feet (1,200 m) thick and consists of maroon, pink, and purple quartzite, while the surrounding area is covered by trees. The formation was created roughly 1.7 billion years ago and, as part of the Baraboo Range, is a remnant of a Precambrian mountain range. The rocks feature ripple patterns created by waves and tides, indicating that the surrounding area was once flooded by a sea. Geological concepts exhibited by the outcropping include stratification and structural deformation; the formation is often used as an illustrative example of the latter for geology students.

== Modern history ==
Point of Rocks, Van Hise Rock, and a number of other nearby geological features played an important role in the development of the field of geology by the University of Wisconsin–Madison. Prior to the late 19th century, geology was largely considered a descriptive field and focused primarily on surveys used to locate mineral resources. UW–Madison geologist Roland Irving was the first to focus his studies on the Baraboo Range, beginning through his work on an 1873 survey of the area. His student and eventual fellow faculty member Charles Van Hise continued his work, in which he was later joined by Charles Leith and Warren Mead. These geologists' studies of the exposed rock formations in the Baraboo Range led to advancements in the theory of how rock behaves when stressed, pioneering the field of structural geology. In addition, their work helped transform geology from a descriptive science to a theoretical one.

The formation was added to the National Register of Historic Places on June 11, 2010.

== See also ==
- National Register of Historic Places listings in Sauk County, Wisconsin
