= Ableman's Gorge State Natural Area =

Preserve in Wisconsin, USA

- IUCN category V (protected landscape/seascape)
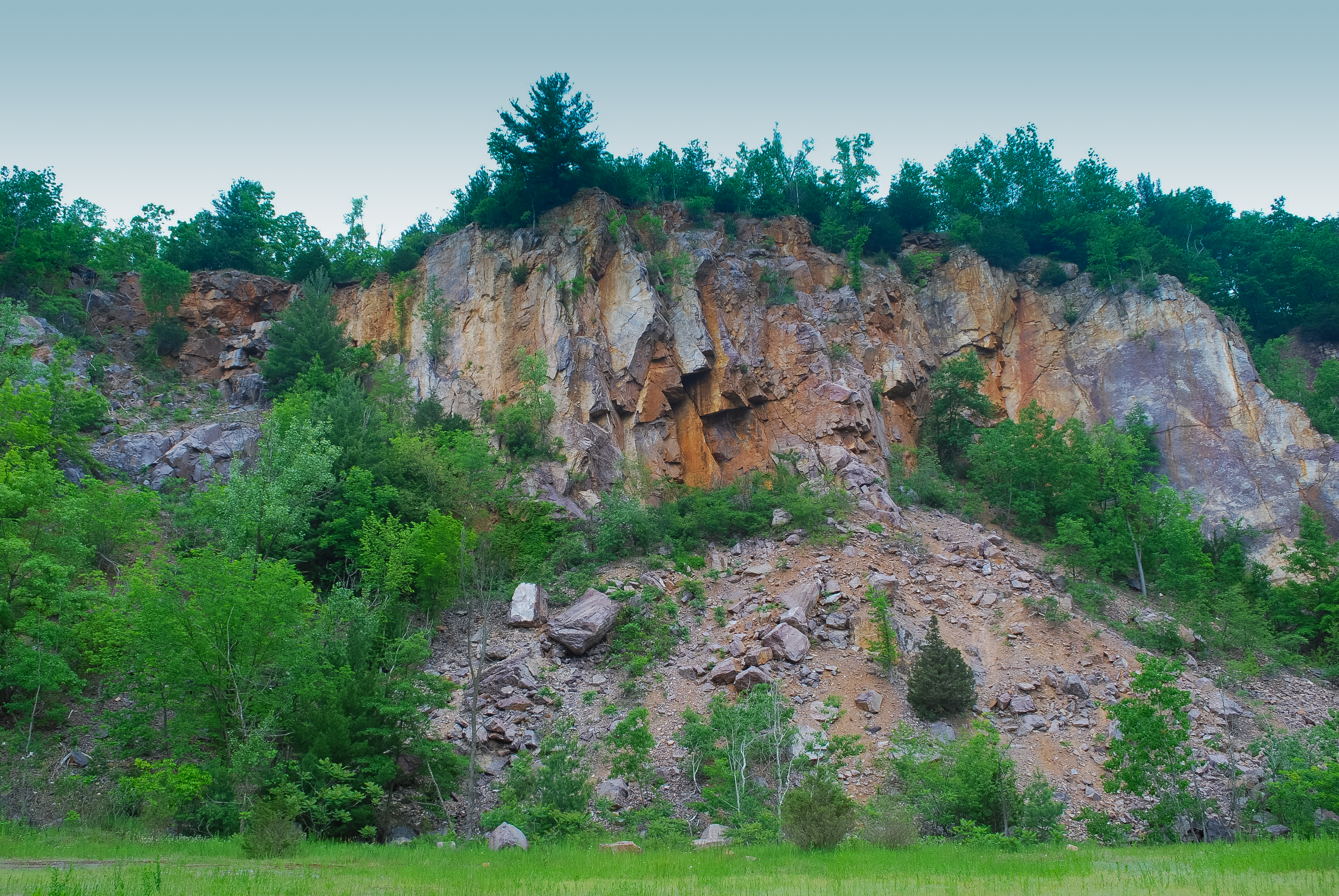
- Ableman's Gorge in 2009

- Location within Wisconsin Location within the United States
- Location: Sauk County, Wisconsin
- Nearest city: Rock Springs, Wisconsin
- Coordinates: 43°29′18″N 89°55′17″W
- Area: 127 acres (51 ha)
- Established: 1969
- Governing body: Wisconsin Department of Natural Resources and the University of Wisconsin

Ableman's Gorge is a 127 acres (51 ha) Wisconsin State Natural Area located near Rock Springs, Wisconsin. This 200 to 400-foot wide and 200-foot high gorge is cut by about 1 mile (1.6 km) of the Baraboo River in an "L" shape. The Natural Area is named after Stephen Van Rensselaer Ableman, who settled Rock Springs in 1851 and named the community after the gorge area.

== Formation ==
The cliffs are composed of Baraboo Quartzite below Cambrian sandstone and conglomerate. The gorge formed along a layer of ancient sea sediment that hardened into sandstone then metamorphized into harder quartzite rock before being lifted into a vertical layer. The area was later submerged under the sea again, which led to another sandstone layer capping the quartzite. The unique geological features of this gorge make it one of a few places where this type of rock can clearly be seen in the Midwestern United States. The gorge has a cooler climate than the surrounding areas, resulting in vegetation commonly found in northern Wisconsin. It was designated to the State Natural Area program in 1969.

== Use ==
The gorge was used by University of Wisconsin-Madison geology students for research. Students and visitors had difficult-level hiking to reach the gorge. After it was named a State Natural Area, it was owned by the Wisconsin Department of Natural Resources (WDNR). Local residents petitioned the WDNR for permission to build a trail on an abandoned rail line in 2005. The trail was built and had opened by 2014. The easy-level trail to reach the gorge and a half mile (1 km) difficult-level trail along the edge. The trail begins at a parking lot on Wisconsin Highway 136 near an artesian well. The Van Hise Rock is located within this gorge and is a prominent feature.
