= Stolte =

Stolte can refer to:

- 11508 Stolte, a main-belt asteroid discovered on October 12, 1990
- Adele Stolte (1932–2020), German soprano singer in concert and Lieder, and an academic voice teacher
- Anni Stolte (1915–1994), German swimmer
- Dieter Stolte (1934–2023), German journalist and ZDF-intendant
- Christian Stolte (born 1962), American actor
- Richard Stolte (born 1990), Dutch footballer
- Stan Stolte (born 1961), American baseball coach
- William Stolte Jr. House, historic house which was added to the National Register of Historic Places in 1984 along with the Stolte Sr. House
- William Stolte Sr. House
