= Baraboo (disambiguation) =

Baraboo, Wisconsin is a city in and the county seat of Sauk County, Wisconsin.

Baraboo may also refer to:

- Baraboo (town), Wisconsin, a town that includes most of the city
- Baraboo-Wisconsin Dells Airport, an airport in the city
- Baraboo Quartzite, a geological formation near the city
- Baraboo Range, a monadnock in Wisconsin
- Baraboo River, a tributary of the Wisconsin River
- Baraboo (film), a 2009 drama directed by Mary Sweeney
- Project Baraboo, Microsoft HoloLens, a pair of smartglasses developed by Microsoft

== See also ==
- University of Wisconsin–Baraboo/Sauk County
- West Baraboo, Wisconsin
