= Wisconsin Highway 123 =

State highway in Wisconsin, United States

State Trunk Highway 123

Route information
- Maintained by WisDOT
- Length: 3.00 mi (4.83 km)
- Existed: 1919–June 2016

Major junctions
- South end: CTH-DL in Baraboo
- North end: WIS 33 / WIS 113 in Baraboo

Location
- Country: United States
- State: Wisconsin
- Counties: Sauk

Highway system
- Wisconsin State Trunk Highway System; Interstate; US; State; Scenic; Rustic
← WIS 122	→ WIS 124

State Trunk Highway 123 (often called Highway 123, STH-123 or WIS 123) is a former short state highway in the U.S. state of Wisconsin. It ran north–south in south central Wisconsin from the entrance to Devil's Lake State Park to Baraboo. It was phased out in June 2016 and turned over to local jurisdictions and County DL was extended.

== Route description ==
Starting at the entrance of Devil's Lake State Park, WIS 123 briefly traveled northeastward. Then, after it began to travel northward, it intersected WIS 159 (now WIS 136). It continued to travel northward towards downtown Baraboo via present-day CTH-DL, Walnut Street, and Parkway. Then, it began to run concurrently with Bus. US 12 for the rest of the route. After that, they ran along South Boulevard for a short distance. After crossing above the Baraboo River, they began to run concurrently with WIS 113. The three then continued north as Broadway before all but Bus. US 12 ended at WIS 33.

== History ==
In 1919, WIS 123 was established to travel from Devil's Lake State Park to WIS 12 (now Bus. US 12) in Baraboo. In 1936, WIS 123 was extended north to WIS 33 via a former portion of US 12. This was done in response to US 12 being moved westward onto a 1936-era bypass.

Up until 2016, no significant changes had occurred. Then, in April 2016, WIS 123 began to be in the process of refurbishment. The route was later decommissioned in June 2016 as part of the project. Today, the former route outside of Baraboo was then superseded by CTH-DL.

== Major intersections ==
The entire route is in Sauk County.

Location	mi	km	Destinations	Notes
Town of Baraboo			CTH-DL	Devil's Lake State Park entrance
Town of Baraboo			WIS 159 – Sauk City	
Baraboo			Bus. US 12 east (South Boulevard)	Southern end of US 12 Business overlap
Baraboo			WIS 113 south	Southern end of WIS 113 overlap
Baraboo			Bus. US 12 west / WIS 33 (8th Avenue) / WIS 113 ends	Northern ends of US 12 Business and WIS 113 overlaps
1.000 mi = 1.609 km; 1.000 km = 0.621 mi: Concurrency terminus
