= Point of Rocks =

Point of Rocks may refer to:

In the United States (sorted by state):

- Point of Rocks (Kern County, California), a mountain range in Kern County
- Point of Rocks (San Bernardino County, California), a promontory overlooking the Mojave River in San Bernardino County, California
- Point of Rocks (Kansas), a promontory landmark on the Santa Fe Trail
- Point of Rocks, Maryland, a town on the Potomac River
- Point of Rocks (MARC station), listed on the National Register of Historic Places (NRHP) in Frederick County, Maryland
- Point of Rocks Historic District, a promontory landmark on the Santa Fe Trail, listed on the NRHP in Colfax County, New Mexico
- Point of Rocks (Sierra County, New Mexico), landmark along the Jornada del Muerto
- Point of Rocks (Chester, Virginia), listed on the NRHP in Chesterfield County, Virginia
- Point of Rocks (Texas), an isolated hill with a spring, a watering place on the San Antonio - El Paso Road, 10 miles west of Fort Davis, Texas, now a roadside park
- Point of Rocks (Baraboo, Wisconsin), a rock formation on the NRHP
- Point of Rocks, Wyoming, an unincorporated community in Sweetwater County
- Point of Rocks Stage Station, listed on the NRHP in Sweetwater County, Wyoming
