= Man Mound =

- U.S. National Register of Historic Places
- U.S. National Historic Landmark
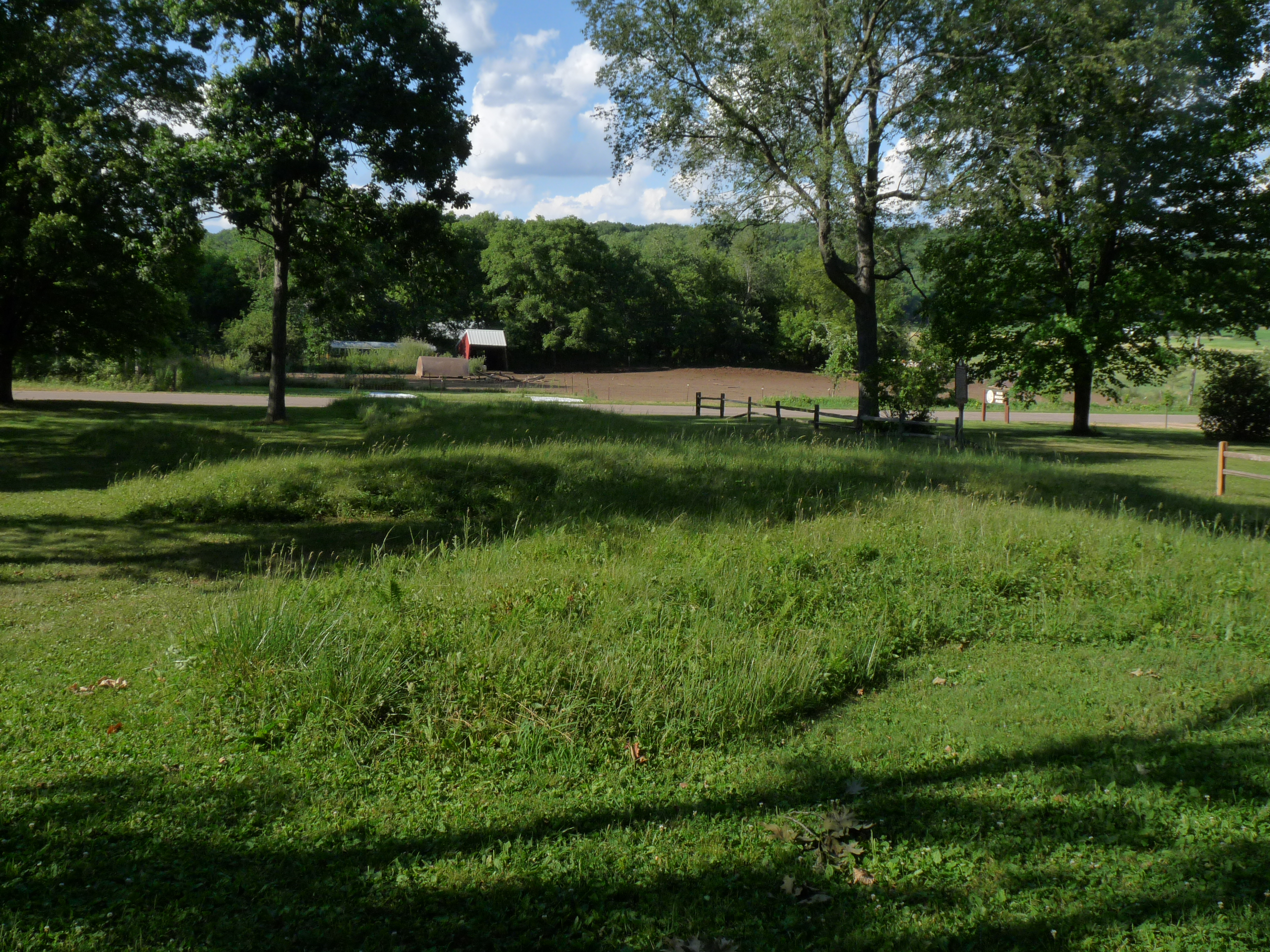
- Looking down at the mound from the headdress

- Location within Wisconsin Location within the United States
- Interactive map showing the location of Man Mound
- Location: E13097 Man Mound Rd Baraboo, Wisconsin
- Coordinates: 43°29′19″N 89°40′15″W
- Area: 0.3 acres (0.12 ha)
- NRHP reference No.: 78000138, 16000861

Significant dates
- Added to NRHP: November 30, 1978
- Designated NHL: October 31, 2016

The Man Mound is a precontact earthwork of a humanoid figure located in Greenfield, Sauk County, Wisconsin, east of the city of Baraboo. Constructed during the Late Woodland period, the mound is the only surviving anthropomorphic effigy mound in North America. The mound depicts a humanoid figure with horns or a horned headdress and may have held religious or ceremonial significance to its builders. The mound was preserved as a county park in 1908, listed on the National Register of Historic Places in 1978 and designated a National Historic Landmark in 2016.

== Description ==
The mound is a large humanoid figure, with its head to the south and its feet originally pointed westward. The figure's head features two horns, which may have been part of a headdress. When it was built, the figure was 214 feet (65 m) long and raised 2.5 feet (0.76 m) from the ground. The legs and feet of the figure were destroyed by the construction of Man Mound Road and a cow pasture across the road, leaving the modern mound roughly 50 feet (15 m) shorter than its original length. The legs have since been repainted across the road, and plastic cutouts of the feet were added to the cow pasture.

The mound is one of five anthropomorphic effigy mounds known to exist in North America, all of which were found in Wisconsin, and is the only one that still stands. The other mounds included the La Valle Man Mound, also in Sauk County, and the Eagle Township Man Mound and Twin Man Mounds in neighboring Richland County. A small number of other possible humanoid mounds have been noted, all of them also in southern Wisconsin, though none of these have been confirmed.

== History ==
The mound was built between 750 and 1200 AD by Late Woodland peoples. It was part of a tradition of effigy mound building that began in 750 and declined in 1000 to 1200.

These effigy mounds were defined by a central zoomorphic or anthropomorphic mound, often surrounded by smaller geometric mounds. The mounds were often used as burial sites and often held religious significance for their builders; while the Man Mound has not been excavated, it has been hypothesized to be a burial site as well, and the figure it represents may have been a ceremonial leader. As the mound is still relatively intact, it has significant potential to shed light on the religious and cultural significance of effigy mounds in Late Woodland culture.

In 1859, William Canfield became the first European settler to identify and survey the mound. His findings generated some interest due to several ongoing surveys of Wisconsin mounds, but the mound faded from Western academic attention in the late 19th century. After two of its archaeologists rediscovered the mound, the Wisconsin Archaeological Society worked with the Sauk County Historical Society to purchase the site in 1907. The following year, the two societies designated the mound as a county park to ensure its continued preservation. The mound was added to the National Register of Historic Places on November 30, 1978, and designated as a National Historic Landmark on October 31, 2016.

== See also ==
- List of National Historic Landmarks in Wisconsin
- National Register of Historic Places listings in Sauk County, Wisconsin
