= Van Hise Rock =

- U.S. National Register of Historic Places
- U.S. National Historic Landmark
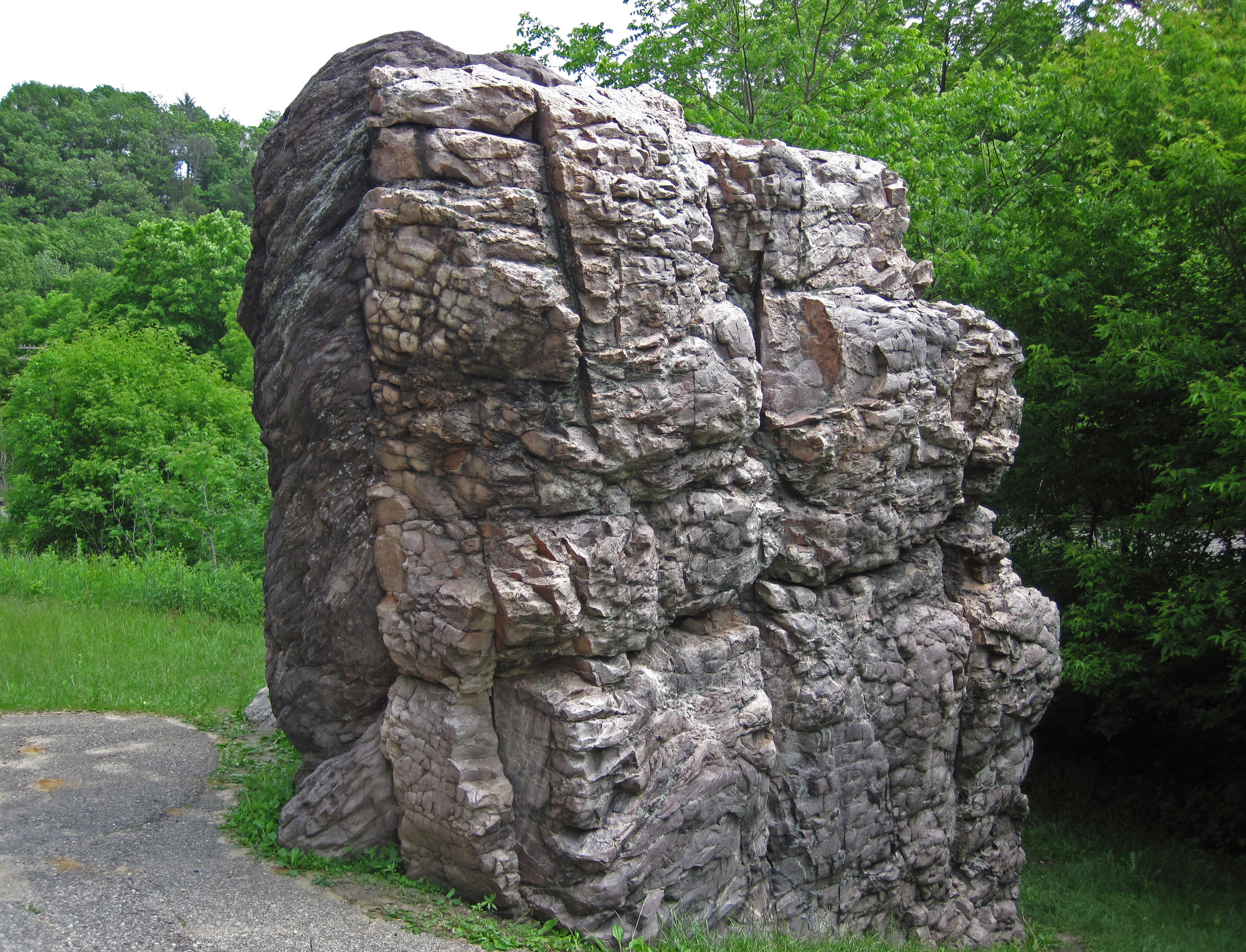
- Van Hise Rock in 2015

- Location within Wisconsin Location within the United States
- Interactive map showing the location of Van Hise Rock
- Location: Sauk County, Wisconsin, USA
- Nearest city: Rock Springs, Wisconsin
- Coordinates: 43°29′21.67″N 89°54′55.13″W
- NRHP reference No.: 97001267

Significant dates
- Added to NRHP: September 25, 1997
- Designated NHL: September 25, 1997

Van Hise Rock is a rock monolith located along Wisconsin Highway 136 near Rock Springs, Wisconsin. The rock is a geologically significant outcropping of Baraboo Quartzite.

It serves as a monument to Charles Van Hise, a prominent Wisconsin geologist who studied the area extensively. The rock was declared a National Historic Landmark in 1997.

== Description ==
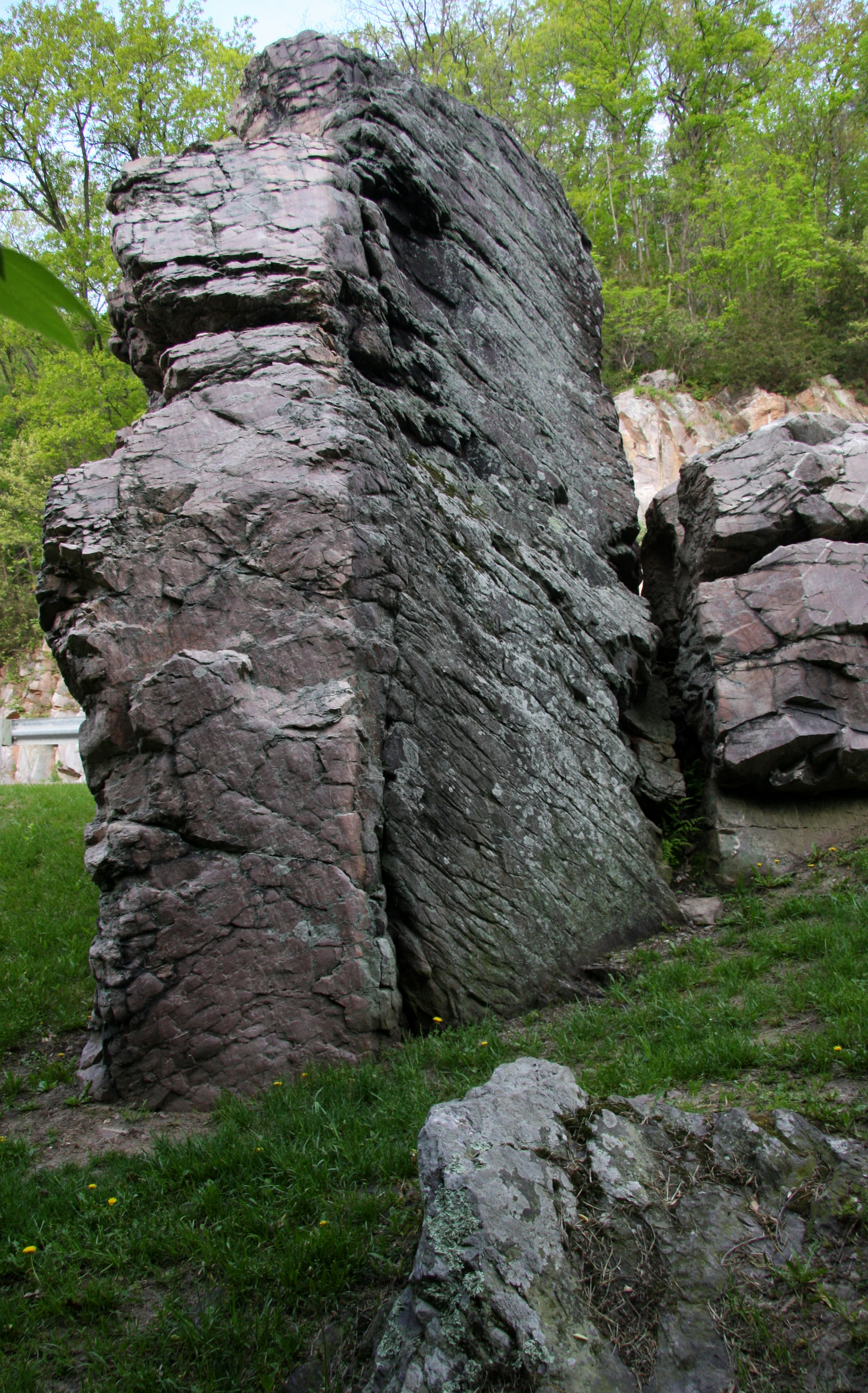
The rock seen from below

Van Hise Rock is made of Baraboo quartzite, a type of pink-purple quartzite found in south central Wisconsin. It is one of the best-exposed parts of the Baraboo Range, a ring of quartzite hills that passes through Columbia and Sauk Counties. The quartzite in the range was formed as sandstone during the Precambrian Supereon; then a greenschist phase changed it to quartzite.

The monolith is located in a wayside on Wisconsin Highway 136, about 3/4 mile north of the intersection with Wisconsin Highway 154 near the village of Rock Springs. The wayside provides visitor access to the rock.

== History ==
The rock is named in honor of Charles Van Hise, a prominent geologist who chaired the University of Wisconsin Department of Mineralogy and Geology. Among his significant accomplishments in geology and politics, Van Hise determined how the quartzite in the Baraboo Range had formed. Building on earlier discoveries that the quartzite formed in the Precambrian Era and had metamorphosed, Van Hise was able to determine the forces that deformed the rock; his discoveries helped form the key principles of structural geology. Van Hise also used his studies of the quartzite's conversion from sandstone to write the Treatise on Metamorphism in 1904, the first publication to describe the process of metamorphism in detail. University of Wisconsin geologists used Van Hise Rock to demonstrate the properties and principles which Van Hise discovered; the rock is still used in geological education and research.

== See also ==
- List of National Historic Landmarks in Wisconsin
- National Register of Historic Places listings in Sauk County, Wisconsin
