= Rest Haven Motel =

- U.S. National Register of Historic Places
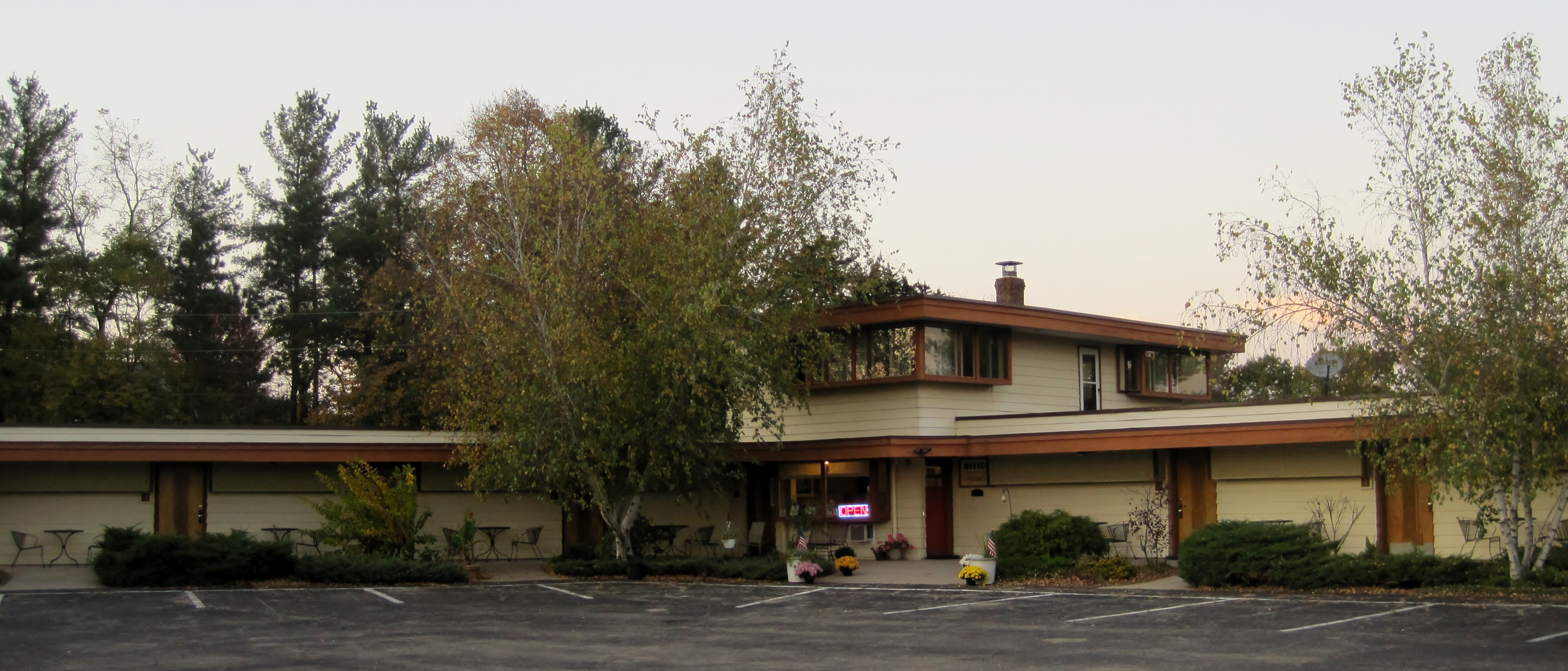

- Location within Wisconsin
- Location: E5116 US 14, Spring Green, Wisconsin
- Coordinates: 43°11′08″N 90°03′47″W
- Area: 1.8 acres (0.73 ha)
- Built: 1951-52
- Built by: Kraemer Bros.
- Architect: Jesse C. Caraway
- Architectural style: Modern Movement
- NRHP reference No.: 11000478
- Added to NRHP: July 20, 2011

The Rest Haven Motel, also known as the Usonian Inn, is a historic motel at E5116 U.S. Highway 14 in Spring Green, Wisconsin. Mr. and Mrs. John Michels opened the motel in 1952 to serve travelers on the new route of U.S. 14, which was realigned to bypass downtown Spring Green in 1944. Architect Jesse C. Caraway, a member of Frank Lloyd Wright's Taliesin Fellowship, designed the motel according to Wright's Usonian principles. The hotel has a two-story central core, which contains its office and owner's residence, and two one-story wings of rooms with low cantilevered canopy roofs, reflecting the typical pattern of Usonian homes. Each room has small, high windows on the side of the building facing the road and larger windows in the rear; this arrangement, which was common to both Wright's work and motel designs of the era, provided lodgers with privacy while giving them a protected view of the motel's natural surroundings. While the hotel has passed through multiple owners, it is still in operation and is a rare intact example of an owner-occupied mid-century motel.

The motel was added to the National Register of Historic Places on July 20, 2011.
