= Samuel and Nina Marcus House =

- U.S. National Register of Historic Places

- Location within Wisconsin
- Location: 241 E. Jefferson St., Spring Green, Wisconsin
- Coordinates: 43°10′37″N 90°03′57″W
- Built: 1921
- Architect: Morton L. Pereira
- Architectural style: American Craftsman
- NRHP reference No.: 100003121
- Added to NRHP: November 16, 2018

The Samuel and Nina Marcus House is a historic house at 241 E. Jefferson Street in Spring Green, Wisconsin. The house was built in 1921 for Samuel Marcus, who managed a branch of his father's department store, and his wife Nina, a Chicago native who moved to Spring Green after marrying Samuel. Architect Morton L. Pereira gave the house an American Craftsman design, a popular early twentieth century style which emphasized simplicity and naturalism. The couple had lived in Los Angeles, where the style was especially popular, before moving to Spring Green; they chose Pereira as the architect due to his family's friendship with Nina's. The one-and-a-half story house features a stucco exterior, a projecting front bay with a recessed arched window, an arched side entrance porch, and a steep gable roof with overhanging eaves and exposed rafter tails. The Marcus family lived in the house until 1927, when financial difficulties caused them to sell the home and move into a converted apartment in the department store. The house is the only full example of the American Craftsman style in Spring Green.

The house was added to the National Register of Historic Places on November 16, 2018.
