= Honey Creek Swiss Rural Historic District =

- U.S. National Register of Historic Places
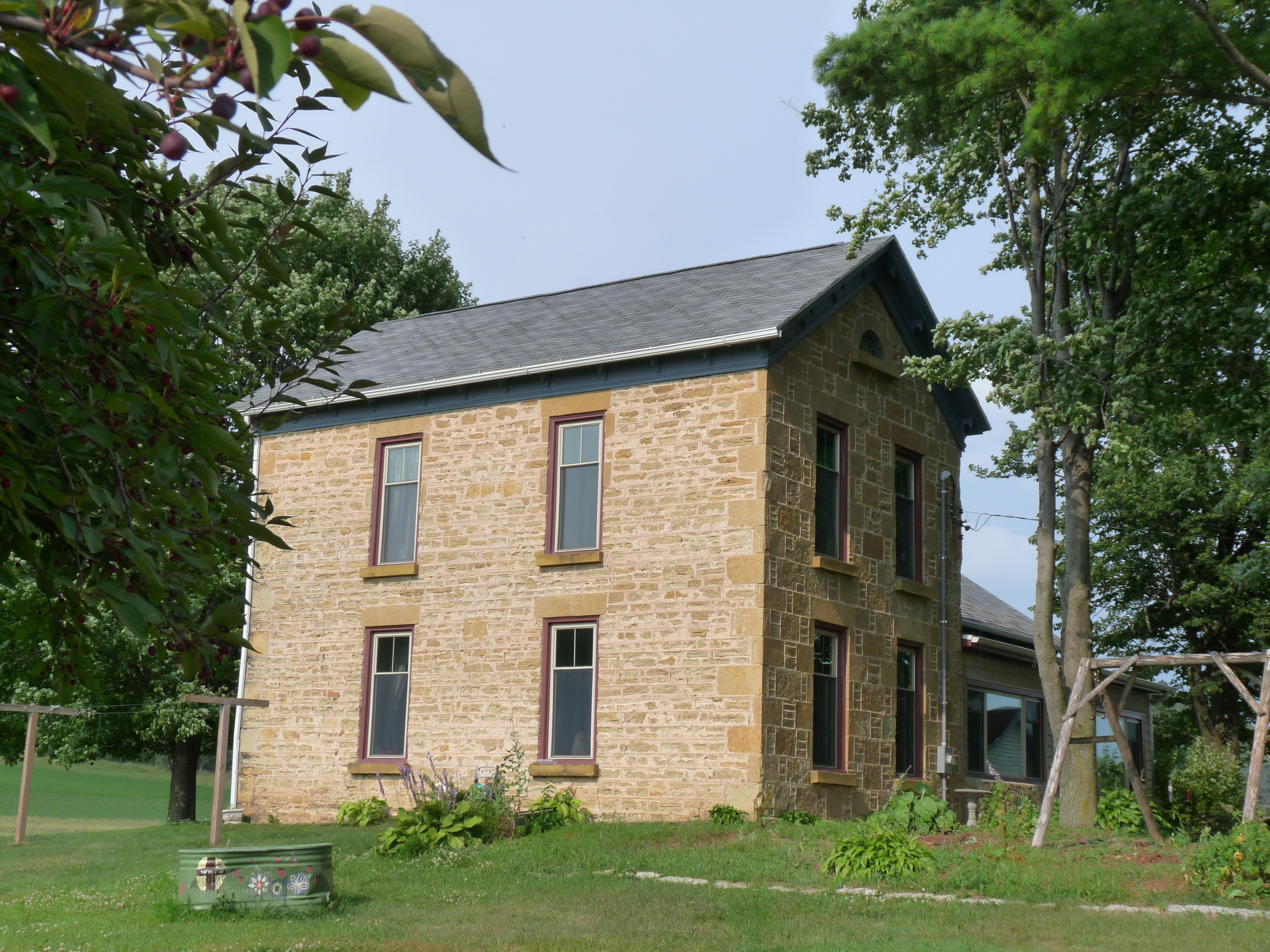

- Location within Wisconsin
- Nearest city: Prairie du Sac, Wisconsin
- Coordinates: 43°18′10″N 89°51′08″W
- Area: 8,380 acres (3,390 ha)
- NRHP reference No.: 89000484
- Added to NRHP: April 6, 1990

The Honey Creek Swiss Rural Historic District is a national historic district in rural Sauk County, Wisconsin. The district encompasses 46 farms over 12 square miles (31 km^{2}) which were settled by Swiss Americans in the 1840s and 1850s. The settlers were Walser people from the canton of Graubünden, and the Honey Creek area remained ethnically homogenous through the end of the nineteenth century. The district includes substantial log and stone houses from the period of early settlement, reflecting the wealth of the new settlers, as well as timber-framed homes within the fachwerk tradition. Later houses in the district reflect contemporary American architectural forms, such as the gable-ell pattern house. The settlers established two churches in the area in the 1850s, one for a German Evangelical congregation and one for a Swiss Reformed congregation; both original church buildings are still standing. The district also includes a variety of barns and agricultural buildings which illustrate the local transition from wheat farming to dairy farming over the nineteenth century.

The district was added to the National Register of Historic Places on April 6, 1990.
