= William Riggert House =

- U.S. National Register of Historic Places
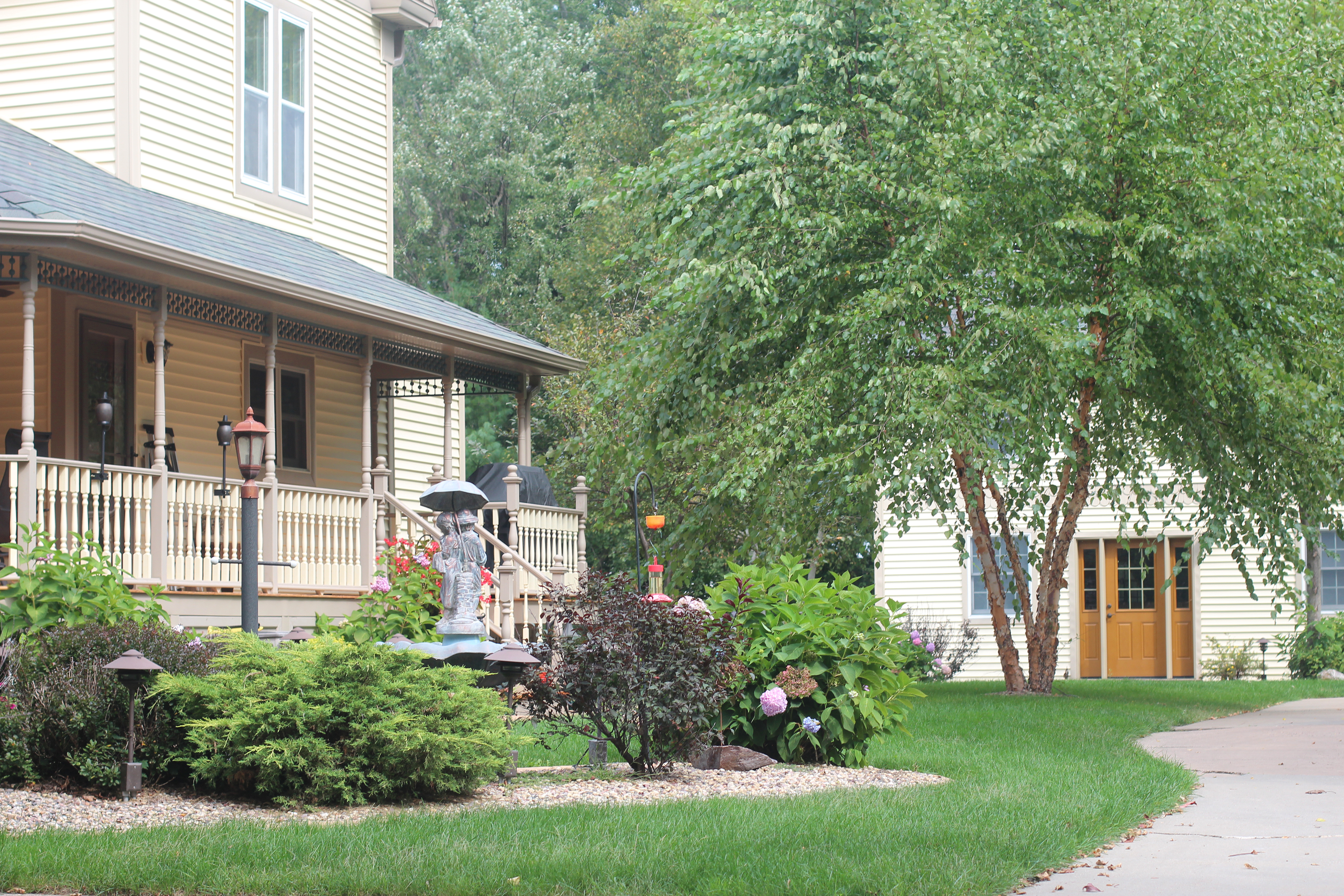

- Location within Wisconsin
- Location: 547 S. Park St., Reedsburg, Wisconsin
- Coordinates: 43°31′35″N 90°00′22″W
- Area: less than one acre
- Built: 1892
- Architect: Willard W. Rork
- Architectural style: Queen Anne
- MPS: Reedsburg MRA
- NRHP reference No.: 84000666
- Added to NRHP: December 26, 1984

The William Riggert House is a historic house at 547 S. Park Street in Reedsburg, Wisconsin. The house was built in 1892 for William Riggert, a Reedsburg banker and merchant. Riggert was also active in local politics, serving as Reedsburg's village president and a member of its city council. Architect Willard W. Rork designed the two-and-a-half story Queen Anne style house. The house's design features a wraparound front porch supported by turned columns, a bay window with ornamental brackets, a small second-story porch above the front entrance, and decorative bargeboard within gables on the west and south sides. The property also includes a two-story carriage house.

The house was added to the National Register of Historic Places on December 26, 1984.
