= J. W. Corwith Livery =

Historic place in Wisconsin, United States

- U.S. National Register of Historic Places
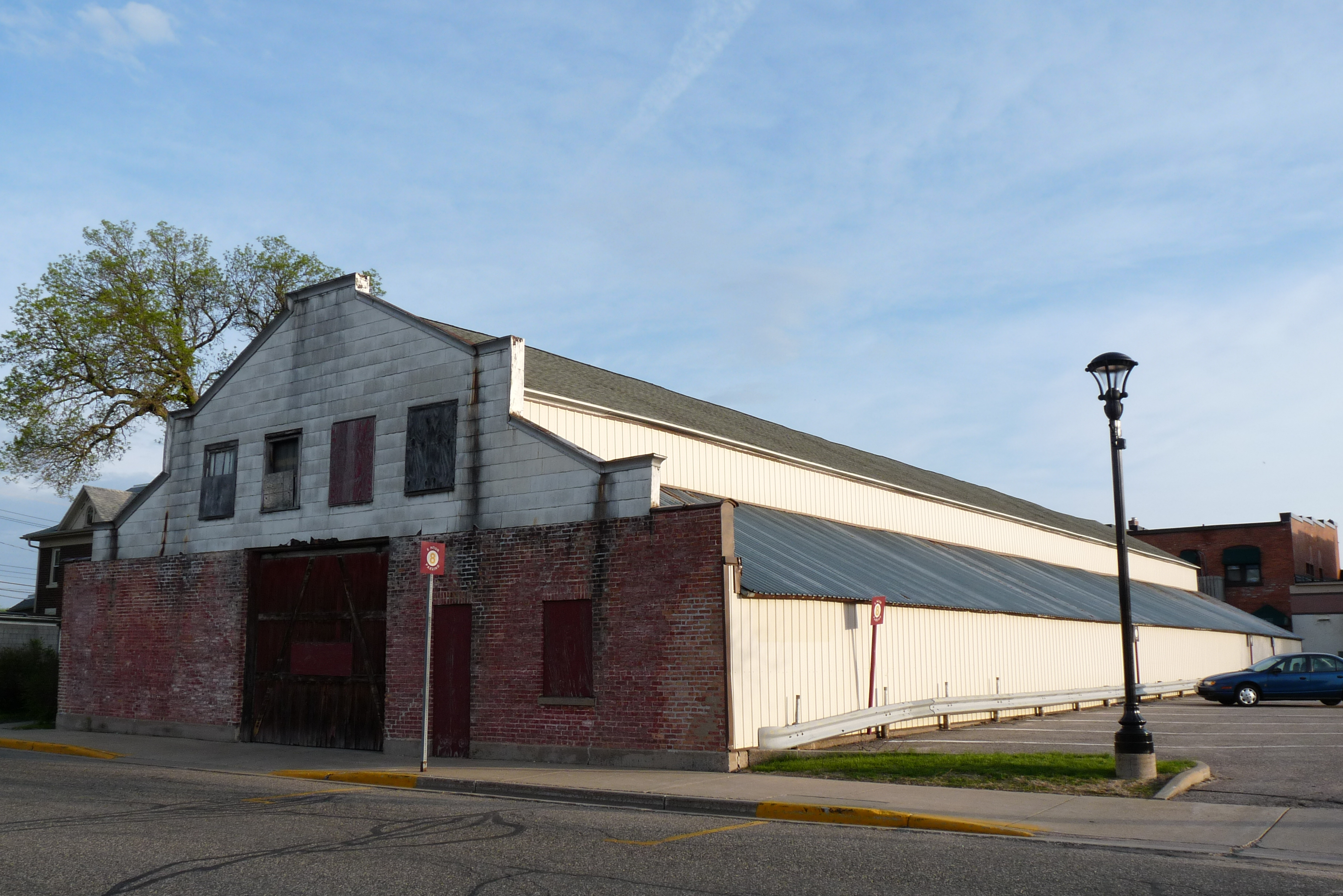

- Location within Wisconsin
- Location: 121 S. Webb Ave., Reedsburg, Wisconsin
- Coordinates: 43°31′54″N 90°00′34″W
- Area: less than one acre
- Built: 1911
- Built by: Johnson Lumber Co.; Sweeney Brothers
- MPS: Reedsburg MRA
- NRHP reference No.: 84004018
- Added to NRHP: April 20, 2004

The J. W. Corwith Livery is a historic livery building at 121 S. Webb Avenue in Reedsburg, Wisconsin. William Corwith built the livery in 1911; at the time it was one of three liveries operating in Reedsburg. The horse and buggy was still a primary means of transportation in the early twentieth century, and liveries both cared for personal horses and provided horses and buggies to transport people who did not own a horse. The one-story brick building included a waiting room, office, carriage room, and stable space for up to 120 horses. As the automobile became more popular, the livery transitioned to providing horses for private events and pleasure riding, and like many liveries it eventually became an auto garage as well.

The building was added to the National Register of Historic Places on April 20, 2004.
