= State Bank of Spring Green =

- U.S. National Register of Historic Places
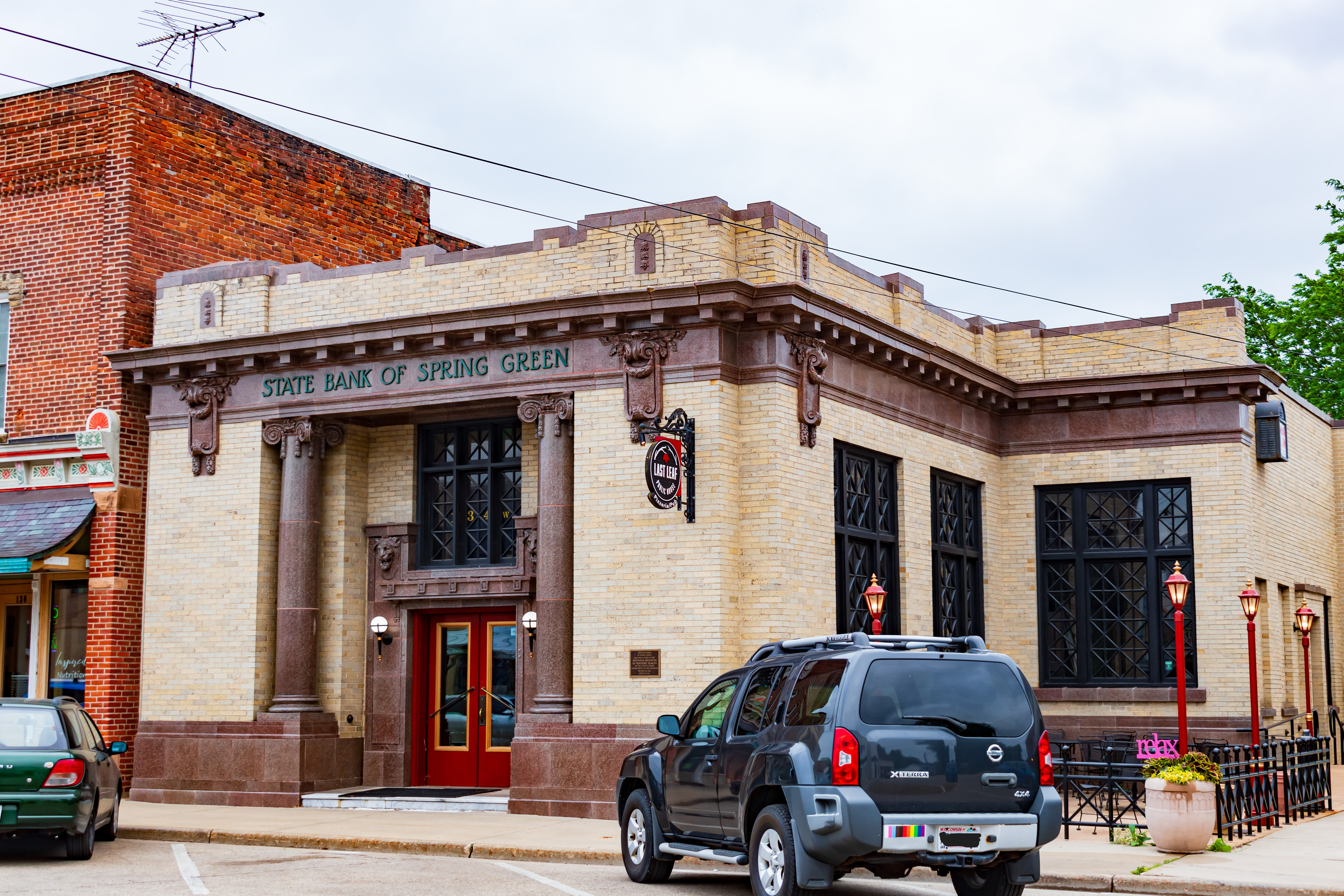

- Location within Wisconsin
- Location: 134 W. Jefferson St., Spring Green, Wisconsin
- Coordinates: 43°10′36″N 90°04′08″W
- Area: less than one acre
- Built: 1914-15
- Architect: William F. Hilgen, Frank L. Ludwig
- Architectural style: Neoclassical
- NRHP reference No.: 10000463
- Added to NRHP: July 16, 2010

The State Bank of Spring Green is a historic bank building at 134 W. Jefferson Street in Spring Green, Wisconsin. The building was constructed in 1914–15 to house the bank of the same name, which was founded in 1900; at the time, it was the larger of Spring Green's two banks. Architects William F. Hilgen and Frank L. Ludwig of Cedarburg designed the Neoclassical building. The one-story brick building's design features a recessed entrance with a terra cotta door frame, a Classical column on each side of the entrance, a frieze with ornamental corbels, a dentillated cornice, and a parapet roof. The design uses brown terra cotta supplied by the Midland Terra Cotta Company; brown terra cotta was much more expensive than the white terra cotta typically seen in Neoclassical buildings of the era. The bank is the only Neoclassical building in Spring Green.

The building was added to the National Register of Historic Places on July 16, 2010.
