= Harrisburg School (Sauk County, Wisconsin) =

- U.S. National Register of Historic Places
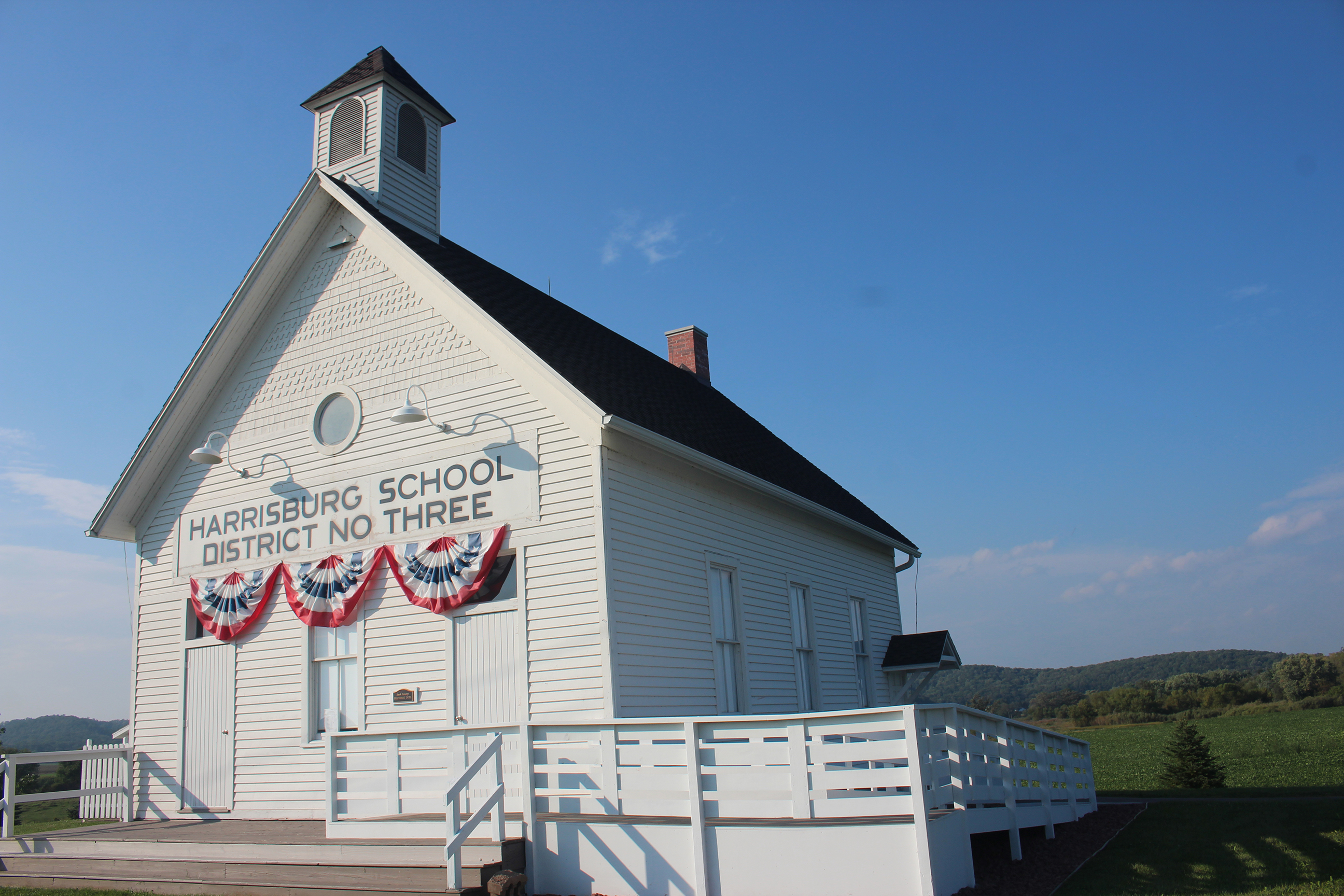

- Location within Wisconsin
- Location: E7646 CTH-B, Troy, Wisconsin
- Coordinates: 43°15′23″N 89°56′22″W
- Built: 1892
- NRHP reference No.: 15000109
- Added to NRHP: March 24, 2015

Harrisburg School is a historic one-room schoolhouse in the township of Troy in rural Sauk County, Wisconsin. The Harrisburg School District built the school in 1892 to replace its original 1856 school building, which the district had outgrown by the 1890s. The one-story school is 26 by 38 feet (7.9 by 11.6 m) and has clapboard siding and a gable roof topped by a wooden belfry over the entrance. As the community of Harrisburg was quite small, the school mainly served children living on farms in the surrounding area. A furnace was added to the school in 1908, and the Works Progress Administration added a basement and new ceilings to the structure in the 1930s. The school closed in 1955 as a result of rural school consolidation in Sauk County.

The building was added to the National Register of Historic Places on March 24, 2015.
