= Spellman Granite Works =

- U.S. National Register of Historic Places
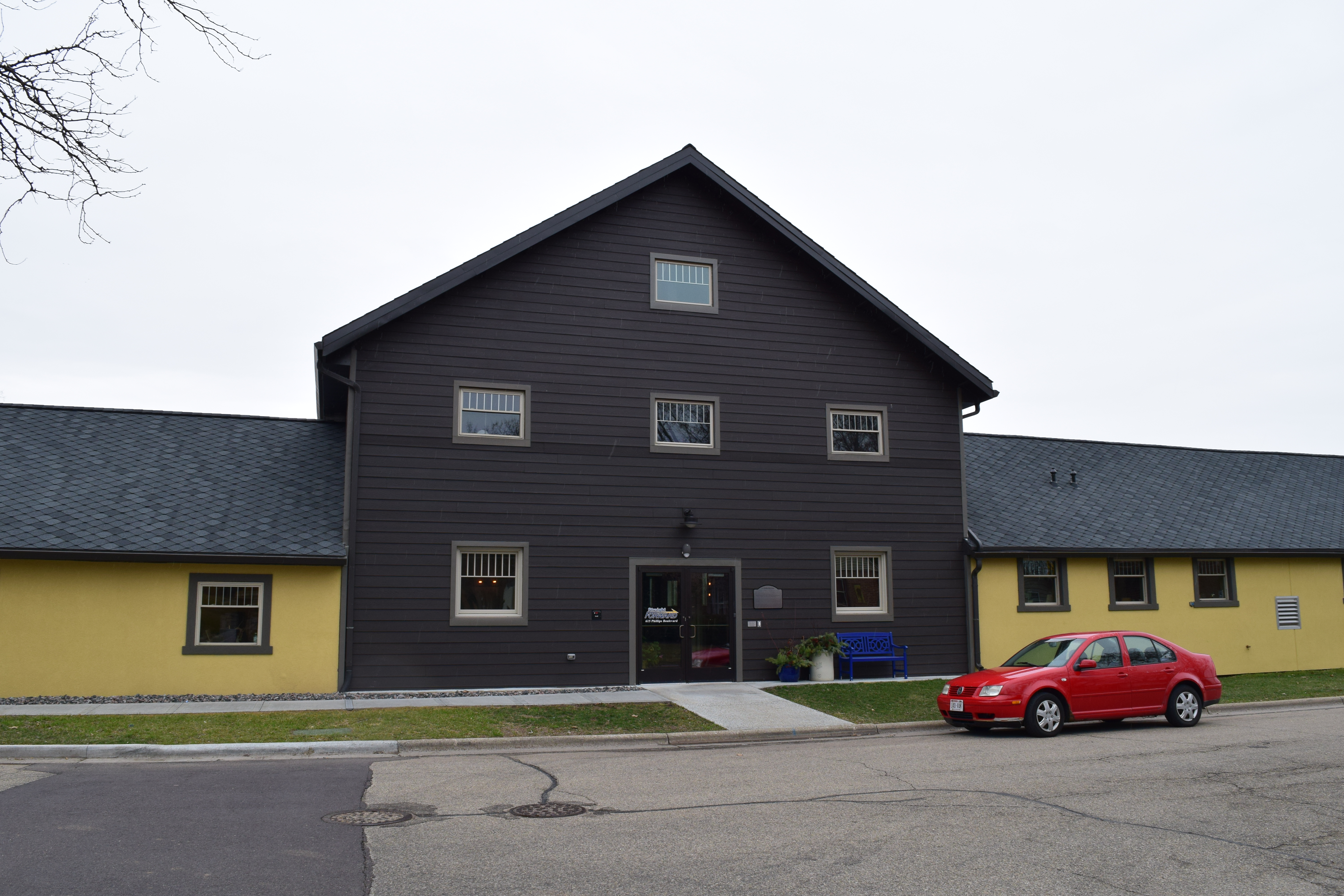

- Location within Wisconsin
- Location: 615 Phillips Blvd., Sauk City, Wisconsin
- Coordinates: 43°16′19″N 89°43′44″W
- NRHP reference No.: 15000426
- Added to NRHP: July 14, 2015

The Spellman Granite Works is a historic industrial building at 615 Phillips Boulevard in Sauk City, Wisconsin. It was originally built elsewhere in Sauk City for the Kahn Foundry and Wagon Company. Brothers Bill, Harry, and John Spellman purchased it in 1915 and moved it to its current location two years later. The Spellman brothers produced granite monuments and memorials, particularly tombstones and other burial markers. At the time, Wisconsin had roughly twenty granite quarries, and many stonecrafting companies formed to turn rough granite into monuments. The company expanded their workshop in 1921, and continued to grow and mechanize their process over the next decade; by 1945, they had become the second-largest granite monument company in the state. They also played a role in Sauk City's civic life by donating statues for local veterans' memorials and cornerstones for new public buildings. The company continued to use the building until 2005, when it relocated to an industrial park outside of Sauk City; by the late twentieth century, they were the largest of only three granite monument companies remaining in Wisconsin.

National Register of Historic Places added the building on July 14, 2015.
