= Otto Sr. and Lisette Hahn House =

- U.S. National Register of Historic Places
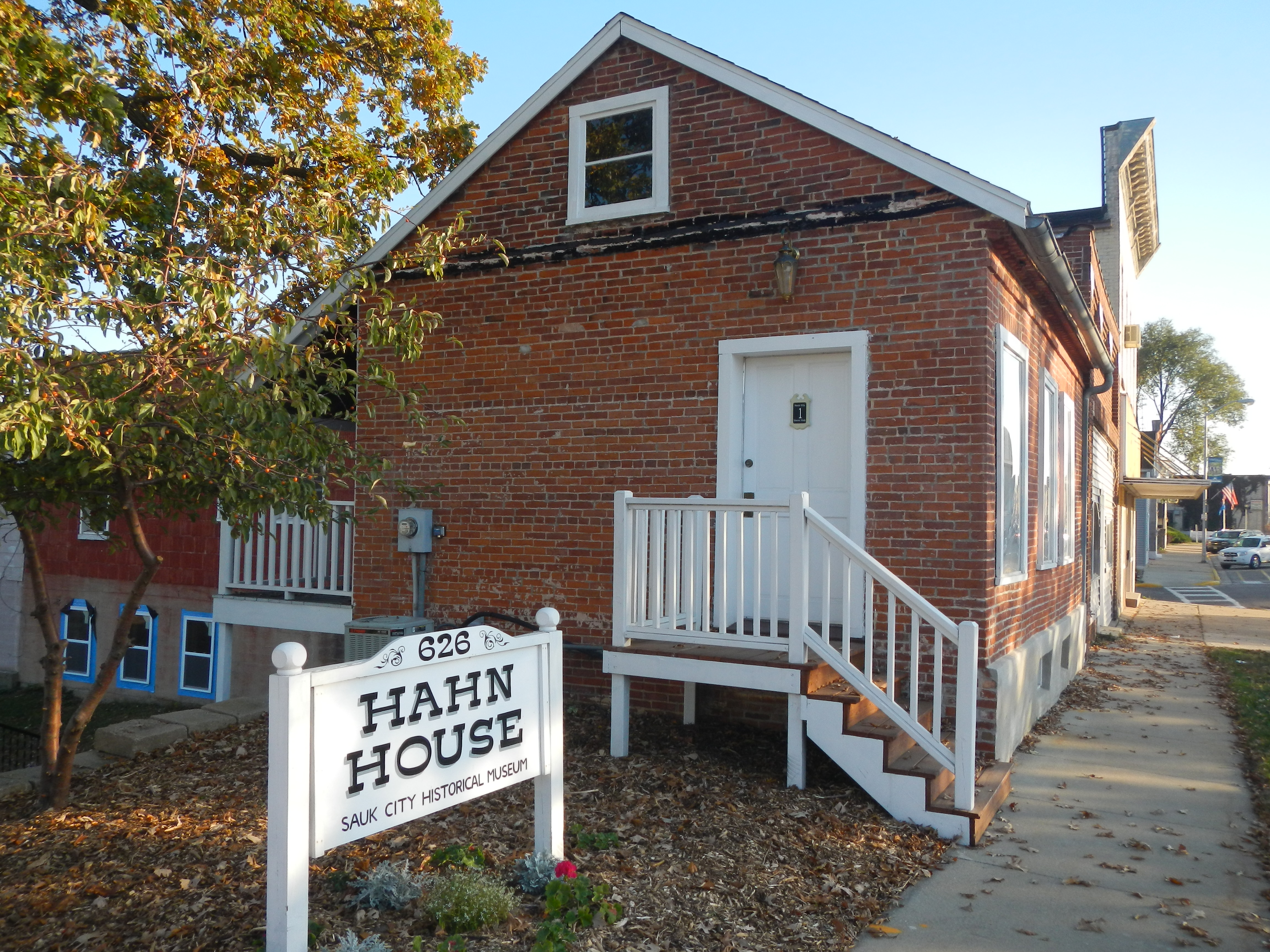

- Location within Wisconsin
- Location: 626 Water St., Sauk City, Wisconsin
- Coordinates: 43.27344°N 89.72072°W
- Area: less than one acre
- Built: 1850s
- NRHP reference No.: 11001015
- Added to NRHP: January 4, 2012

The Otto Sr. and Lisette Hahn House is a historic house at 626 Water Street in Sauk City, Wisconsin. The house was built between 1850 and 1857; Otto Sr. and Lisette Hahn, both German immigrants, bought it in 1866. The one-story brick house has a side gable plan, a popular vernacular layout in the mid-nineteenth century in which a building's gable roof ran parallel to the front facade. Otto Hahn was a harness and saddle maker by trade, and he added a workshop to the rear of the house to expand his business. Shortly after giving birth to her fifth child in 1871, Lisette drowned herself and the child in the Wisconsin River, leaving Otto to raise the remaining children. Hahn and his descendants owned the house until 1952, when the family sold it to Sauk City for use as a local history museum.

The house was added to the National Register of Historic Places on January 4, 2012.
