= Hulburt Creek Garden Beds =

Archaeological site in Delton, Wisconsin

- U.S. National Register of Historic Places
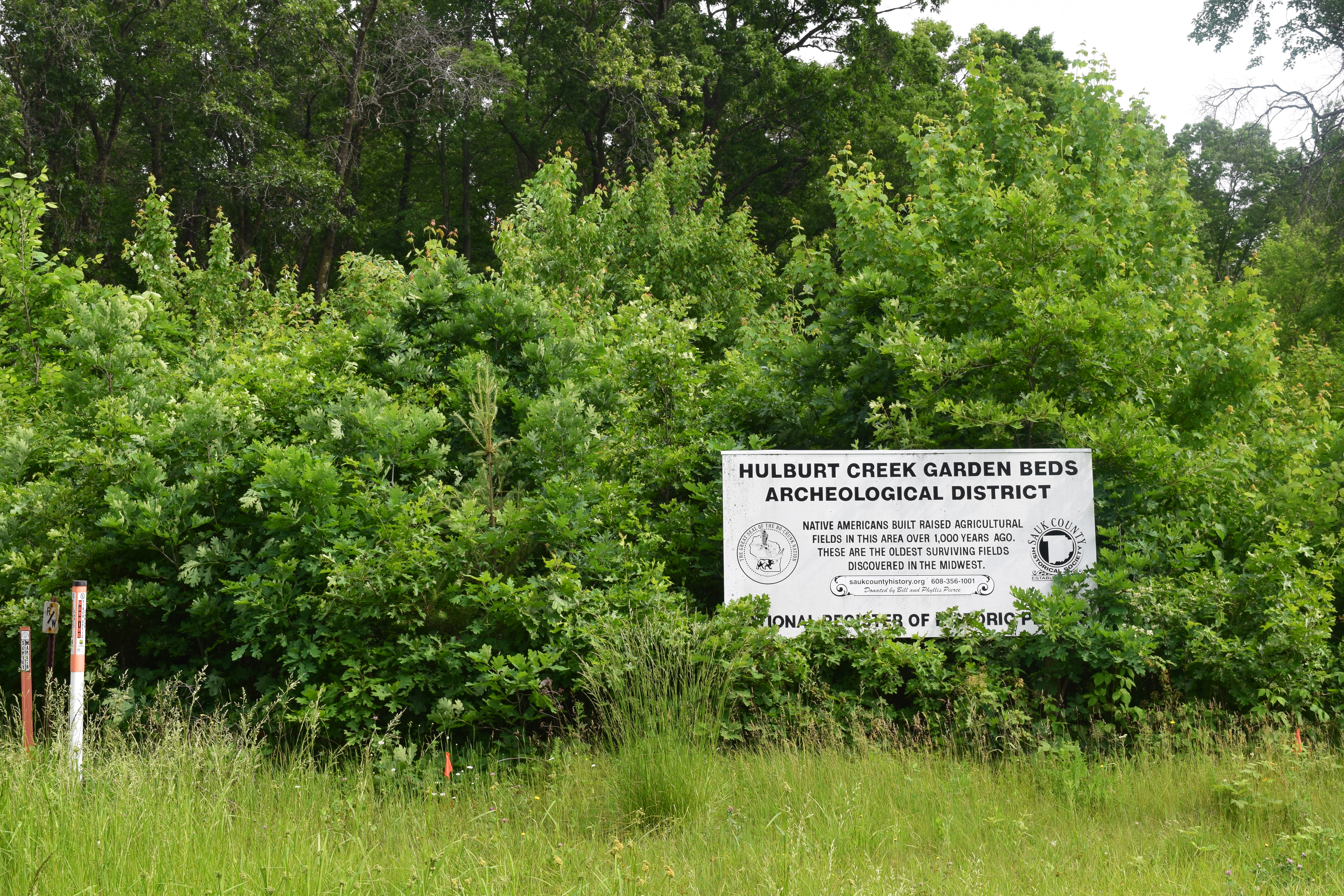

- Location within Wisconsin
- Location: Birchwood Road near CTH H, Delton, Wisconsin
- Coordinates: 43°37′08″N 89°49′38″W
- Area: 225 acres (91 ha)
- NRHP reference No.: 91000958
- Added to NRHP: August 8, 1991

The Hulburt Creek Garden Beds are an archaeological site on Birchwood Road near its intersection with County Highway H in the town of Delton, Wisconsin. The site encompasses 200 acres (81 ha) of ridged garden beds used by pre-Columbian Native Americans. Based on radiocarbon dating, the garden beds date to roughly 1000 A.D., making them the oldest surviving garden beds in the Upper Midwest; this places the site within the Late Woodland period. The garden beds were most likely used to grow native plants such as corn, beans, squash, and pumpkins. Landowner Bill Pierce donated the site to the Sauk County Historical Society in 2008.

The site was listed on the National Register of Historic Places on August 8, 1991.
