= August W. Derleth House =

- U.S. National Register of Historic Places
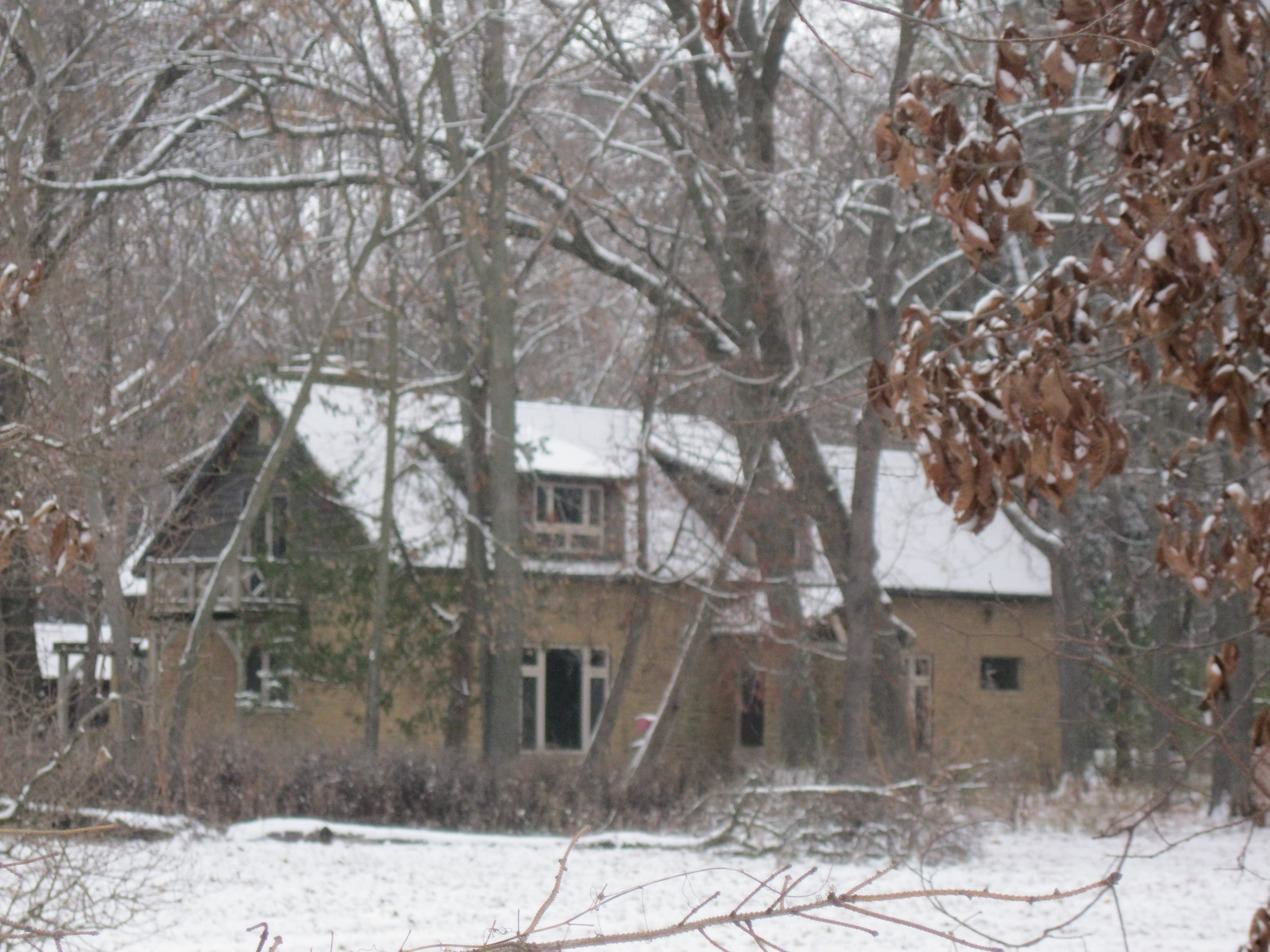

- Location within Wisconsin
- Location: S10431a Lueders Rd., Sauk City, Wisconsin
- Coordinates: 43°15′59″N 89°44′26″W
- Area: 10 acres (4.0 ha)
- Built: 1939
- Architect: Leo Julius Weissenborn
- NRHP reference No.: 91000468
- Added to NRHP: April 30, 1991

The August W. Derleth House, also known as the Place of Hawks, is located at S10431a Lueders Road in Sauk City, Wisconsin. It was the former home of author August Derleth (1909-1971). Built in 1939, the house reflects Derleth's early success as a writer, having earned recognition as a Guggenheim Fellow in 1938.

The house was designed by Sauk City architect Leo Julius Weissenborn (born 1877) and in the Gablefront House style (specifically Gabled Ell). It is a one-and-a-half-story stone structure modeled after the nineteenth-century vernacular farmhouses typical of the area. The house is surrounded by about 10 acres of woodland with gardens surrounding the home that were planted by renowned gardener Frisco Lueders.

While living in this home, Derleth wrote the majority of his 150 books, taught English at the University of Madison, and wrote articles for the local newspaper. He was known for his horror and fantasy stories as well as his Wisconsin-based regionalist works.

Derleth's nickname for the house, Place of Hawks, comes from one of his published works of the same name.

In addition to his writing, Derleth founded Arkham House, a publishing company originally based in the attic of the house and later in a separate building on the property. Arkham House was notable for being the first to publish H.P. Lovecraft's works in book form. Derleth lived in the house until his death in 1971.

The house was added to the National Register of Historic Places on April 30, 1991.
