= Salem Evangelical Church (Plain, Wisconsin) =

Historic church in Wisconsin, United States

- U.S. National Register of Historic Places
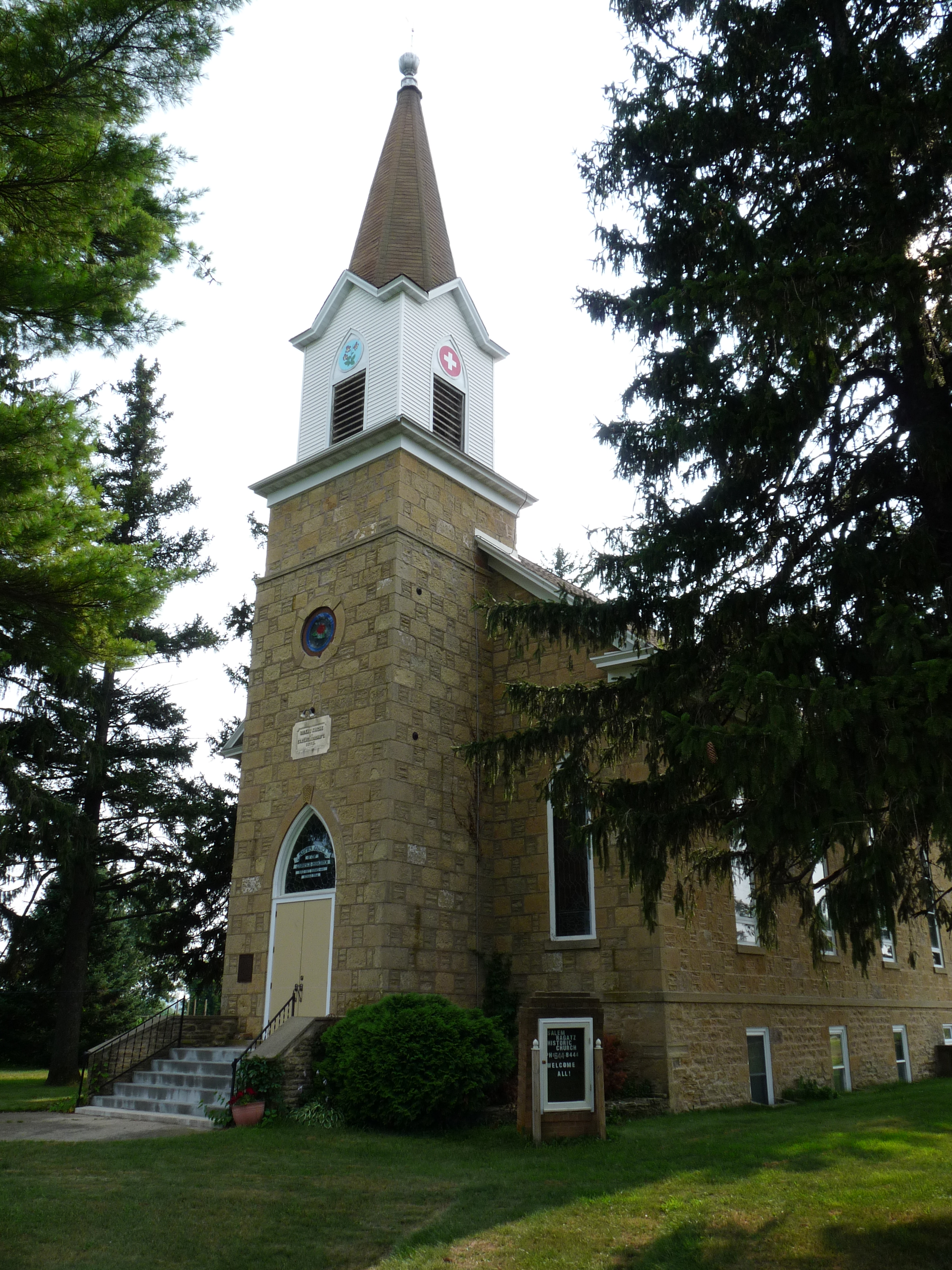

- Location within Wisconsin Location within the United States
- Nearest city: Plain, Wisconsin
- Coordinates: 43°17′59″N 89°50′30″W
- Built: 1875
- Architect: Kindschi, Peter; Et al.
- Architectural style: Gothic Revival
- NRHP reference No.: 86003576
- Added to NRHP: March 29, 1988

Salem Evangelical Church, also known as the Ragatz Church or Salem United Methodist Church of Honey Creek Township, is a historic church building at the intersection of County Highway PF and Church Road in Plain, Wisconsin. The Gothic Revival church was built in 1875. Its congregation, which was formed in 1844, was part of the local Swiss immigrant community. Bartholomew Ragatz, a Swiss immigrant from whom the church's alternate name is derived, helped draw traveling Evangelical ministers to preach for the community, and he set up a local revival meeting in 1853. The church's design includes an ashlar stone exterior with arched doors and windows and a steepled belfry above the main entrance. The belfry burned down in 1904, and though it was rebuilt to match the original, the new steeple was roughly 25 feet (7.6 m) shorter. The church was listed on the National Register of Historic Places in 1988.
