= William Stolte Jr. House =

Historic house in Wisconsin, United States

- U.S. National Register of Historic Places
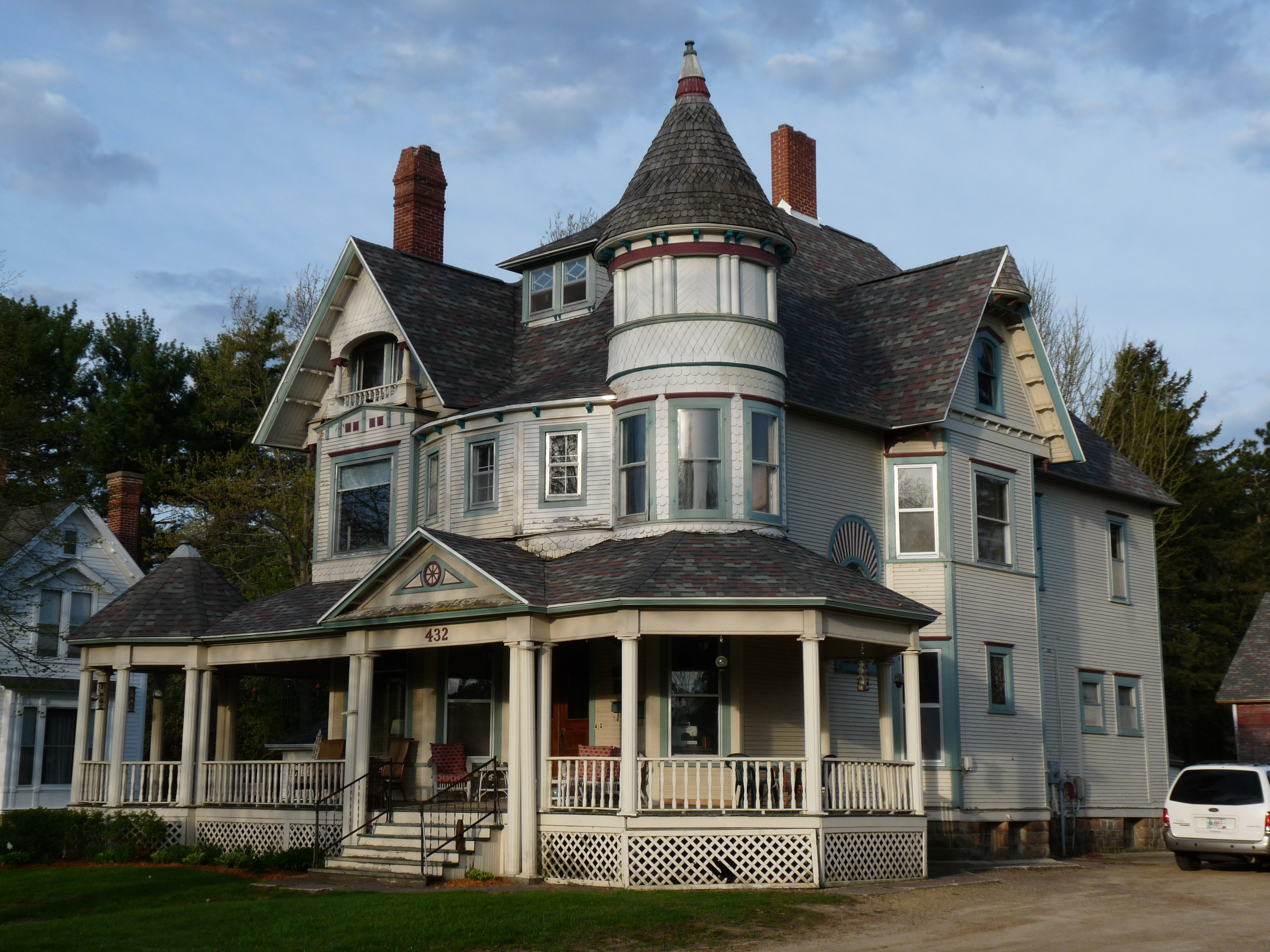

- Location within Wisconsin Location within the United States
- Location: 432 S. Walnut St., Reedsburg, Wisconsin, U.S.
- Coordinates: 43°31′44″N 90°0′30″W
- Area: less than one acre
- Built: c. 1890-1899
- Architectural style: Queen Anne
- MPS: Reedsburg MRA
- NRHP reference No.: 84000667
- Added to NRHP: December 26, 1984

William Stolte Jr. House is a historic house at 432 S. Walnut Street in Reedsburg, Wisconsin, United States. The house was built in the 1890s for local merchant William Stolte Jr. The two-and-a-half story house has a Queen Anne design, a popular style of the late nineteenth century. The house's design includes a wraparound front porch supported by fluted columns, a pedimented front entrance, and multiple projecting bays. The complex hip and gable roof includes two dormers and a round turret with a conical roof; both the turret and the dormers feature decorative shingles and woodwork.

The house was added to the National Register of Historic Places in 1984. The neighboring William Stolte Sr. House is also listed on the National Register.
