= William Stolte Sr. House =

Historic house in Wisconsin, United States

- U.S. National Register of Historic Places
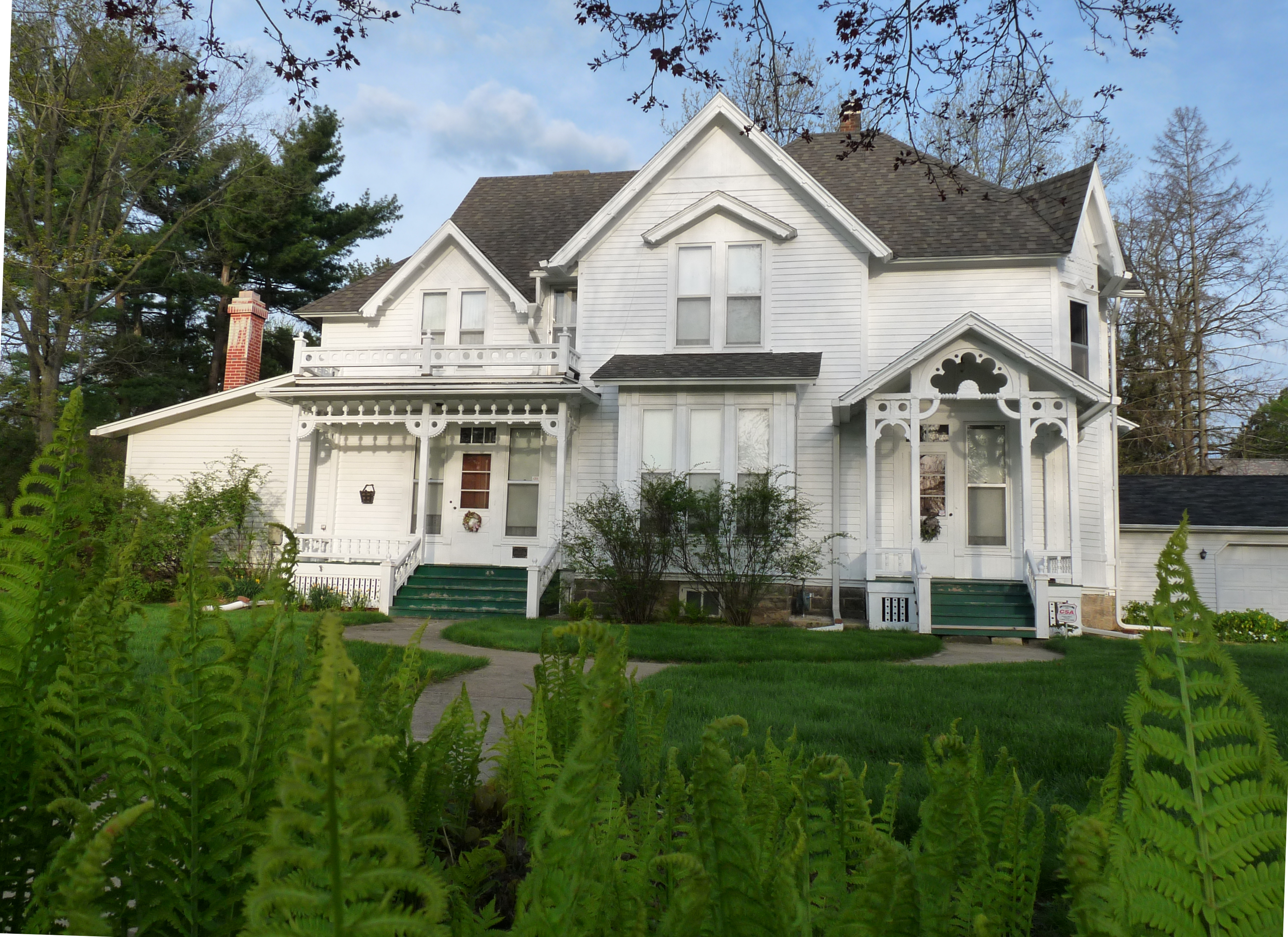

- Location within Wisconsin Location within the United States
- Location: 444 S. Walnut St., Reedsburg, Wisconsin
- Coordinates: 43°31′43″N 90°0′30″W
- Area: less than one acre
- Built: 1890
- Architectural style: Gothic, Queen Anne
- MPS: Reedsburg MRA
- NRHP reference No.: 84000670
- Added to NRHP: December 26, 1984

William Stolte Sr. House is a historic late 19th-century house located at 432 South Walnut Street, next to William Stolte Jr. House in Reedsburg, Wisconsin. It was added to the National Register of Historic Places on December 26, 1984.

It is a two-story frame house. It is designed in a Victorian Gothic/Queen Anne style "with a hip and gable roof and scroll-like modillions ornamenting the cornice."

Its back yard, which goes down to the Baraboo River, includes a frame smokehouse and a hitching post with "Stolte" inscribed upon it.
