= Wisconsin Highway 136 =

State highway in Wisconsin, United States

State Trunk Highway 136
- WIS 136 highlighted in red

Route information
- Maintained by WisDOT
- Length: 17.1 mi (27.5 km)

Major junctions
- West end: WIS 23 / WIS 33 in Reedsburg
- US 12 in West Baraboo
- East end: CTH-DL in Baraboo

Location
- Country: United States
- State: Wisconsin
- Counties: Sauk

Highway system
- Wisconsin State Trunk Highway System; Interstate; US; State; Scenic; Rustic
← WIS 135	→ WIS 137
← WIS 158	WIS 159	→ WIS 160

State Trunk Highway 136 (often called Highway 136, STH-136 or WIS 136) is a state highway in the U.S. state of Wisconsin. It runs east–west in southwest Wisconsin from near Reedsburg to Baraboo. The route was first designated in 1917 but not as WIS 136 until 1935. The highway was extended in 2017.

== Route description ==
The highway begins at an intersection with WIS 23/WIS 33 east of Reedsburg. From there, it runs south along Copper Creek. Where Copper Creek drains into the Baraboo River, the highway follows the river in a southeasterly direction to Rock Springs, where it intersects WIS 154 and County Trunk Highway DD (CTH-DD). The highway then runs north of the Baraboo River in an easterly direction from Rock Springs. It intersects CTH-I and continues east and then starts running along Linn Street into West Baraboo. It intersects US 12, where it starts running concurrently with WIS 33 until the concurrency ends at Pine Street, on which it runs south. The highway continues along the Pine Street alignment until it curves to the west, at which point the highway runs east from it. The highway then reaches CTH-DL, and runs concurrently with it until ending at the entrance of Devil's Lake State Park.

== History ==
A highway running near or along the Baraboo River from Reedsburg to Baraboo was designated when the state highway system was established in 1917 as part of WIS 33. In 1935, WIS 33 was rerouted to the north and the bypassed section was redesignated as WIS 136. A former WIS 136 designation running from the current route near North Freedom to Prairie du Sac was downgraded to a County Trunk Highway.

In 2017, the route was extended onto the old US 12 route, when a freeway was built in Baraboo.

=== WIS 159 ===
State Trunk Highway 159
- Location: Baraboo
- Length: 1.6 mi (2.6 km)
- Existed: 1924–2017

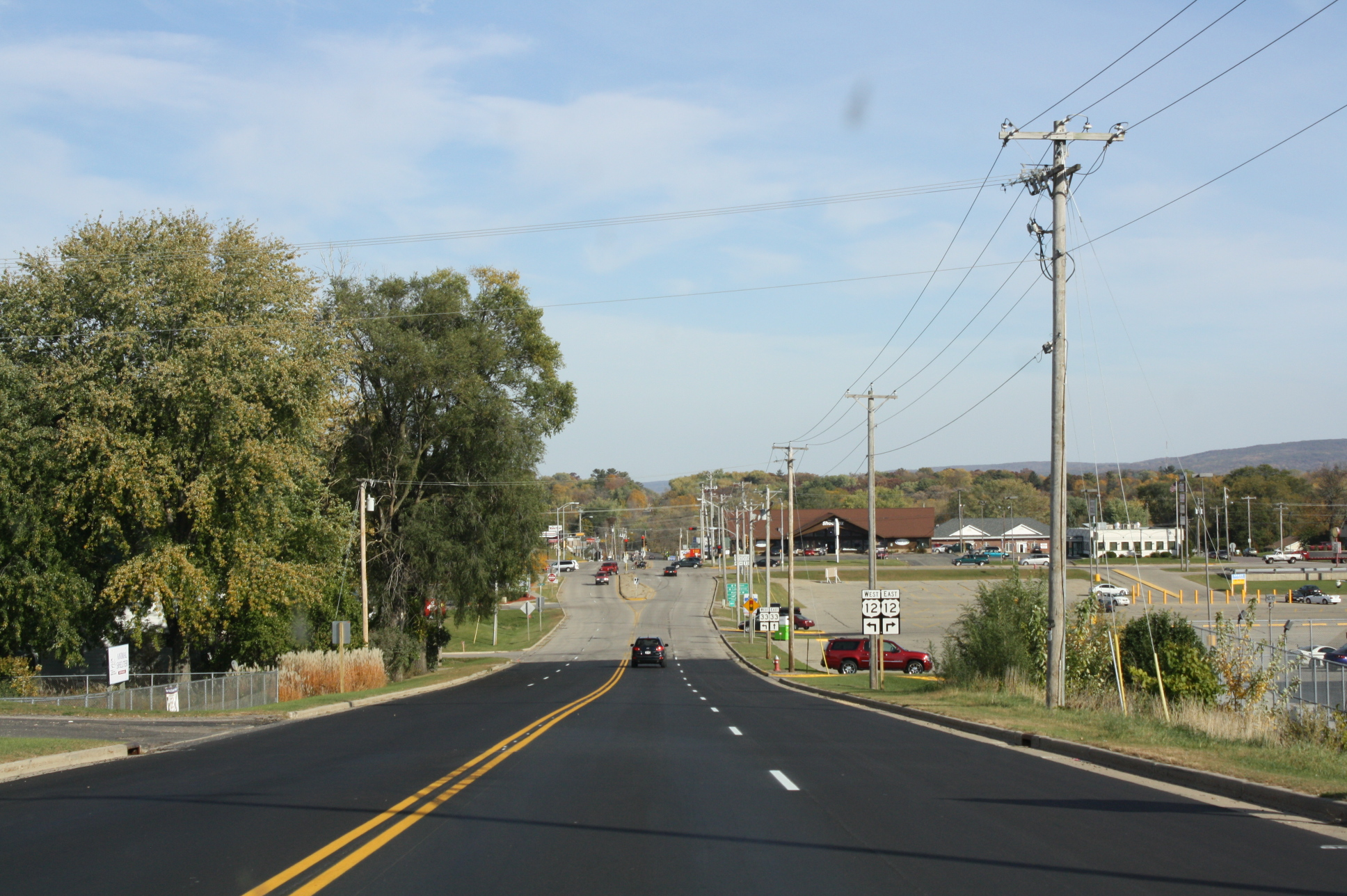
The highway's eastern terminus before it was extended

Wisconsin Highway 159 (WIS 159) was a highway that ran from US 12 south of Baraboo to the entrance of Devil's Lake State Park. The highway was first designated in 1924, as a connection between WIS 12 (later US 12) and WIS 123 near its southern terminus at Devil's Lake State Park. In 2016, WIS 123 was decommissioned and the section between WIS 159 and the Devil's Lake State Park entrance would become part of WIS 159. In 2017, it (along with the part of US 12 between it and WIS 136) was redesignated as part of WIS 136 after US 12 was bypassed near Baraboo.

== Major intersections ==
The entire route is in Sauk County.

Location	mi	km	Destinations	Notes
Excelsior–Reedsburg line	0.0	0.0	WIS 23 / WIS 33	
Rock Springs	5.1	8.2	WIS 154 west / CTH-DD south	
Excelsior	7.5	12.1	CTH-I south – North Freedom	
West Baraboo	12.7	20.4	US 12 / WIS 33 west	Western end of WIS 33 concurrency; interchange
West Baraboo	13.0	20.9	CTH-BD north / WIS 33 east Bus. US 12	Eastern end of WIS 33 concurrency
Baraboo	14.0	22.5	CTH-W Bus. US 12	
Town of Baraboo	16.8	27.0	CTH-DL north	Northern end of CTH-DL concurrency
Town of Baraboo	17.1	27.5	CTH-DL east	Southern end of CTH-DL concurrency
1.000 mi = 1.609 km; 1.000 km = 0.621 mi: Concurrency terminus
