= Baraboo Quartzite =

Precambrian geological formation in Wisconsin

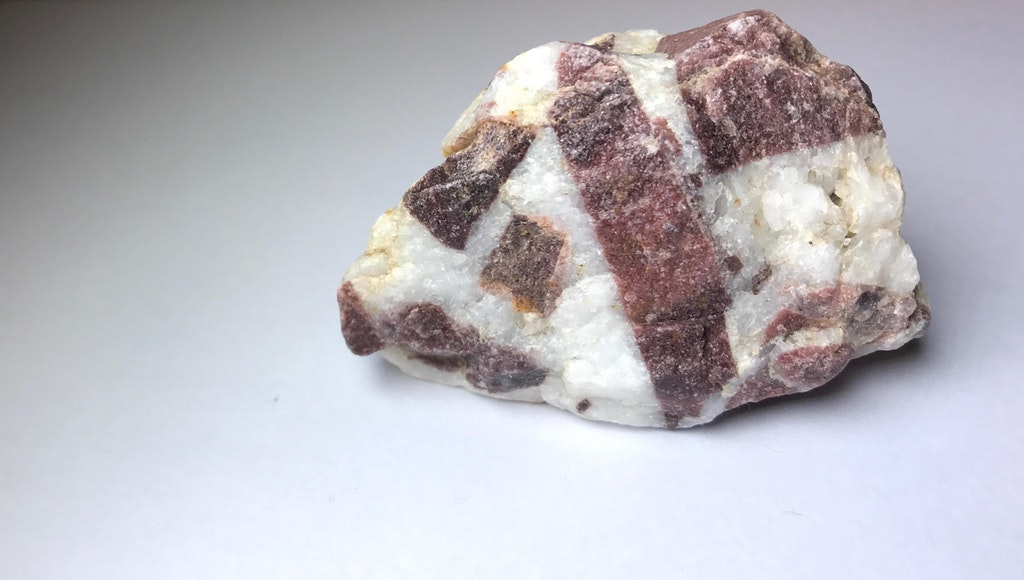
A Baraboo Quartzite sample, in breccia form. The brecciated purple portions are quartzite, and the matrix is white quartz

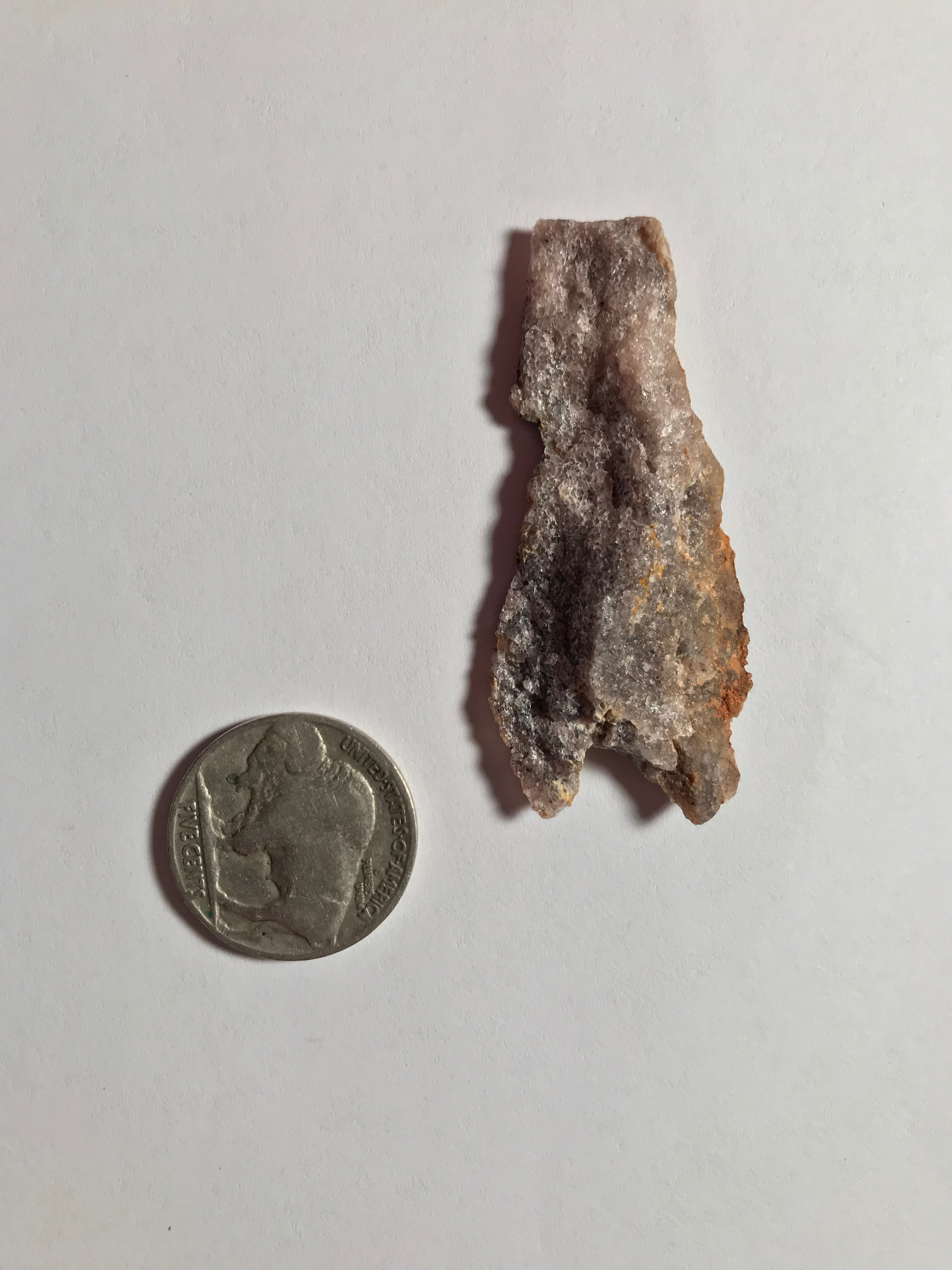
A sample of Baraboo Quartzite.

Baraboo Quartzite is a Precambrian geological formation of quartzite, found in the region of Baraboo, Wisconsin. While pure quartzite is usually white or gray, Baraboo Quartzite is typically dark purple to maroon in color, due to the presence of iron (hematite) and other impurities. Baraboo Quartzite may display strata created by progressive deposition of layers of sand in the original sandstone from which the quartzite was formed (through metamorphism). Specimens of Baraboo quartzite may also display ripple marks that appear visually similar to the patterns one might see in the sand at a beach. Ripples indicate that the sandstone from which the quartzite was metamorphosed was originally water-laid sediment.

Sandstone is converted into quartzite through heating and pressure usually related to tectonic compression within orogenic belts.

== Uses ==
Quartzite is a decorative stone and may be used to cover walls, as roofing tiles, as flooring, and stairsteps. Crushed quartzite is sometimes used in road construction. Baraboo Quartzite is commonly mined for use as railroad ballast.

== Occurrences ==
Formations of quartzite can be found throughout the Baraboo Hills in south-central Wisconsin. Many notable formations can be seen in Devil's Lake State Park.

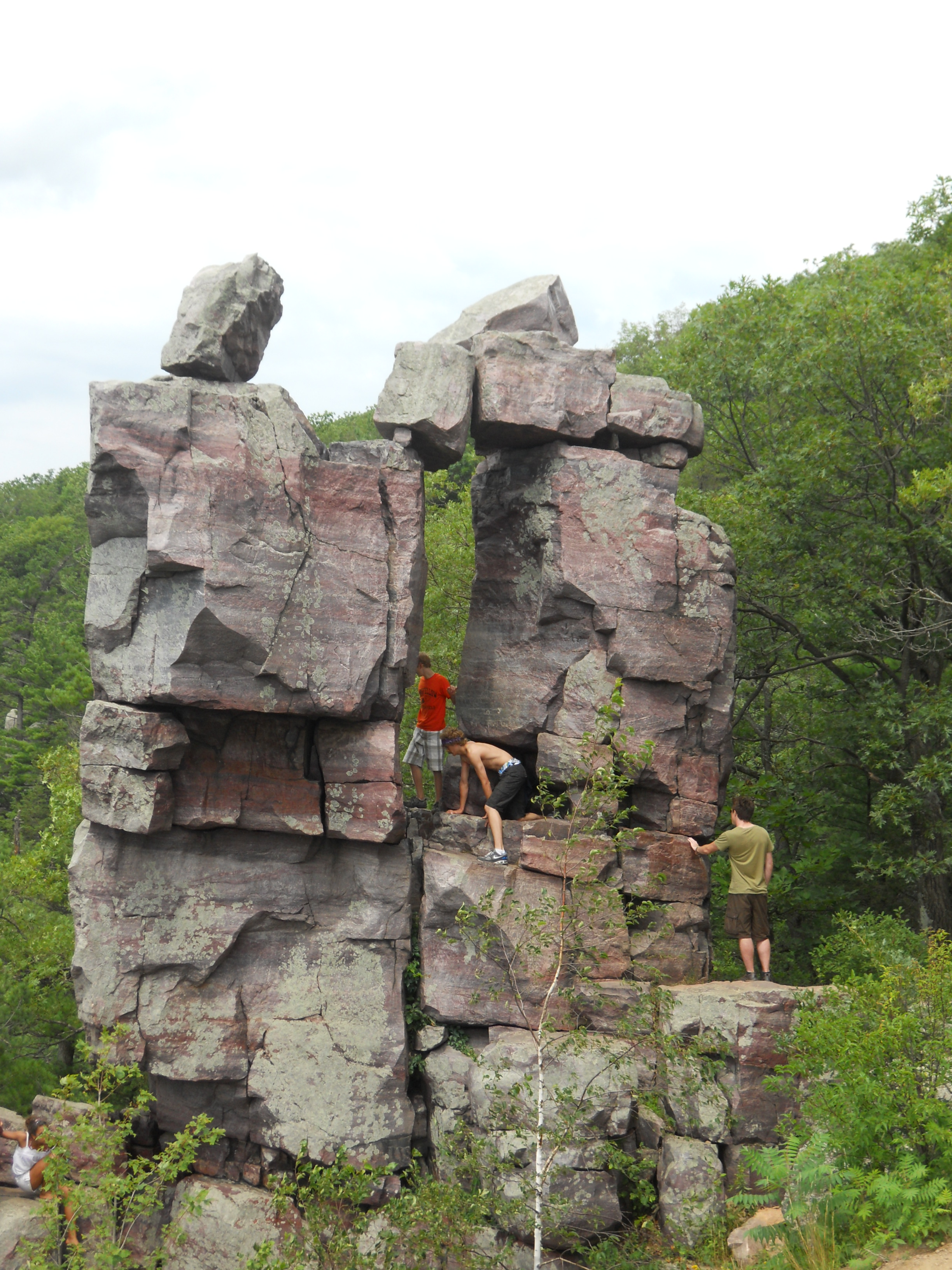
Devil's Doorway rock formation at Devil's Lake State Park

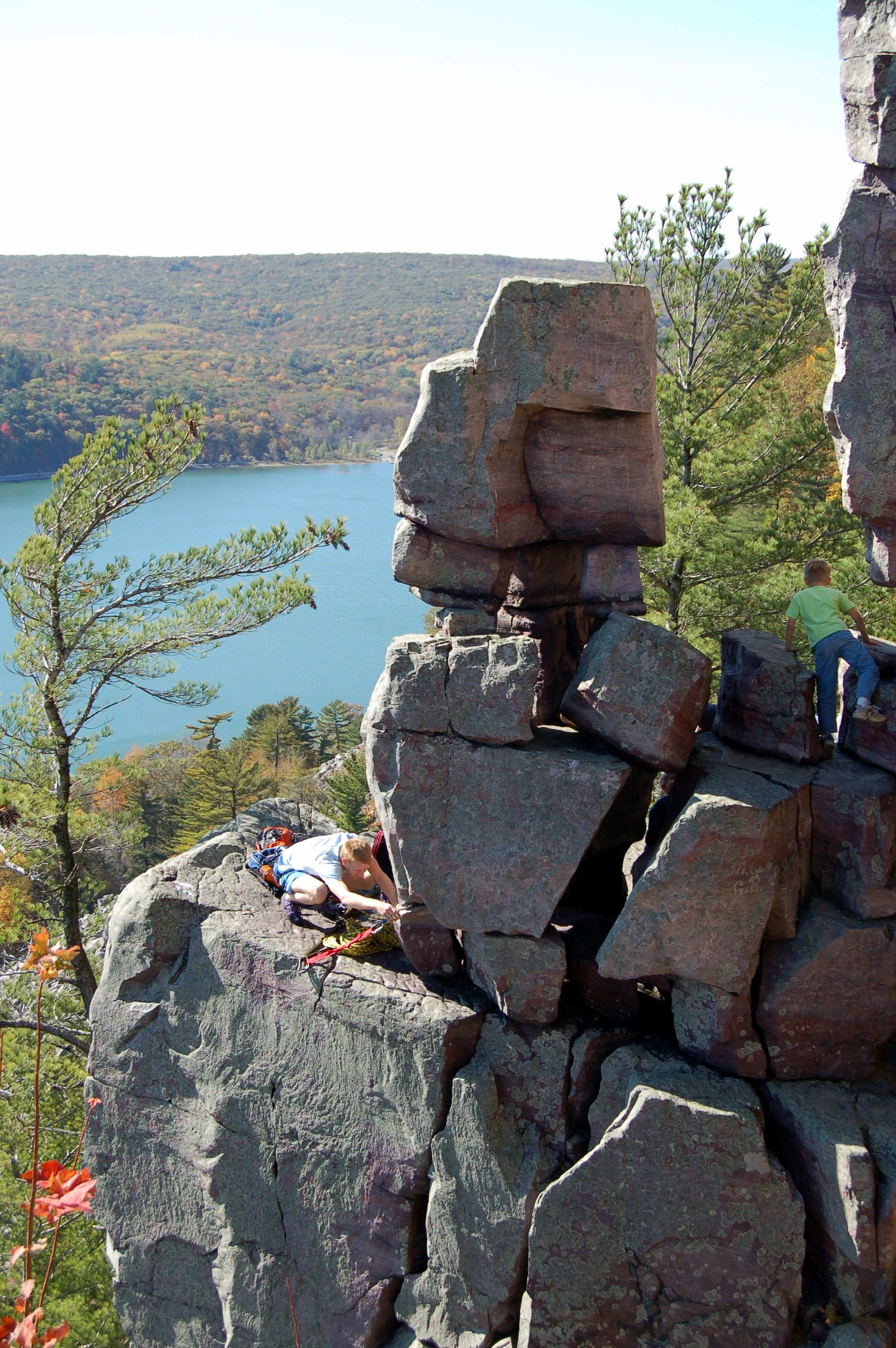
Chimney Rock

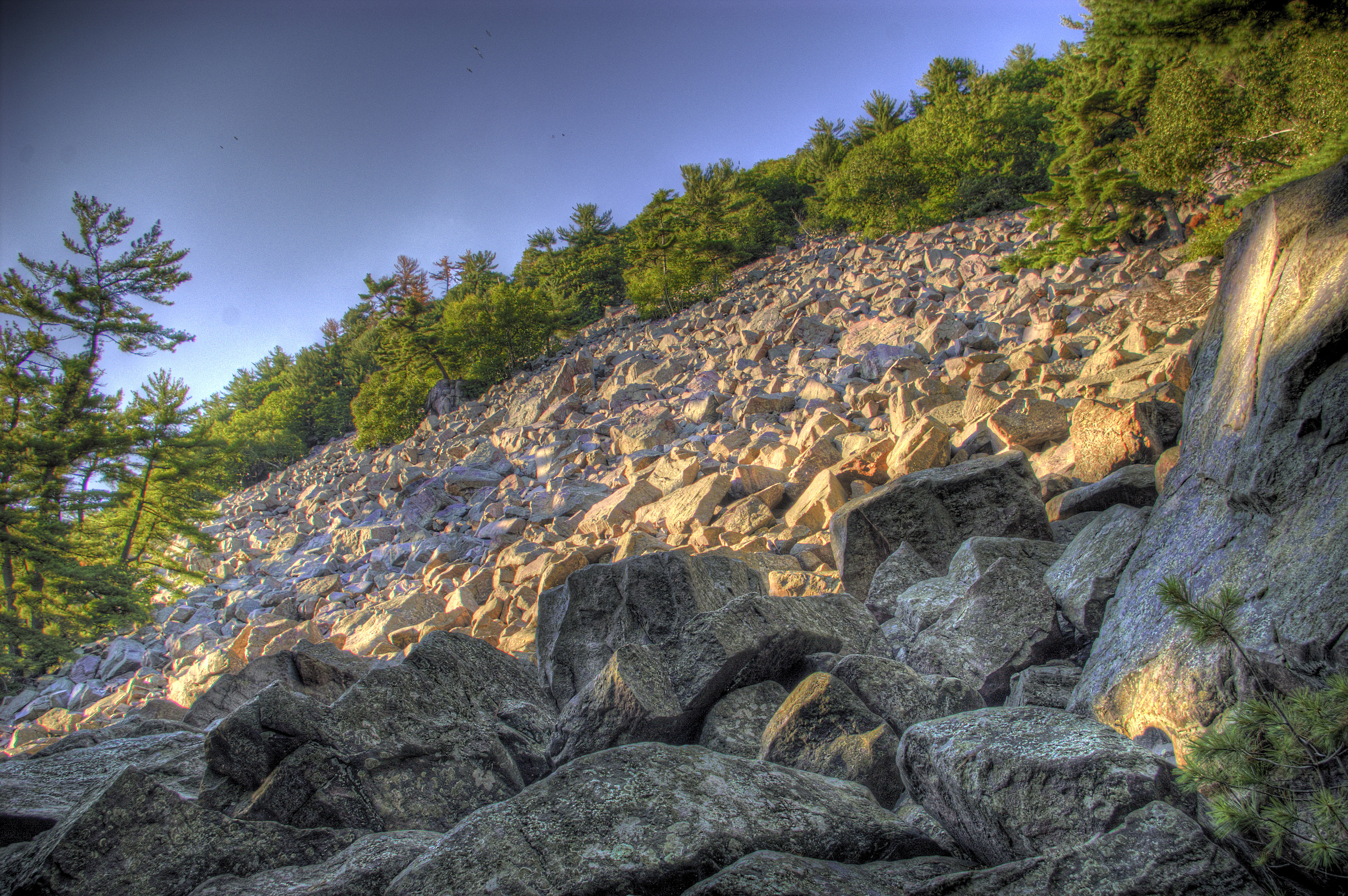
Boulder field on Eastern bluff at Devil's Lake
