= Baraboo (town), Wisconsin =

Baraboo, Wisconsin
- Town
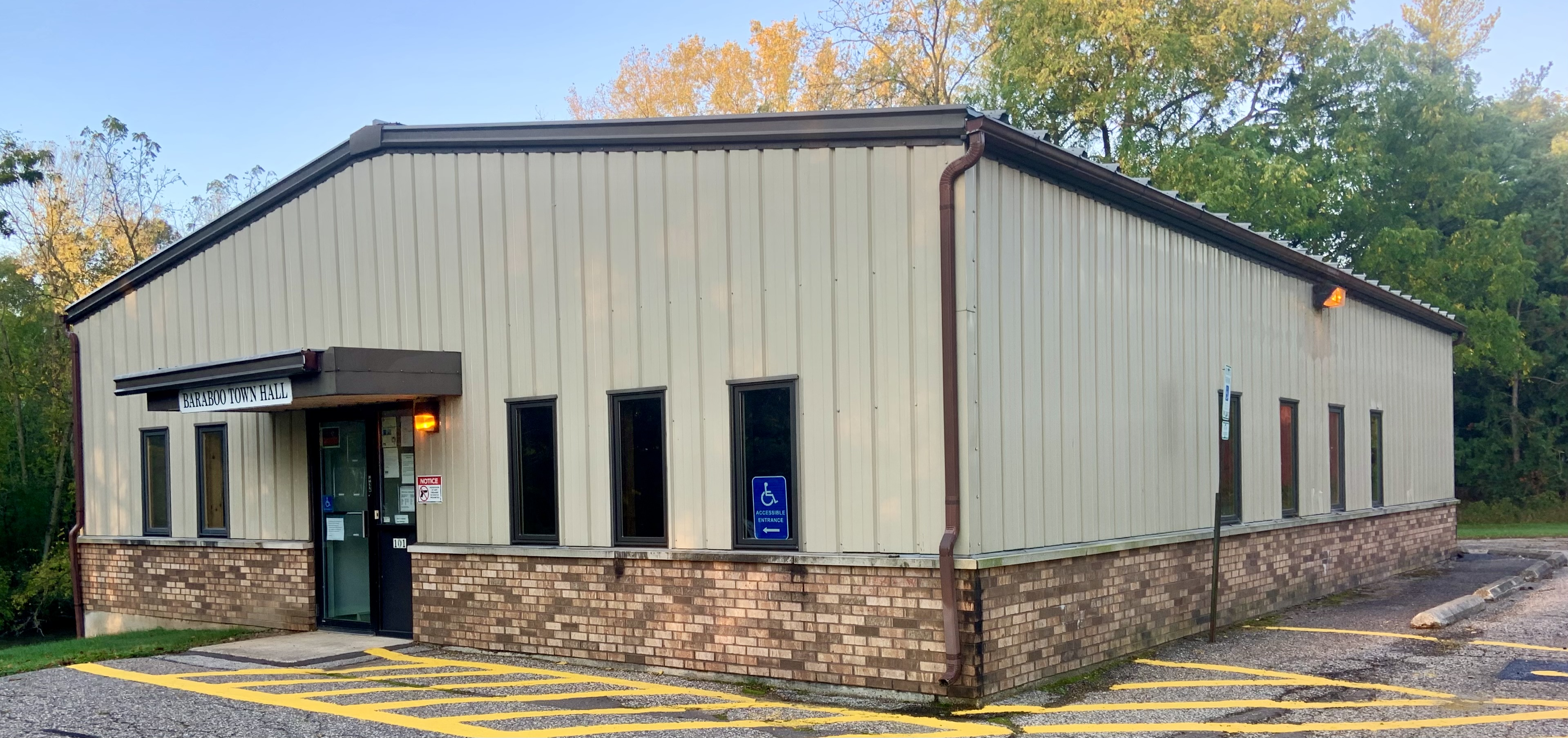
- Town hall

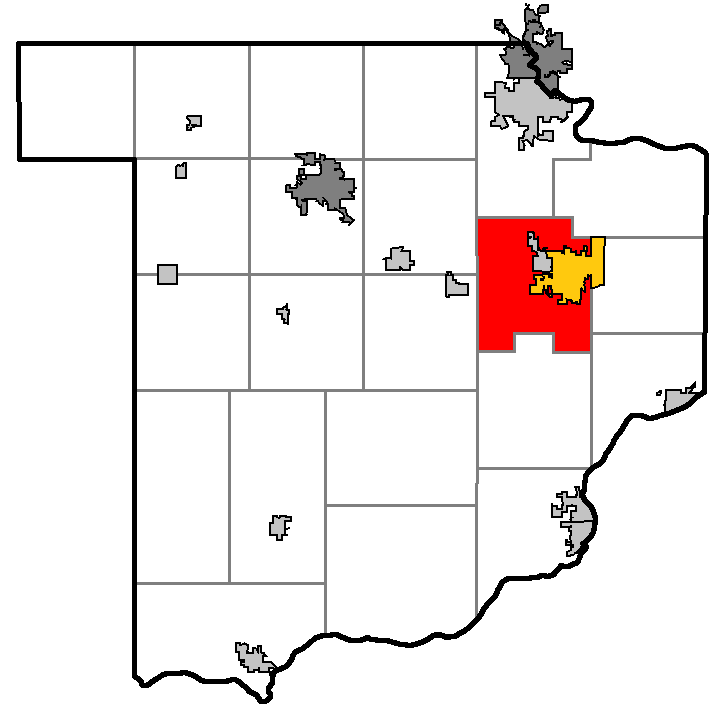
- Location of Baraboo within Sauk County, Wisconsin

- Location of Sauk County, Wisconsin
- Coordinates: 43°27′37″N 89°46′2″W
- Country: United States
- State: Wisconsin
- County: Sauk

Area
  - Total: 32.5 sq mi (84.3 km^{2})
  - Land: 32.0 sq mi (82.9 km^{2})
  - Water: 0.54 sq mi (1.4 km^{2})
- Elevation: 938 ft (286 m)

Population (2020)
  - Total: 1,816
  - Density: 56.7/sq mi (21.9/km^{2})
- Time zone: UTC-6 (Central (CST))
  - Summer (DST): UTC-5 (CDT)
- Area code: 608
- FIPS code: 55-04650
- GNIS feature ID: 1582750
- Website: https://tn.baraboo.wi.gov/

Baraboo is a town in Sauk County, Wisconsin, United States. The population was 1,816 at the 2020 census. The City of Baraboo is located mostly within the town. The unincorporated community of Crawford Crossing is located in the town.

== Geography ==
According to the United States Census Bureau, the town has a total area of 32.6 square miles (84 km^{2}), of which 32.0 square miles (83 km^{2}) is land and 0.6 square miles (1.6 km^{2}) (1.69%) is water.

== Demographics ==
As of the census of 2000, there were 1,828 people, 685 households, and 500 families residing in the town. The population density was 57.1 people per square mile (22.0 people/km^{2}). There were 751 housing units at an average density of 23.5 units per square mile (9.1 units/km^{2}). The racial makeup of the town was 97.48% White, 0.22% Black or African American, 0.82% Native American, 0.27% Asian, 0.05% Pacific Islander, 0.55% from other races, and 0.60% from two or more races. 1.59% of the population were Hispanic or Latino of any race.

There were 685 households, out of which 33.9% had children under the age of 18 living with them, 62.0% were married couples living together, 7.0% had a female householder with no husband present, and 26.9% were non-families. 21.5% of all households were made up of individuals, and 7.2% had someone living alone who was 65 years of age or older. The average household size was 2.66 and the average family size was 3.11.

In the town, the population was spread out, with 27.1% under the age of 18, 6.9% from 18 to 24, 28.1% from 25 to 44, 27.5% from 45 to 64, and 10.3% who were 65 years of age or older. The median age was 39 years. For every 100 females, there were 96.1 males. For every 100 females age 18 and over, there were 98.5 males.

The median income for a household in the town was $48,419, and the median income for a family was $55,063. Males had a median income of $36,141 versus $22,969 for females. The per capita income for the town was $22,979. About 3.1% of families and 5.4% of the population were below the poverty line, including 2.8% of those under age 18 and 11.3% of those age 65 or over.

== See also ==
- List of towns in Wisconsin
