= Wisconsin State Natural Areas Program =

Wisconsin state conservation program

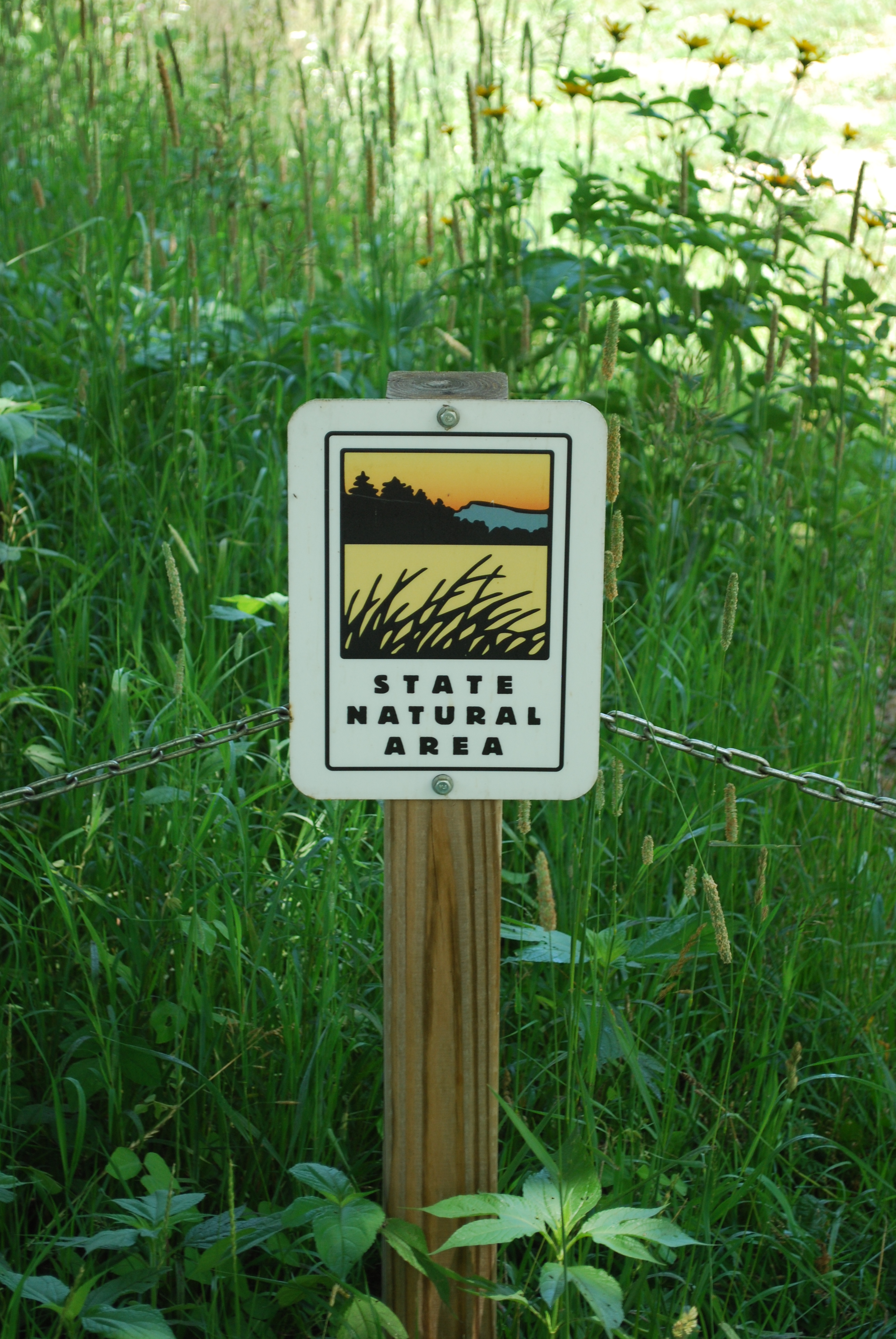
SNA Logo Sign

The Wisconsin State Natural Areas Program is a conservation program created to highlight and protect areas with outstanding natural or archaeological resources in the U.S. state of Wisconsin. There are 698 State Natural Areas (SNAs) encompassing almost 400,000 acres (160,000 ha). SNAs protect natural communities, geological formations, and archaeological sites for research purposes and as refuges for biodiversity and endangered and threatened species.

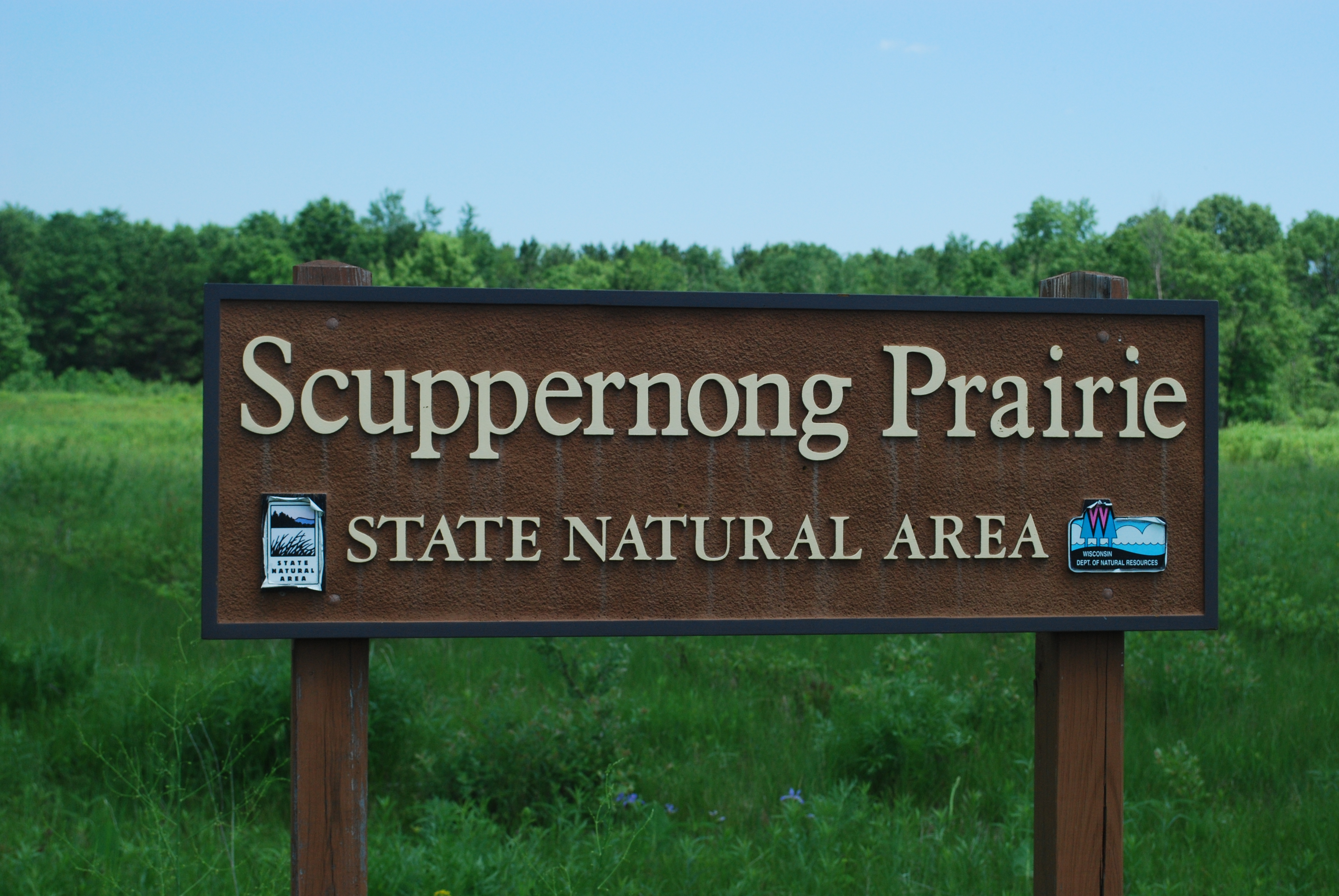
Newer SNA Sign

Wisconsin's State Natural Areas Program was created in 1951 and was the first state-sponsored program of its kind in the United States. It was developed with guidance from early conservationists such as Aldo Leopold, Norman C. Fassett, Albert Fuller, and John Thomas Curtis.

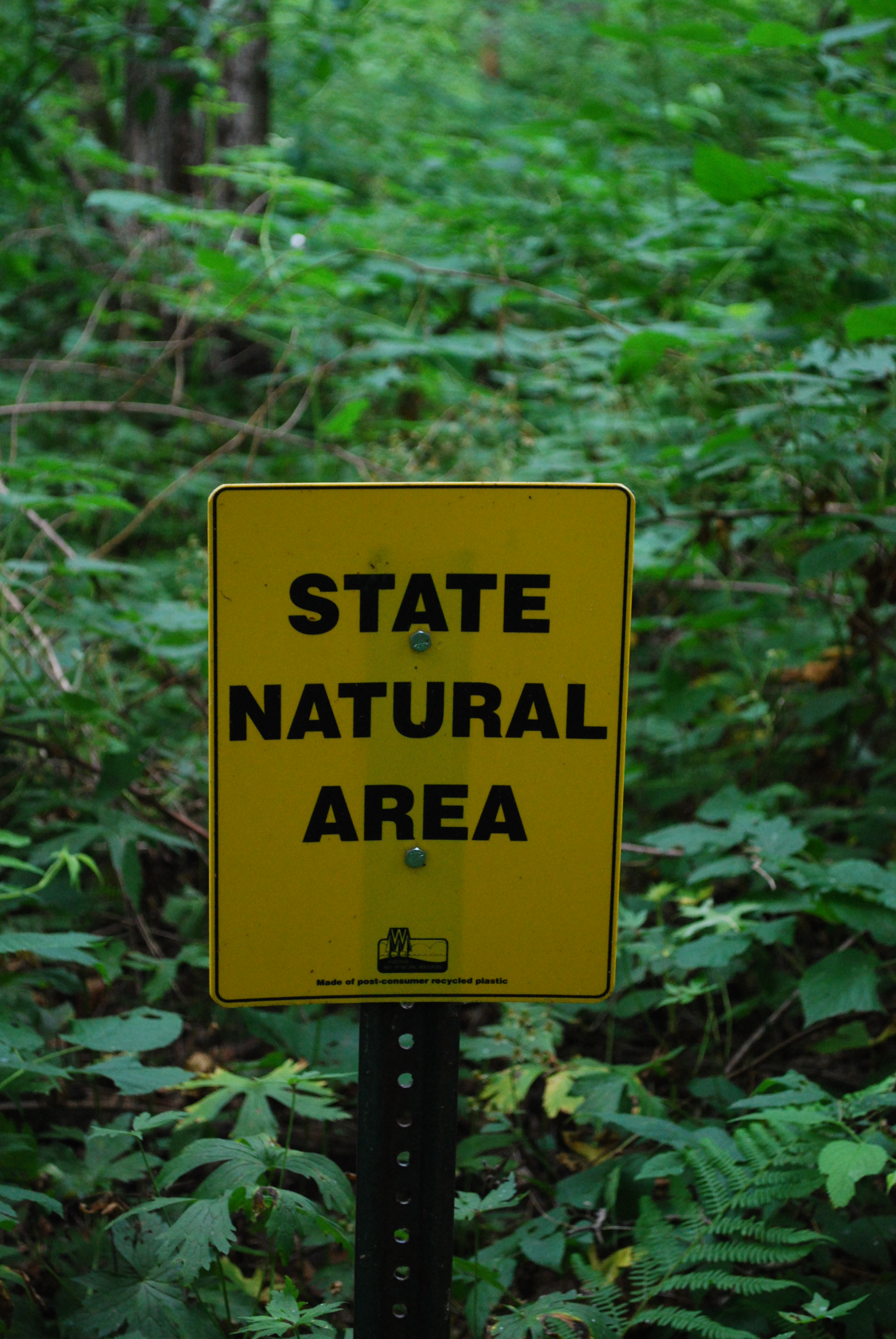
Common SNA Sign

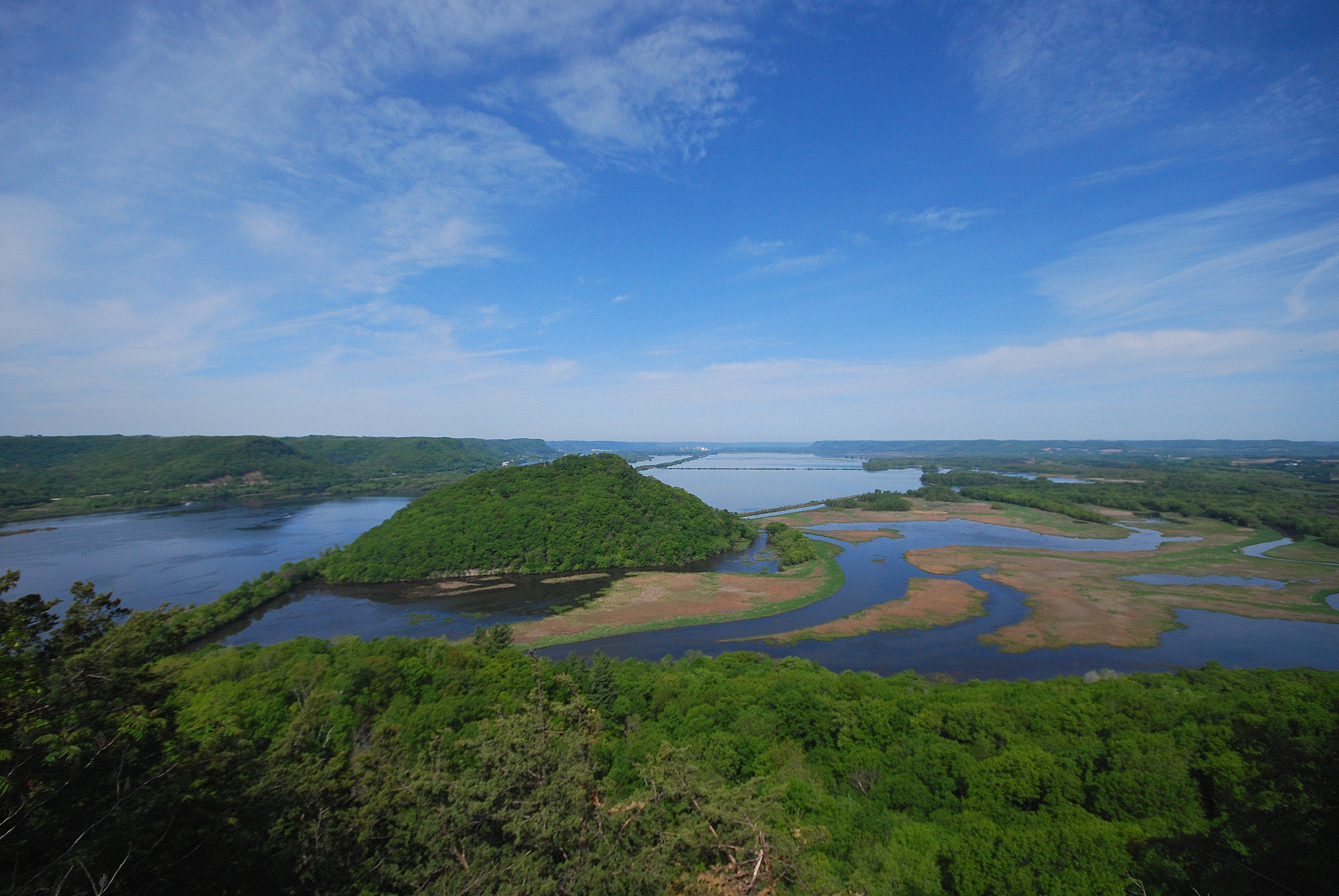
Trempealeau Mountain SNA (viewed from Brady's Bluff SNA)

The program is managed by the Bureau of Natural Heritage Conservation in the Wisconsin Department of Natural Resources and advised by the Natural Areas Preservation Council (NAPC), a council of 11 scientists and conservationists. The smallest SNAs are fewer than 1 acre (0.40 ha) and the largest is over 7,700 acres (3,100 ha). Many SNAs have been established on the state owned lands, including Wisconsin state parks. Others are on land managed by other entities like the U.S. Forest Service, National Park Service, county governments, or conservation organizations like The Nature Conservancy. In those cases, cooperative agreements or conservation easements are used.

Ecosystem management practices range from a "hands-off" approach to active interventions such as the removal of introduced species and controlled burning. SNAs are generally open to low-impact recreation like hiking and birdwatching, but prohibit intensive activities like camping and mountain biking, and usually lack even basic amenities like restrooms or maintained trails. Numerous SNAs are closed to the public to protect the most sensitive flora, fauna, and ecosystems, including rare and endangered species.

== List of Wisconsin State Natural Areas ==
SNA #	SNA Name	County	Image
1	Parfrey's Glen	Sauk	
2	Cedarburg Bog	Ozaukee	
3	Faville Prairie	Jefferson	
4	Flambeau River Hardwood Forest	Sawyer	
5	Wyalusing Hardwood Forest	Grant	
6	Scuppernong Prairie	Waukesha	
7	Necedah Oak-Pine Savanna	Juneau	
8	Cedar Grove Hawk Research Station	Sheboygan	
9	Brady's Bluff Prairie	Trempealeau	
10	Dewey Heights Prairie	Grant	
11	Haskell Noyes Memorial Woods	Fond du Lac	
12	Peninsula Park Beech Forest	Door	
13	Peninsula Park White Cedar Forest	Door	
14	Necedah Oak-Pine Forest	Juneau	
15	Mt. Pisgah Hemlock-Hardwoods	Vernon	
16	Castle Mound Pine Forest	Jackson	
17	The Ridges Sanctuary	Door	
18	Midway Railroad Prairie	La Crosse	
19	Pine Cliff	Iowa	
20	Krueger Pines	Lincoln	
21	Trout Lake Conifer Swamp	Vilas	
22	Toy Lake Swamp	Iron	
23	Browntown Oak Forest	Green	
24	Nipissing Swamp	Manitowoc	
24	Wilderness Ridge	Manitowoc	
25	Lake of the Pines Conifer-Hardwoods	Sawyer	
26	Plum Lake Hemlock Forest	Vilas	
27	Devil's Lake Oak Forest	Sauk	
28	New Observatory Woods	Dane	
29	Buena Vista Quarry Prairie	Portage	
30	Tiffany Bottoms	Buffalo	
31	Finnerud Pine Forest	Oneida	
32	Crex Sand Prairie	Burnett	
33	Tower Hill Bottoms	Iowa	
34	Bittersweet Lakes	Vilas	
35	Ripon Prairie	Fond du Lac	
35	Muehl Springs	Sheboygan	
36	Avon Bottoms	Rock	
37	Seagull Bar	Marinette	
38	Abraham's Woods	Green	
39	Charles Pond	Oconto	
40	Rice Lake	Oneida	
41	Fourmile Island Rookery	Dodge	
42	Summerton Bog	Marquette	
43	Poppy's Rock	Waupaca	
44	Durst Rockshelter	Sauk	
45	Pine Hollow	Sauk	
46	VanderBloemen Bog	Manitowoc	
47	Sister Islands	Door	
48	Cherney Maribel Caves	Manitowoc	
49	Black Tern Bog	Vilas	
50	Two Creeks Buried Forest	Manitowoc	
51	Waupun Park Maple Forest	Fond Du Lac	
52	Lodde's Mill Bluff	Sauk	
53	New Munster Bog Island	Kenosha	
54	Chiwaukee Prairie	Kenosha	
55	Marinette County Beech Forest	Marinette	
56	Sander's Park Hardwoods	Racine	
57	Toft Point	Door	
58	Oliver Prairie	Green	
59	Spruce Lake Bog	Fond du Lac	
60	Tamarack Creek Bog	Trempealeau	
61	Cedarburg Beech Woods	Ozaukee	
62	Silver Lake Bog	Kenosha	
63	Waterloo Prairie	Dodge	
64	Swenson Wet Prairie	Rock	
65	Solon Springs Sharptail Barrens	Douglas	
66	Eagle Oak Opening	Waukesha	
67	Fairy Chasm	Ozaukee	
68	Avoca Prairie and Savanna	Iowa	
69	Blue River Sand Barrens	Grant	
70	Lawrence Creek	Marquette	
71	Kohler Park Dunes	Sheboygan	
72	Cady's Marsh	Sauk	
73	Gibraltar Rock	Columbia	
74	Blue Hills Felsenmeer	Rusk	
75	Ableman's Gorge	Sauk	
76	Five-Mile Bluff Prairie	Pepin	
77	Blackhawk Island State Natural Area	Juneau	
78	Flora Spring Pond	Langlade	
79	Holmboe Conifer Forest	Oneida	
80	Hub City Bog	Richland	
81	Nelson-Trevino Bottoms	Buffalo	
82	Baxter's Hollow	Sauk	
83	Moquah Barrens	Bayfield	
84	Schmidt Maple Woods	Clark	
85	Buena Vista Prairie Chicken Meadow	Portage	
86	Audubon Goose Pond	Columbia	
87	Point Beach Ridges	Manitowoc	
88	Kettle Moraine Low Prairie	Waukesha	
89	Wyalusing Walnut Forest	Grant	
90	Newport Conifer-Hardwoods	Door	
91	Honey Creek	Sauk	
92	Miscauno Cedar Swamp	Marinette	
93	Milwaukee River and Swamp	Fond du Lac	
94	Spring Lake	Fond du Lac	
95	Renak-Polak Maple-Beech Woods	Racine	
96	Muir Park	Marquette	
97	South Bluff/Devil's Nose	Sauk	
98	East Bluff	Sauk	
99	Karcher Springs	Racine	
100	Fountain Creek Wet Prairie	Green Lake	
101	Tellock's Hill Woods	Waupaca	
102	Spring Green Preserve	Sauk	
103	Lampson Moraine Pines	Washburn	
104	Dunbar Barrens	Marinette	
105	Natural Bridge and Rockshelter	Sauk	
106	Peat Lake	Kenosha	
107	Johnson Lake Barrens and Springs	Vilas	
108	Lost Canoe	Vilas	
109	Dells of the Eau Claire River	Marathon	
110	Jackson Harbor Ridges	Door	
111	Bean Lake	Jefferson	
112	Muskego Park Hardwoods	Waukesha	
113	Newark Road Prairie	Rock	
114	Waubesa Wetlands	Dane	
115	Gobler Lake	Oneida	
116	Dory's Bog and Hunt Hill	Washburn	
117	Scott Lake and Shelp Lake	Forest	
118	Giant White Pine Grove	Forest	
119	Franklin and Butternut Lakes	Forest	
120	Cherry Lake Sedge Meadow	Racine	
121	Plagge Woods	Chippewa	
122	Beulah Bog	Walworth	
123	Comstock Bog-Meadow	Marquette	
124	Moose Lake	Iron	
125	Mud Lake	Door	
126	Bear Creek Cave	Sauk	
127	Aurora Lake	Vilas	
128	Ottawa Lake Fen	Waukesha	
129	Jung Hemlock-Beech Forest	Shawano	
130	Cherokee Marsh	Dane	
131	Powers Bluff Maple Woods	Wood	
132	Young Prairie	Walworth	
133	Gullickson's Glen	Jackson	
134	Putnam Park	Eau Claire	
135	Kewaskum Maple-Oak Woods	Washington	
136	Trenton Bluff Prairie	Pierce	
137	Bark Bay Slough	Bayfield	
138	Lulu Lake	Walworth	
139	Muralt Bluff Prairie	Green	
140	Totagatic Highlands Hemlocks	Washburn	
141	Mud Lake Bog	Waupaca	
142	Mazomanie Bottoms	Dane	
143	Mayville Ledge Beech-Maple Woods	Dodge	
144	Neda Mine	Dodge	
145	Apple River Canyon	Saint Croix	
146	Empire Prairies	Dane	
147	Sterling Barrens	Polk	
148	St. Croix Ash Swamp	Burnett	
149	Brant Brook Pines	Burnett	
150	Ekdall Wetlands	Burnett	
151	Norway Point Bottomlands	Burnett	
152	Kohler-Peet Barrens and Cedar Swamp	Burnett	
153	Genesee Oak Opening and Fen	Waukesha	
154	Port Wing Boreal Forest	Bayfield	
155	Oshkosh-Larsen Trail Prairies	Winnebago	
156	Big Bay Sand Spit and Bog	Ashland	
157	Olson Oak Woods	Dane	
158	Keller Whitcomb Creek Woods	Waupaca	
159	Mukwa Bottomland Forest	Waupaca	
160	Brule River Boreal Forest	Douglas	
161	Brule Glacial Spillway	Douglas	
162	Kinnickinnic River Gorge and Delta	Pierce	
163	Oxbow Rapids, Upper Wolf River	Langlade	
164	Dalles of the St. Croix River	Polk	
165	Interstate Lowland Forest	Polk	
166	Sohlberg Silver Lake	Adams	
167	Belmont Mound Woods	Lafayette	
168	Snapper Prairie	Jefferson	
169	Kurtz Woods	Ozaukee	
170	Rush Creek	Crawford	
171	Sajdak Springs	Bayfield	
172	Puchyan Prairie	Green Lake	
173	Whitman Bottoms Floodplain Forest	Buffalo	
174	Tula Lake	Polk	
175	Whitefish Dunes	Door	
176	High Cliff Escarpment	Calumet	
177	Battle Bluff Prairie	Vernon	
178	Bass Lake Fen	Waushara	
179	Myklebust Lake	Waupaca	
180	Shaky Lake	Outagamie	
181	New Hope Pines	Portage	
182	Dewey Marsh	Portage	
183	Roche-A-Cri Mound	Adams	
184	La Crosse River Trail Prairies	La Crosse	
185	Stone Lake Pines	Oneida	
186	Nixon Lake	Vilas	
187	Frog Lake and Pines	Iron	
188	Wind Pudding Lake	Oneida	
189	Day Lake	Vilas	
190	Oakfield Ledge	Fond du Lac	
191	Kissick Alkaline Bog Lake	Sawyer	
192	Washburn Marsh	Jackson	
193	Robinson Creek Pines	Jackson	
194	Pope Lake	Waupaca	
195	Ipswich Prairie	Grant	
196	Black Lake Bog	Douglas	
197	Riveredge Creek and Ephemeral Pond	Ozaukee	
198	Lost Lake	Columbia	
199	Kessler Railroad Prairie	Rock	
200	Pewits Nest	Sauk	
201	Coon Creek Cliffs	Vernon	
202	Rush River Delta	Pierce	
203	Cranberry Creek Mound Group	Juneau	
204	Marshall's Point	Door	
205	Morgan Coulee Prairie	Pierce	
206	McGilvra Woods	Sauk	
207	Berlin Fen	Green Lake	
208	Sapa Spruce Bog	Ozaukee	
209	Pickerel Lake Fen	Walworth	
210	Black Earth Rettenmund Prairie	Dane	
211	Bass Lake Preserve	Iron	
212	Baraboo River Floodplain Forest	Columbia	
213	Clover Valley Fen	Walworth	
214	Hortonville Bog	Outagamie	
215	Red Cedar Lake	Jefferson	
216	Patterson Hemlocks	Oneida	
217	Ferry Bluff	Sauk	
218	Mink River Estuary	Door	
219	Lima Bog	Rock	
220	Rocky Run Oak Savanna	Columbia	
221	Wauzeka Bottoms	Crawford	
222	Eureka Maple Woods	Monroe	
223	Observatory Hill	Marquette	
224	Mud Lake - Radley Creek Savanna	Waupaca	
225	Koro Prairie	Winnebago	
226	Plainfield Tunnel Channel Lakes	Waushara	
227	Pickerel Lake	Portage	
228	Fort McCoy Barrens	Monroe	
229	Kettle Moraine Oak Opening	Jefferson	
230	C.F. Messinger Dry Prairie & Savanna Preserve	Walworth	
231	Ward/Swartz Decatur Woods	Green	
232	Brooks Bluff	Adams	
233	Moonlight Bay Bedrock Beach	Door	
234	Bloch Oxbow	Marinette	
235	Big Eau Pleine Woods	Marathon	
236	Nine Mile Island	Dunn	
237	Dunn Lake	Vilas	
238	Atkins Lake	Forest	
239	Tomahawk River Pines	Oneida	
240	Otter Creek Oak Barrens	Dunn	
241	Jay Creek Pine Forest	Jackson	
242	Hook Lake Bog	Dane	
243	Ketchum Creek Pines	Jackson	
244	Squirrel River Pines	Oneida	
245	Adiantum Woods	Grant	
246	Arena Pines and Sand Barrens	Iowa	
247	Bakken's Pond	Sauk	
248	Mazomanie Oak Barrens	Dane	
249	Richwood Bottoms	Richland	
250	Smith Slough and Sand Prairie	Richland	
251	Woodman Lake Sand Prairie & Dead Lake	Grant	
252	Woodland Dunes	Manitowoc	
253	Milwaukee River Floodplain Forest	Washington	
254	Kettle Hole Woods	Sheboygan	
255	Crooked Lake Wetlands	Fond du Lac	
256	Milwaukee River Tamarack Lowlands & Dundee Kame	Fond du Lac	
257	Butler Lake and Flynn's Spring	Sheboygan	
258	Johnson Hill Kame	Sheboygan	
259	Kettle Moraine Red Oaks	Sheboygan	
260	Pecatonica River Woods	Iowa	
261	Gasner Hollow Prairie	Grant	
262	Snow Bottoms	Grant	
263	Caryville Savanna	Dunn	
264	Mary Lake	Vilas	
265	Upper Fox Headwaters	Marquette	
266	Apostle Islands Maritime Forests	Ashland	
267	Apostle Islands Maritime Cliffs	Ashland	
268	Apostle Islands Sandscapes	Ashland	
269	Apostle Islands Critical Species	Ashland	
270	Bass Hollow	Juneau	
271	Bluff Creek	Walworth	
272	Quincy Bluff and Wetlands	Adams	
273	Plum Creek Woods	Pierce	
274	Lost Creek Bog	Bayfield	
275	Bibon Swamp	Bayfield	
276	Coffey Swamp	Door	
277	Tranus Lake	Washburn	
278	Jackson Marsh	Washington	
279	Gotham Jack Pine Barrens	Richland	
280	Bay City Mine	Pierce	
281	Snake Creek Fen	Green Lake	
282	Fox Maple Woods	Florence	
283	Dells of the Wisconsin River	Adams	
284	Baileys Harbor Boreal Forest and Wetlands	Door	
285	Blue Swamp	Clark	
286	Bear Caves	Langlade	
287	Bogus Swamp	Langlade	
288	Minito Lake	Langlade	
289	Rock River Prairie	Rock	
290	Spread Eagle Barrens	Florence	
291	Turtle-Flambeau Patterned Bog	Iron	
292	Chequamegon Hardwoods	Ashland	
293	McCarthy Lake and Cedars	Ashland	
294	Memorial Grove Hemlocks	Price	
295	Spider Lake	Ashland	
296	Tucker Lake Hemlocks	Price	
297	Twin Lakes Bog	Taylor	
298	Orion Mussel Bed	Richland	
299	Sugar River Wetlands	Dane	
300	Dwight's Point and Pokegama Wetlands	Douglas	
301	Barney Creek	Oconto	
302	Bastile Lake	Forest	
303	Brule River Cliffs	Florence	
304	Glocke Lake	Oconto	
305	Grandma Lake Wetlands	Florence	
306	Hagar Mountain	Oconto	
307	McCaslin Mountain	Forest	
308	Blackjack Springs	Vilas	
309	Snow Falls Creek	Oconto	
310	Wisconsin Slough	Florence	
311	Deansville Fen	Dane	
312	Skunk and Foster Lakes	Waupaca	
313	Coon Fork Barrens	Eau Claire	
314	South Fork Barrens	Eau Claire	
315	Pea Creek Sedge Meadow	Eau Claire	
316	Blue River Bluffs	Grant	
317	Belden Swamp	Douglas	
318	Five Mile Barrens (Note: This natural area replaces Buckley Creek Barrens, which was decommissioned)	Douglas	
319	Erickson Creek Forest and Wetlands	Douglas	
320	Nemadji River Floodplain Forest	Douglas	
321	Lake Evelyn	Iron	
322	Hardscrabble Prairie	Lafayette	
323	Bear Lake Sedge Meadow	Barron	
324	Rock Creek Felsenmeer	Barron	
325	Bauer-Brockway Barrens	Jackson	
326	Ridgeway Pine Relict	Iowa	
327	Karner Blue Meadow	Waushara	
328	Oakfield Railroad Prairie	Fond du Lac	
329	Centennial Bedrock Glade	Polk	
330	Page Creek Marsh	Marquette	
331	Rush Lake	Winnebago	
332	Red Banks Alvar	Brown	
333	Lunch Creek Wetlands	Waushara	
334	Hogback Prairies	Crawford	
335	Kangaroo Lake	Door	
336	Caroline Lake	Iron	
337	Cassville Bluffs - Roe Unit	Grant	
338	Sugar Creek Bluffs	Crawford	
339	Diamond Lake	Taylor	
340	Lawrence Prairie	Rock	
341	Limery Ridge Savanna	Crawford	
342	Lower Chippewa River	Buffalo	
343	Princeton Prairie	Green Lake	
344	Springstead Muskeg	Iron	
345	Stockbridge Ledge Woods	Calumet	
346	Trempealeau River Meadow	Buffalo	
347	Weir White Oaks	Lafayette	
348	York Prairie	Green	
349	Eagle Centre Prairie	Waukesha	
350	Martin’s Woods	Waukesha	
351	Cudahy Woods	Milwaukee	
352	Warnimont Bluff Fens	Milwaukee	
353	Huiras Lake	Ozaukee	
354	Kickapoo Valley Reserve	Vernon	
355	Germain Hemlocks	Oneida	
356	Trempealeau Mountain	Trempealeau	
357	Great River Trail Prairies	La Crosse	
358	Buffalo River Trail Prairies	Jackson	
359	Mill Bluff	Monroe	
360	Buckhorn Barrens (at Buckhorn State Park)	Juneau	
361	Yellow River Oxbows	Juneau	
362	Roche-A-Cri Woods	Adams	
363	Yellowstone Savanna	Lafayette	
364	Belmont Prairie	Lafayette	
365	Emmons Creek Barrens	Portage	
366	Germania Wet Prairie	Marquette	
367	White River Sedge Meadow	Green Lake	
368	White River Prairie/Tamaracks	Green Lake	
369	Bear Creek Sedge Meadow	Richland	
370	Mecan Springs	Waushara	
371	Hulburt Creek Woods	Sauk	
372	Portland Maples	Monroe	
373	Mead Conifer Bogs	Wood	
374	Lodi Marsh	Dane	
375	Goose Lake Drumlins	Dane	
376	Sand Creek Pines	Monroe	
377	Bayshore Blufflands	Door	
378	Ellison Bluff	Door	
379	Europe Bay Woods	Door	
380	Holland Red Maple Swamp	Brown	
381	North Bay	Door	
382	Rock Island Woods	Door	
383	White Cliff Fen and Forest	Door	
384	Big Island	Burnett	
385	Farmington Bottoms	Polk	
386	Osceola Bedrock Glades	Polk	
387	St. Croix Seeps	Burnett	
388	Little Wolf River	Waupaca	
389	Jefferson Tamarack Swamp	Jefferson	
390	Lemonweir Bottomland Hardwood Forest	Juneau	
391	Big and Little Marsh	Door	
392	Blomberg Lake and Woods State Natural Area	Burnett	
393	Fish Lake Meadow	Burnett	
394	Fish Lake Pines	Burnett	
395	Reed Lake Meadow	Burnett	
396	Loon Lake Woods	Barron	
397	New Auburn Sedge Meadow	Barron	
398	Big Manitou Falls and Gorge	Douglas	
399	Copper Falls	Ashland	
400	Mott's Ravine	Douglas	
401	Brule Rush Lake	Douglas	
402	Bear Beach	Douglas	
403	Thorp Pond	Door	
404	Lawrence Lake	Langlade	
405	Barneveld Prairie	Iowa	
406	Mirror Lake Pine Oak Forest	Sauk	
407	Fern Dell Gorge	Sauk	
408	Ancient Aztalan Village	Jefferson	
409	Franklin Savanna	Milwaukee	
410	Maiden Rock Bluff	Pepin	
411	Border Lakes	Vilas	
412	Red Cedar River Savanna	Dunn	
413	Detroit Harbor	Door	
414	Rhine Center Bog	Sheboygan	
415	Bergen Bluffs	Vernon	
416	Fair Meadows	Rock	
417	Mukwonago River	Waukesha	
418	Romance Prairie	Vernon	
419	Barksdale Ponds	Bayfield	
420	St Peter's Dome	Ashland	
421	Brunsweiler River and Mineral Lake	Ashland	
422	North Country Trail Hardwoods	Bayfield	
423	English Lake Hemlocks	Ashland	
424	Dry Lake	Ashland	
425	Lake Owen Hardwoods	Bayfield	
426	Eighteen Mile Creek	Bayfield	
427	Drummond Woods	Bayfield	
428	Bear Lake Slough	Ashland	
429	Upper Brunet River	Sawyer	
430	East Fork Chippewa River	Ashland	
431	Snoose Creek	Ashland	
432	No-Name Lake	Sawyer	
433	Black Creek Bog	Ashland	
434	Ghost Lake	Sawyer	
435	Foulds Creek	Price	
436	Wilson Lake	Bayfield	
437	Little Willow Drumlin	Price	
438	Moose River Cedar Hills	Sawyer	
439	Riley Lake	Price	
440	Chippewa Trail	Vilas	
441	Argonne Experimental Forest	Forest	
442	Kentuck Lake	Vilas	
443	Alvin Creek Headwaters	Forest	
444	Rat Lake Swamp and Popple River Headwaters	Forest	
445	Echo Lake	Forest	
446	Pat Shay Lake	Forest	
447	Wabikon Lake	Forest	
448	North Otter Creek	Forest	
449	Anvil Lake Trail	Forest	
450	Camp 3 Lake	Forest	
451	Lauterman Lake	Florence	
452	Popple River Corridor	Florence	
453	Hedmark Pines	Florence	
454	Diamond Roof	Langlade	
455	Deer Mountain	Forest	
456	Wheeler Lake	Florence	
457	Woods Creek	Florence	
458	Spring Brook Drumlins	Ashland	
459	Thornapple Hemlocks	Sawyer	
460	Elk River Valley	Price	
461	Mondeaux Hardwoods	Taylor	
462	Lost Lake Esker	Taylor	
463	Bear Creek Hemlocks	Taylor	
464	Kidrick Swamp	Taylor	
465	Silver Creek & Mondeaux River	Taylor	
466	Brush Creek Hemlocks	Taylor	
467	Yellow River Ice-walled Lake Plain	Taylor	
468	Richter Lake Hemlocks	Taylor	
469	Perkinstown Hemlocks	Taylor	
470	Camp Nine Pines	Bayfield	
471	Bearsdale Creek & Hyatt Springs	Bayfield	
472	Northeast Lake	Bayfield	
473	Mountain Lake	Bayfield	
474	Fairyland	Bayfield	
475	Rock Lake	Bayfield	
476	Namekagon Fen	Bayfield	
477	Kieper Creek	Florence	
478	Beaver Creek	Vilas	
479	Haymeadow Creek	Vilas	
480	Headwater Lakes	Vilas	
481	Doering Woods	Price	
482	Haymeadow Flowage	Forest	
483	Waupee Lake Swamp	Oconto	
484	Nelligan Lake	Oconto	
485	Sunrise Lake	Oconto	
486	Tar Dam Pines	Oconto	
487	Bonita Country	Oconto	
488	Thunder River Swamp	Oconto	
489	North Branch Bottoms	Oconto	
490	Forbes Springs	Oconto	
491	Thunder Mountain	Oconto	
492	LaFave Swamp	Oconto	
493	Priest Rock	Oconto	
494	Pirus Road Swamp	Taylor	
495	Camp Five Lake	Oconto	
496	Cathedral Pines	Oconto	
497	Battle Creek Hemlocks	Oconto	
498	South Branch Beech Grove	Oconto	
499	Inch Lake	Bayfield	
500	Lake Laura Hardwoods	Vilas	
501	Catherine Lake Hemlock-Hardwoods	Iron	
502	DuPage Lake Peatlands	Iron	
503	Papoose Creek Pines	Vilas	
504	Rice Creek	Vilas	
505	Trout River	Vilas	
506	Camp Lake and Pines	Vilas	
507	Devine Lake & Mishonagon Creek	Vilas	
508	Allequash Lake and Pines	Vilas	
509	Lake Alva Birch-Hemlock	Vilas	
510	Tomahawk Lake Hemlocks	Oneida	
511	Two Lakes Pine-Oak Forest	Oneida	
512	Big Swamp	Oneida	
513	Rainbow Wetlands	Oneida	
514	Shallow Lake	Oneida	
515	Kroenke Lake	Shawano	
516	Pokegama Carnegie Wetlands	Douglas	
517	Empire Swamp	Douglas	
518	Blueberry Swamp	Douglas	
519	Flat Lake	Douglas	
520	Goose Lake	Douglas	
521	Owl Creek Fen Savanna	Wood	
522	Skunk Creek Woods	Wood	
523	Red Oak Bottoms	Wood	
524	Hiles Wetlands	Wood	
525	North Fork Eau Claire River	Eau Claire	
526	Canoe Landing Prairie	Eau Claire	
527	Hunting River Alders	Langlade	
528	Kelly Lynn Bog	Langlade	
529	Bear Bluff	Jackson	
530	Bohn Lake	Waushara	
531	Jones Lake	Bayfield	
532	Rib Mountain Talus Forest	Marathon	
533	Lower Narrows	Sauk	
534	Nourse Sugarbush	Bayfield	
535	Hemlock Draw	Sauk	
536	Wolf River Bottoms	Shawano	
537	Spur Lake	Oneida	
538	Rose Lake	Jefferson	
539	Haley Creek Swamp	Florence	
540	Spruce Grouse Swamp	Vilas	
541	Schluckebier Prairie	Sauk	
542	Tunnelville Cliffs	Vernon	
543	Logan Creek	Door	
544	Meridian Park	Door	
545	Pan Hollow	Sauk	
546	French Creek Fen	Columbia	
547	Springvale Wet Prairie	Columbia	
548	Grassy Lake	Columbia	
549	Pine Island Savanna	Columbia	
550	Town Corner Cedars	Marinette	
551	Pleasant Valley Conservancy	Dane	
552	Jump River Woods	Price	
553	Holland Sand Prairie	La Crosse	
554	Little Lake	Door	
555	Lily Lake	Lincoln	
556	Lake Lackawanna	Oconto	
557	Johnson Falls	Marinette	
558	Kirby Lake Hardwoods	Marinette	
559	Cave Point-Clay Banks	Door	
560	Kelly Lake Hemlocks	Oconto	
561	Lake Noquebay Sedge Meadow	Marinette	
562	Peshtigo Harbor Lacustrine Forest	Marinette	
563	Peshtigo River Delta Marshes	Marinette	
564	Peshtigo Brook Meadow and Woods	Oconto	
565	North Bend Wet Prairie	Jackson	
566	Half Moon Bottoms	Jackson	
567	Black River Savanna	Jackson	
568	Van Loon Floodplain Forest	La Crosse	
569	Van Loon Floodplain Savanna	La Crosse	
570	Kickapoo Wild Woods	Crawford	
571	Muddy Creek Sedge Meadow	Dunn	
572	Big Beaver Meadow	Dunn	
573	Jackson Creek Woods	Waupaca	
574	Plover River Woods	Marathon	
575	Suk Cerney Peatlands	Juneau	
576	Meadow Valley Barrens	Juneau	
577	Blueberry Trail	Juneau	
578	Kingston Pines	Juneau	
579	Hog Island Tamaracks	Juneau	
580	Yellow River Floodplain Forest	Wood	
581	Wedde Creek Savanna	Marquette	
582	Mecan River Pine-Oak Forest	Marquette	
583	Kinnickinnic Wet Prairie	Saint Croix	
584	Upper Little Wolf	Portage	
585	Bradley Creek Swamp Conifers	Portage	
586	Flume Creek Cedars	Portage	
587	Flambeau Wetlands	Iron	
588	Lower Tomahawk River Pines	Oneida	
589	Swamp Creek Fen	Langlade	
590	Crandon Ribbed Fen	Forest	
591	Borah Creek Prairie	Grant	
592	Tunnel Channel Woods	Polk	
593	Straight Lake Tamarack Fen	Polk	
594	Sugar Camp Hemlocks	Oneida	
595	Island Lake Hemlocks	Iron	
596	Berg Prairie and Billy Goat Ridge	La Crosse	
597	Northeast Coulee Oak Woodland	La Crosse	
598	Big Swamp Tamarack Fen	Buffalo	
599	Lake Helane	Sawyer	
600	Standing Cedars	Polk	
601	Hawkins Hemlock-Hardwood Forest	Rusk	
602	Marsh Miller Cedars	Chippewa	
603	Texas Island Woods	Jefferson	
604	Mud Lake Fen and Wet Prairie	Jefferson	
605	Waterloo Quartzite Outcrops	Dodge	
606	Chub and Mud Lake Riverine Marsh	Dodge	
607	Chub Lake Oak Savanna	Dodge	
608	Enterprise Hemlocks	Oneida	
609	Upper Buckatabon Springs	Vilas	
610	Arbutus Oaks	Clark	
611	Catfish Eddy Terraces	Jackson	
612	East Fork of the Black River	Jackson	
613	Starlight Wetlands	Jackson	
614	Upper Black River	Jackson	
615	Wildcat Ridge	Jackson	
616	Jean Brunet Woods	Chippewa	
617	Town Line Lake and Woods	Chippewa	
618	Chippewa Moraine Lakes	Chippewa	
619	North of North Shattuck Lake	Chippewa	
620	Little Bear Hemlocks	Portage	
621	Dunnville Barrens	Dunn	
622	St. Croix Islands	Saint Croix	
623	Cylon	Saint Croix	
624	Borst Valley Sedge Meadow	Trempealeau	
625	Chimney Rock Oak Savanna	Trempealeau	
626	Hawkinson Creek Wet Prairie	Trempealeau	
627	Vosse Coulee	Trempealeau	
628	Lawin Sedge Meadow	Chippewa	
629	One Stone Lake Hemlocks	Oneida	
630	Dorothy Lake	Chippewa	
631	Deer Fly Swamp	Chippewa	
632	Tealey Creek Cedar	Chippewa	
633	Deer Island	Jackson	
634	Glenn Creek Barrens	Jackson	
635	Brockway Ponds	Jackson	
636	Spaulding Fen	Jackson	
637	Millston Sand Barrens	Jackson	
638	Houghton Falls	Bayfield	
639	Apostle Islands Yew Forest	Ashland	
640	Chase Creek	Grant	
641	Allen Creek Wetlands	Jefferson	
642	North Fork Pines	Price	
643	Oxbo Pines	Price	
644	Hanson Lake Wetlands	Sawyer	
645	Swamp Lake	Sawyer	
646	Bass Lake Peatlands	Sawyer	
647	Skinner Creek Hardwoods	Rusk	
648	Magnolia Bluff	Rock	
649	Carver-Roehl Woods	Rock	
650	Upper Kaubashine Creek	Oneida	
651	Ohmart Wetlands	Chippewa	
652	Upper Nemadji River Floodplain Forest	Douglas	
653	LTC Old-Growth Forest	Manitowoc	
654	Smith Drumlin Prairie	Dane	
655	Lehto Lake	Iron	
656	Navarino Cedar Swamp	Shawano	
657	Navarino Sedge Meadow	Shawano	
658	Highway K Woods	Shawano	
659	Deer Creek Tamarack Bog	Outagamie	
660	LaSage Bottoms	Outagamie	
661	Winchester Meadow	Winnebago	
662	Trade River Forest and Wetlands	Polk	
663	French Creek North	Marquette	
664	Mud Lake Forest and Ponds	Columbia	
665	Swan Lake Sedge Meadow & Barrens	Columbia	
666	Swan Lake Tamaracks	Columbia	
667	Swan Lake Wet-Mesic Prairie	Columbia	
668	Koshkonong Corners	Rock	
669	Lake Two Pines	Bayfield	
670	White River Breaks	Bayfield	
671	White River Boreal Forest	Ashland	
672	Nell Lake	Vilas	
673	Van Vliet Hemlocks	Vilas	
674	Parrish Oak Savanna	Dane	
675	Eagle Eye	Vernon	
676	Mullet Creek White Cedar Wetland	Fond du Lac	
677	Nichols Creek Cedars and Springs	Sheboygan	
678	Nichols Creek East Cedars	Sheboygan	
679	Kamrath Creek Forest and Fen	Sheboygan	
680	Albany Sand Prairie and Oak Savanna	Green	
681	Badfish Creek Wet Prairie and Spring Seeps	Dane	
682	Millville Oak Woodlands	Grant	
683	Boscobel Bluffs	Grant	
684	Namekagon Barrens	Washburn	
685	County Line Barrens and Forest	Washburn	
686	Totogan Pines	Washburn	
687	Grand Island	Marinette	
688	Peninsula Niagara Escarpment	Door	
689	Tichagan Springs and Fen	Racine	
690	Beaver Brook	Washburn	
691	Big Rock Pines	Bayfield	
692	North Pikes Creek Boreal Forest	Bayfield	
693	Savage Lake	Florence	
694	Millston Ridge Barrens	Jackson	
695	Komensky Barrens	Jackson	
696	Waazija Haci	Jackson	
697	Wolf River Woods	Langlade	
698	Totagatic Lake and Forest	Bayfield	

== See also ==
- Minnesota Scientific and Natural Areas, a similar program in Minnesota.
