= Brady's Bluff Prairie State Natural Area =

State Natural Area in Wisconsin, US

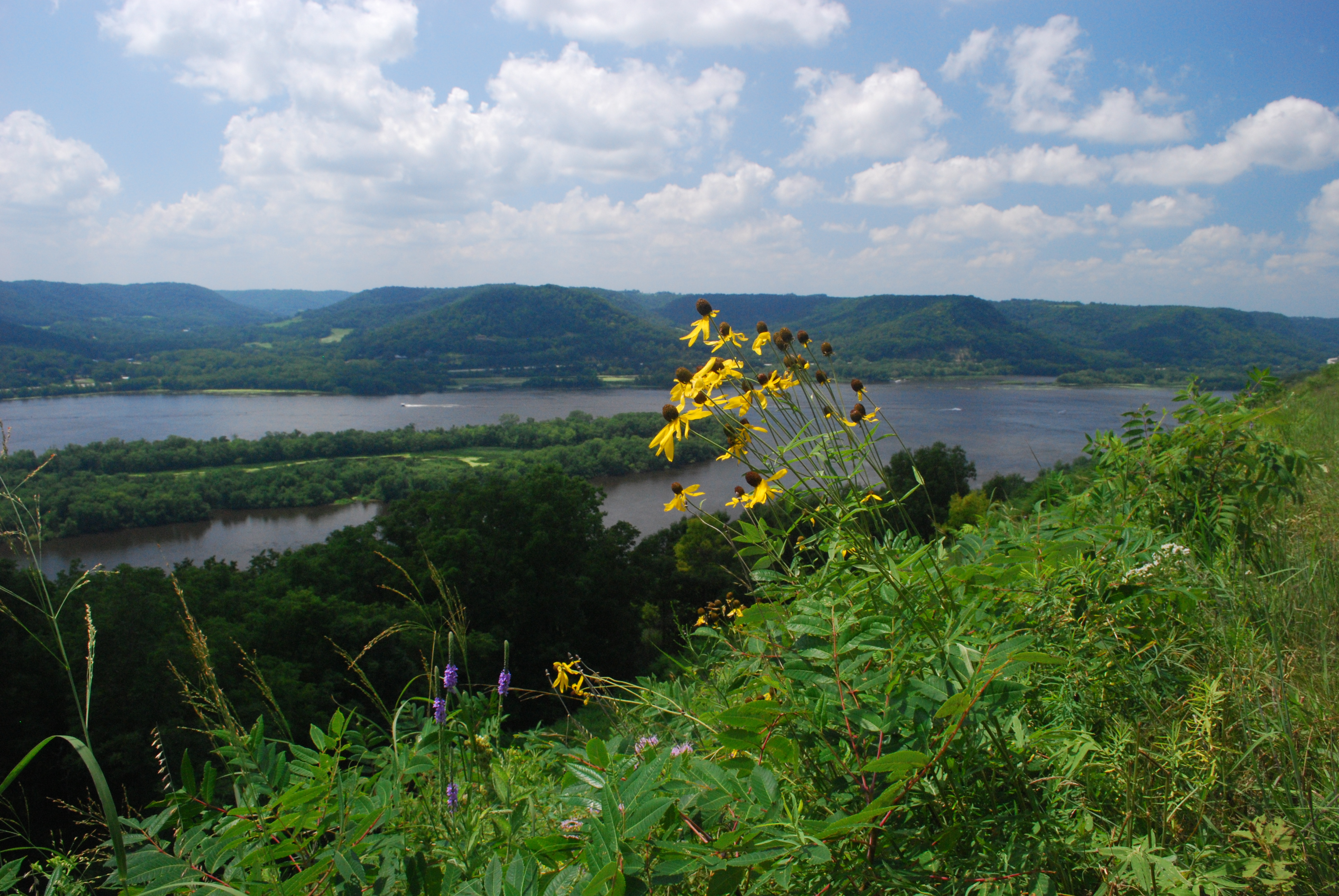
- Mississippi River from Brady's Bluff Prairie

- Location within Wisconsin Location within the United States
- Location: Trempealeau County, Wisconsin
- Coordinates: 44°01′09″N 91°29′02″W
- Area: 57 acres (23 ha)
- Established: 1952
- Owner: Wisconsin Department of Natural Resources
- Website: Official website
- Wisconsin State Natural Areas

Brady's Bluff Prairie State Natural Area is a Wisconsin Department of Natural Resources-designated State Natural Area featuring a steep, southwest-facing bluff rising over 450 feet above the Mississippi River. Over 100 species of prairie plants have been found at this site.

== Location and access ==
Brady's Bluff Prairie State Natural Area is located in western Trempealeau County approximately 2 miles (3.2 km) southwest of Trempealeau. Access is via the Brady's Bluff hiking trail within Perrot State Park.

== Description ==
Brady's Bluff is composed of sandstone capped with Prairie du Chien dolomite. Prairie plants found here include big and little blue-stem, needle grass, hairy grama, silky aster, and rough blazing-star. Several species near their northeastern limits are found here including hairy four-o-clock, prairie larkspur, and plains muhly. Cliff goldenrod (Solidago sciaphila), jeweled shooting-star (Dodecatheon radicatum), and dragon sagewort (Artemesia dranunculus) are among the more rare plants found at this site. Rare butterflies have been documented here including the olive hairstreak (Callophyrs gryneus), striped hairstreak (Satyrium liparops strigosum), and columbine dusky-wing (Erynnis lucilus). The Wisconsin state threatened wing snaggletooth land snail (Gastrocopta procera) has also been identified here.

== Gallery ==
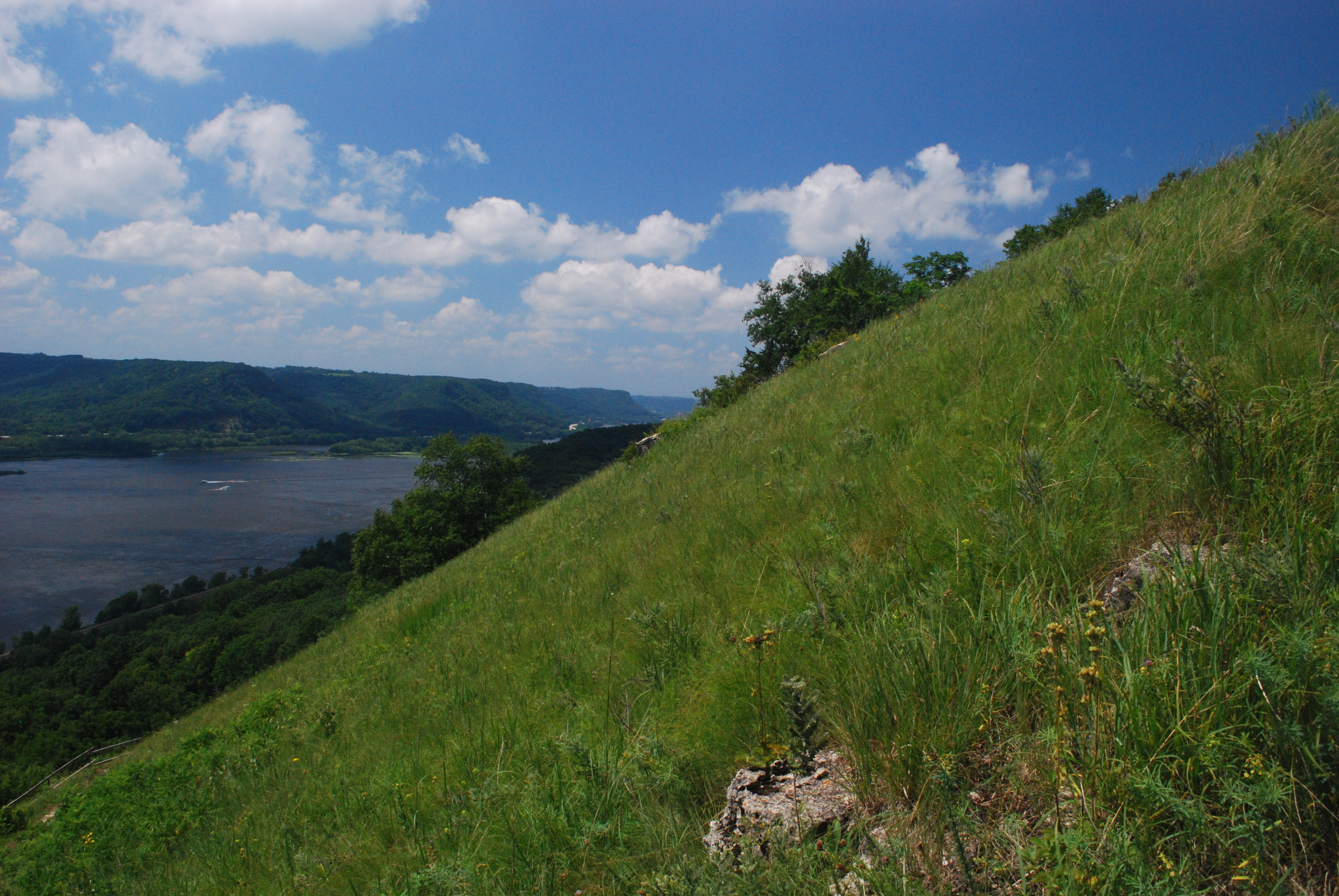
Prairie at Brady's Bluff

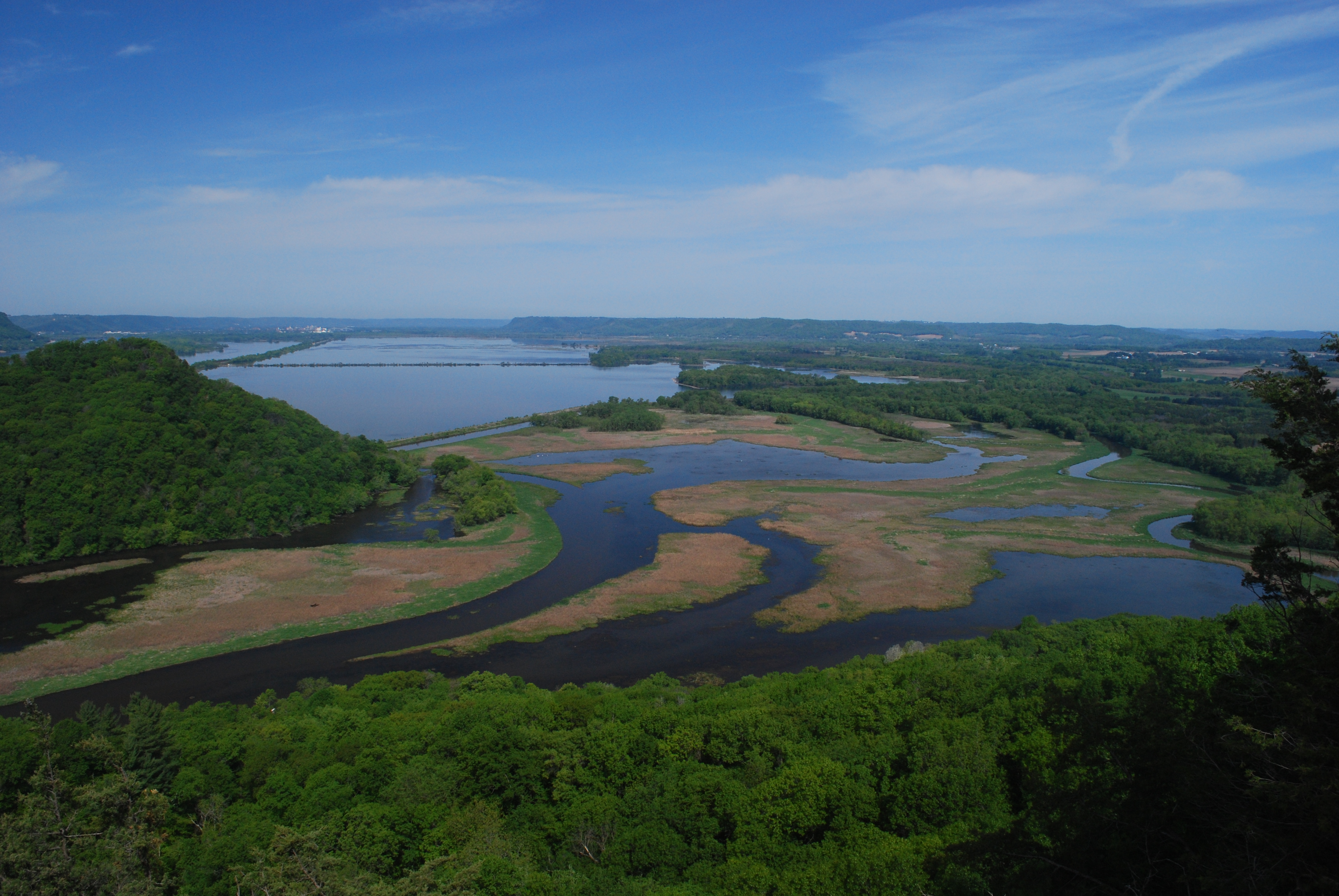
Mississippi River from Brady's Bluff

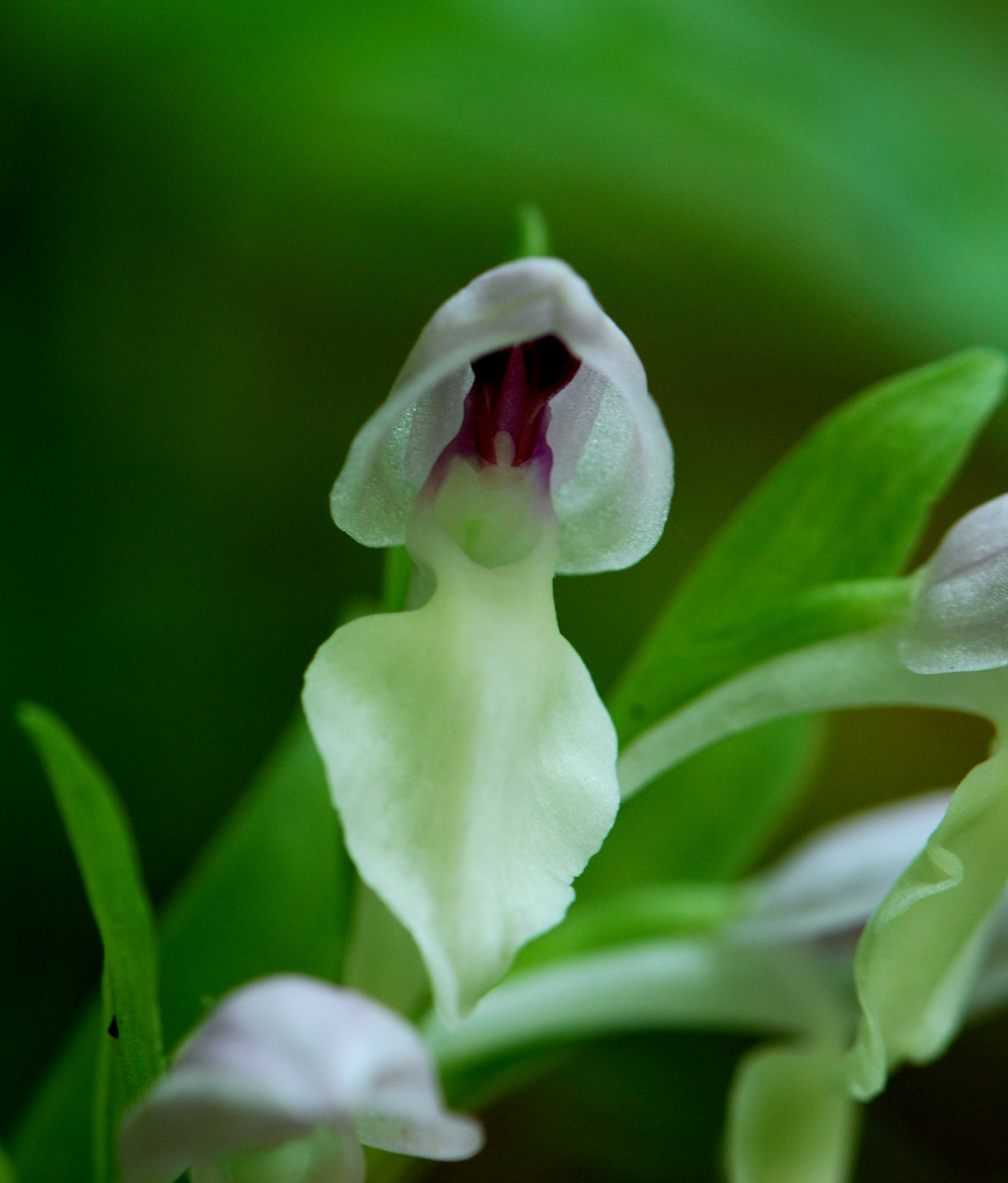
Showy Orchid (Galearis spectabilis)
