= Fourmile Island Rookery State Natural Area =

State Natural Area in Dodge County, Wisconsin

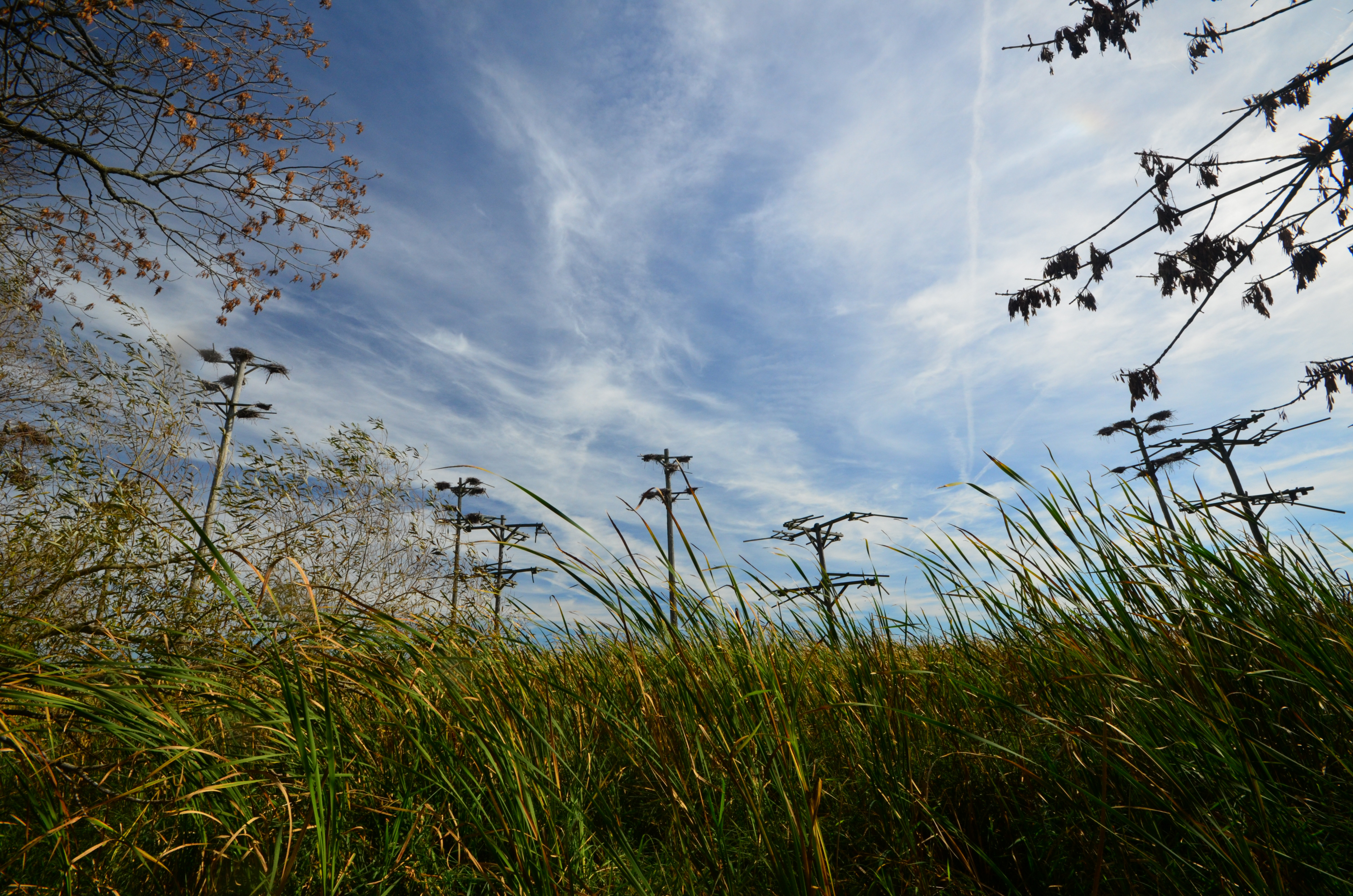
- Nesting platforms

- Location within Wisconsin Location within the United States
- Location: Dodge County, Wisconsin
- Coordinates: 43°29′34″N 88°37′30″W
- Area: 15 acres (6.1 ha)
- Elevation: 860 ft (260 m)
- Established: 1965
- Owner: Wisconsin Department of Natural Resources
- Website: Official website
- Wisconsin State Natural Areas

Fourmile Island Rookery is a Wisconsin Department of Natural Resources-designated State Natural Area located within Horicon State Wildlife Area. It features a narrow, forested 15-acre island that serves as one of the largest heron and gull rookeries in the Midwest.

== Location and access ==
Fourmile Island Rookery State Natural Area is located in central Dodge County approximately 3 miles (4.8 km) north of Horicon. Access is only via Rock River and the island is closed to the public April 1 - August 24.

== Description ==
Fourmile Island is located within Horicon State Wildlife Area which comprises roughly the southern half of Horicon Marsh. The northern portion is managed as the Horicon National Wildlife Refuge. The island supports one of the largest heron and egret rookeries in the Midwest. Oak, basswood, elm, aspen, and cottonwood trees comprise most of the forest. A July 1984 windstorm that toppled nearly 80 trees, Dutch elm disease, and the effects of heron guano, have reduced the number of trees and therefore the nesting habitat on the island. Artificial nesting platforms have been erected to complement the roughly 500 trees that are suitable nesting sites.

== Gallery ==
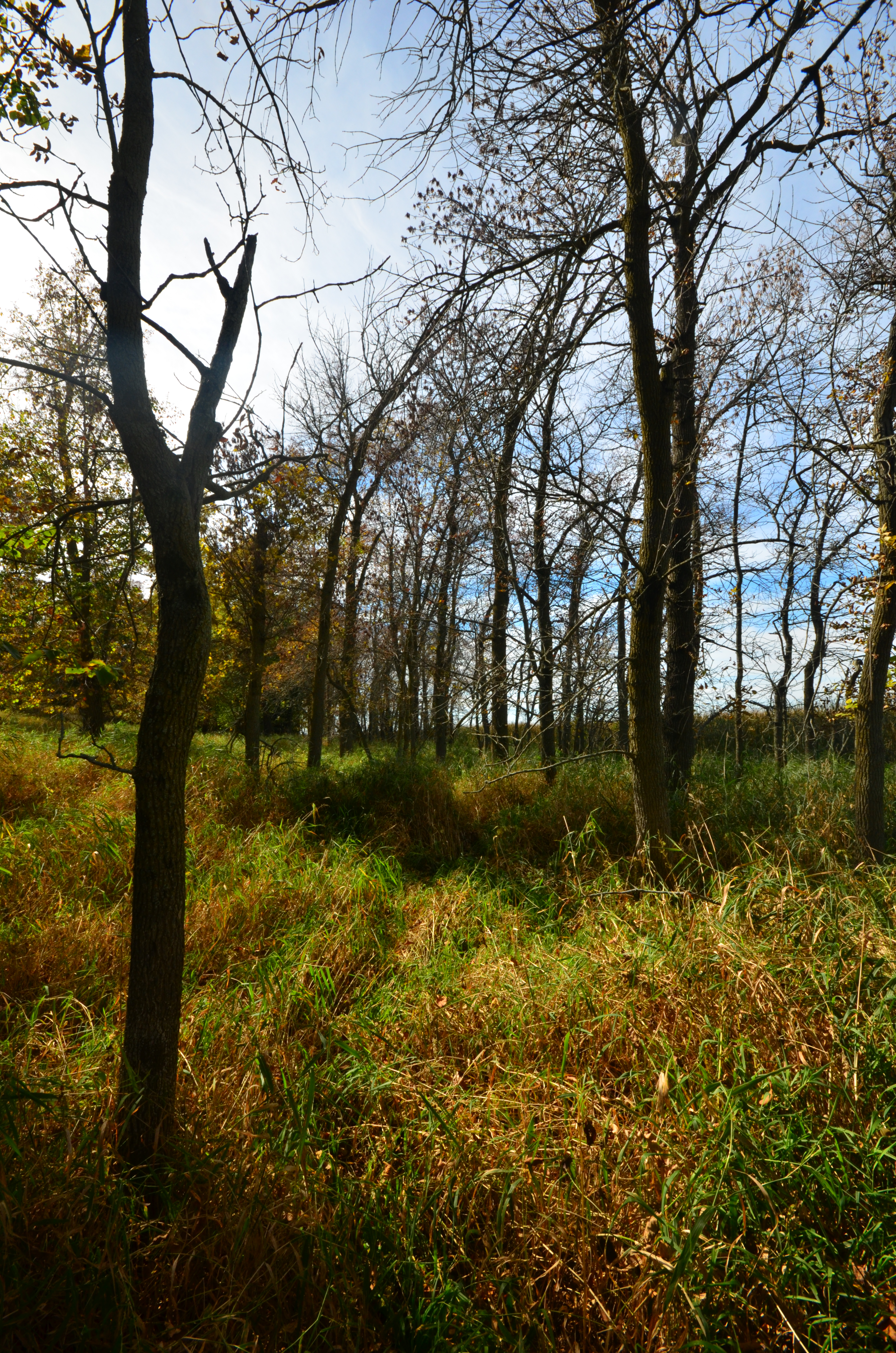
Small Trees in the Forest

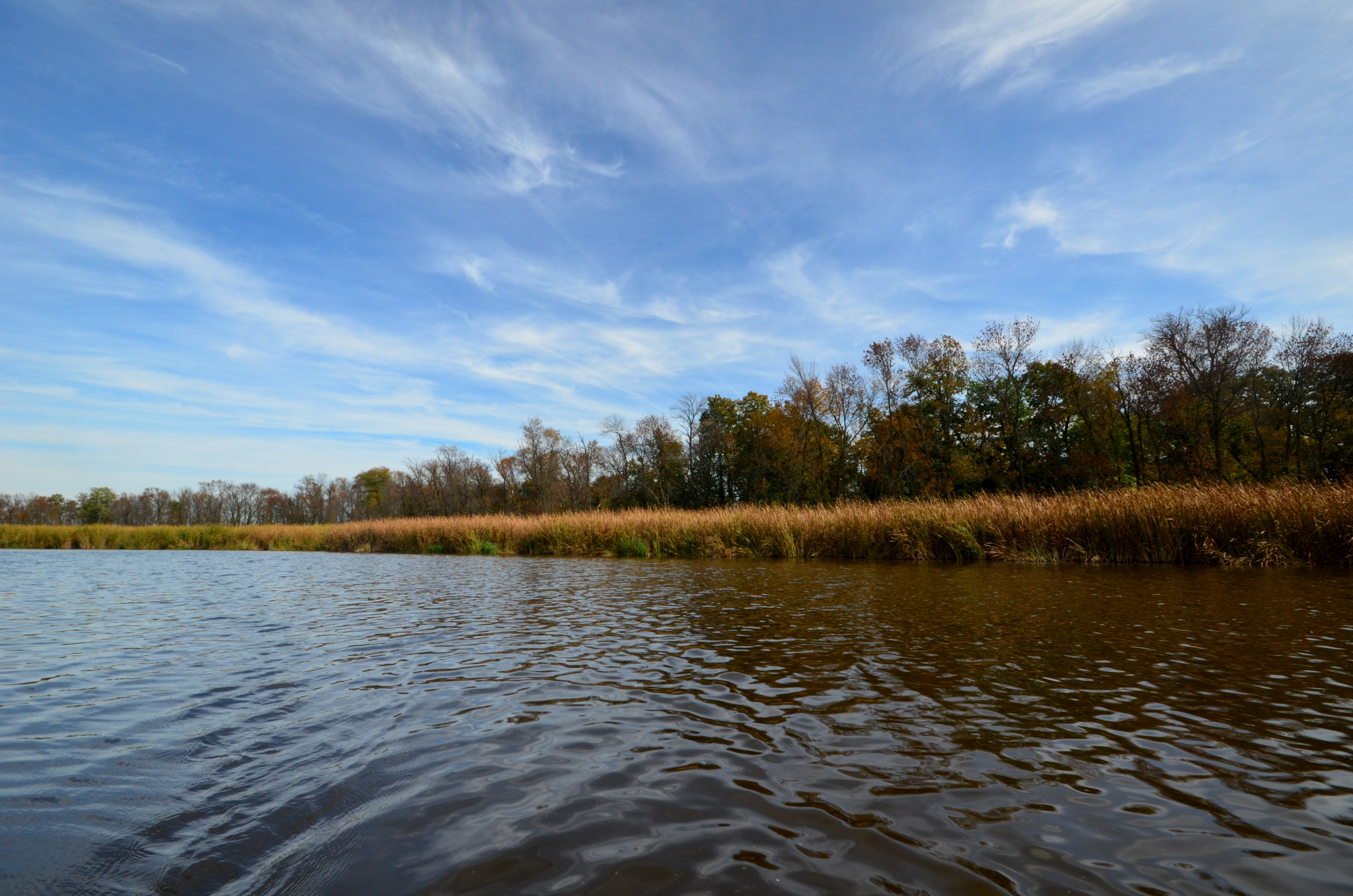
Fourmile Island from the Rock River

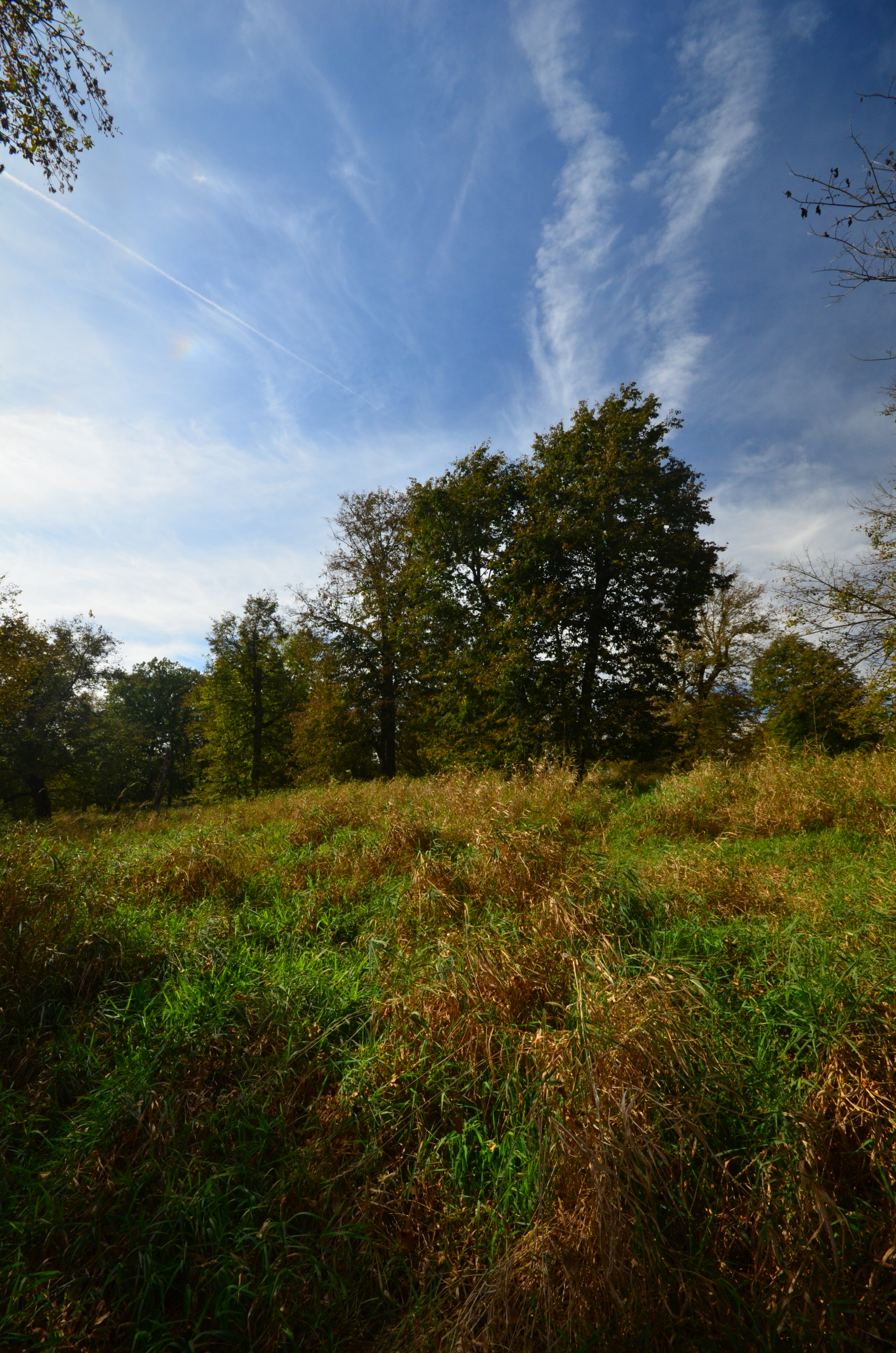
Open Area and Forest

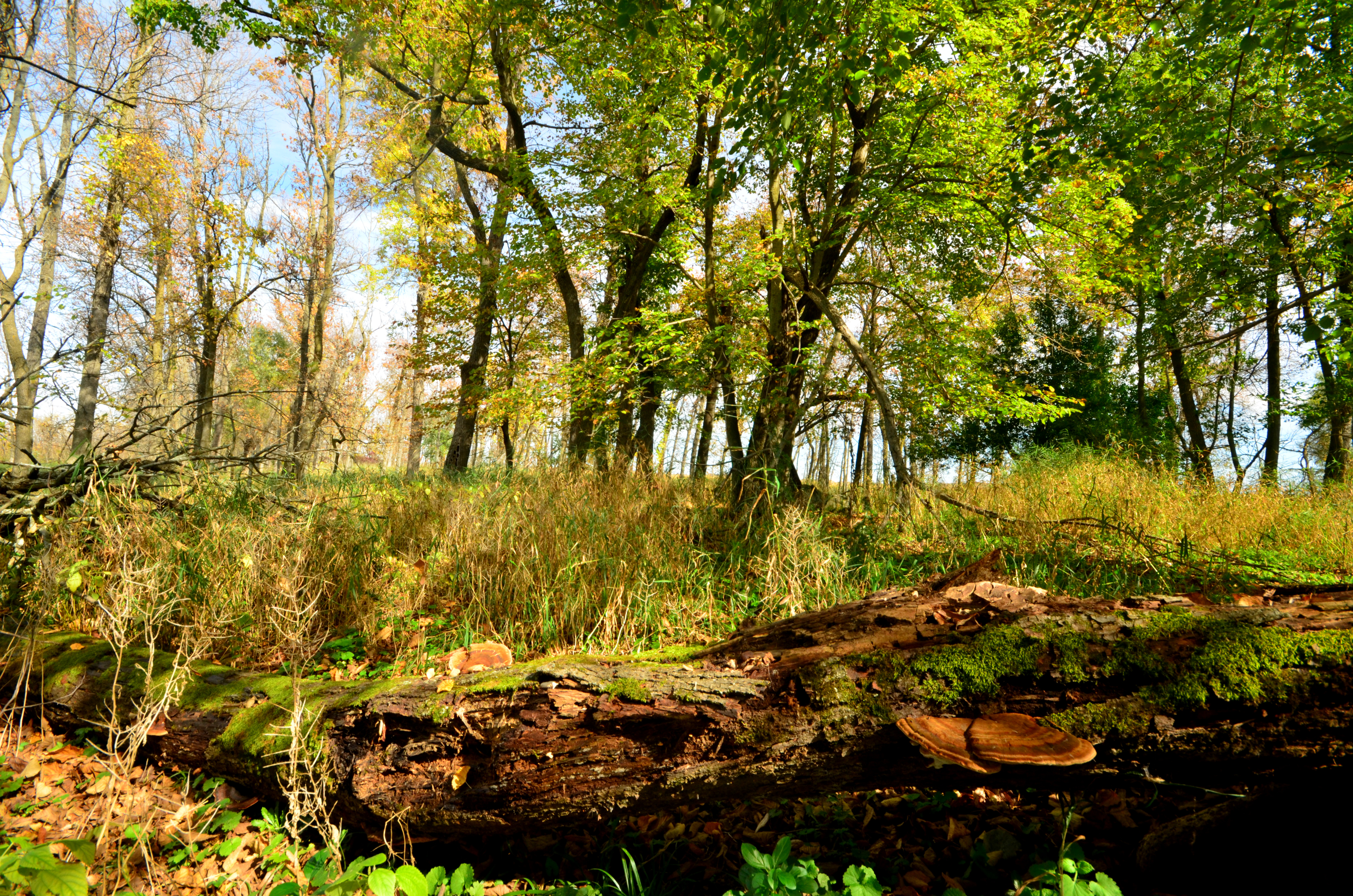
Island Forest
