= Chippewa Moraine Lakes State Natural Area =

State Natural Area in Chippewa County, Wisconsin

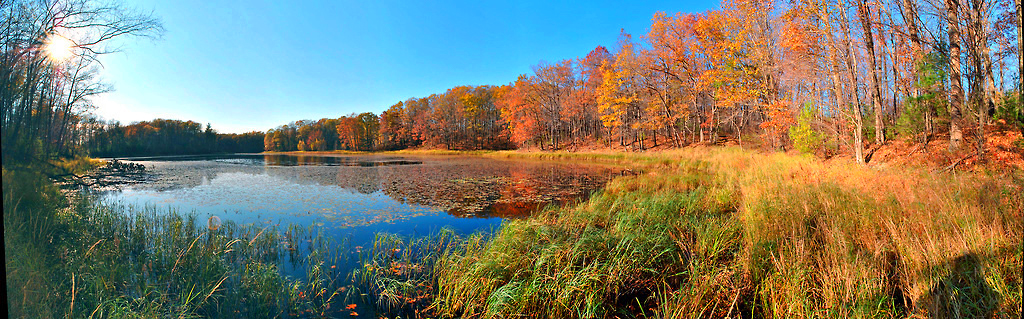

- Location within Wisconsin Location within the United States
- Location: Chippewa County, Wisconsin
- Coordinates: 45°13′N 91°21′W
- Area: 306 acres (124 ha)
- Established: 2010
- Owner: Chippewa County and Wisconsin DNR
- Website: Official website
- Wisconsin State Natural Areas

Chippewa Moraine Lakes is a Wisconsin Department of Natural Resources-designated State Natural Area that comprises nine separate sites, spread out over roughly 30 square miles (78 km^{2}). Each site features a primarily undisturbed lake located within the rough terminal moraine topography of northern Chippewa County. Each lake has its own unique species assemblage due to physical and chemical characteristics of the lake. The nine lakes are:

Camp Lake, a 6-acre (2.4 ha) lake ringed by a floating sphagnum bog mat containing such plant species as white beak rush, narrow-leaved sundew, small cranberry, and grass pink orchid.

Spence Lake, a 12-acre (4.9 ha), acidic bog lake that is the headwaters of Foster Creek. Conifer swamp surrounds the northern part of the lake, hardwood swamp surrounds the central part, while the southern part is largely a sedge meadow, impacted by beaver activity.

Bass Lake #1, a 6-acre (2.4 ha) soft-water seepage lake, with at least one rare plant species present.

Bass Lake #5, an 8-acre (3.2 ha), deep, hard-water seepage lake that is the main headwaters branch of Mud Creek.

Deer Lake, a 6-acre (2.4 ha) seepage lake that is also part of the headwaters of Mud Creek.

Burnt Wagon Lake, a 15-acre (6.1 ha) softwater seepage lake that is landlocked, with no development.

Fishpole Lake, an 11-acre (4.5 ha) meromictic lake. Due to its size, shape, and depth, the lake's water column is permanently thermally stratified, unlike most Wisconsin lakes, leading to unique chemical and biological characteristics.

Plummer Lake, a 41-acre (16.6 ha), deep, hard-water seepage lake.

Little Plummer Lake, a 10-acre (4 ha) wild (no access roads or development) hardwater seepage lake that drains into Plummer Lake.

== Location and access ==
The nine lakes are located within the Chippewa Moraine State Recreation Area (part of the Ice Age National Scientific Reserve), and the Chippewa County Forest, in northern Chippewa County. A network of roads and trails in the Recreation Area and County Forest provide ways to access each of the lakes.

== Lakes ==
Lake	Coordinates (links to maps)	Image
Camp Lake	45°17′27″N 91°19′53″W	
Spence Lake	45°17′15″N 91°18′59″W	
Bass Lake #1	45°13′14″N 91°16′54″W	
Bass Lake #5	45°12′24″N 91°18′35″W	
Deer Lake	45°12′21″N 91°18′08″W	
Burnt Wagon Lake	45°10′58″N 91°20′40″W	
Fishpole Lake	45°11′41″N 91°20′19″W	
Plummer Lake	45°13′04″N 91°20′48″W	
Little Plummer Lake	45°12′54″N 91°21′15″W	
