= Limery Ridge Savanna =

Protected natural area

- Interactive map of Limery Ridge Savanna
- Nearest city: Prairie du Chien
- Coordinates: 43°05′N 91°08′W
- Area: 219 acres (89 ha)
- Established: 2002
- Governing body: Wisconsin Department of Natural Resources

Limery Ridge Savanna is a protected state natural area bordering the city of Prairie du Chien in Crawford County, Wisconsin. It is owned and managed by the Wisconsin Department of Natural Resources (DNR), which established the protected area in 2002.

== Geology, flora, and fauna ==
Alongside adjacent protected land owned by the Mississippi Valley Conservancy, Limery Ridge Savanna contains one of very few undeveloped bluffs overlooking the Mississippi River. A large sandstone cliff is present on the side of the bluff, which hosts fern species such as cliffbrake and walking fern.

Savanna, woodland, and forest are also present within the protected area. All three of these communities are dominated by oak species (bur oak, white oak, and red oak, respectively). The protected area along with nearby bluffs lies on a migratory bird route, and it is considered an important nesting site for songbirds.

== Infrastructure and public access ==
There are currently no trails, facilities, or parking areas within Limery Ridge Savanna. A new "draft management plan" is being considered by the DNR which may alter the management guidelines to allow improved public access to the area. At the very least, the DNR has expressed interest in purchasing or developing a parking area.
