= Dorothy Lake State Natural Area =

Lake and State Natural Area in Wisconsin

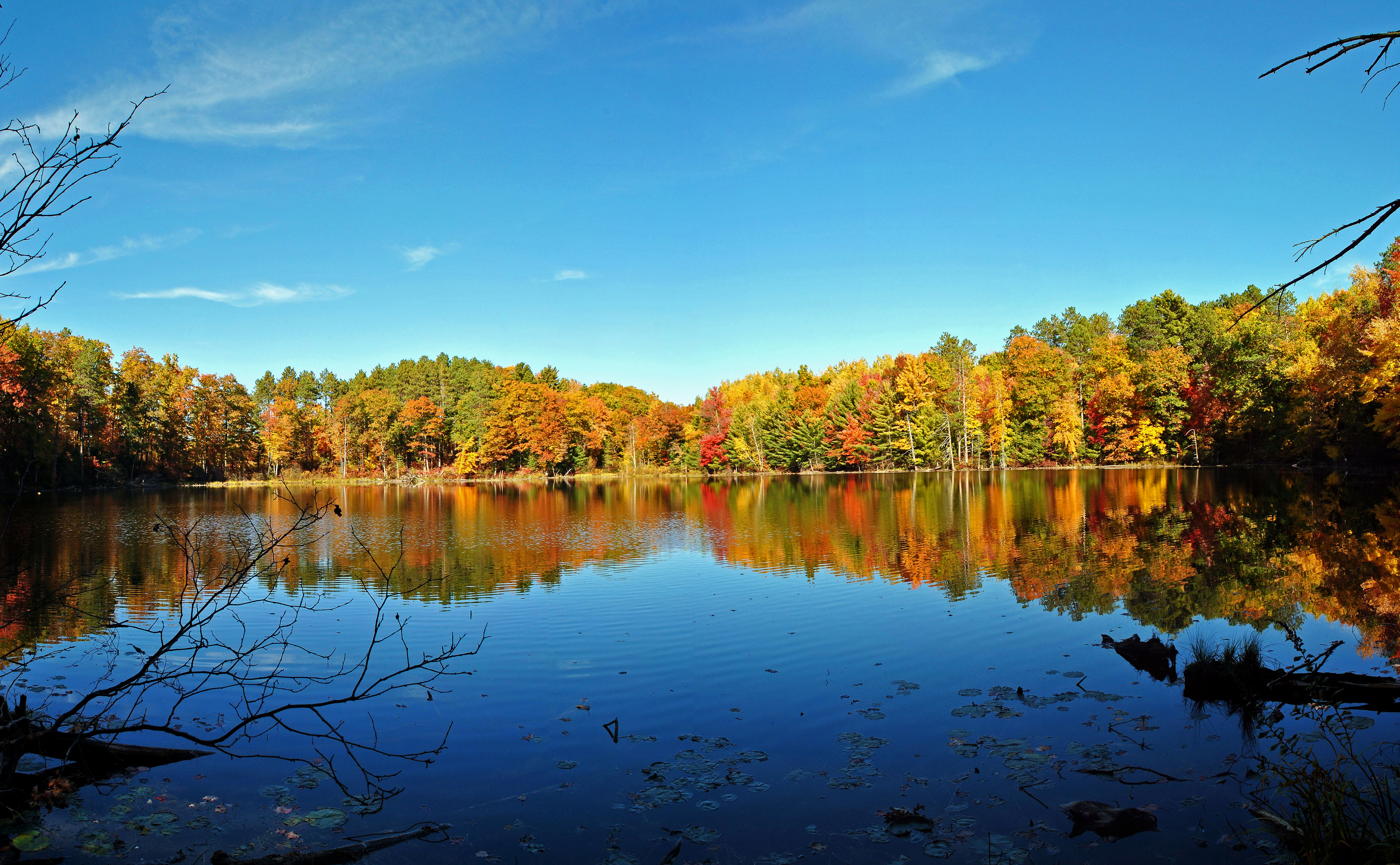

- Location within Wisconsin Location within the United States
- Location: Chippewa County, Wisconsin
- Coordinates: 45°13′28″N 91°18′6″W
- Area: 95 acres (38 ha)
- Elevation: 1,145 ft (349 m)
- Established: 2010
- Owner: Chippewa County
- Website: Official website
- Wisconsin State Natural Areas

Dorothy Lake State Natural Area is a Wisconsin Department of Natural Resources-designated State Natural Area featuring forested end moraine topography, with many steep-sided ridges and depressions. This results in a diverse mosaic of natural communities, including forests, swamps, fens, lakes, and streams.

== Location and access ==
Dorothy Lake State Natural Area is located in northern Chippewa County approximately 9 miles (14 km) west of Holcombe. Access is via a forest trail off of Deer Fly Trail, approximately 2 miles (3.2 km) south of County Highway M.

== Description ==
The namesake of the natural area, Dorothy Lake, is a 5.2 acre soft-water seepage lake, and contains a large, diverse assemblage of invertebrates, as well as three rare plant species. Three smaller, unnamed lakes surround Dorothy Lake, one of which contains a high-quality floating poor fen border. The uplands surrounding the lakes and wetlands contain northern mesic and dry-mesic forests, of primarily white pine (Pinus strobus), red pine (Pinus resinosa), and red oak (Quercus rubra). Rare plant species that can be found on the site include Blunt-Lobe Grape Fern (Botrychium oneidense), Prickly Hornwort (Ceratophyllum echinatum), White Adder's Mouth (Malaxis monophyllos), Farwell's Water Milfoil (Myriophyllum farwellii), Bog Bluegrass (Poa paludigena), and Hidden-Fruited Bladderwort (Utricularia geminiscapa).

== Gallery ==
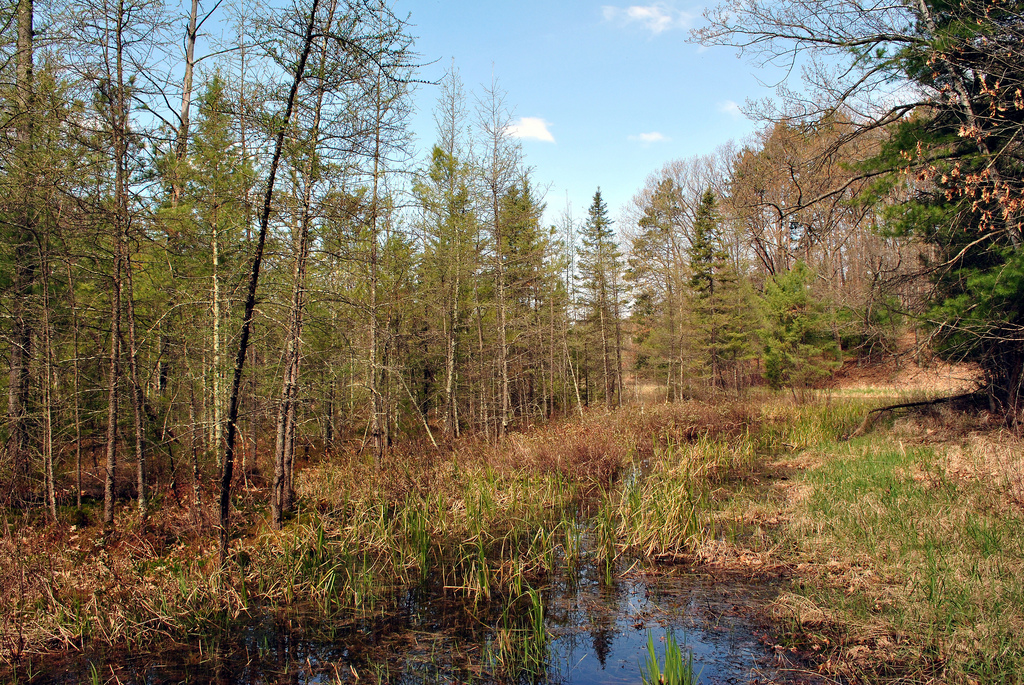
Boggy moat at one end of one of the unnamed lakes

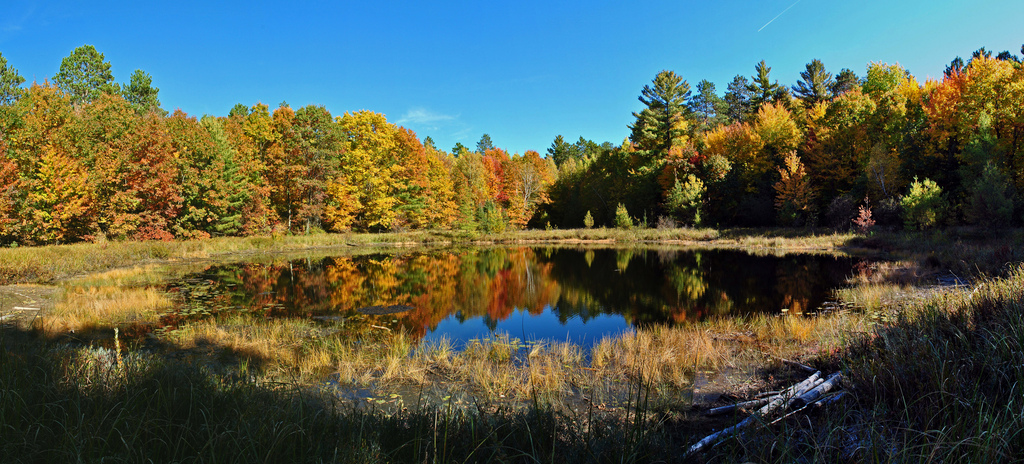
Unnamed lake south of Dorothy Lake

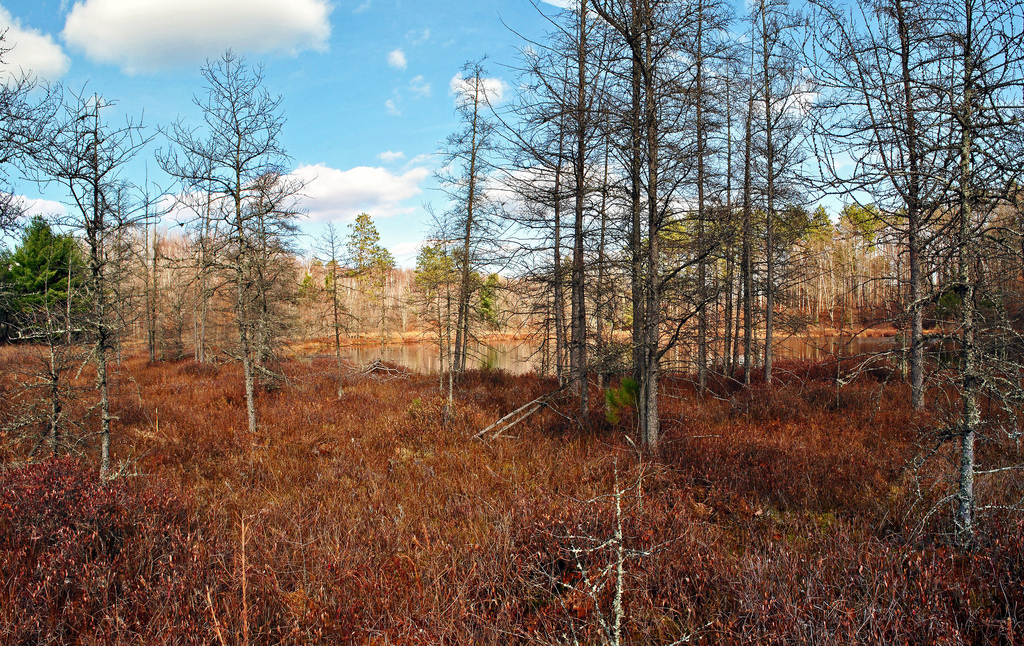
Unnamed lake north of Dorothy Lake
