= Faville Prairie =

Protected natural area

Faville Prairie State Natural Area
- Interactive map of Faville Prairie State Natural Area
- Location: Jefferson County, Wisconsin
- Nearest city: Lake Mills
- Area: 92 acres (37 ha)
- Established: 1952
- Governing body: University of Wisconsin-Madison

Faville Prairie is a prairie and protected state natural area in the town of Milford, in Jefferson County, Wisconsin. It is owned by the University of Wisconsin-Madison, and is managed by the University of Wisconsin-Madison Arboretum.

== History ==
Interest in the ecological importance of Faville Prairie began no later than the 1930s, with famed conservationist and UW-Madison professor Aldo Leopold arguing for its protection in 1938. The prairie was donated to UW-Madison in 1945, and was designated a state natural area by the Wisconsin Department of Natural Resources in 1952, becoming only the third site added to the program. An additional 35 acres were purchased and added to the preserve in 1976.

== Ecology ==
Situated on the western bank of the Crawfish River, Faville Prairie is one of few remnants of the once-large Crawfish Prairie. Grass species include big bluestem, as well as Indian grass and bluejoint. Other plant species present include sedges and forbs, such as compass plant, sunflowers, mountain mint, and northern bedstraw. A 2008 flood altered the composition of the plant community. Changes in hydrology over time have allowed woodier species to encroach into the prairie, enabled by drier conditions.

== Management and public access ==
Faville Prairie is currently closed to the public. Management includes the removal of invasive species such as buckthorn, willow, aspen, and sweet clover. Periodically, controlled fires are performed to reduce the risk of wildfire.
