= Durst Rockshelter State Natural Area =

Protected area in Wisconsin, US

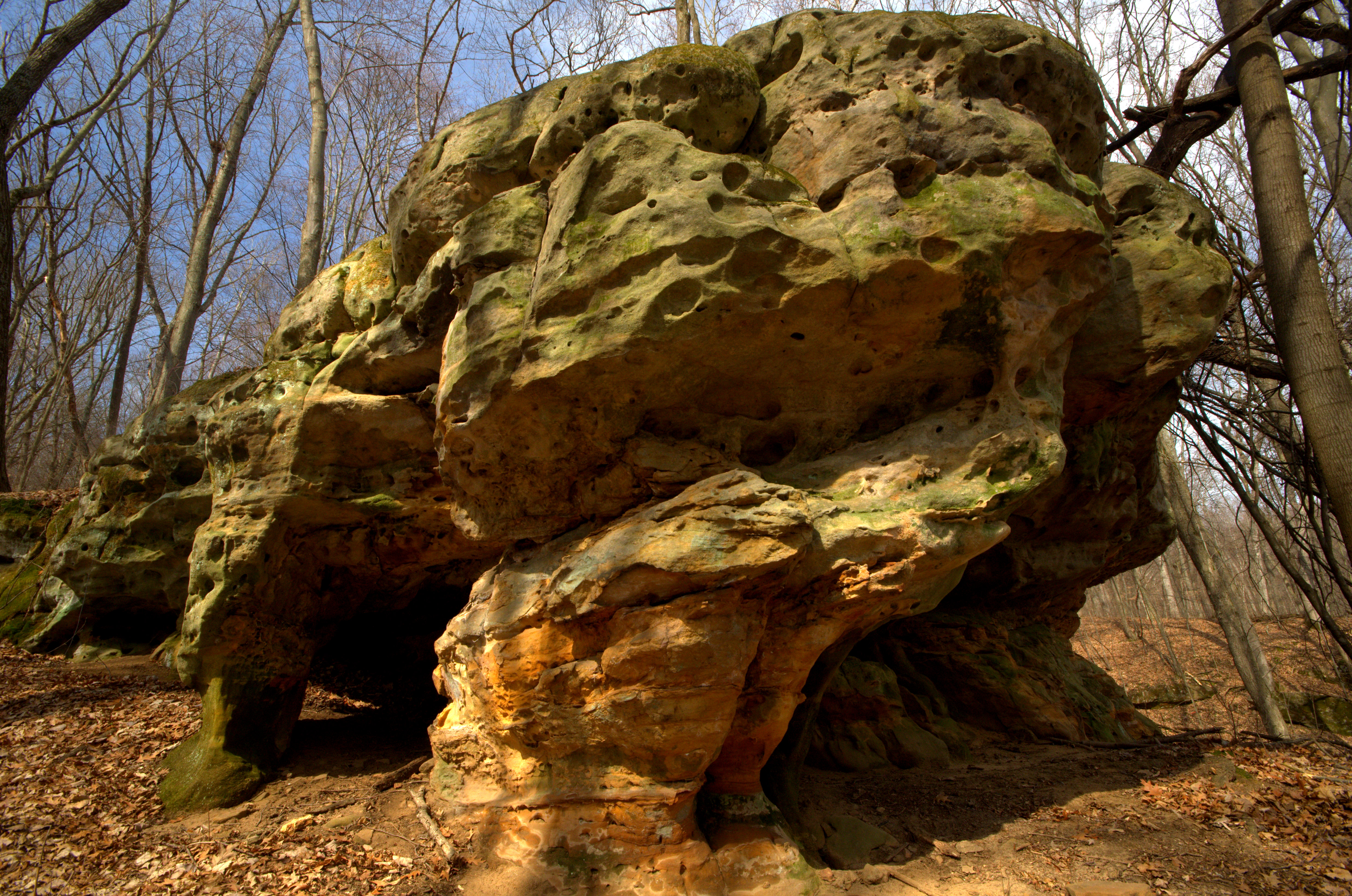

- Location within Wisconsin Location within the United States
- Location: Sauk County, Wisconsin
- Coordinates: 43°21′25″N 89°57′23″W
- Area: 40 acres (16 ha)
- Established: 1966
- Owner: The Nature Conservancy
- Website: Official website
- Wisconsin State Natural Areas
- Durst-Bloedau Site
- U.S. National Register of Historic Places
- Location within Wisconsin
- Nearest city: Leland, Wisconsin
- Area: 9.4 acres (3.8 ha)
- NRHP reference No.: 78000137
- Added to NRHP: December 19, 1978

Durst Rockshelter State Natural Area is a privately owned state natural area located roughly 1 mile (1.6 km) north of Leland, Wisconsin. The property encompasses a rock shelter inhabited by pre-Columbian Native Americans. Archaeological excavations at the rock shelter have uncovered projectile points and ceramic artifacts. The oldest artifacts date to the Archaic period from roughly 4000 to 3500 B.C., though the site was inhabited by multiple cultural groups across several periods of development. The rockshelter is surrounded by a mesic forest split by a sandstone ridge.

The property is listed on the National Register of Historic Places as the Durst-Bloedau Site. It is owned by The Nature Conservancy and public access is restricted without permission.
