= Wind Pudding Lake State Natural Area =

Lake and State Natural Area in Oneida County, Wisconsin

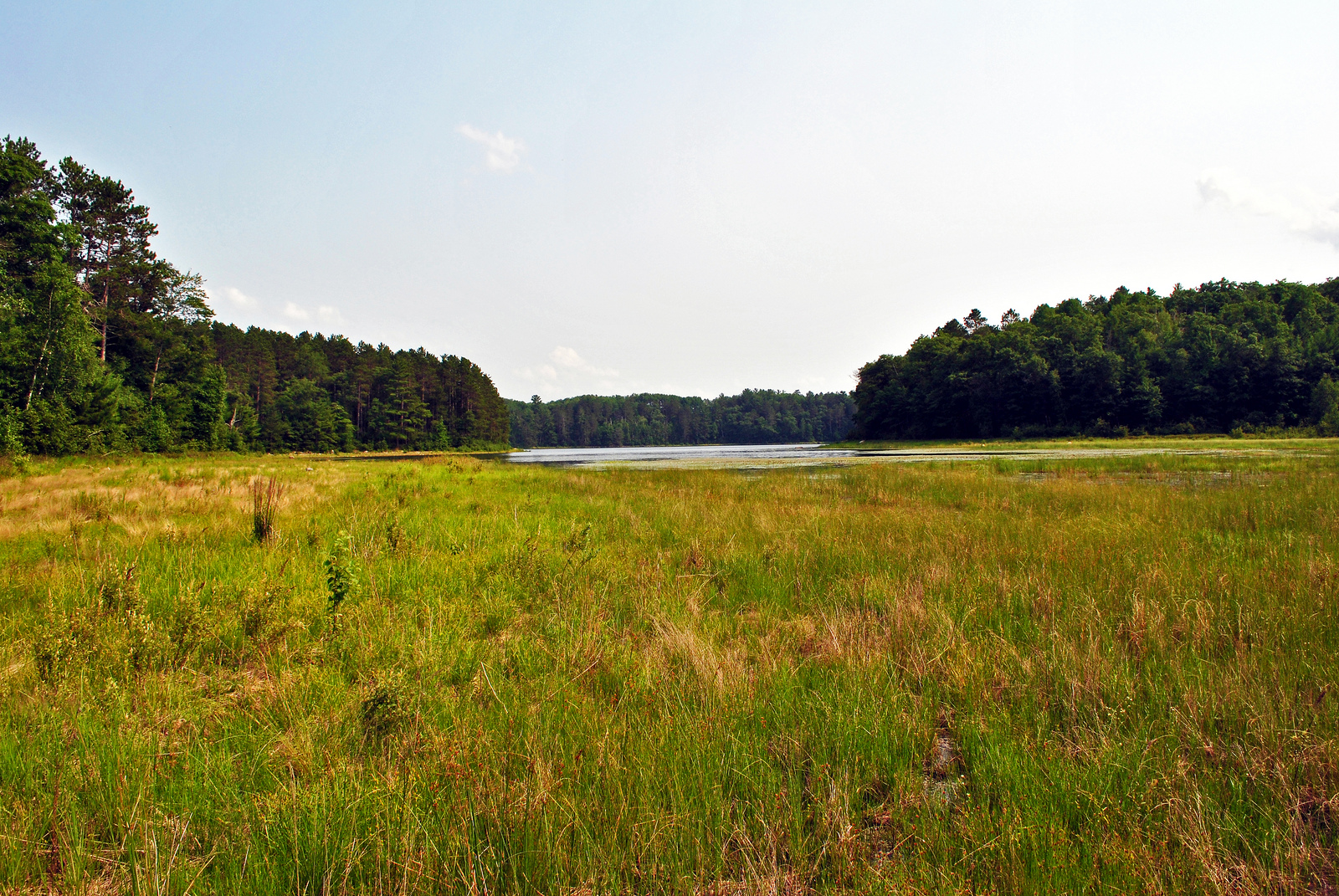
- Interactive map of Wind Pudding Lake State Natural Area
- Location: Oneida County, Wisconsin
- Coordinates: 45°45′46″N 89°38′17″W
- Area: 340 acres (140 ha)
- Elevation: 1,585 ft (483 m)
- Established: 1983
- Owner: Wisconsin Department of Natural Resources
- Website: Official website
Wind Pudding Lake State Natural Area

Wind Pudding Lake State Natural Area is a Wisconsin Department of Natural Resources-designated State Natural Area featuring the 180-acre Wind Pudding Lake, its associated wetlands, and some of its surrounding uplands. The lake is noteworthy for its separate basins, each having distinctive characteristics. The eastern basin is the deepest, at 35 feet (11 m), and has a primarily sand/gravel bottom. This basin contains a well-developed population of sterile-rosette aquatic vegetation, with several species considered either rare, or with a restricted range within the State of Wisconsin, such as the plantain shoreweed (Littorella uniflora). The central and western basins are much shallower and muck-bottomed, with extensive areas covered by a mat of floating peat, which supports a dense growth of aquatic vegetation, including sundew (Drosera intermedia), purple bladderwort (Utricularia purpurea), yellow-eyed grass (Xyris montana), and the rare Robbin's spike-rush (Eleocharis robbinsii). The western basin does have some development, with several houses, while the rest of the lake is undeveloped.

== Location and access ==
Wind Pudding Lake is located within the Northern Highland-American Legion State Forest, in north-central Oneida County, approximately 4 miles (6.4 km) southwest of Lake Tomahawk. To reach the lake via public lands, follow Bass Rd. south, off Bluebird Ln. After 0.2 miles (0.32 km), the road forks - the right fork leads to the central basin, while the left fork leads to the eastern basin.

== Gallery ==
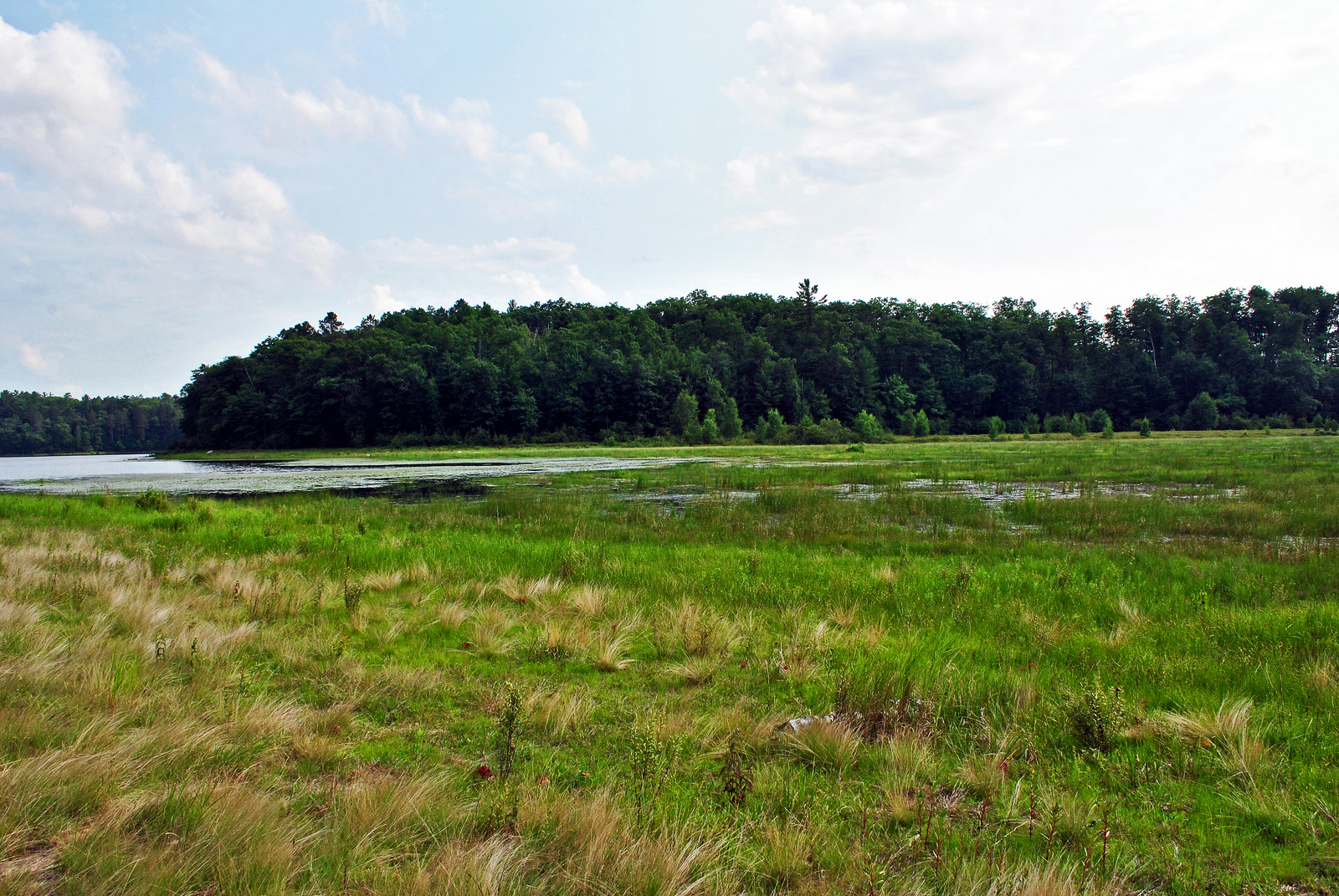
Transition between the deeper, open eastern basin and the peat mat-covered central basin

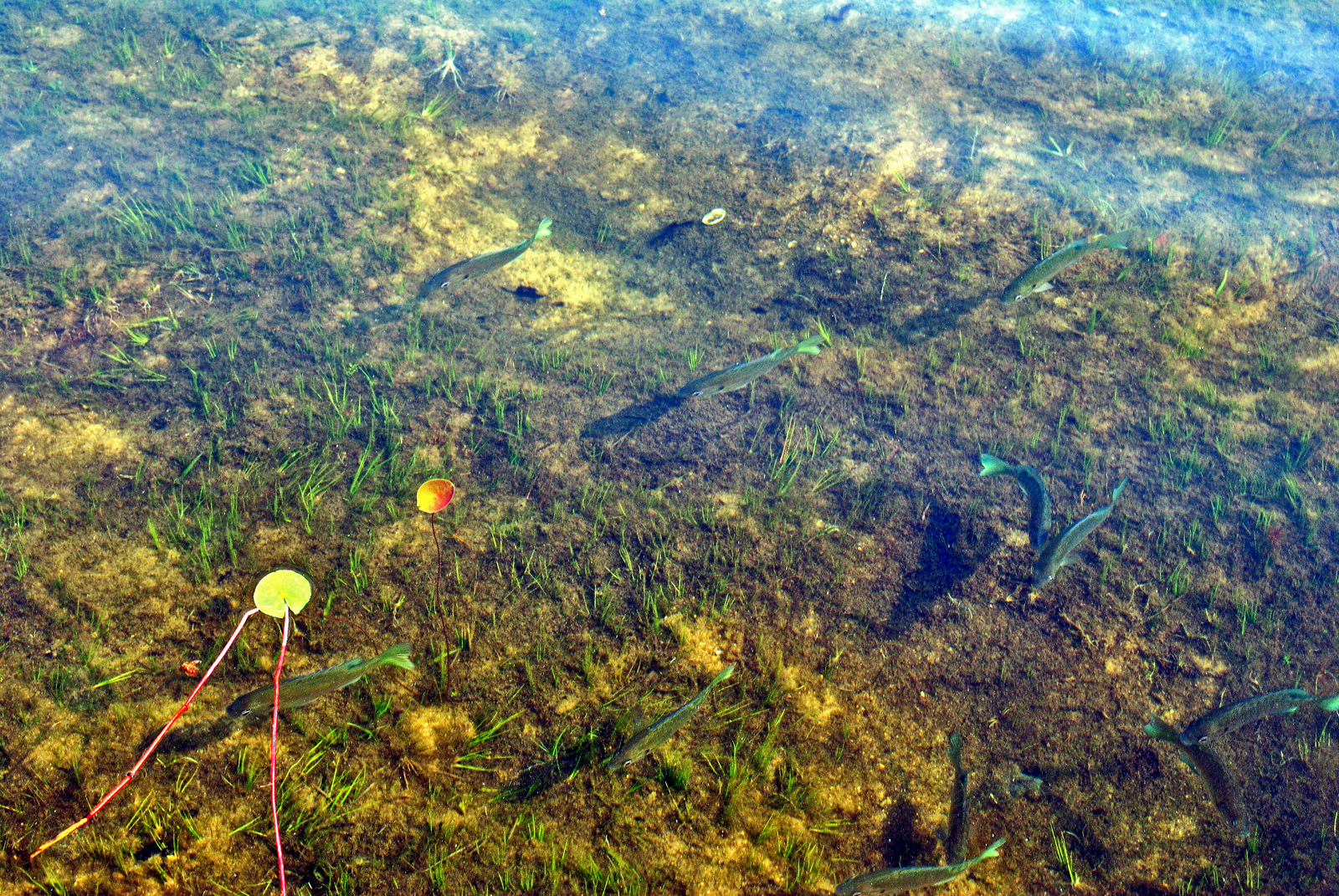
Clear water and sterile-rosette flora found in the eastern basin

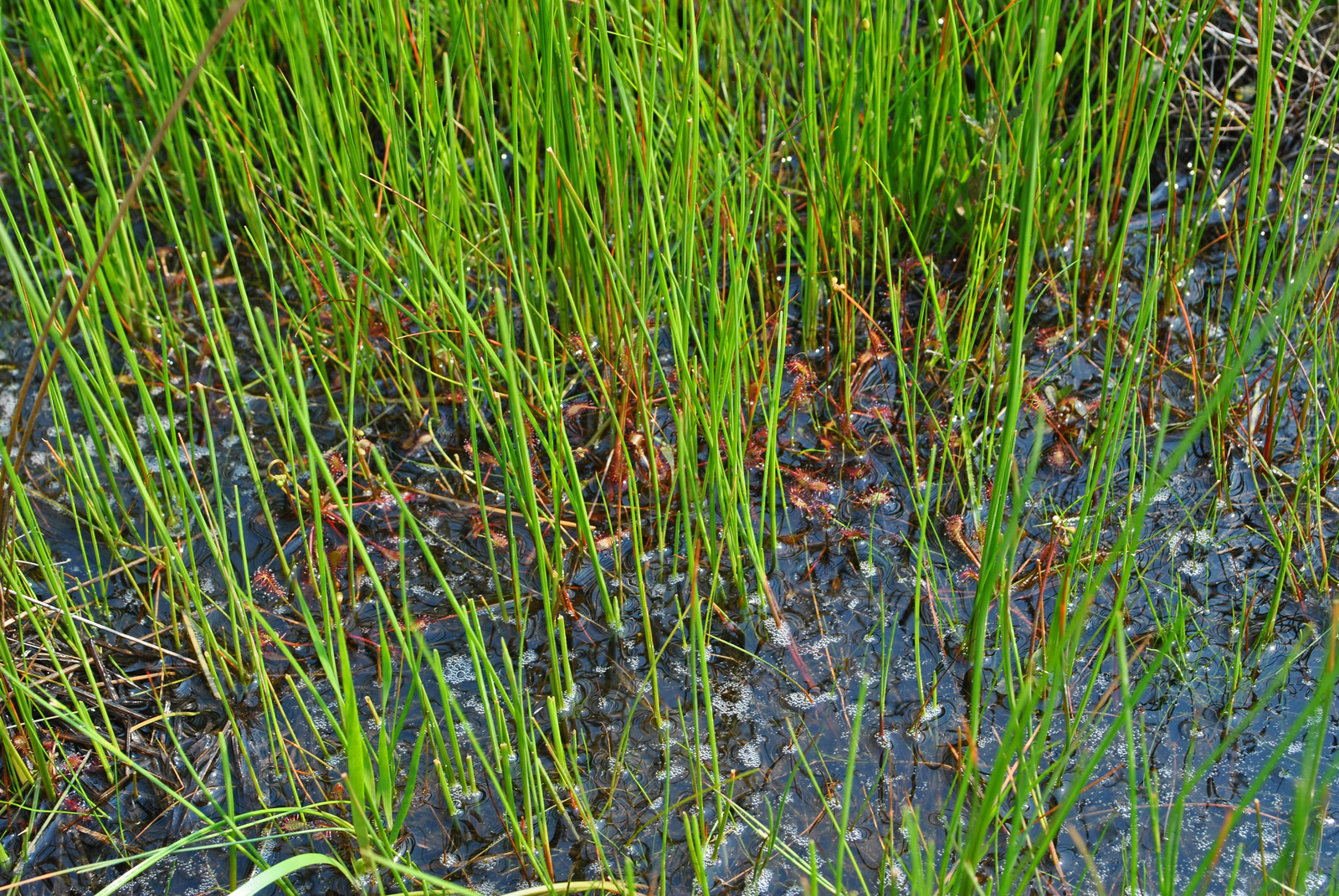
A close-up of the dense vegetation growing on the peat mat covering the central basin
