= Blomberg Lake and Woods State Natural Area =

State Natural Area in Burnett County, Wisconsin

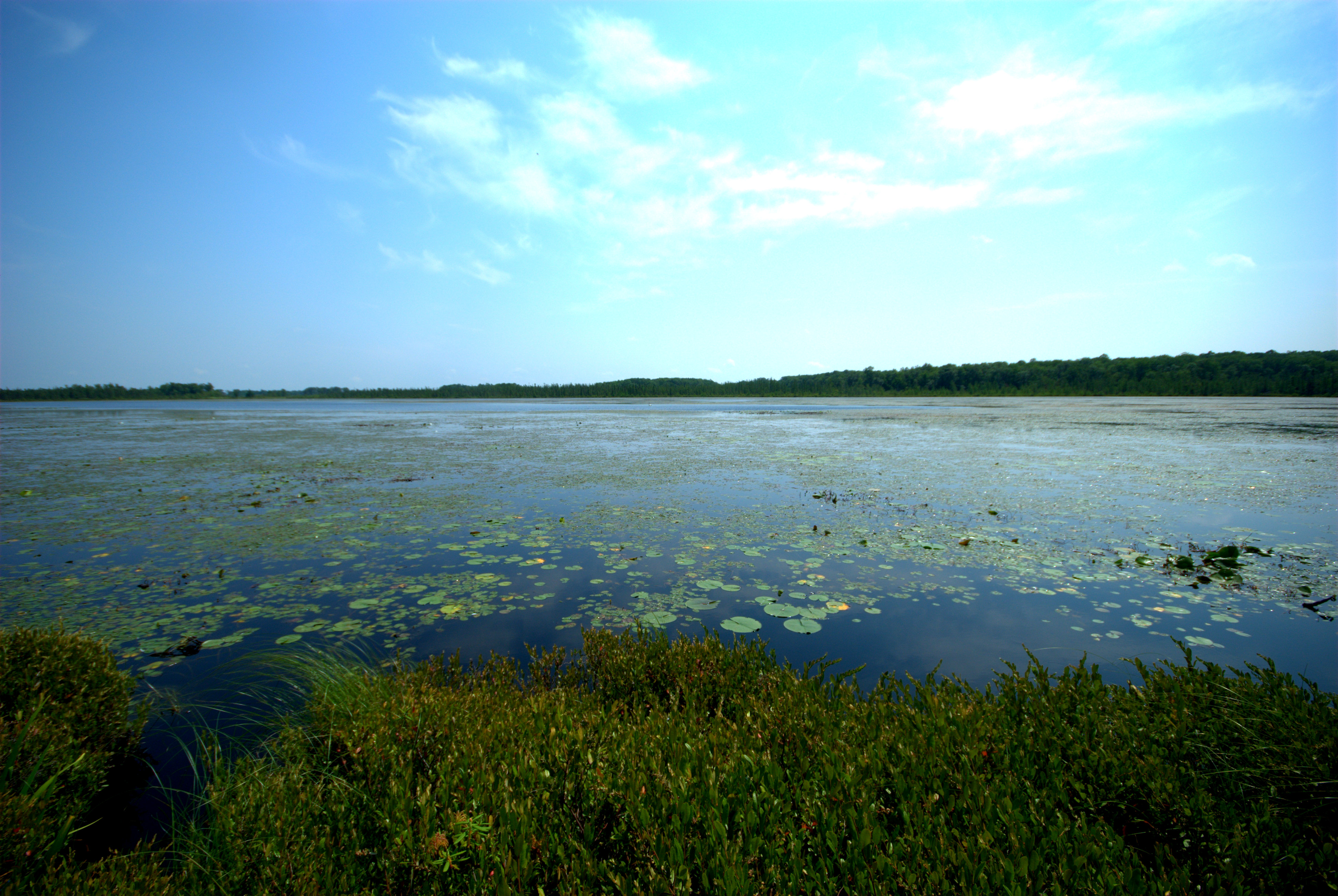

- Location within Wisconsin Location within the United States
- Location: Burnett County, Wisconsin
- Coordinates: 45°48′45″N 92°27′54″W
- Area: 966 acres (391 ha)
- Established: 2003
- Owner: Wisconsin Department of Natural Resources
- Website: Official website
- Wisconsin State Natural Areas

Blomberg Lake and Woods State Natural Area is a Wisconsin Department of Natural Resources-designated State Natural Area made up of 966 acres (391 ha) of land. The state natural area is named after the 68 acres (28 ha) bog lake in the center of the protected area. The area is rich in plant life such as; sphagnum moss, cranberry, tawny cottongrass (Eriophorum virginicum), pod-grass, three-way sedge and multiple trees such as aspen, speckled alder, black spruce, and red maple.

== Land cover ==
The state natural area is made up primarily of forested area, with 454 acres (184 ha) of the total 966 acres (391 ha) containing some type of tree. The remaining 512 acres (207 ha) are made up of Blomberg Lake and non-forested wetlands.

Cover type acreage
| Cover type | Acres | Percentage cover |
|---|---|---|
| Aspen | 49 | 5% |
| Non-forested wetland | 436 | 45% |
| Oak | 200 | 21% |
| Swamp conifer | 146 | 15% |
| Swamp hardwood | 21 | 2% |
| Upland hardwood | 38 | 4% |
| Water | 76 | 8% |
| Total Acreage | 966 | 100% |

== See also ==
- Amsterdam Sloughs Wildlife Area
