= Abraham's Woods =

Forest in Wisconsin, United States

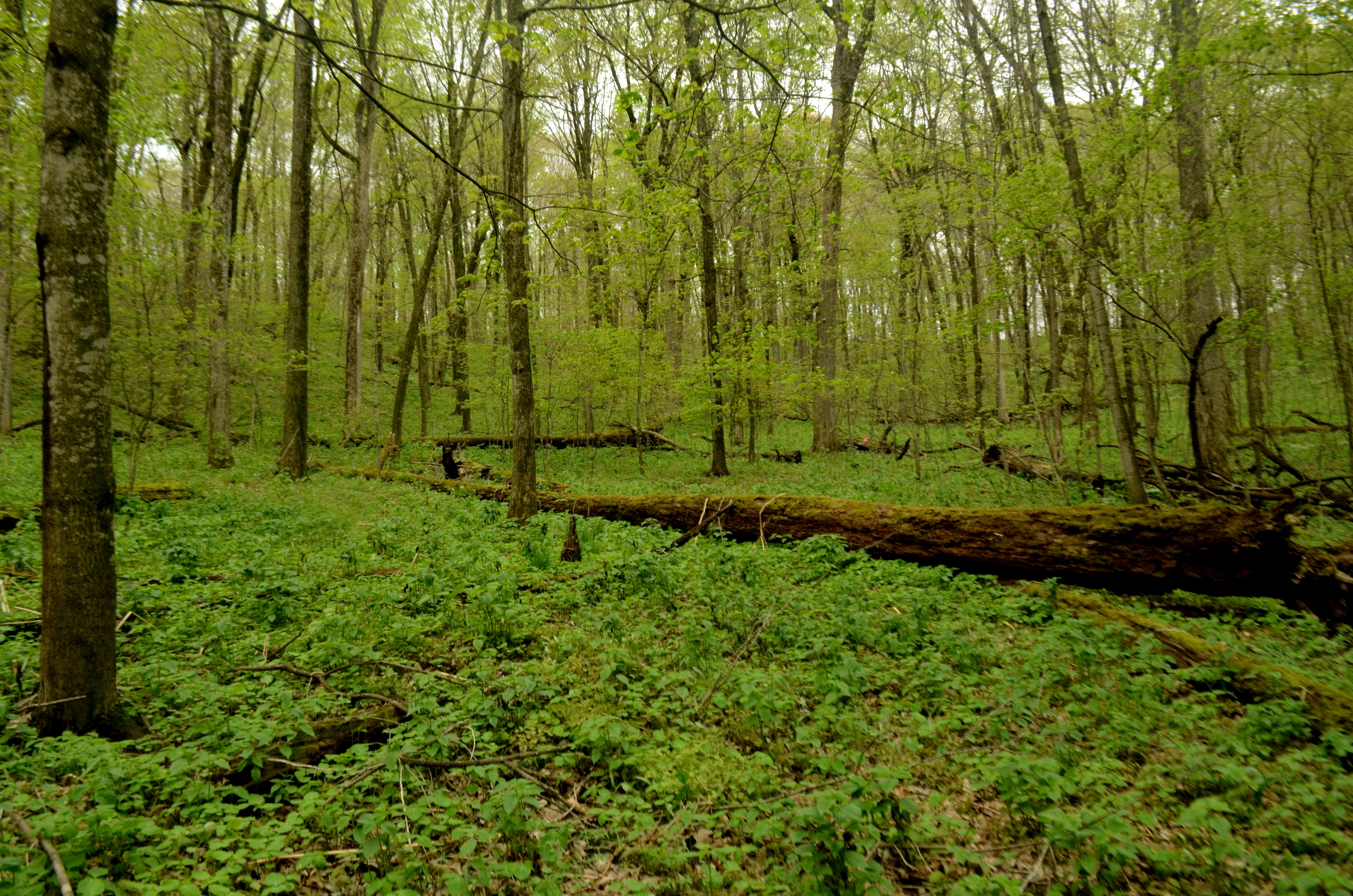
- Abraham's Woods in April 2012

- Location within Wisconsin Location within the United States
- Location: Green County, Wisconsin
- Coordinates: 42°40′58″N 89°29′02″W
- Area: 40 acres (16 ha)
- Governing body: University of Wisconsin-Madison

U.S. National Natural Landmark
- Designated: 1973

Abraham's Woods is a 40-acre (16 ha) forest in Green County, Wisconsin owned by the University of Wisconsin-Madison. It was designated a Wisconsin State Natural Area in 1961 and a National Natural Landmark in 1973.

== Description ==
Abraham's Woods features an old-growth stand of southern mesic forest, which is increasingly rare in Wisconsin. Trees found in the woods include the sugar maple, basswood, red oak, bitternut hickory, hackberry, butternut tree, slippery elm and white oak. A sandstone ridge surrounds the woods, creating a natural amphitheatre facing the east. Other plants that can be found in Abraham's Woods include the dogtooth violet, the wood nettle, the yellow jewelweed, the false rue anemone and the Dutchman's breeches. Additionally, it is home to an active great blue heron rookery.
