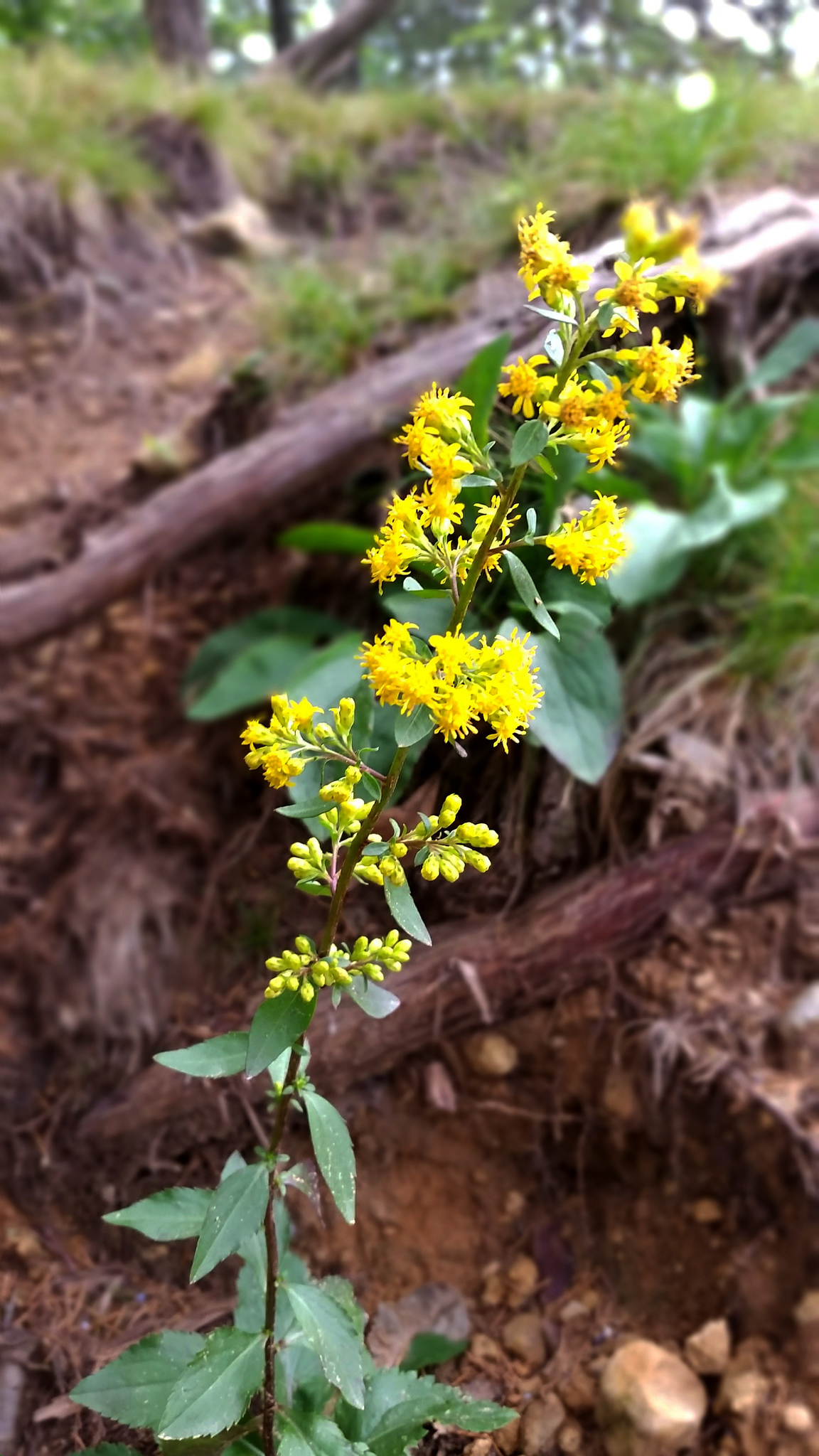
- In Gibraltar Rock State Natural Area, Wisconsin

Scientific classification
- Kingdom: Plantae
- Clade: Tracheophytes
- Clade: Angiosperms
- Clade: Eudicots
- Clade: Asterids
- Order: Asterales
- Family: Asteraceae
- Genus: Solidago
- Species: S. sciaphila

Binomial name
- Solidago sciaphila E.S.Steele

= Solidago sciaphila =

Species of flowering plant

Solidago sciaphilia is known as shadowy goldenrod or cliff goldenrod. The species is endemic to bluffs along the Mississippi River in southern Minnesota, and the driftless area of southwestern Wisconsin, northern Iowa and Illinois. Throughout its range, S. sciaphila is strongly associated with dolomite and sandstone bedrock, especially dry cliffs. It can be similar to Solidago speciosa but has more serrate lower and mid stem leaves and is generally smaller to much smaller when growing in pockets of shallow soil on cliffs. Small plants are similar to Solidago hispida in general appearance. Blooming occurs late August through late September; fruiting occurs throughout September. Shadowy Goldenrod is considered a Special Concern species in Wisconsin and Minnesota, and considered threatened in Illinois. This species can be significantly impacted by rock climbing activities.

The type collection was made by E. S. Steele in 1909, Vicinity of Kilbourn, on the Wisconsin River. Reports of Solidago sciaphila from North Carolina are Solidago villosicarpa instead (LeBlond, 2000).
