= Hay Meadow Creek =

Stream in Wisconsin, United States

Coordinates: 44°33′18″N 89°36′09″W

Hay Meadow Creek is a stream in the U.S. state of Wisconsin.

Hay Meadow Creek was previously known as "Willow Creek"; the present name was adopted in the 1840s as "Sheritts Hay Meadow Creek".
