= Avon Bottoms Wildlife Area =

Protected area in Wisconsin, US

- IUCN category V (protected landscape/seascape)
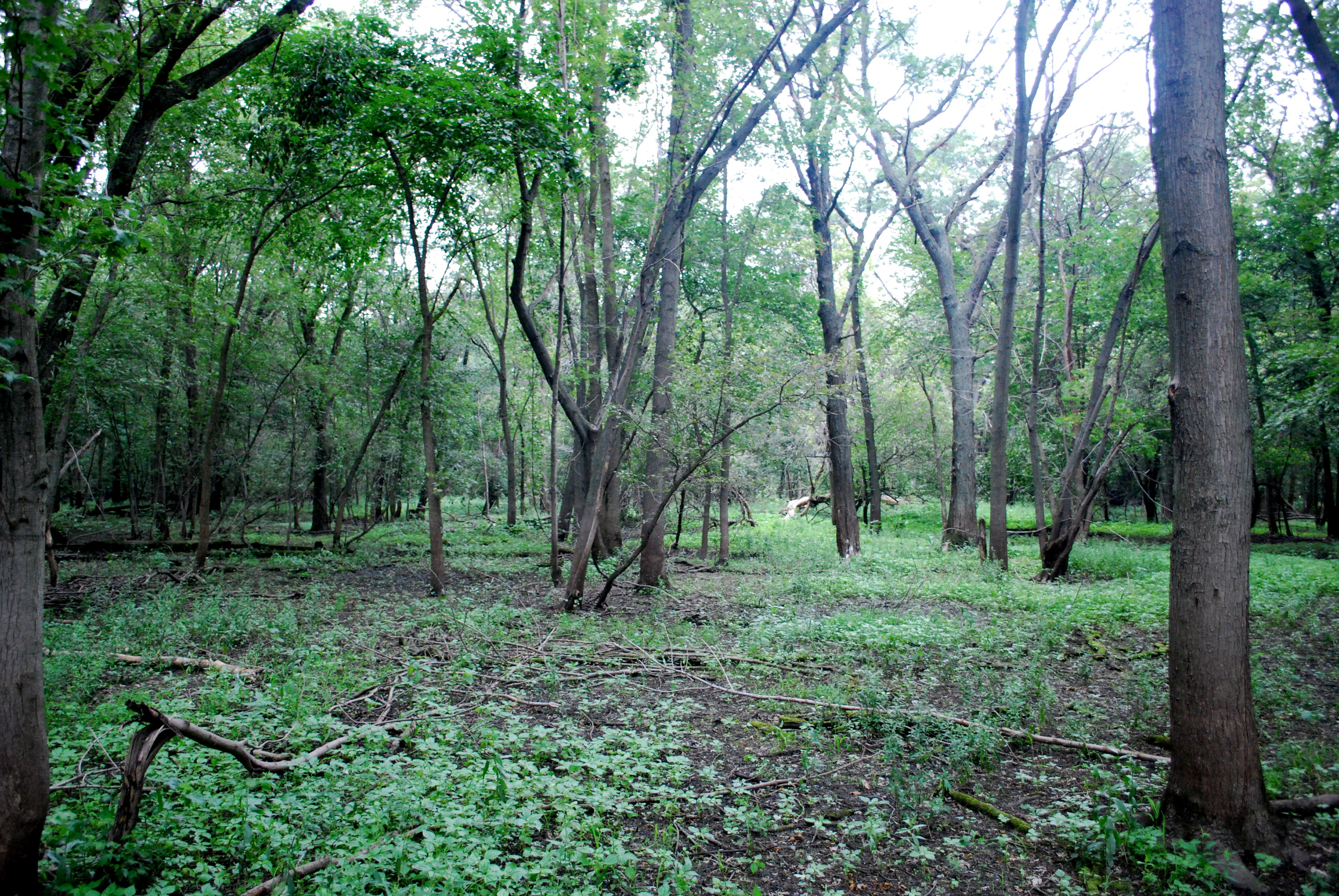
- Avon Bottoms State Natural Area

- Location within Wisconsin Location within the United States
- Location: Rock County, Wisconsin
- Nearest city: Brodhead, Wisconsin
- Coordinates: 42.551109°N 89.358304°W
- Area: 3,402 acres (13.77 km^{2})
- Established: 1960
- Governing body: Wisconsin Department of Natural Resources

The Avon Bottoms Wildlife Area is a tract of protected land located on the border of Illinois in Rock County, Wisconsin, managed by the Wisconsin Department of Natural Resources (WDNR).

== History ==
The Avon Bottoms Wildlife area was established in 1960 as part of a federal wildlife restoration project, specifically to improve duck and pheasant populations in the area to attract hunters.

The area was established to improve and preserve wildlife and habitat diversity along the Sugar River, a popular destination for kayakers, canoers, and tubers. The area's preservation has led to the Wisconsin Wetlands Association to declare the floodplain forest a "wetland gem".

The Natural Resources Conservation Service, an agency of the United States Department of Agriculture restored wetlands and grasslands in the area, with 3,100 such acres working as easements directly adjacent to the wildlife area.

== Land cover ==
The main feature of the wildlife area is the bottomland hardwood forest, making up over one third of the total area. There are also many notable examples of large swamp white oak trees in the floodplain areas, mainly in the Avon Bottoms natural area sector. The 1986 WDNR master plan for the Wildlife Area states that some of these trees are near record size, and important to the biodiversity and the environment.

Cover type acreage
Cover type	Acres	Percentage cover
Agriculture	200	6%
Bottomland hardwood	1,440	42%
Developed	10	<1%
Grassland	410	12%
Lowland shrub	200	6%
Non-forested wetlands	380	11%
Oak	70	2%
Prairie	340	10%
Upland conifer	85	2%
Upland hardwood	30	1%
Water	237	7%
Total acreage	3,402	100%

== State natural areas ==
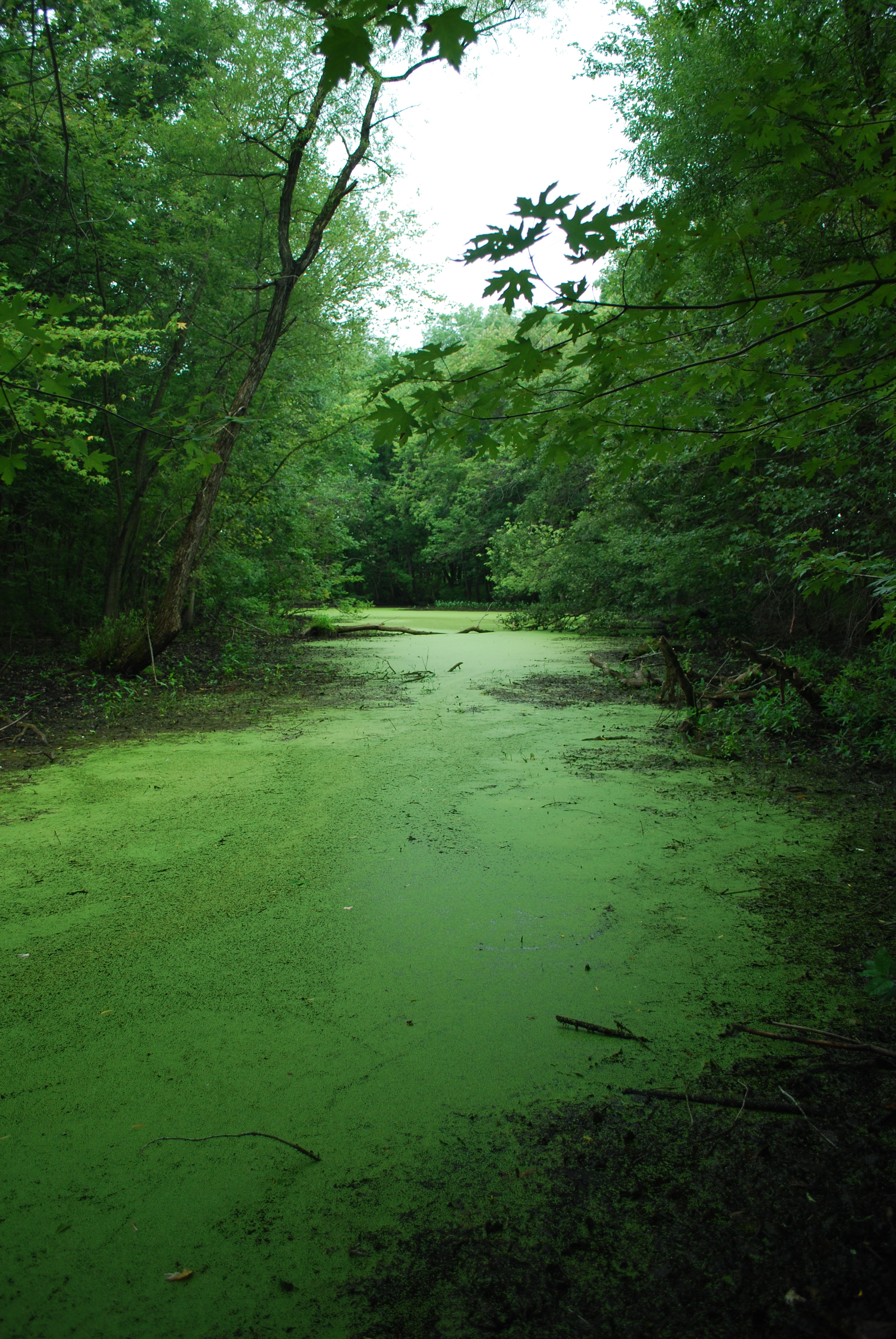
Swenson Wet Prairie

The Avon Bottoms State Natural Area is a unit of the larger wildlife area, and comprises 1,649 acres (667 ha) of mostly floodplain forest.

In 2016, the State Natural Area Swenson Wet Prairie, designated in 1968, coalesced into the existing Avon Bottoms State Natural Area.
