= Dunns Lake =

Lake of the United States of America

- Location within Minnesota
- Location: Meeker County, Minnesota
- Coordinates: 45°9′21″N 94°25′44″W
- Type: lake

Dunns Lake is a lake in Meeker County, in the U.S. state of Minnesota.

Dunns Lake was named for Timothy Dunn, a pioneer who settled there.
