= Downtown Baraboo Historic District =

- U.S. National Register of Historic Places
- U.S. Historic district
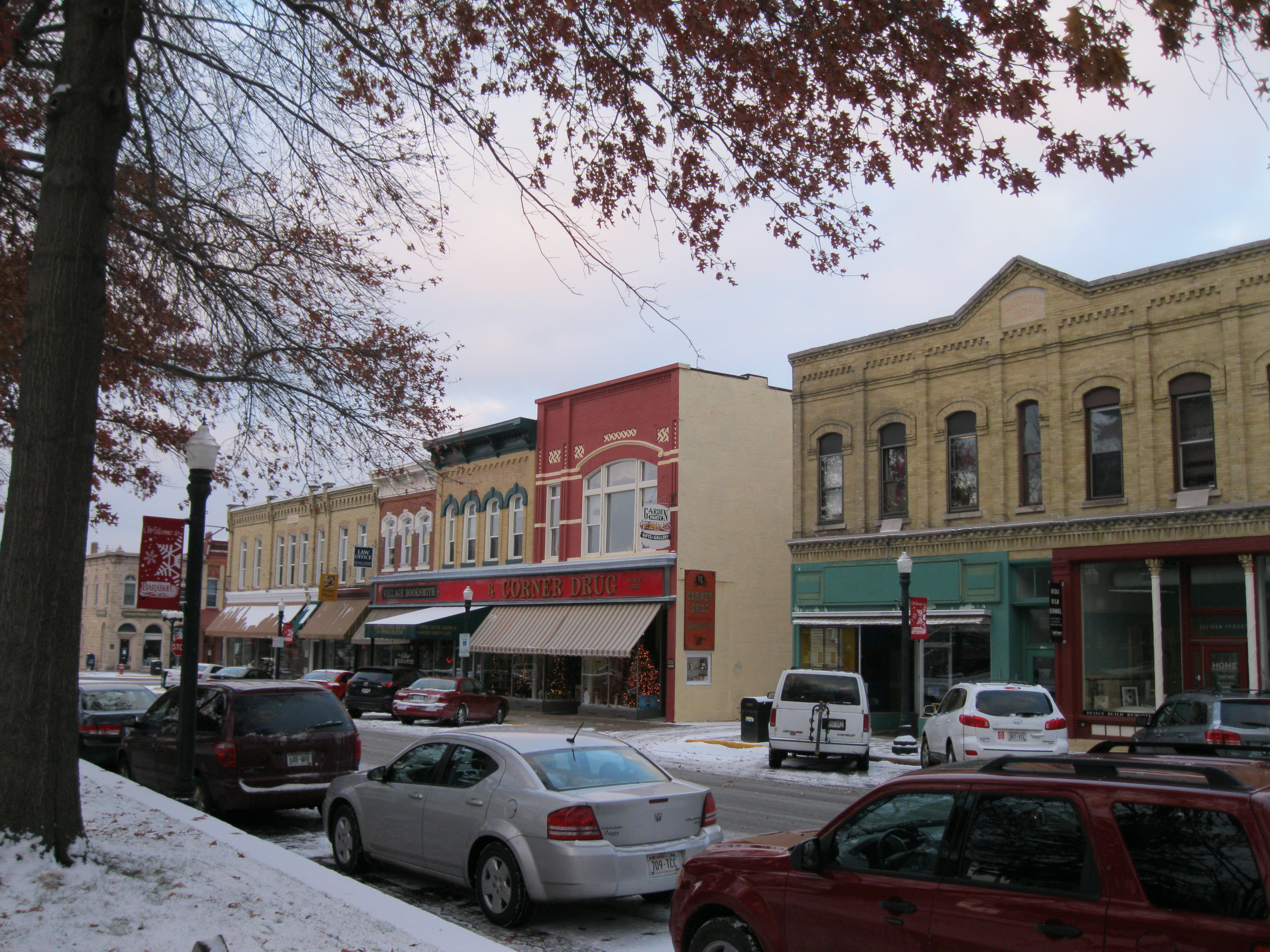

- Location within Wisconsin
- Location: Roughly bounded by 5th & 2nd Aves., 5th, Ash, 1st, Oak & Birch Sts., Baraboo, Wisconsin
- Coordinates: 43°28′13″N 89°44′39″W
- Area: 22 acres (8.9 ha)
- NRHP reference No.: 15000340
- Added to NRHP: June 8, 2015

The Downtown Baraboo Historic District is a national historic district in downtown Baraboo, Wisconsin. The district encompasses 78 contributing buildings, most of which are commercial buildings centered around the Sauk County Courthouse square. Development in the district began in the 1840s; at the time, the courthouse district was considered the wealthy part of Baraboo by comparison to the more industrial areas by the Baraboo River and the railroad. The oldest contributing buildings in the district date to the 1870s, when economic growth in Baraboo and a series of fires that destroyed older buildings spurred extensive construction in the courthouse district. New buildings continued to be built in the district through the mid-twentieth century, with the latest contributing building being the 1966 Baraboo City Hall. The district includes examples of most popular architectural styles of the late nineteenth and early twentieth centuries, including Italianate, Romanesque Revival, Neoclassical, Colonial Revival and other revival styles, Beaux-Arts, Prairie School, Modernist, and vernacular commercial styles.

The district was added to the National Register of Historic Places on June 8, 2015. Three buildings in the district are listed individually on the National Register: the Sauk County Courthouse, the Al. Ringling Theatre, and the Gust Brothers' Store.
