= Thompson House Hotel =

- U.S. National Register of Historic Places
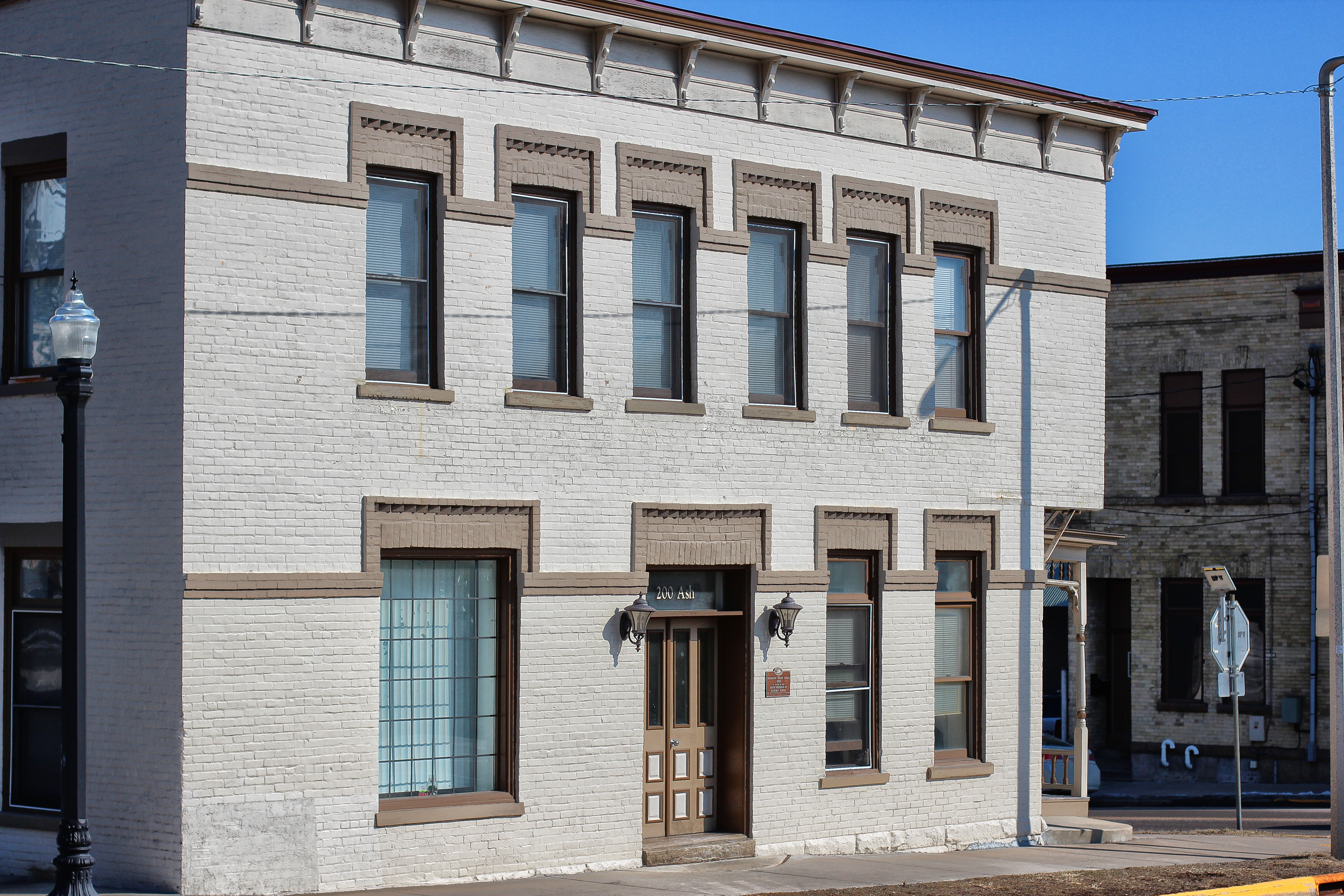

- Location within Wisconsin
- Location: 200 Ash St., Baraboo, Wisconsin
- Coordinates: 43°28′02″N 89°44′24″W
- Area: less than one acre
- Built: 1899
- Built by: Dan Worth, John Thompson
- Architectural style: Italianate
- NRHP reference No.: 97001583
- Added to NRHP: December 22, 1997

The Thompson House Hotel is a historic hotel building at 200 Ash Street in Baraboo, Wisconsin. John Thompson built the hotel in 1899 to replace an older hotel on the site, which he had owned since the early 1890s. The two-story Italianate building features door and window heads and banding in dark-colored brick as well as a bracketed cornice. The first floor housed a dining room, which was later converted to a saloon, along with the innkeeper's quarters and storage rooms; the second floor had twenty guest rooms. The hotel was part of a group of hotels near the Baraboo railroad station and Ringling Brothers Circus headquarters; these hotels served tourists, circus workers, and traveling salesmen. Thompson sold the hotel before 1915, but it operated as a hotel under several names until the 1960s; it has since been converted to apartments.

The building was added to the National Register of Historic Places on December 22, 1997.
