= Albrecht C. Ringling House =

- U.S. National Register of Historic Places
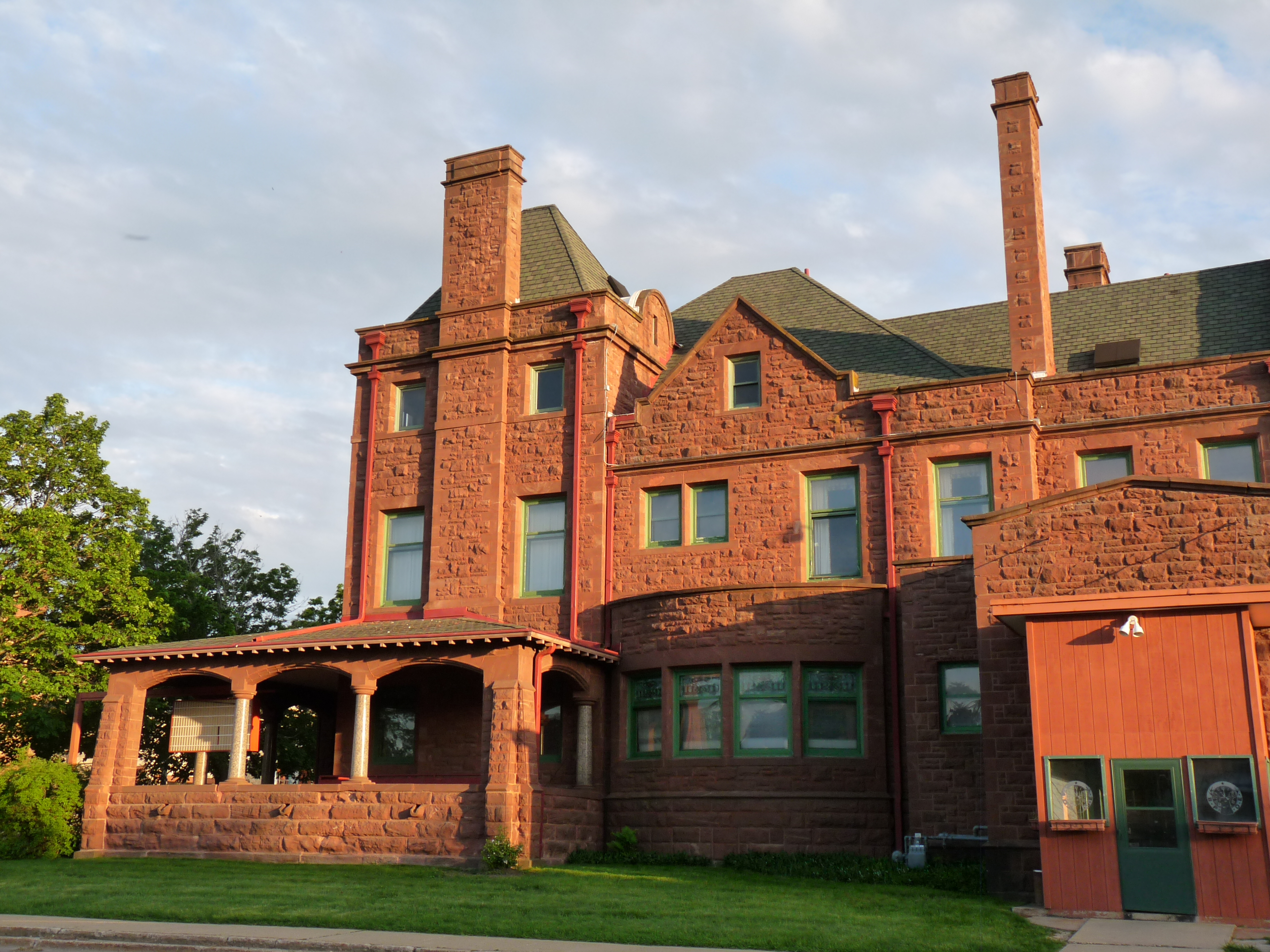

- Location within Wisconsin
- Location: 623 Broadway, Baraboo, Wisconsin
- Coordinates: 43°28′25″N 89°44′41″W
- Area: less than one acre
- Built: 1906
- Architectural style: Richardsonian Romanesque
- NRHP reference No.: 76000079
- Added to NRHP: May 17, 1976

The Albrecht C. Ringling House is a historic house at 623 Broadway in Baraboo, Wisconsin. The house was built in 1906 for Albrecht C. Ringling, the eldest of the Ringling brothers, and his wife Louise. By the time of the house's construction, the Ringling Brothers Circus was among the largest in the country, and it would acquire the Barnum and Bailey Circus the following year. The two-and-a-half story mansion has a Richardsonian Romanesque design and was built using brownstone quarried at Port Wing, Wisconsin. The house's design features a wraparound front porch topped by a square tower at the northeast corner, a porte-cochere on one side, and a hip roof interrupted by multiple gables. The interior decoration includes oak and mahogany woodwork, a marble fireplace, and a large painted landscape. Baraboo's Elks lodge bought the house from Ringling's family in 1936 and used it as a clubhouse for several decades; it is currently a historic house museum and brewery.

The house was added to the National Register of Historic Places on May 17, 1976.
