= Walworth D. Porter Duplex Residence =

- U.S. National Register of Historic Places
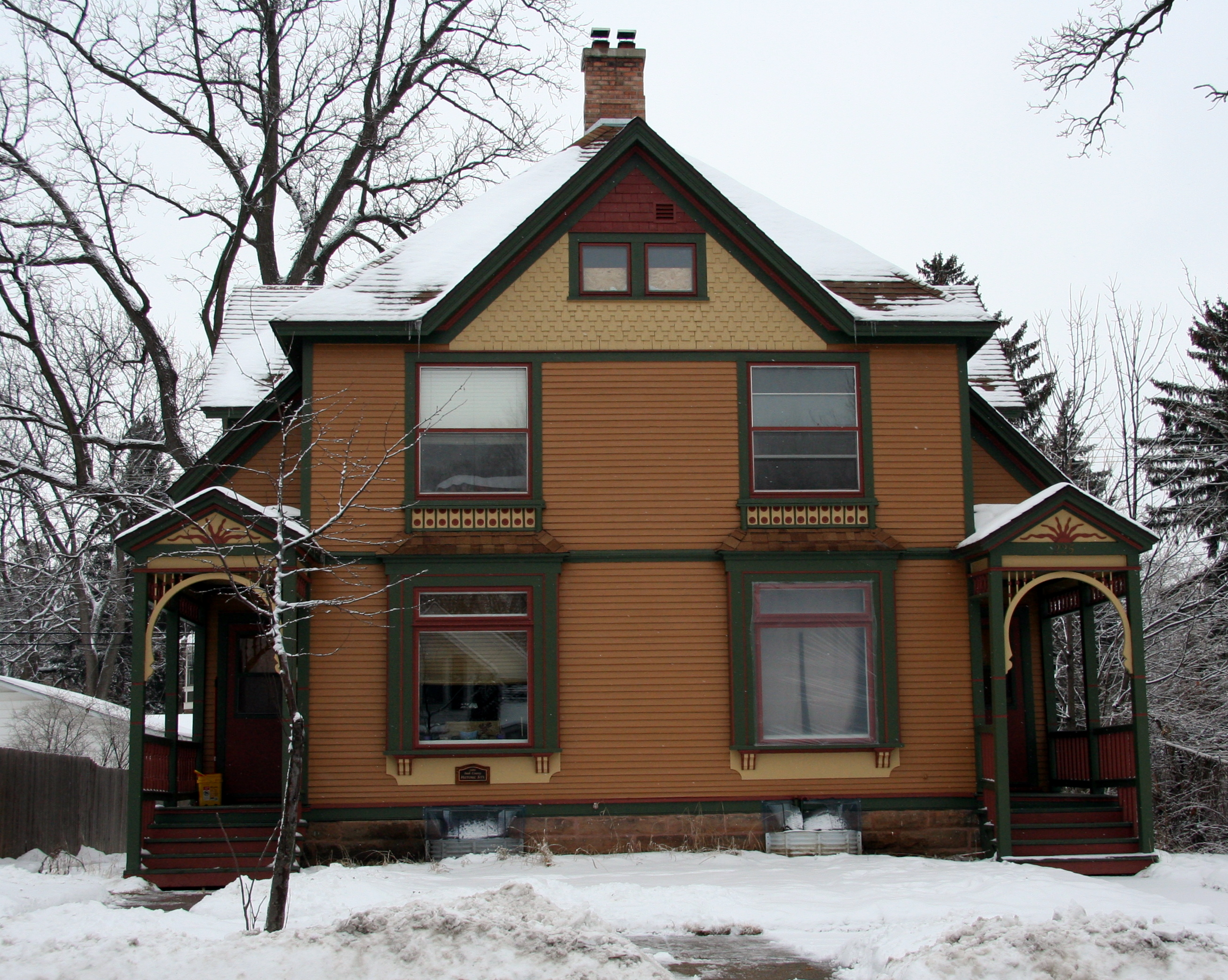
- Walworth D. Porter Duplex Residence
- Location: 221-225 7th St. Baraboo, Wisconsin
- Coordinates: 43.47398°N 89.73951°W
- Area: less than one acre
- Built: 1894
- Built by: Vanderveer, J. Nels
- Architectural style: Queen Anne
- NRHP reference No.: 96001053
- Added to NRHP: September 27, 1996

The Walworth D. Porter Duplex Residence is located in Baraboo, Wisconsin. It was added to the National Register of Historic Places in 1996.

Developer Walworth D. Porter built the duplex in 1894 as a rental property. The building has a Queen Anne style design with an irregular layout featuring reflection symmetry, clapboard and wood shingle siding, an oriel window and arched entrance porch with decorative woodwork on each unit, and a large dormer atop the front facade. The interior is generally intact and includes ornamental woodwork and fireplaces with decorative tiling in each unit. Duplex housing in Baraboo typically housed middle-class workers, especially those employed by the growing Ringling Brothers Circus; Charles Ringling, one of the Ringling Brothers, was the first tenant in the east unit. The building is a rare surviving example of side-by-side duplex housing in Baraboo.
