= Charles Ringling House =

- U.S. National Register of Historic Places
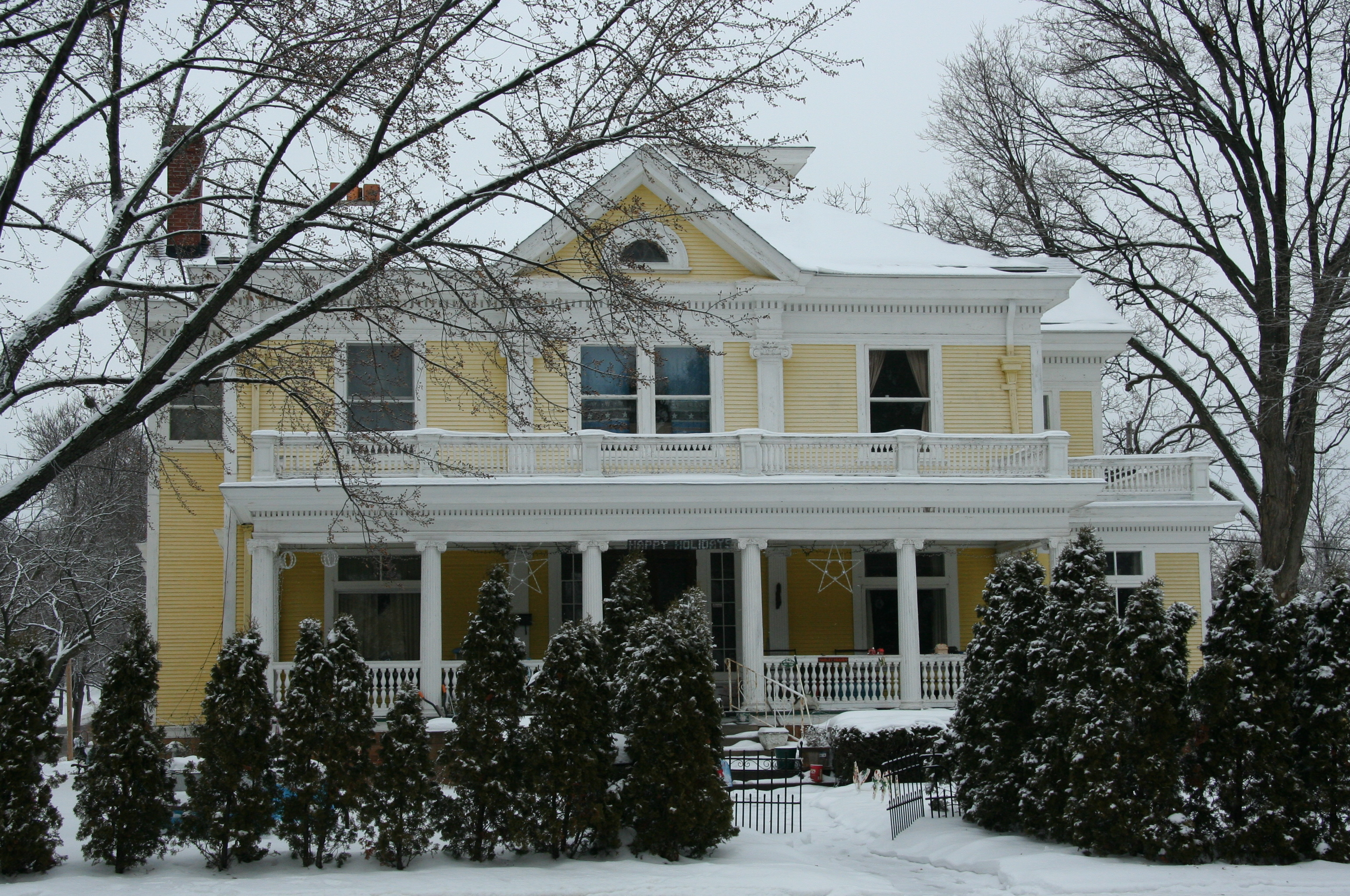

- Location within Wisconsin
- Location: 201 8th St., Baraboo, Wisconsin
- Coordinates: 43°28′30″N 89°44′24″W
- Area: 2 acres (0.81 ha)
- Built: 1900
- Built by: Isenberg Brothers
- Architectural style: Georgian Revival
- NRHP reference No.: 97000268
- Added to NRHP: March 21, 1997

The Charles Ringling House is a historic house at 201 8th Street in Baraboo, Wisconsin. Charles Ringling, one of the five brothers who founded the Ringling Brothers Circus, had the house built in 1900 for his family. Brothers George and Karl Isenberg of Baraboo built the Georgian Revival house. The two-story house features a long front porch supported by Ionic columns, a balustrade along the porch roof, two-story pilasters dividing the house's three bays, and a pediment atop the central bay. The property also includes a carriage house, a cottage, and a barn. Ringling and his wife Edith lived in the house until 1912, when they moved to Evanston, Illinois.

The house was added to the National Register of Historic Places on March 21, 1997.
