= Beryl Newman =

American military lieutenant

Beryl R. Newman
- Born: November 2, 1911; Baraboo, Wisconsin, U.S.
- Died: March 8, 1998 (aged 86); Richmond, Virginia, U.S.
- Burial place: Remlik Gardens, Remlik, Virginia
- Military career
- Allegiance: United States of America
- Branch: United States Army
- Rank: Captain
- Units: 2nd Battalion, 133rd Infantry Regiment, 34th Infantry Division
- Conflicts: World War II
- Awards: Medal of Honor

Beryl Richard Newman (November 2, 1911 – March 8, 1998) was a recipient of the Medal of Honor for his actions during World War II as a first lieutenant in the United States Army.

== Biography ==
Newman was a native of Baraboo, Wisconsin. During World War II, he served with Company F, 133rd Infantry Regiment, 34th Infantry Division.

Prior to World War II, he studied agriculture and played football at North Dakota State University, where he was also a member of the ROTC.

Near Cisterna, Italy on May 26, 1944, Newman and his platoon approached a German machine gun emplacement on the Anzio-Nettuno defense line. Newman, scouting ahead of his platoon, remained standing under enemy fire to ascertain the positions of the emplacements. Noting them, he proceeded to lead a machine gun unit from his platoon to a position from which they could open fire on the Germans. However, the fire was ineffective. Newman then single-handedly advanced on the two machine gun nests, wounding two Germans and causing the other two to flee. Three more Germans came rushing forward to another nest, but Newman killed two of them; the third fled. Newman and his platoon took eleven prisoners; Newman himself had destroyed three enemy machine gun emplacements. He was awarded the Medal of Honor by General Order #5 on January 15, 1945.

He retired from the service with the rank of captain. He is one of 61 Wisconsinites to be awarded the Medal of Honor, and one of twenty members of the 34th Infantry Division to be so honored. He was inducted into North Dakota State University's Bison Battalion Hall of Fame in 2011.

== Medal of Honor citation ==
Newman's official Medal of Honor citation reads:

For conspicuous gallantry and intrepidity above and beyond the call of duty on 26 May 1944. Attacking the strongly held German Anzio-Nettuno defense line near Cisterna, Italy, 1st Lt. Newman, in the lead of his platoon, was suddenly fired upon by 2 enemy machineguns located on the crest of a hill about 100 yards to his front. The 4 scouts with him immediately hit the ground, but 1st Lt. Newman remained standing in order to see the enemy positions and his platoon then about 100 yards behind. Locating the enemy nests, 1st Lt. Newman called back to his platoon and ordered 1 squad to advance to him and the other to flank the enemy to the right. Then, still standing upright in the face of the enemy machinegun fire, 1st Lt. Newman opened up with his tommygun on the enemy nests. From this range, his fire was not effective in covering the advance of his squads, and 1 squad was pinned down by the enemy fire. Seeing that his squad was unable to advance, 1st Lt. Newman, in full view of the enemy gunners and in the face of their continuous fire, advanced alone on the enemy nests. He returned their fire with his tommygun and succeeded in wounding a German in each of the nests. The remaining 2 Germans fled from the position into a nearby house. Three more enemy soldiers then came out of the house and ran toward a third machinegun. 1st Lt. Newman, still relentlessly advancing toward them, killed 1 before he reached the gun, the second before he could fire it. The third fled for his life back into the house. Covering his assault by firing into the doors and windows of the house, 1st Lt. Newman, boldly attacking by himself, called for the occupants to surrender to him. Gaining the house, he kicked in the door and went inside. Although armed with rifles and machine pistols, the 11 Germans there, apparently intimidated, surrendered to the lieutenant without further resistance, 1st Lt. Newman, single-handed, had silenced 3 enemy machineguns, wounded 2 Germans, killed 2 more, and took 11 prisoners. This demonstration of sheer courage, bravery, and willingness to close with the enemy even in the face of such heavy odds, instilled into these green troops the confidence of veterans and reflects the highest traditions of the U.S. Armed Forces.

== Awards and decorations ==

Badge	Combat Infantryman Badge		
1st row	Medal of Honor		
2nd row	Bronze Star Medal	Purple Heart	American Defense Service Medal
3rd row	American Campaign Medal	European–African–Middle Eastern Campaign Medal with 1 Campaign star	World War II Victory Medal

== See also ==
- List of Medal of Honor recipients for World War II
