= Island Woolen Company Office Building =

- U.S. National Register of Historic Places
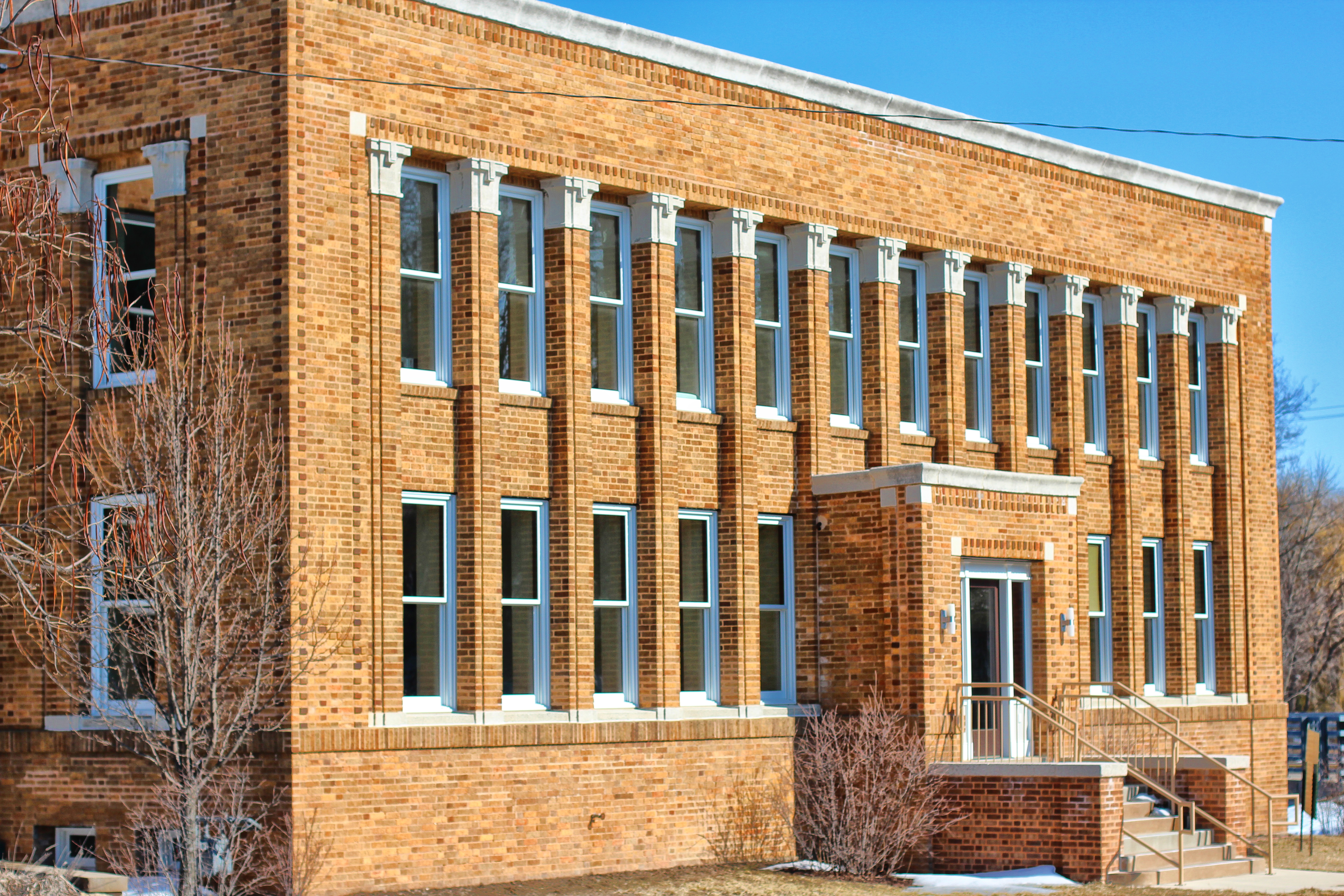

- Location within Wisconsin
- Coordinates: 43.469518°N 89.756713°W
- Built: 1917
- Architect: Claude and Starck
- Architectural style: Prairie School
- NRHP reference No.: 11000559
- Added to NRHP: 2011

The Island Woolen Company Office Building is an office building located in Baraboo, Wisconsin, United States, along the Baraboo River. The "island" where the building is located is actually a horseshoe bend in the Baraboo River. In 1839–1840 a dam and sawmill was built across the Baraboo River. In 1863 The Island Woolen Mill was constructed on the east side of the bend, with a raceway constructed to deliver water to the mill. The mill operated mostly successfully through the 1800s and by the early 20th century needed more space. The office building was built in 1917 and housed offices for the Island Woolen Company. It was built in the prairie school style by Claude and Starck architects from Madison Wisconsin, McFetridge the owner of the company, who had worked with and consulted with Frank Lloyd Wright, contributed to the design and finish of the building. The mill and office building continued to operate until its closure in 1949. The mill's dam was removed in 1997.
