= Seven Gables (Baraboo, Wisconsin) =

- U.S. National Register of Historic Places
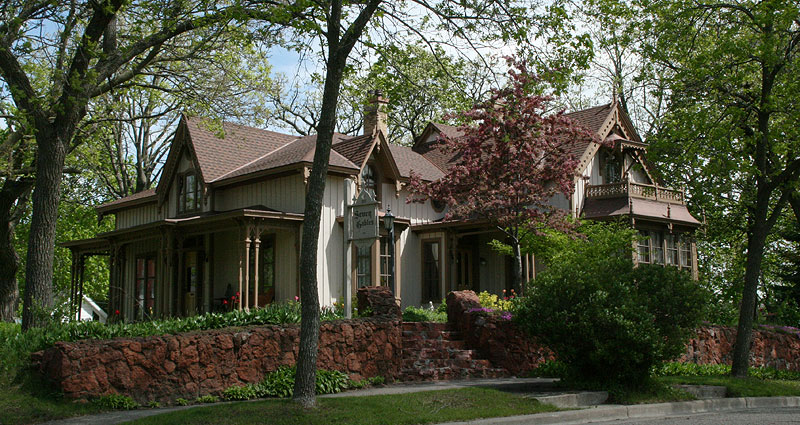

- Location within Wisconsin
- Location: 215 6th St., Baraboo, Wisconsin
- Coordinates: 43°28′23″N 89°44′23″W
- Area: 0.6 acres (0.24 ha)
- Built: 1860
- Architectural style: Gothic Revival
- NRHP reference No.: 78000140
- Added to NRHP: January 20, 1978

Seven Gables, also known as the Terrell Thomas House, is a historic house at 215 6th Street in Baraboo, Wisconsin. The house was built in 1860 for Terrell Thomas, a local banker and businessman. The house has a Gothic Revival design described as Downingesque, a term used for smaller Gothic houses inspired by architect Andrew Jackson Downing's design philosophy. Its design features an entrance pavilion topped by a gable roof with decorative bargeboard on its eaves, a side entrance on the west facade with a matching gable, a front-facing verandah with wooden brackets and detailing, and several dormers interrupting the main hip roof. John Durward, a Roman Catholic priest and the son of Durward's Glen founder Bernard Durward, bought the house in 1911; after his death in 1918, local district attorney and county judge Henry Jay Bohn lived in the house until 1929.

The house was added to the National Register of Historic Places on January 20, 1978.
