= A. G. Tuttle Estate =

Historic house in Baraboo, Wisconsin, US

- U.S. National Register of Historic Places
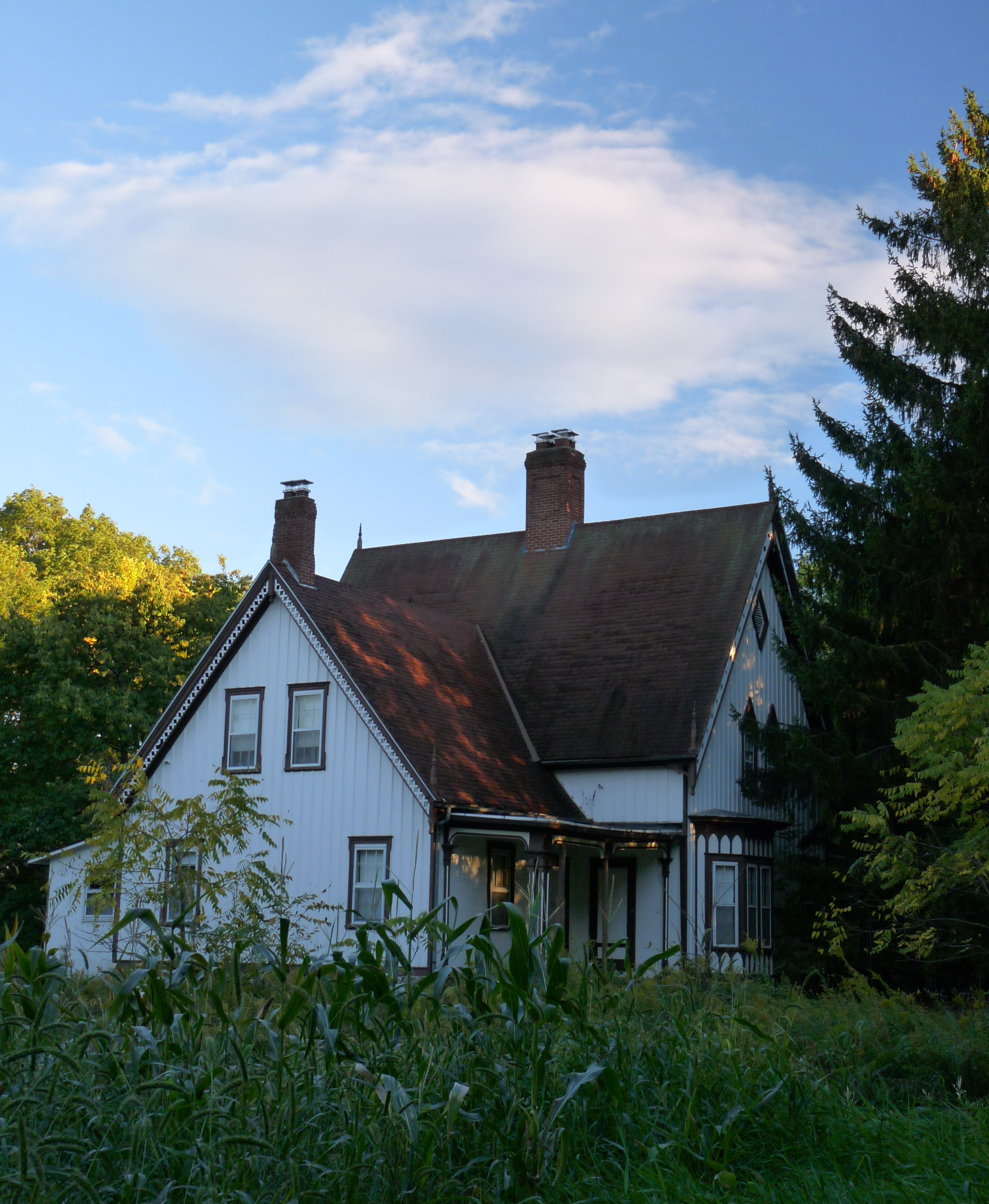

- Location within Wisconsin
- Location: S4456 Elizabeth St., Baraboo, Wisconsin
- Coordinates: 43°29′00″N 89°43′59″W
- Area: 2.8 acres (1.1 ha)
- Built: 1869
- Architectural style: Gothic Revival
- NRHP reference No.: 80000194
- Added to NRHP: November 6, 1980

The A. G. Tuttle Estate is a historic house at S4456 Elizabeth Street in Baraboo, Wisconsin. The house was built in 1869 for A. G. Tuttle, a merchant and nursery owner who moved to Baraboo from New England. Tuttle was known for developing local varieties of fruit, especially apples; a Russian apple variety he grew brought him customers from throughout Wisconsin and Minnesota, and he was president of the Wisconsin Horticultural Society for several years. Tuttle's house is designed in the Carpenter Gothic style; the style was most popular in the Eastern United States, including Tuttle's native New England, in the mid-nineteenth century. The house has a cross-gabled plan featuring steep gable ends with decorative bargeboard along their eaves, board and batten siding, a porch supported by wooden columns at the front entrance, and a bay window with wooden corbelling. The house's interior includes a trompe-l'oeil of Venus, a landscape mural in the dining room that features the house itself, a plaster rosette on the parlor ceiling, and many detailed moldings.

The house was added to the National Register of Historic Places on November 6, 1980.
