= Charles and Anna Ruhland House =

Historic house in Baraboo, Wisconsin, US

- U.S. National Register of Historic Places
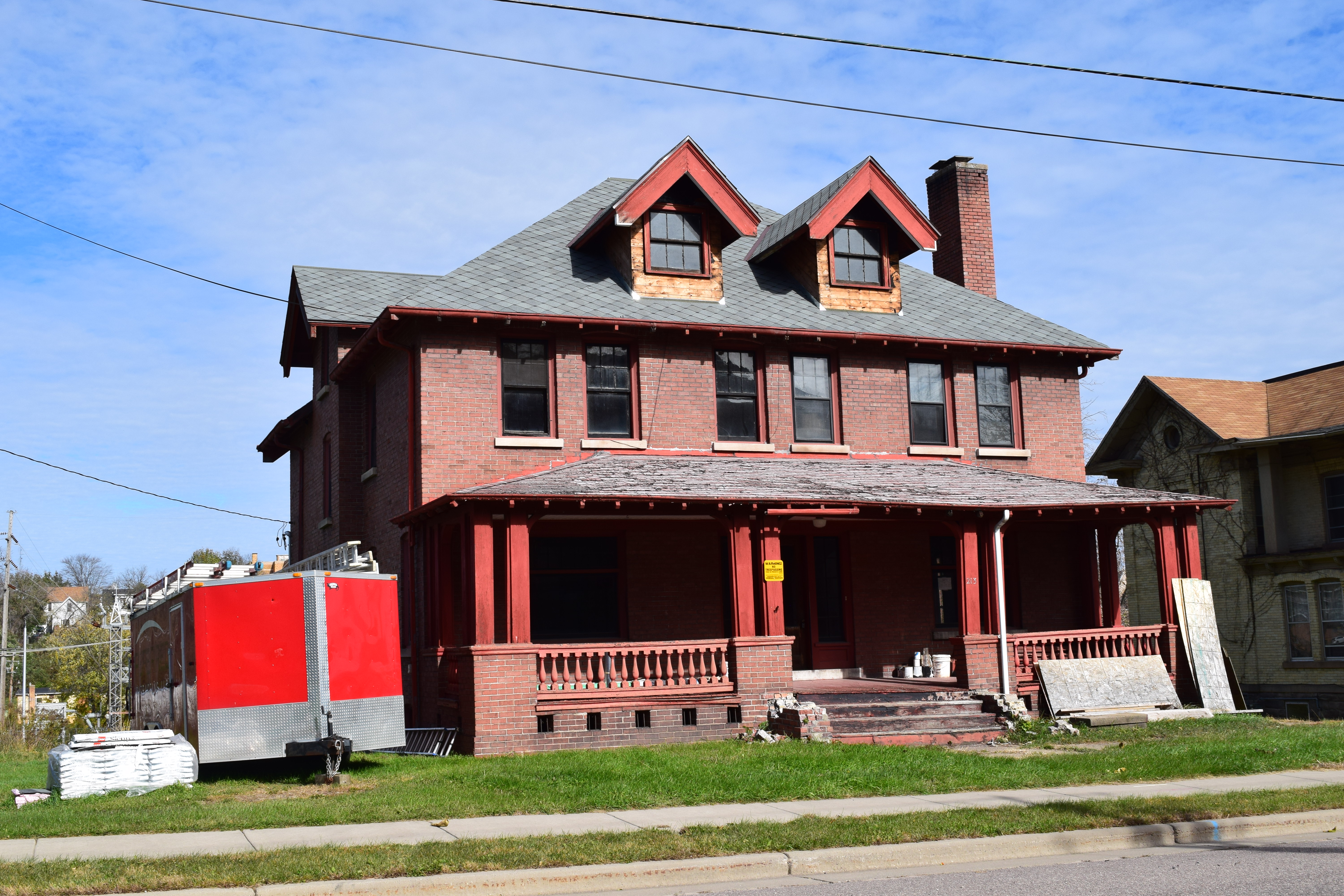

- Location within Wisconsin
- Location: 213 Lynn St., Baraboo, Wisconsin
- Coordinates: 43°27′55″N 89°44′30″W
- Built: 1909
- Architectural style: American Craftsman
- NRHP reference No.: 100000774
- Added to NRHP: March 20, 2017

The Charles and Anna Ruhland House is a historic house at 213 Lynn Street in Baraboo, Wisconsin. The house was built in 1909 for Charles Ruhland, owner of the Ruhland Brewing Company, and his wife Anna. It has an American Craftsman design, a style popularized in the early twentieth century which emphasized simplicity and harmony with nature; the architect who designed the house is unknown. The two-and-a-half story brick house features a wide front porch supported by wooden posts, exposed rafter tails at the edges of the roof, and a hip roof with gabled dormers. The interior has an open plan with large windows to let in natural light. While Charles Ruhland lost his brewery to bankruptcy in 1918, he and his family lived in the house until the late 1930s, when one of his former employees converted it to a boarding house.

The house was added to the National Register of Historic Places on March 20, 2017.
