= Louise M. Lawson =

American temperance activist (1855 – 1951)

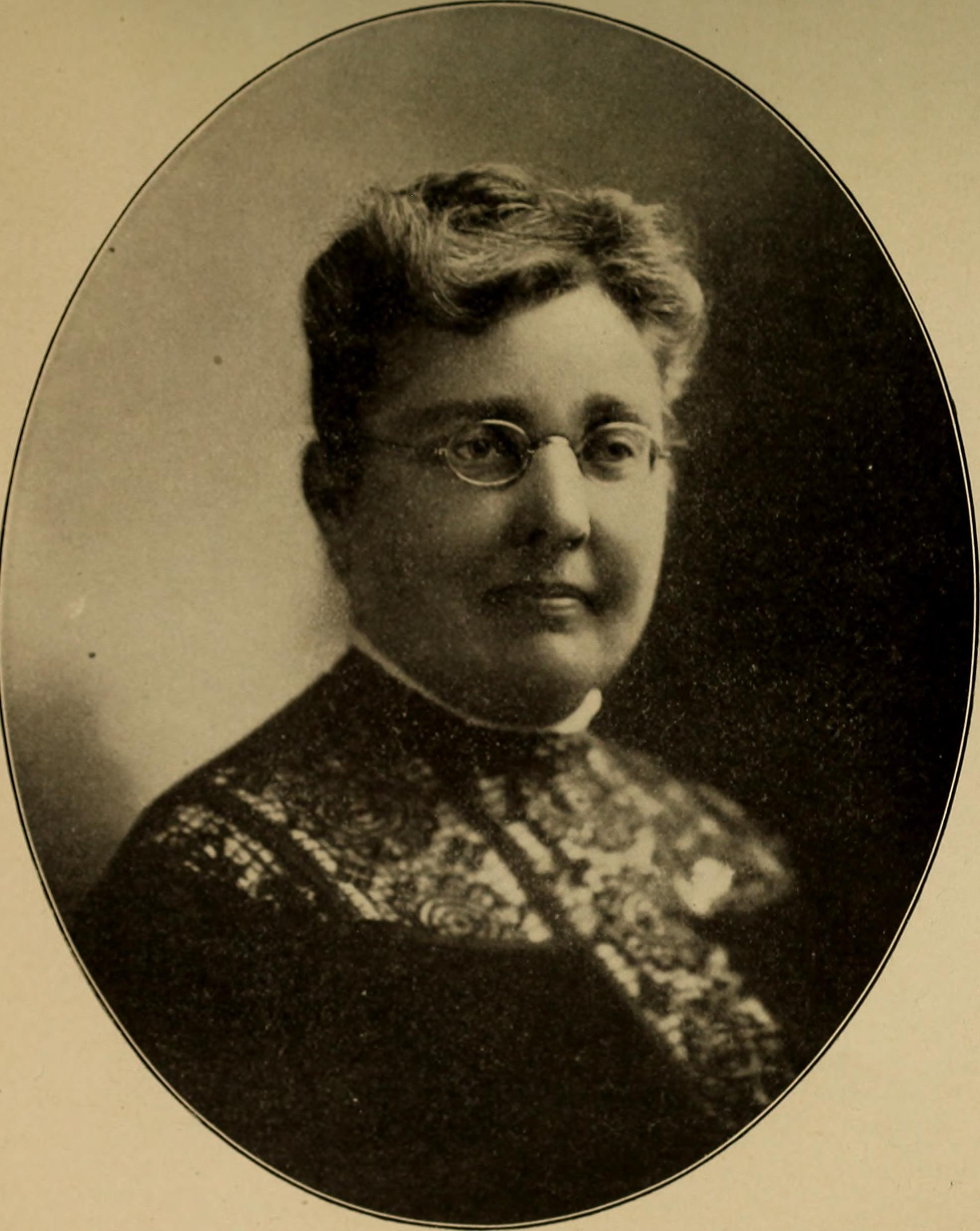
Mrs. W. A. Lawson

Louise M. Lawson (née Andrews; 1855–1951) was an American temperance activist who served as President of the Wisconsin State Woman's Christian Temperance Union (WCTU).

== Biography ==
Louise Mahala Andrews was born at Baraboo, Wisconsin, May 10, 1855.

She was educated in the Wisconsin public schools.

On August 10, 1870, she married William Averill Lawson (d. December 7, 1899), also of Baraboo.

Early becoming interested in the temperance movement, Lawson was an active member of the local Band of Hope and of the International Organisation of Good Templars (IOGT), and held office in both organizations. She was for several years president of the Sauk County, Wisconsin WCTU, and in 1890, was elected corresponding secretary of the Wisconsin Union. In 1905, she was chosen vice-president of the State WCTU, and in 1907, she was elected State president, which office she held for eleven years, and at the termination of this period, was made president emeritus for life. While retiring from this position in 1918, she continued to represent the WCTU on the Woman's Committee of the State Council of National Defense, and continued to hold two State WCTU offices.

In 1902, she was appointed State lecturer for the organization, and served in that capacity at least until 1928. At various times, she was State Superintendent of Legislation, of Christian Citizenship, and of Parliamentary Usage. She was a delegate to the international conventions at Boston, Brookline, Glasgow, and Philadelphia.

As a reward for services rendered, the Wisconsin State Union tendered to Lawson a life membership in the State, National, and World's WCTU, and her name was placed in the Book of Remembrance at the national headquarters of the organization at Evanston, Illinois.

Louise M. Lawson died in Chicago, Illinois, August 11, 1951. Interment was in Baraboo, Wisconsin.
