= Baraboo, Wisconsin =

- City
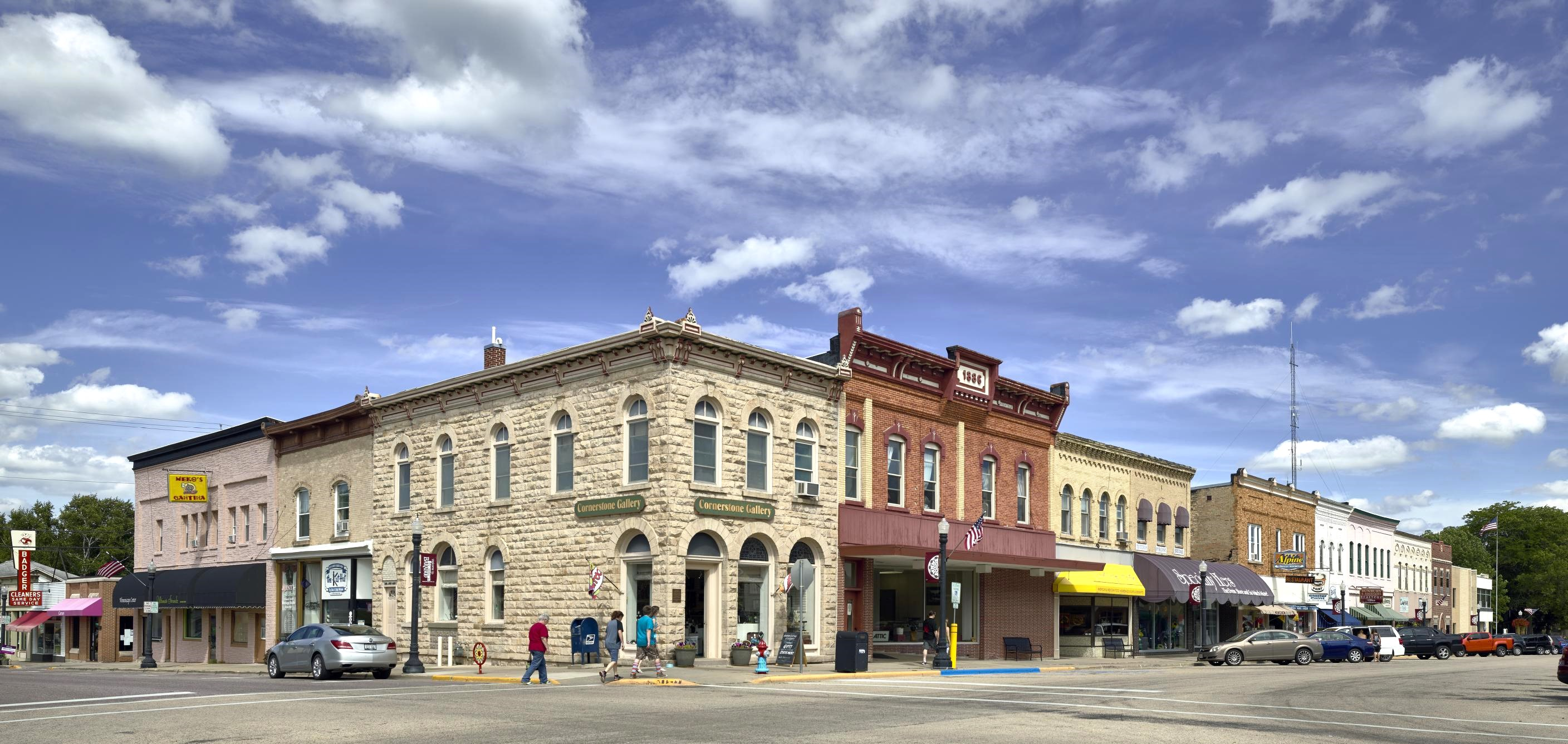
- Downtown Baraboo Historic District
- Interactive map of Baraboo, Wisconsin
- Location within Wisconsin Location within the United States
- Coordinates: 43°28′5″N 89°44′30″W
- Country: United States
- State: Wisconsin
- County: Sauk
- Incorporated (village): April 6, 1866
- Incorporated (city): February 25, 1882

Government
  - Type: Mayor – Council
  - Mayor: Rob Nelson

Area
  - City: 7.43 sq mi (19.25 km^{2})
  - Land: 7.35 sq mi (19.03 km^{2})
  - Water: 0.085 sq mi (0.22 km^{2})
- Elevation: 879 ft (268 m)

Population (2020)
  - City: 12,556
  - Density: 1,709.2/sq mi (659.9/km^{2})
  - Metro: 65,763
- Time zone: UTC−6 (Central)
  - Summer (DST): UTC−5 (CDT)
- ZIP Code: 53913
- Area code: 608
- GNIS feature ID: 1582749
- FIPS code: 55-04625
- Website: baraboowi.gov

Baraboo (/ˈbɛərəbuː/ BAIR-ə-boo) is the county seat of Sauk County, Wisconsin, United States, located along the Baraboo River. The population was 12,556 at the 2020 census. The most populous city in the county, Baraboo is the principal city of the Baraboo micropolitan statistical area, which comprises a portion of the Madison combined statistical area.

Baraboo is home to the Circus World Museum and the former headquarters and winter home of the Ringling Brothers Circus. The Al. Ringling Theatre is an active landmark in the city. Baraboo is near Devil's Lake State Park and Aldo Leopold Shack and Farm. The Ho-Chunk Nation of Wisconsin has an active cultural and community presence in the Baraboo area.

== History ==
The area around Baraboo was the site of a Kickapoo village as early as 1665. The current community was established by Abe Wood in 1838, and was originally known as the village of Adams. In 1839 several settlers arrived and started building cabins, and a saw mill. In 1846 it became the county seat of Sauk County after a fierce fight with the nearby village of Reedsburg. In 1852, the village was renamed "Baraboo", after the nearby river. It was incorporated as a village in 1866 and as a city in 1882.

In the 1860s, the city had surpassed a population of 2,000, and many businesses started to form, including grocery stores, banks, and hotels. In 1872, the Chicago and North Western Railway (C&NW) was built. Baraboo became home to several saw mills during this time, because of its location near the Baraboo and Wisconsin Rivers.

In 1884, the Ringling Brothers Circus was established in Baraboo by circus performers and tourers the Ringling brothers, after they settled in the city in 1875 and performed their first show in Mazomanie, Wisconsin in 1882. Several other circuses then came to the city, which earned Baraboo the nickname "Circus City".

Located south of Baraboo in the Census-designated place of Bluffview, was the Badger Ordnance Works, which was the largest munitions factory in the world during World War II. It was later demolished and now the land is a part of the Sauk Prairie Recreation Area.

Cirrus, a manufacturer of single-engine aircraft, was founded in a rural Baraboo barn in 1984 by the Klapmeier brothers. After a few years of designing the VK-30, they relocated to the Baraboo–Dells Airport and in 1994 moved the company to its present-day home in Duluth, Minnesota.

== Geography ==
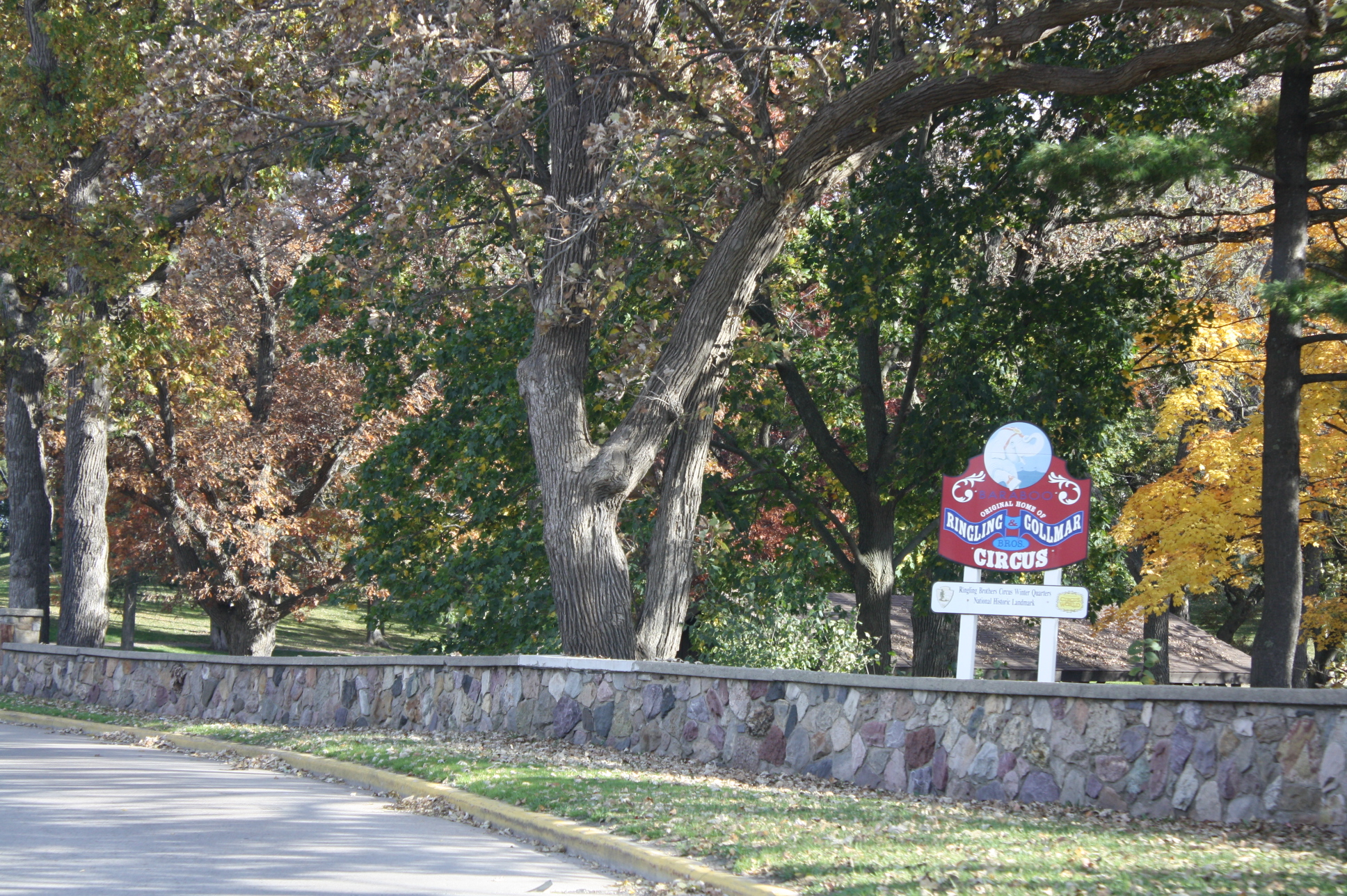
Baraboo welcome sign on WIS 33

According to the United States Census Bureau, the city has a total area of 7.47 square miles (19.35 km^{2}), of which 7.39 square miles (19.14 km^{2}) is land and 0.08 square miles (0.21 km^{2}) is water.

West Baraboo, a suburb of Baraboo, borders the city on its west side.

Baraboo gives its name to the Baraboo Syncline, a doubly plunging, asymmetric syncline in Proterozoic-aged Baraboo Quartzite. Researchers at the University of Wisconsin, particularly Charles R. Van Hise, used the syncline to demonstrate that small-scale deformational structures in isolated outcrops reflect larger regional structures and that sedimentary structures could indicate the original top-facing direction within elaborately deformed strata. These two principles sparked a global revolution in structural geology during the 1920s.

The nearby Baraboo Hills are designated one of the "Last Great Places" by the Nature Conservancy because of its rare rocks, plants and animals. The hills were created by glacial action, and in some points poke up from the flat terrain to form a stark contrast. Some of these features were created when a glacial pocket was formed during the Wisconsin glaciation where the advance of the glacier halted, along the edge of what is known as the Driftless Area. Devil's Lake State Park, Wisconsin's largest state park, contains large areas of the Baraboo Hills. Pewits Nest is located outside Baraboo.

=== Climate ===
According to the Köppen Climate Classification system, Baraboo has a warm-summer humid continental climate, abbreviated "Dfb" on climate maps. The hottest temperature recorded in Baraboo was 103 °F (39.4 °C) on July 5–7, 2012, while the coldest temperature recorded was −45 °F (−42.8 °C) on January 30, 1951.

Climate data for Baraboo, Wisconsin, 1991–2020 normals, extremes 1893–present
Month	Jan	Feb	Mar	Apr	May	Jun	Jul	Aug	Sep	Oct	Nov	Dec	Year
Record high °F (°C)	60 (16)	72 (22)	84 (29)	92 (33)	96 (36)	102 (39)	103 (39)	102 (39)	99 (37)	92 (33)	76 (24)	68 (20)	103 (39)
Mean maximum °F (°C)	46.8 (8.2)	52.7 (11.5)	67.3 (19.6)	78.5 (25.8)	86.5 (30.3)	91.4 (33.0)	92.9 (33.8)	91.3 (32.9)	87.8 (31.0)	80.6 (27.0)	65.4 (18.6)	52.1 (11.2)	94.9 (34.9)
Mean daily maximum °F (°C)	27.5 (−2.5)	32.2 (0.1)	44.1 (6.7)	57.2 (14.0)	69.6 (20.9)	79.0 (26.1)	82.8 (28.2)	80.9 (27.2)	73.7 (23.2)	60.5 (15.8)	45.5 (7.5)	33.2 (0.7)	57.2 (14.0)
Daily mean °F (°C)	18.6 (−7.4)	22.4 (−5.3)	33.6 (0.9)	45.6 (7.6)	57.9 (14.4)	67.6 (19.8)	71.5 (21.9)	69.3 (20.7)	61.7 (16.5)	49.5 (9.7)	36.6 (2.6)	24.9 (−3.9)	46.6 (8.1)
Mean daily minimum °F (°C)	9.6 (−12.4)	12.5 (−10.8)	23.1 (−4.9)	34.1 (1.2)	46.2 (7.9)	56.2 (13.4)	60.1 (15.6)	57.6 (14.2)	49.7 (9.8)	38.4 (3.6)	27.6 (−2.4)	16.6 (−8.6)	36.0 (2.2)
Mean minimum °F (°C)	−15.9 (−26.6)	−11.3 (−24.1)	−2.3 (−19.1)	16.9 (−8.4)	28.8 (−1.8)	39.4 (4.1)	46.4 (8.0)	43.4 (6.3)	31.7 (−0.2)	21.3 (−5.9)	8.1 (−13.3)	−6.6 (−21.4)	−19.6 (−28.7)
Record low °F (°C)	−45 (−43)	−41 (−41)	−34 (−37)	−2 (−19)	19 (−7)	31 (−1)	38 (3)	34 (1)	20 (−7)	10 (−12)	−17 (−27)	−35 (−37)	−45 (−43)
Average precipitation inches (mm)	1.35 (34)	1.36 (35)	2.21 (56)	4.16 (106)	4.28 (109)	5.58 (142)	4.79 (122)	4.53 (115)	3.85 (98)	2.91 (74)	2.20 (56)	1.68 (43)	38.90 (988)
Average snowfall inches (cm)	11.3 (29)	10.1 (26)	5.9 (15)	2.6 (6.6)	0.0 (0.0)	0.0 (0.0)	0.0 (0.0)	0.0 (0.0)	0.0 (0.0)	0.4 (1.0)	2.1 (5.3)	10.3 (26)	42.7 (108.9)
Average precipitation days (≥ 0.01 in)	8.3	7.3	9.1	11.2	13.1	11.8	10.2	10.1	10.4	10.4	8.1	8.9	118.9
Average snowy days (≥ 0.1 in)	6.7	5.8	3.1	1.0	0.0	0.0	0.0	0.0	0.0	0.2	1.5	5.5	23.8
Source 1: NOAA
Source 2: National Weather Service

== Demographics ==
Historical population
Census	Pop.	Note	%±
1850	255		—
1860	1,360		433.3%
1870	1,528		12.4%
1880	3,266		113.7%
1890	4,605		41.0%
1900	5,751		24.9%
1910	6,324		10.0%
1920	5,538		−12.4%
1930	5,545		0.1%
1940	6,415		15.7%
1950	7,264		13.2%
1960	7,660		5.5%
1970	7,931		3.5%
1980	8,081		1.9%
1990	9,203		13.9%
2000	10,711		16.4%
2010	12,048		12.5%
2020	12,556		4.2%
U.S. Decennial Census

Baraboo forms the core of the United States Census Bureau's Baraboo Micropolitan Statistical Area, which includes all of Sauk County (2000 population: 55,225). The Baraboo μSA is just northwest of the Madison metropolitan area, with which it forms the Census Bureau's Baraboo-Madison Consolidated Metropolitan Statistical Area.

=== 2020 census ===
As of the 2020 census, Baraboo had a population of 12,556. The median age was 39.5 years. 22.0% of residents were under the age of 18 and 19.6% of residents were 65 years of age or older. For every 100 females there were 95.2 males, and for every 100 females age 18 and over there were 93.3 males age 18 and over.

97.8% of residents lived in urban areas, while 2.2% lived in rural areas.

There were 5,442 households in Baraboo, of which 27.3% had children under the age of 18 living in them. Of all households, 40.7% were married-couple households, 20.7% were households with a male householder and no spouse or partner present, and 29.9% were households with a female householder and no spouse or partner present. About 35.0% of all households were made up of individuals and 15.8% had someone living alone who was 65 years of age or older.

The population density was 1,709.2 inhabitants per square mile (659.9/km^{2}). There were 5,776 housing units at an average density of 786.3 per square mile (303.6/km^{2}), of which 5.8% were vacant. The homeowner vacancy rate was 1.0% and the rental vacancy rate was 6.5%.

Racial composition as of the 2020 census
Race	Number	Percent
White	11,045	88.0%
Black or African American	168	1.3%
American Indian and Alaska Native	172	1.4%
Asian	123	1.0%
Native Hawaiian and Other Pacific Islander	2	0.0%
Some other race	345	2.7%
Two or more races	701	5.6%
Hispanic or Latino (of any race)	745	5.9%

=== 2010 census ===
As of the census of 2010, there were 12,048 people, 5,161 households, and 3,016 families residing in the city. The population density was 1,630.3 inhabitants per square mile (629.5/km^{2}). There were 5,619 housing units at an average density of 760.4 per square mile (293.6/km^{2}). The racial makeup of the city was 94.0% White, 1.3% African American, 1.0% Native American, 0.5% Asian, 0.1% Pacific Islander, 1.5% from other races, and 1.6% from two or more races. Hispanic or Latino people of any race were 3.7% of the population.

There were 5,161 households, of which 30.2% had children under the age of 18 living with them, 41.1% were married couples living together, 11.8% had a female householder with no husband present, 5.5% had a male householder with no wife present, and 41.6% were non-families. 34.4% of all households were made up of individuals, and 14.7% had someone living alone who was 65 years of age or older. The average household size was 2.26 and the average family size was 2.89.

The median age in the city was 38 years. 23.8% of residents were under the age of 18; 8% were between the ages of 18 and 24; 27.5% were from 25 to 44; 25.1% were from 45 to 64; and 15.6% were 65 years of age or older. The gender makeup of the city was 49.1% male and 50.9% female.

=== 2000 census ===
As of the census of 2000, there were 10,711 people, 4,467 households, and 2,733 families residing in the city. The population density was 2,030.2 people per square mile (783.2/km^{2}). There were 4,718 housing units at an average density of 894.3 per square mile (345.0 persons/km^{2}). The racial makeup of the city was 97.12% White, 0.51% African American, 0.77% Native American, 0.52% Asian, 0.00% Pacific Islander, 0.41% from other races, and 0.66% from two or more races. 1.57% of the population were Hispanic or Latino of any race.

There were 4,467 households, out of which 31.0% had children under the age of 18 living with them, 46.9% were married couples living together, 10.8% had a female householder with no husband present, and 38.8% were non-families. 32.1% of all households were made up of individuals, and 13.5% had someone living alone who was 65 years of age or older. The average household size was 2.33 and the average family size was 2.96.

In the city, the population was spread out, with 24.9% under the age of 18, 8.8% from 18 to 24, 30.5% from 25 to 44, 20.1% from 45 to 64, and 15.7% who were 65 years of age or older. The median age was 36 years. For every 100 females, there were 93.0 males. For every 100 females age 18 and over, there were 90.0 males.

The median income for a household in the city was $38,375, and the median income for a family was $48,149. Males had a median income of $32,775 versus $22,813 for females. The per capita income for the city was $19,304. 6.6% of the population and 4.7% of families were below the poverty line, including 6.7% of those under the age of 18 and 10.0% of those age 65 or older.

== Arts and culture ==
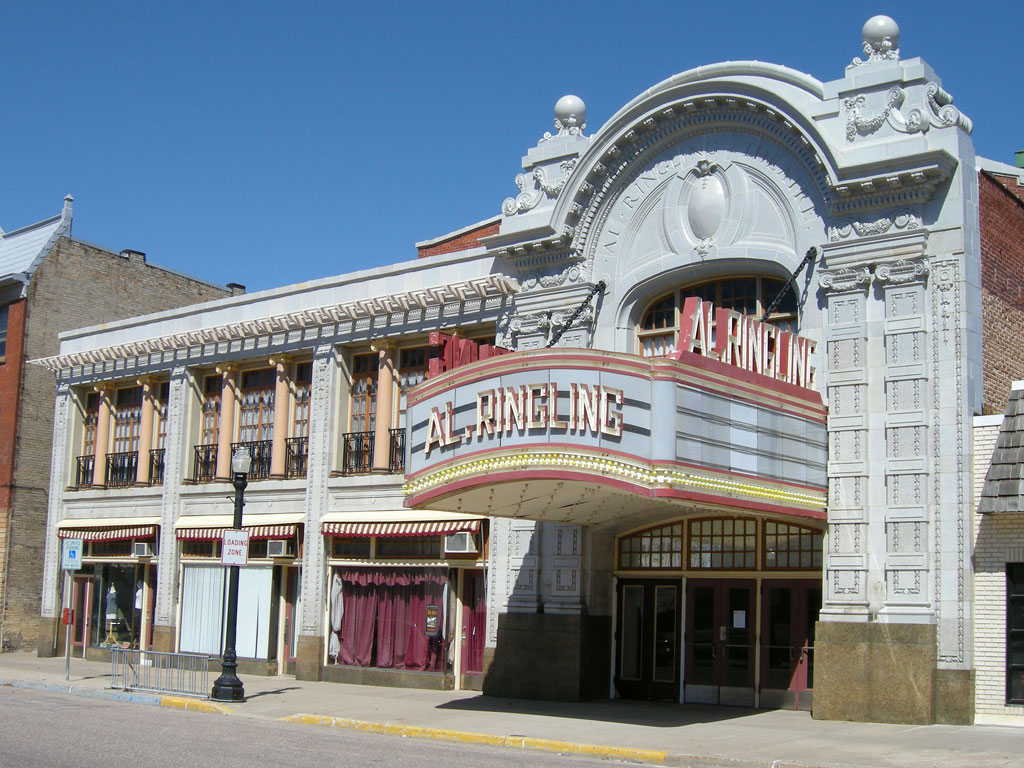
Al. Ringling Theatre

Baraboo includes the Downtown Baraboo Historic District, which consists of 75 commercial and civic buildings built between 1870 and 1938. The Sauk County Courthouse is in the center of the district, and it serves the county. Other historic buildings in the city include Carnegie-Schadde Memorial Public Library, William Clark House, Gust Brothers' Store, Island Woolen Company Office Building, Walworth D. Porter Duplex Residence, Al. Ringling Theatre, Albrecht C. Ringling House, Charles Ringling House, Charles and Anna Ruhland House, Seven Gables, Thompson House Hotel, A. G. Tuttle Estate and Jacob Van Orden House.

The Aldo Leopold Shack and Farm near Baraboo was acquired in the 1930s as a family summer retreat by the noted conservationist and writer Aldo Leopold and is the landscape that inspired his conservation ethic and the writing of his best-known work, A Sand County Almanac.

Hank Snow's 1959 song "I've Been Everywhere", covered by Johnny Cash, mentions visiting Baraboo.

== Government ==
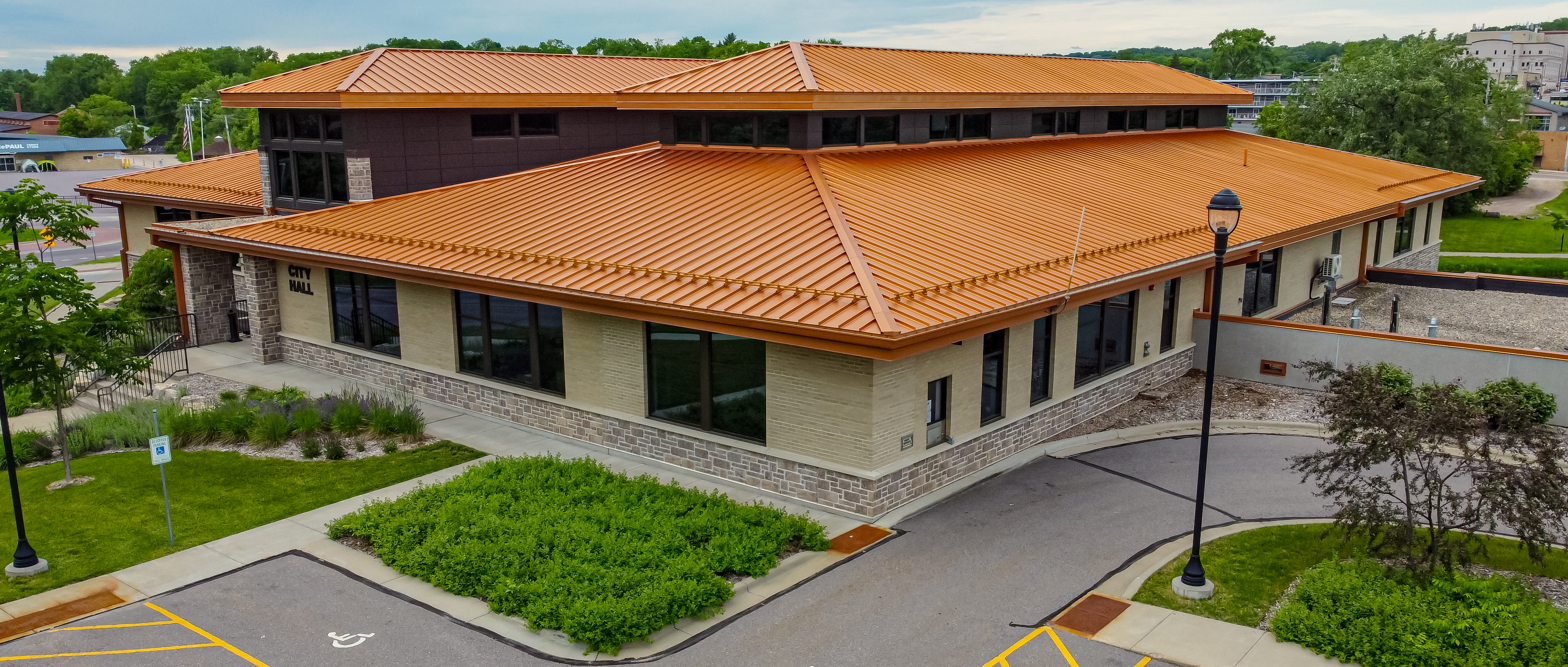
Baraboo City Hall

A city hall building opened in 1967, and another location finished construction in 2018 at a cost of $9 million. A post office opened in 1961.

== Education ==
A campus of the University of Wisconsin–Platteville Baraboo Sauk County is located in Baraboo.

The Baraboo School District has four elementary schools serving students in grades 1 through 5, one kindergarten center, one middle school and one high school (Baraboo High School). There are also three parochial schools: St. Joseph's Catholic School, which serves Pre-K through sixth grade; St. John's Lutheran School of the WELS, serving Pre-K through eighth grade; and Community Christian School, serving 4K through high school.

The Baraboo Public Library serves the community. The former Free Congregational Society church was demolished by 1902 for the library's construction.

== Transportation ==
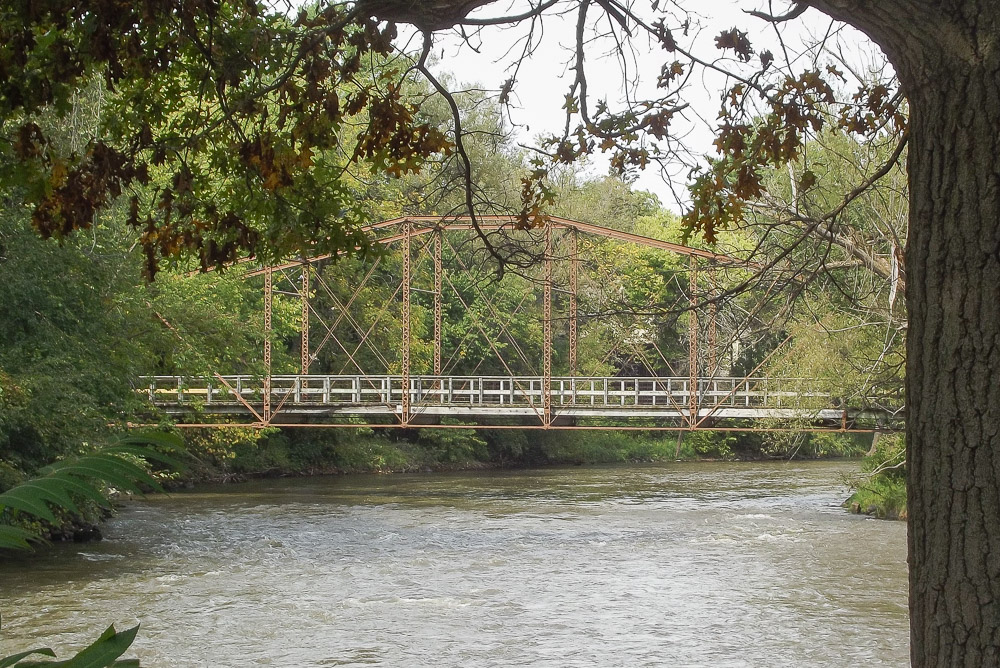
Manchester Street Bridge

The Baraboo-Wisconsin Dells Airport (KDLL) serves the city and surrounding communities, and is located on Bus. US 12 3 miles north of the city. State Highways 33, 113, 136, and U.S. 12 pass through Baraboo. There is access to Interstate 90/94 nearby. The Wisconsin & Southern Railroad provides freight rail service to Baraboo via the Reedsburg Subdivision, the nearest Amtrak passenger rail station is in neighboring Wisconsin Dells. Dial-a-ride transit service is available in the city through Baraboo Transit.

Baraboo station was located on the Chicago and North Western Railway and served both passengers and freight traffic as well as housing the Madison Division offices of the C&NW. Passenger service to the depot ended in 1963 with the elimination of the Rochester 400. As of 2022, the Sauk County Historical Society hopes to restore the depot into a museum and community gathering space.

Megabus offers daily bus service from Baraboo to La Crosse and Milwaukee Intermodal Station via Madison.

== Notable people ==
- Donald R. Atkinson, educator and writer
- Frank Avery, Wisconsin state senator
- Stan Barnes, judge, United States Court of Appeals for the Ninth Circuit
- Virgil H. Cady, Wisconsin state representative
- Tiny Cahoon (1900–1973), NFL player
- Jorge A. Carow, Wisconsin state representative
- Ella D. Crawford, temperance movement organizer
- John V. Diener, mayor of Green Bay, Wisconsin
- Evan Alfred Evans, judge of the U.S. Court of Appeals
- Evan Glodell, film director, producer, writer, and actor
- Elna Jane Hilliard Grahn, educator
- Henry C. Hansbrough, U.S. senator from North Dakota
- John R. Hofstatter, Wisconsin State Representative
- Guy E. Holmes, musician and composer
- John J. Jenkins, U.S. representative
- Robert J. Keller, Wisconsin state representative
- Alan and Dale Klapmeier, founders of Cirrus Aircraft
- Len Koenecke (1904–1935), MLB player
- Belle Case La Follette, lawyer and activist
- Nancy Lange, First Lady of Peru
- Louise M. Lawson (1855–1951), president, Wisconsin State Woman's Christian Temperance Union
- Aldo Leopold, naturalist
- Daryl Morey, former general manager of the Houston Rockets (2007–2020), current president of basketball operations for the Philadelphia 76ers
- Mary Mortimer (1816–1877), British-born American educator
- Beryl Newman, Medal of Honor recipient
- John Ringling North, president and director of Ringling Bros. and Barnum & Bailey Circus
- Stuart Palmer (1905–1968), mystery novelist
- Delando Pratt, Wisconsin state representative
- Mike Reinfeldt, NFL player and executive
- Cyrus Remington, Wisconsin state representative and jurist
- Bradbury Robinson, threw the first forward pass in football history, grew up in Baraboo
- Lyle Seeman, (born in Baraboo) military engineer, administrator, and commander involved in the Manhattan Project; college football player for the West Point team
- Algie Martin Simons, socialist newspaper editor, attended high school in Baraboo
- Terry Stieve, NFL player
- Walter Terry, Wisconsin legislator
- John M. True, Wisconsin legislator
- C. F. Viebahn, Wisconsin State Representative
- David Vittum, Wisconsin state senator
- Lewis N. Wood, Wisconsin state representative
- Edwin E. Woodman, Wisconsin state senator
