= Carnegie-Schadde Memorial Public Library =

- Baraboo Public Library
- U.S. National Register of Historic Places
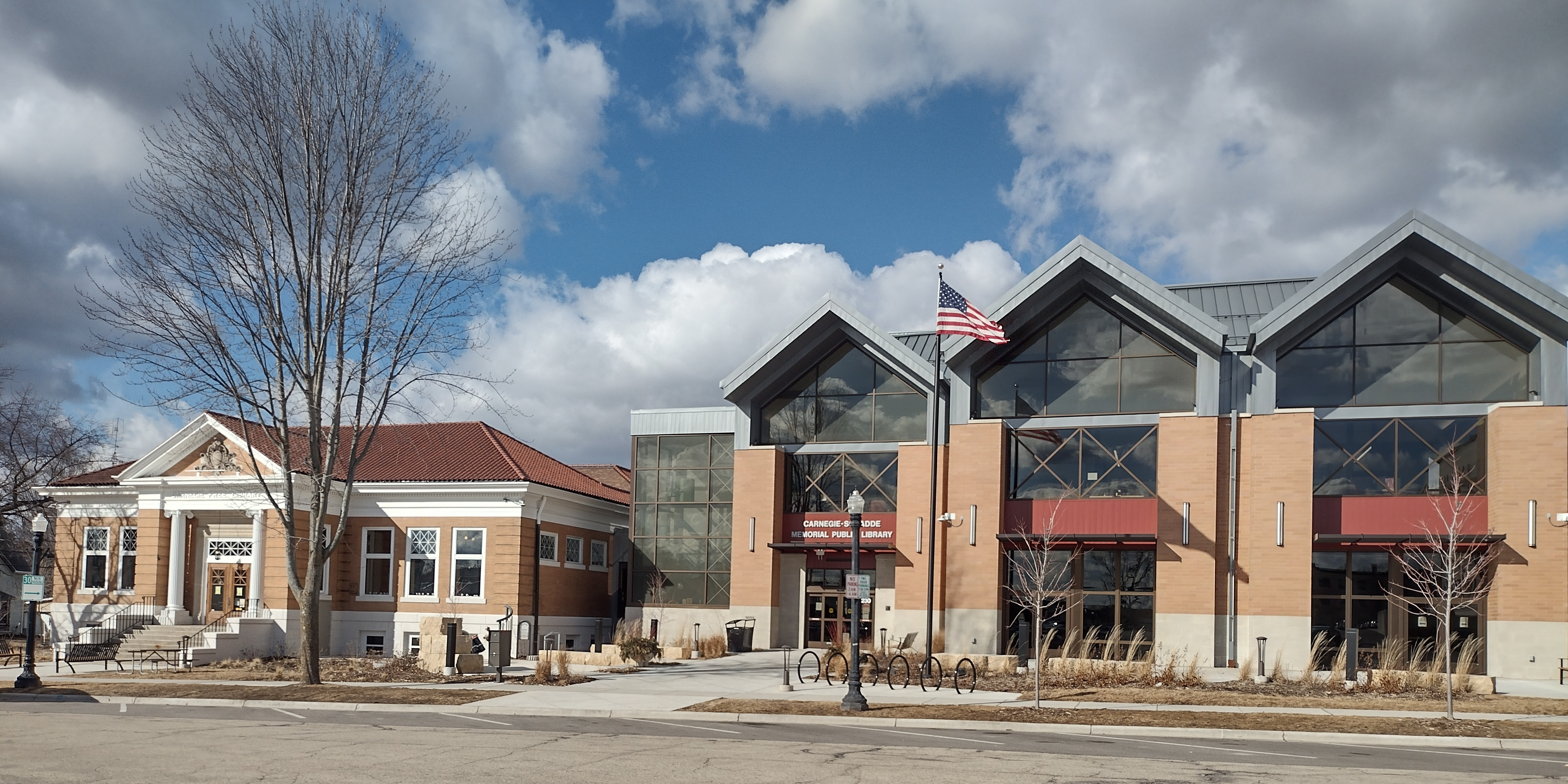

- Location within Wisconsin
- Location: 230 4th Ave., Baraboo, Wisconsin
- Coordinates: 43°28′16″N 89°44′44″W
- Area: less than one acre
- Built: 1903
- Architect: Claude & Starck
- Architectural style: Neoclassical
- NRHP reference No.: 81000058
- Added to NRHP: September 14, 1981

The Baraboo Public Library, also known as the Carnegie-Schadde Memorial Public Library, is the public library serving Baraboo, Wisconsin. Located at 230 4th Avenue, it was built in 1903 as one of the state's first small-scale Carnegie libraries. Claude and Starck of Madison designed the Neoclassical building; the firm designed 39 libraries in the early twentieth century, many of which were funded by Carnegie, and the Baraboo library was one of their first works. The library's design features a projecting entrance portico flanked by Ionic columns and topped with a pediment and a dentillated entablature along the bottom of the tiled hip roof.

The building was added to the National Register of Historic Places on September 14, 1981. The library is still in use and was expanded in 2021 using funds donated by local business owner Juanita Schadde.
