= Tiny Cahoon =

American football player and coach (1900–1973)

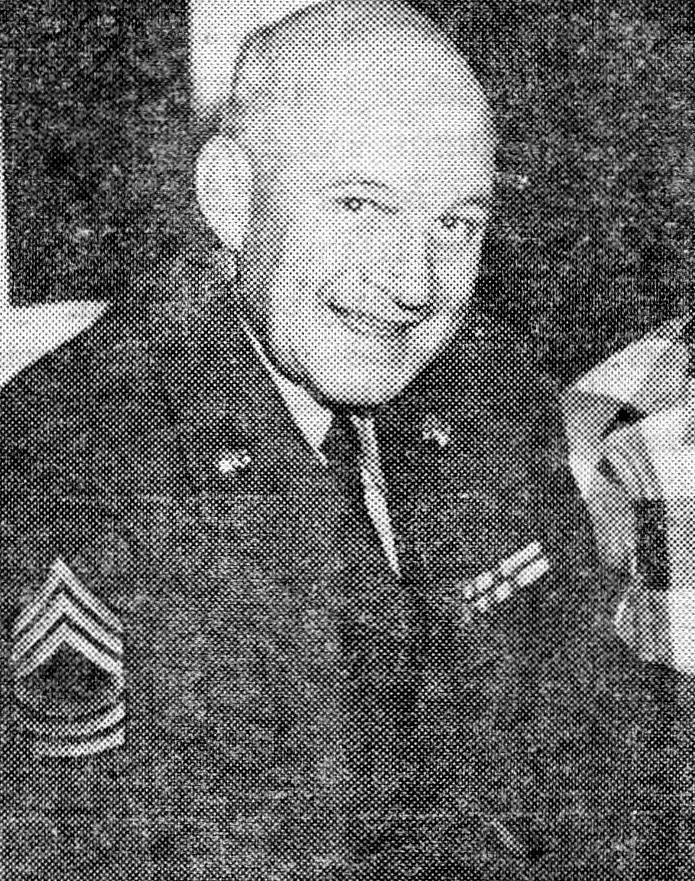
- Cahoon, circa 1955

No. 10, 30, 40
- Position: Tackle

Personal information
- Born: May 22, 1900; Baraboo, Wisconsin, U.S.
- Died: February 3, 1973 (aged 72); San Francisco, California, U.S.
- Listed height: 6 ft 2 in (1.88 m)
- Listed weight: 235 lb (107 kg)

Career information
- High school: Baraboo (WI)
- College: Montana, Gonzaga

Career history
- Green Bay Packers (1926–1929)

Awards and highlights
- NFL champion (1929); Gonzaga Athletic Hall of Fame (1991)

Career NFL statistics
- Games played: 31
- Games started: 27
- Touchdowns: 1
- Stats at Pro Football Reference

Ivan Wells "Tiny" Cahoon (May 22, 1900 – February 3, 1973) was an American football player and coach. He played professionally as a tackle for the Green Bay Packers of the National Football League (NFL) from 1926 to 1929. He played college football at the University of Montana and at Gonzaga University.

== Biography ==
Cahoon was born on May 22, 1900, in Baraboo, Wisconsin. He played college football under head coach Gus Dorais at Gonzaga, and was part of the school's undefeated team in 1924. After graduating from Gonzaga in 1925, Cahoon taught and coached at Libby High School in Montana for a year, then played pro football. He was a tackle for the Green Bay Packers for four seasons from 1926 until 1929, when a knee injury ended his playing career. He coached high school football at West De Pere in Wisconsin while a pro player, moved to Green Bay West High School in 1933, and to Monmouth College in Illinois in 1938.

Cahoon moved to the professional Milwaukee Chiefs, a new team in the American Football League in 1940 and 1941, then entered the United States Army during World War II, and coached football service teams. In 1951, he returned to Gonzaga University as an ROTC instructor.

== Head coaching record ==
=== College ===
Year	Team	Overall	Conference	Standing	Bowl/playoffs
Monmouth Fighting Scots (Midwest Conference) (1938–1939)
1938	Monmouth	5–5	2–3	T–5th	
1939	Monmouth	6–2–2	2–2–2	T–4th	
Monmouth:		11–7–2	4–5–2		
Total:		11–7–2			
