= Gust Brothers' Store =

- U.S. National Register of Historic Places
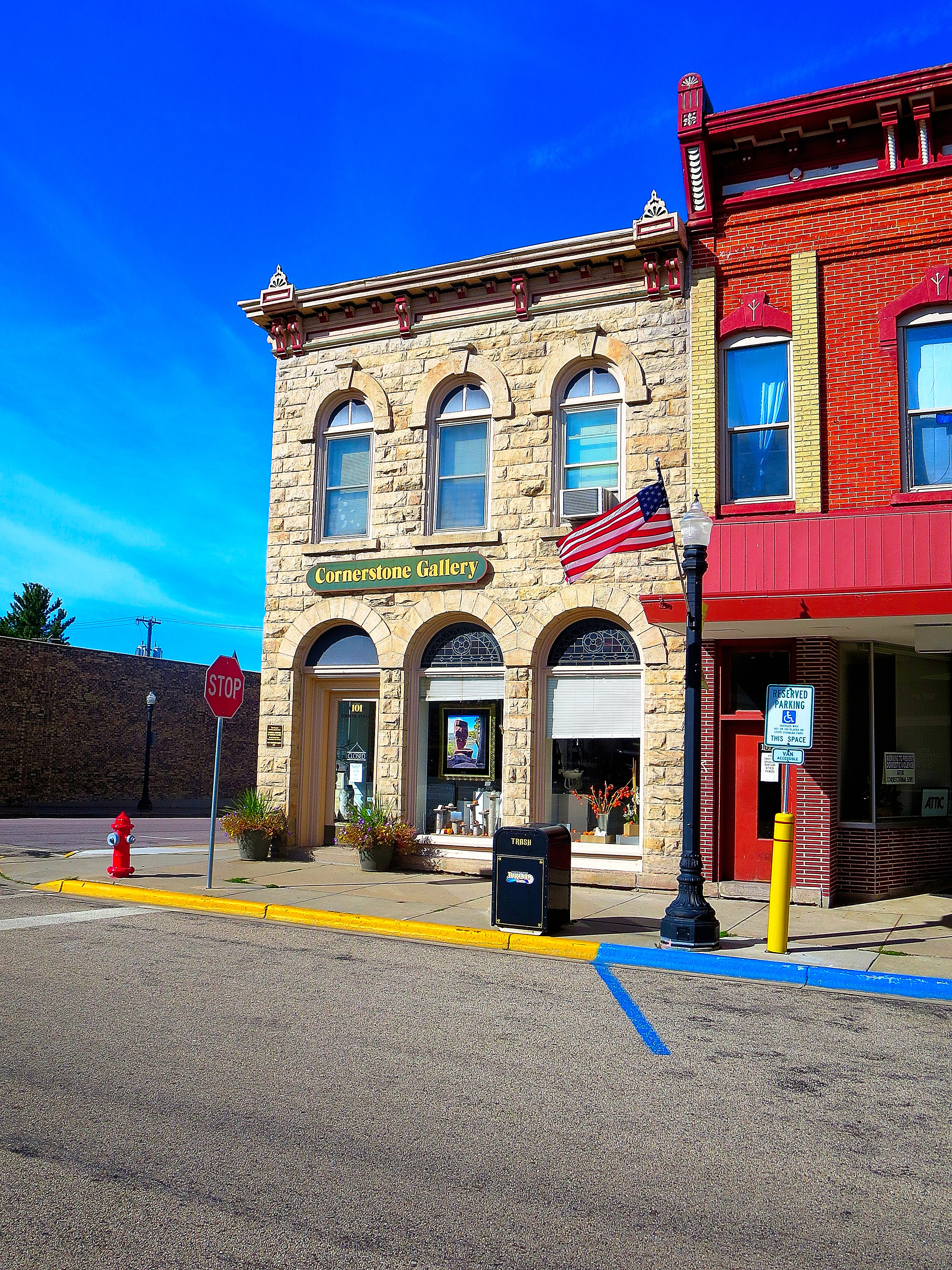
- Gust Brothers' Store

- Location within Wisconsin Location within the United States
- Location: 101 Fourth St. Baraboo, Wisconsin
- Coordinates: 43.47107°N 89.74236°W
- Area: less than one acre
- Built: 1877
- Architectural style: Italianate
- NRHP reference No.: 02000834
- Added to NRHP: August 5, 2002

The Gust Brothers' Store is located in Baraboo, Wisconsin. It was added to the National Register of Historic Places in 2002.

It is a fine example of an Italianate commercial style building, built in 1877–78 by August and William Gust for their meat market store. It is a two-story 22 by 51 feet (6.7 m × 15.5 m) grayish limestone building. It has also been known as the Baraboo Savings Bank and as the Farmers' and Merchants' Bank, two banks which it later housed.
