= Sauk County Courthouse =

- U.S. National Register of Historic Places
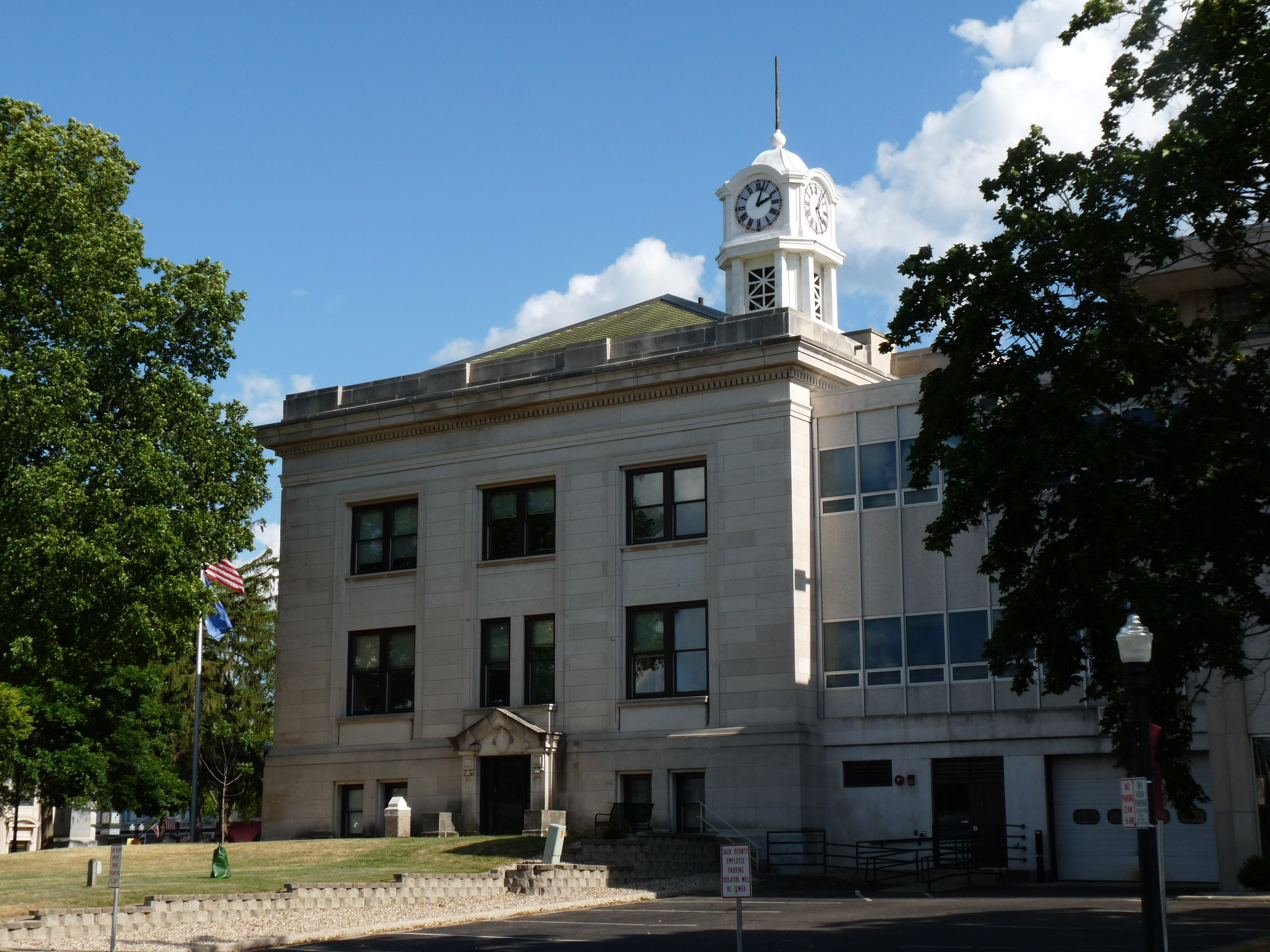

- Location within Wisconsin Location within the United States
- Interactive map showing the location for Sauk County Courthouse
- Location: 515 Oak St., Baraboo, Wisconsin
- Coordinates: 43°28′13″N 89°44′35″W
- Area: 1.5 acres (0.61 ha)
- Built: 1906
- Architect: Ferry & Clas
- Architectural style: Neoclassical
- MPS: County Courthouses of Wisconsin TR
- NRHP reference No.: 82000711
- Added to NRHP: March 9, 1982

The Sauk County Courthouse, located at 515 Oak Street in Baraboo, is the county courthouse serving Sauk County, Wisconsin. Built in 1906, the courthouse is Sauk County's fourth and its third in Baraboo. Wisconsin architecture firm Ferry & Clas designed the Neoclassical building. The courthouse is listed on the National Register of Historic Places.

== History ==
Sauk County's first courthouse was built in Prairie du Sac in 1844; however, the county seat moved to Baraboo two years later, and after a challenge from Reedsburg an 1852 referendum kept it there. The first courthouse in Baraboo was completed in 1848, on the present-day courthouse square; the two-story building also hosted classes, dances, and church services in its courtroom. The 1848 courthouse burned down in the 1850s, and the county constructed a new brick courthouse at the same site. The new courthouse ultimately burned down as well, in December 1904; however, the county had voted to replace it a month before the fire. Its replacement, the current courthouse, was completed in 1906.

The courthouse's tower was renovated in 1915 to add bells. The building was placed on the National Register of Historic Places on March 9, 1982. The county expanded it in 1989 and renovated it in 1996.

== Architecture ==
Milwaukee-based architecture firm Ferry & Clas designed the Neoclassical courthouse. The two-story building is built of Indiana limestone. The front entrance is flanked by two-story Ionic pilasters; the door is topped by a pediment, and long windows on the second floor complete the entrance. An entablature and projecting cornice, separated by dentillation, run along the building's roof line. The courthouse's terra cotta hip roof is topped by a clock tower, which was originally a cupola before its renovation. While much of the interior has been renovated, the courthouse's marble staircase hall and barrel vaulted corridors are original; the former features decorative capitals and egg-and-dart moldings.
