= Baraboo station =

Historic railway station in Wisconsin, U.S.

Baraboo
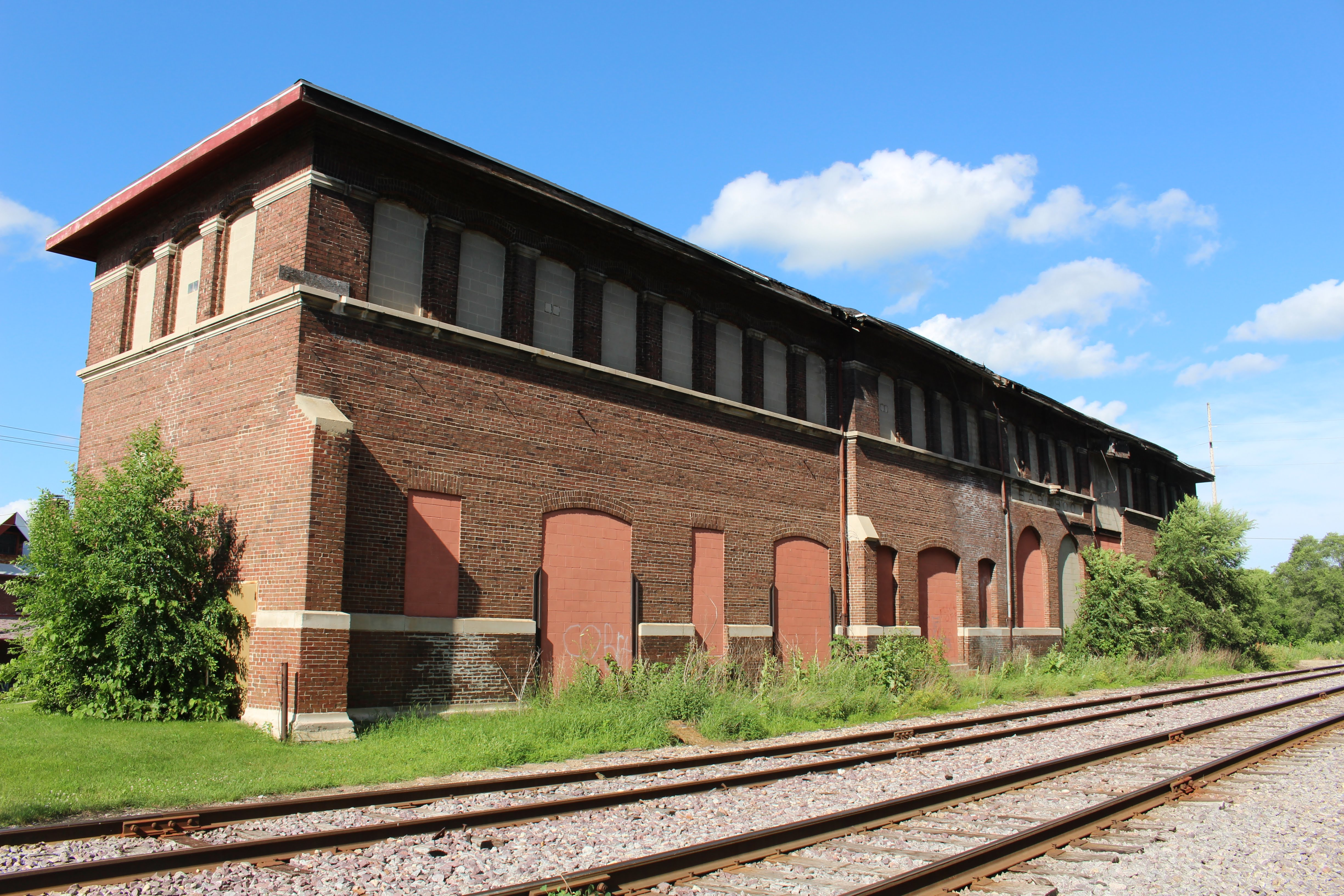
- The Baraboo depot in 2018

General information
- Location: 220 Lynn St., Baraboo, Wisconsin
- Coordinates: 43°27′55″N 89°44′31″W
- System: Former Chicago and North Western Railway station
- Line: Reedsburg Subdivision

Construction
- Structure type: At-grade
- Architect: Frost & Granger
- Architectural style: Romanesque Revival

History
- Opened: 1902
- Closed: 1963

Services
Preceding station	Chicago and North Western Railway	Following station
North Freedom toward Minneapolis	Chicago – Minneapolis via Madison	Devil's Lake toward Chicago
- Baraboo Chicago & North Western Depot and Division Offices
- U.S. National Register of Historic Places
- Location within Wisconsin
- Location: 220 Lynn St., Baraboo, Wisconsin
- Coordinates: 43°27′55″N 89°44′31″W
- Area: less than one acre
- Built: 1902
- Architect: Frost & Granger
- Architectural style: Romanesque Revival
- NRHP reference No.: 100007642
- Added to NRHP: April 25, 2022
Location

Baraboo station is a former railway station in Baraboo, Wisconsin, built be the Chicago and North Western Railway (C&NW). The depot served both passengers and freight traffic as well as housing the Madison Division offices of the C&NW. The Madison Division covered a 219-mile (352 km) line from Belvidere, Illinois to Medary, Wisconsin. The depot was designed by the team of Frost and Granger, who designed more than 200 depots for the C&NW. This particular depot was built in the Romanesque Revival style. Passenger service to the depot ended in 1963 with the elimination of the Rochester 400. As of 2022, the Sauk County Historical Society hopes to restore the depot into a museum and community gathering space.

The building was listed on the National Register of Historic Places on April 25, 2022 as Baraboo Chicago & North Western Depot and Division Offices.
