= Al. Ringling Theatre =

Performance center in Baraboo, Wisconsin

- Al Ringling Theatre
- U.S. National Register of Historic Places
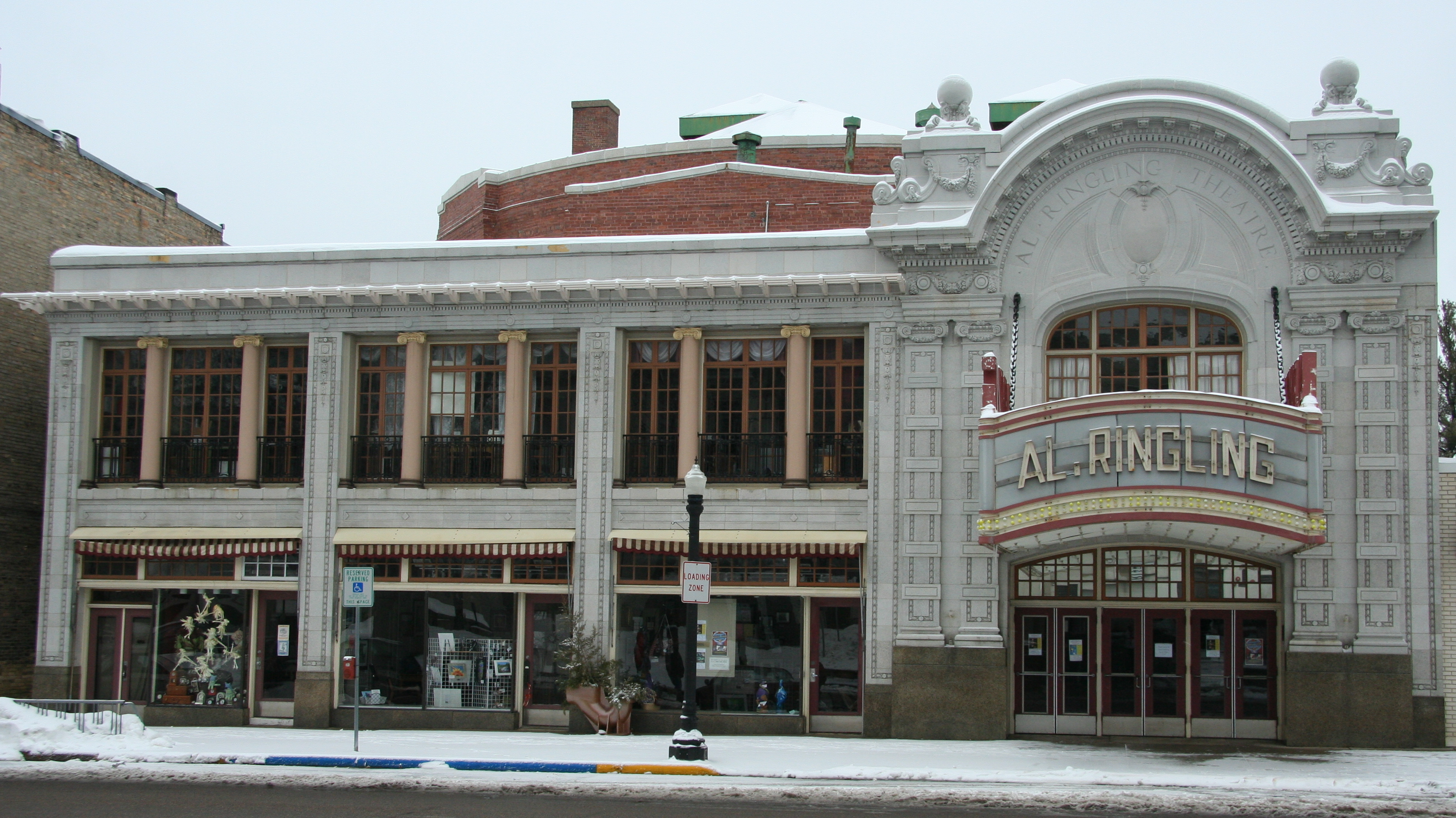
- The Al. Ringling Theatre

- Location within Wisconsin Location within the United States
- Location: 136 4th Ave., Baraboo, Wisconsin
- Coordinates: 43°28′16″N 89°44′37″W
- Built: 1915
- Architect: C.W. Rapp, George L. Rapp
- Architectural style: Beaux Arts
- NRHP reference No.: 76000202
- Added to NRHP: May 17, 1976

The Al. Ringling Theatre is a performance center located in Baraboo, Wisconsin, United States. It opened its doors in November 1915 and has been operating continuously ever since. Designed by the architectural firm Rapp and Rapp, it was commissioned by Albert Ringling, one of the circus Ringling Brothers, for $100,000. Over the years, it has featured performances from vaudeville and silent movies to grand opera starring such notables as Lionel Barrymore and Mary Pickford.

== Design ==
The design of the Theatre is based on the Orpheum Theatre, built by Rapp and Rapp in Champaign, Illinois in 1914. The decor of the auditorium is said to have derived from Ange-Jacques Gabriel's opera house of 1763-1770 in the Palace of Versailles but some believe it to be at least equally based on Victor Louis's 1780 Grand Théâtre de Bordeaux. As of May 2024, the Theatre's capacity is 710 seats.

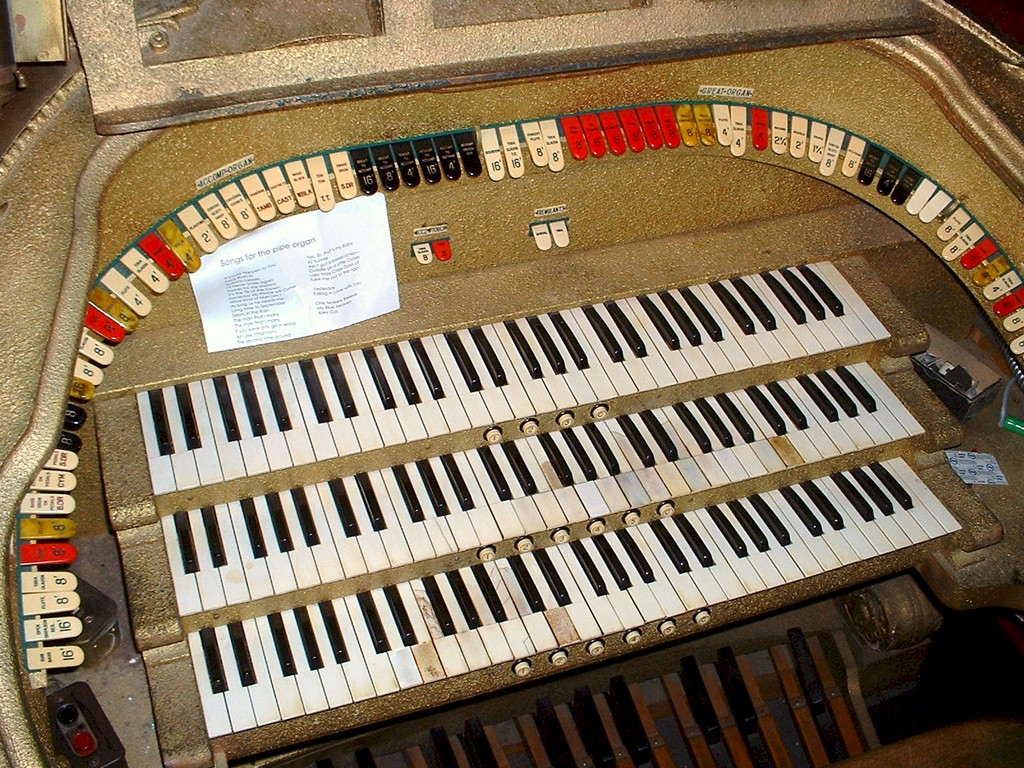
The Al. Ringling's Barton theater pipe organ console

== Features ==
Originally the Theatre had a Style 1 Wurlitzer theater pipe organ. Later a 9 rank, 3 manual Barton with a "circus wagon" style console replaced the Wurlitzer. As of early 2025, the Theatre is undergoing a $1 million renovation that includes the installation of an automated stage rigging system.

== In media ==
The Al Ringling Theater was featured in an episode of PBS's History Detectives, where they investigated whether it was the country's first great movie palace.
