= Skillet Creek =

Stream in Sauk County, Wisconsin, U.S.

Coordinates: 43°27′23″N 89°47′56″W

Skillet Creek is a stream in Sauk County, Wisconsin, in the United States.

Skillet Creek was named from rock formations which resembled a cast-iron skillet.

== See also ==
- Fryingpan River
- List of rivers of Wisconsin
