= Ringling Brothers Circus =

Traveling circus company (1884–1919)

Ringling Bros. World's Greatest Shows
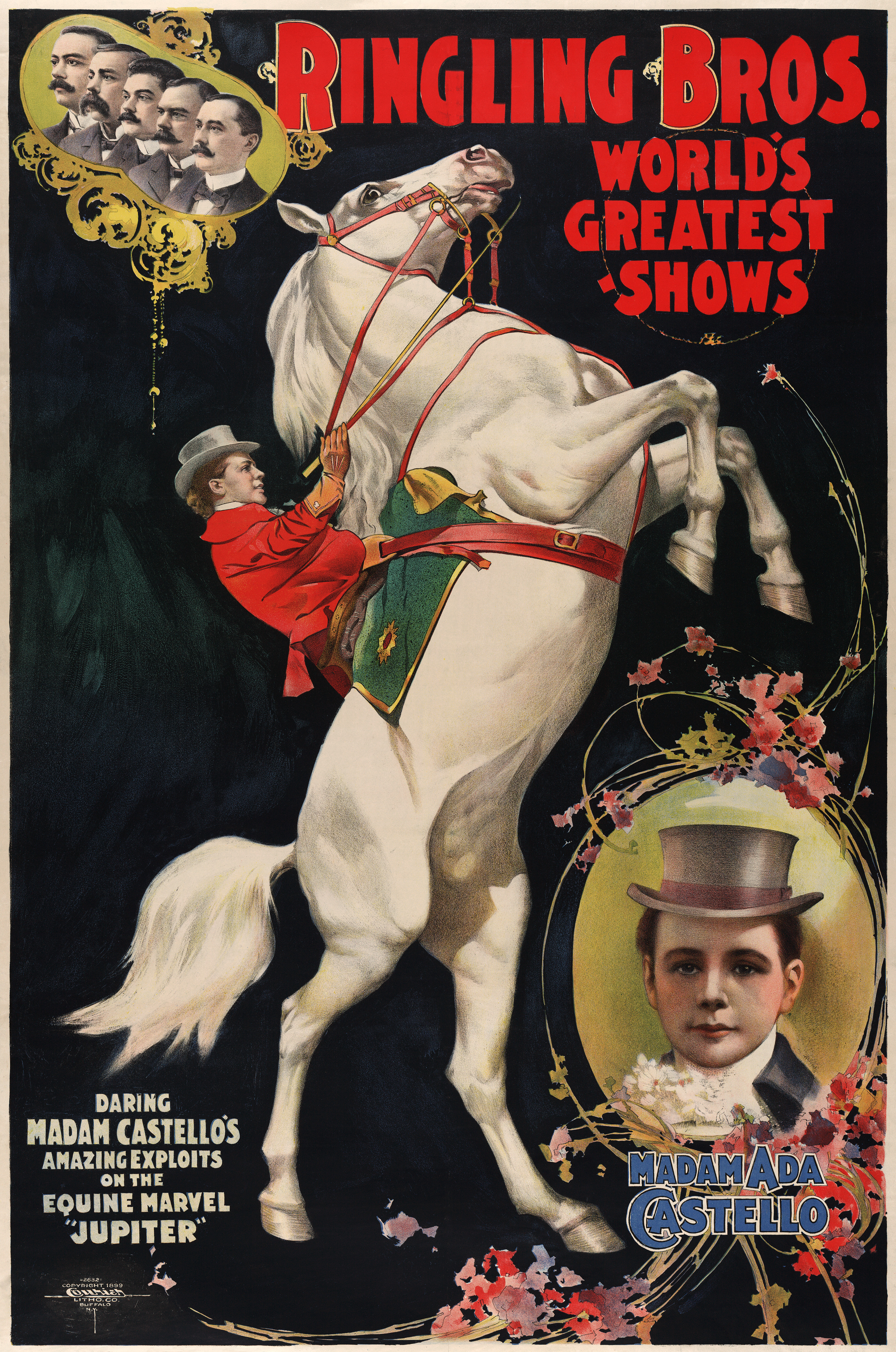
- Poster for Ringling Bros. World's Greatest Shows, ca. 1899; The Ringling brothers are depicted in the upper left corner

Origin
- Country: United States
- Founder(s): Five of the Ringling brothers
- Year founded: 1884; 141 years ago

Information
- Operator(s): Ringling Bros.
- Fate: Merged with Barnum & Bailey's Greatest Show on Earth in 1919, as Ringling Bros. and Barnum & Bailey Circus
- Traveling show?: Yes
- Circus tent?: Yes
- Website: https://www.ringling.com

Ringling Bros. World's Greatest Shows is a circus founded in Baraboo, Wisconsin, United States in 1884 by five of the seven Ringling brothers: Albert, August, Otto, Alfred T., Charles, John, and Henry. The Ringling brothers were sons of a German immigrant, August Frederick Rüngeling, who changed his name to Ringling once he settled in America. Four brothers were born in McGregor, Iowa: Alf T., Charles, John and Henry. The Ringling family lived in McGregor, Iowa, for twelve years, from 1860 until 1872. The family then lived in Prairie du Chien, Wisconsin, and moved to Baraboo, Wisconsin, in 1875.

In 1907 Ringling Bros. acquired the Barnum & Bailey Circus, merging them in 1919 to become Ringling Bros. and Barnum & Bailey Circus, promoted as The Greatest Show on Earth. Ringling Bros. and Barnum & Bailey closed on May 21, 2017, following weakening attendance and high operating costs.

After a six-year hiatus a newly designed production was launched in Bossier City, Louisiana September 28, 2023. The two-year tour was booked into 50 cities, but without any animals.

== History ==
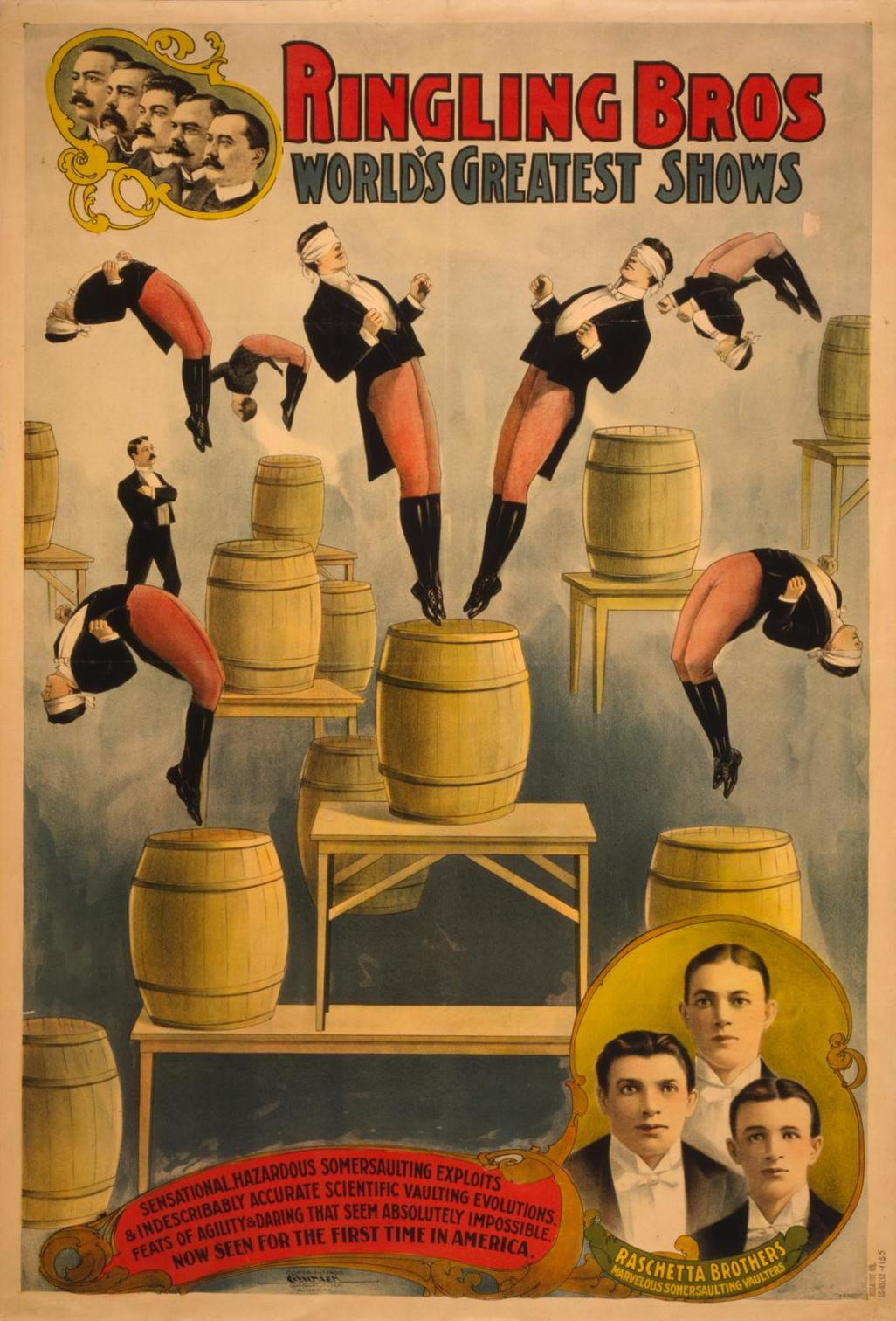
Poster promoting the "Raschetta Brothers" acrobats

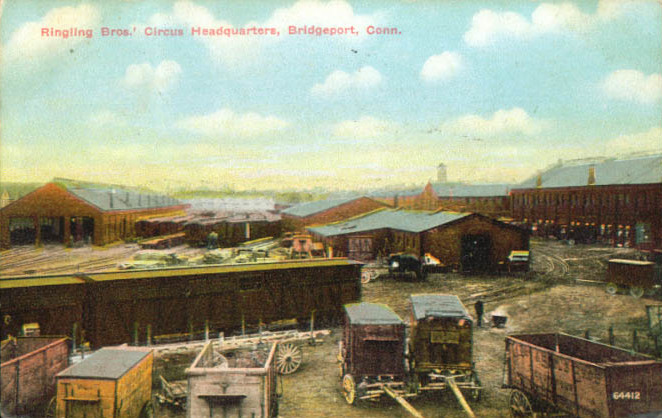
Circus's Bridgeport, Connecticut, headquarters, about 1911

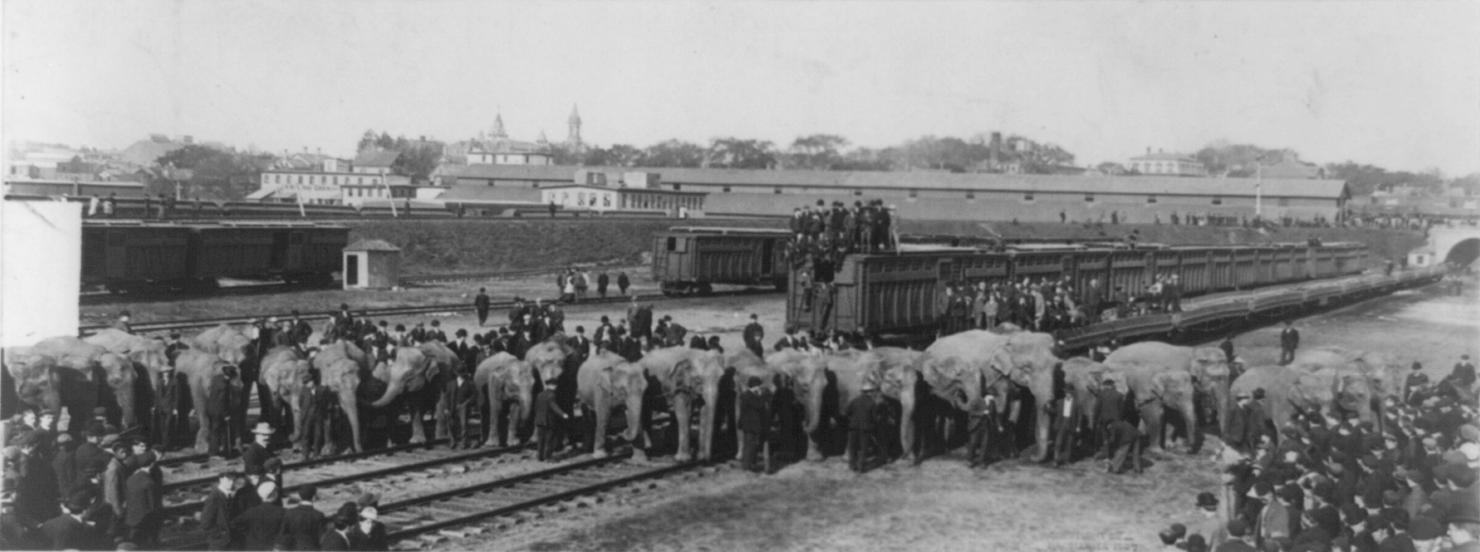
Ringling Brothers trains and elephants

In 1882, before the Ringling brothers created their first circus, the five brothers performed skits and juggling routines in town halls around the state of Wisconsin. Their first show was on November 27, 1882, in Mazomanie, Wisconsin. They called this the "Ringling Bros. Variety Performance" when they took the show to the next town. With two wandering performers the next year, the brothers toured the Northwest. After the Northwest tour, they used the money earned for suits.

They expanded their acts into a one ring show in 1884. The show added a trick horse and a bear at the end of the season. The circus started traveling by trains in 1888 allowing the show to consistently expand.

The Ringlings acquired the Yankee Robinson Circus and opened a joint show on May 19, 1884. This brought them to the attention of James Anthony Bailey of Barnum & Bailey. The brothers later met with Bailey and agreed to divide some territory. This was followed by the purchase of a half share of the Adam Forepaugh Sells Brothers Circus from Bailey. Bailey, under the area division, prohibited the Ringlings from playing at Madison Square Garden, a location it was the brothers' ambition to perform at. In 1887 Ringling Circus changed its official title to the "Ringling Bros. United Monster Shows, Great Double Circus, Royal European Menagerie, Museum, Caravan, and Congress of Trained Animals."

In 1906, Bailey died, which led to the Ringlings taking over Forepaugh–Sells, which continued to operate separately. In October 1907, the stockholders of Barnum and Bailey Ltd. approved the sale of the circus to the Ringlings. Due to declining audiences, the Spanish flu pandemic and the World War I manpower shortage, the Barnum and Bailey and Ringling circuses were merged in 1919 as Ringling Bros. and Barnum & Bailey Circus.
