= Wisconsin Highway 33 =

State highway in Wisconsin, United States

State Trunk Highway 33
- 84th Division "Railsplitters" Memorial Highway
- WIS 33 highlighted in red

Route information
- Maintained by WisDOT
- Length: 200.84 mi (323.22 km)

Major junctions
- West end: US 14 / US 61 in La Crosse
- US 12 / WIS 136 in Baraboo; I-90 / I-94 in Portage; I-39 in Portage; US 51 / WIS 16 in Portage; US 151 in Beaver Dam; I-41 / US 41 in Allenton; US 45 in West Bend; I-43 / WIS 57 in Saukville
- East end: WIS 32 / LMCT in Port Washington

Location
- Country: United States
- State: Wisconsin
- Counties: La Crosse, Monroe, Vernon, Juneau, Sauk, Columbia, Dodge, Washington, Ozaukee

Highway system
- Wisconsin State Trunk Highway System; Interstate; US; State; Scenic; Rustic
← WIS 32	→ WIS 34

State Trunk Highway 33 (often called Highway 33, STH-33 or WIS 33) is a Wisconsin state highway running east–west across central Wisconsin. It is 200.84 miles (323.22 km) in length.

== Route description ==
=== La Crosse to Baraboo ===
WIS 33 begins 300 feet (91 m) east of the Mississippi River where it intersects U.S. Highway 14 (US 14) and US 61 just south of downtown La Crosse. Traveling east, it intersects with WIS 35. Leaving La Crosse, WIS 33 meanders eastward. It runs concurrently with WIS 162 from Newberg Corners to Middle Ridge. Further east, WIS 33 intersects WIS 27 in Cashton. Then, it briefly runs concurrently with WIS 131 in Ontario, then briefly meanders south through the Wildcat Mountain State Park, and then meanders back east. Even further east, WIS 33 runs concurrently with WIS 82 west of Hillsboro and then WIS 80 in Hillsboro. Both routes branch off together north from WIS 33 in Union Center. In La Valle, WIS 58 briefly runs concurrently with WIS 33. In Reedsburg, WIS 23 begins to travel east via WIS 33. Just east of Reedsburg, WIS 136 intersects and ends at a concurrency. Further east, WIS 23 branches off from WIS 33. Just north of West Baraboo, WIS 33 joins US 12 southward at a dumbbell interchange. In West Baraboo, WIS 33 leaves US 12 at another dumbbell interchange and briefly runs concurrently with WIS 136. As WIS 136 leaves southward at a four-way intersection, Business US 12 joins in from the north. In Baraboo, Bus. US 12 branches off southward where WIS 113 ends.

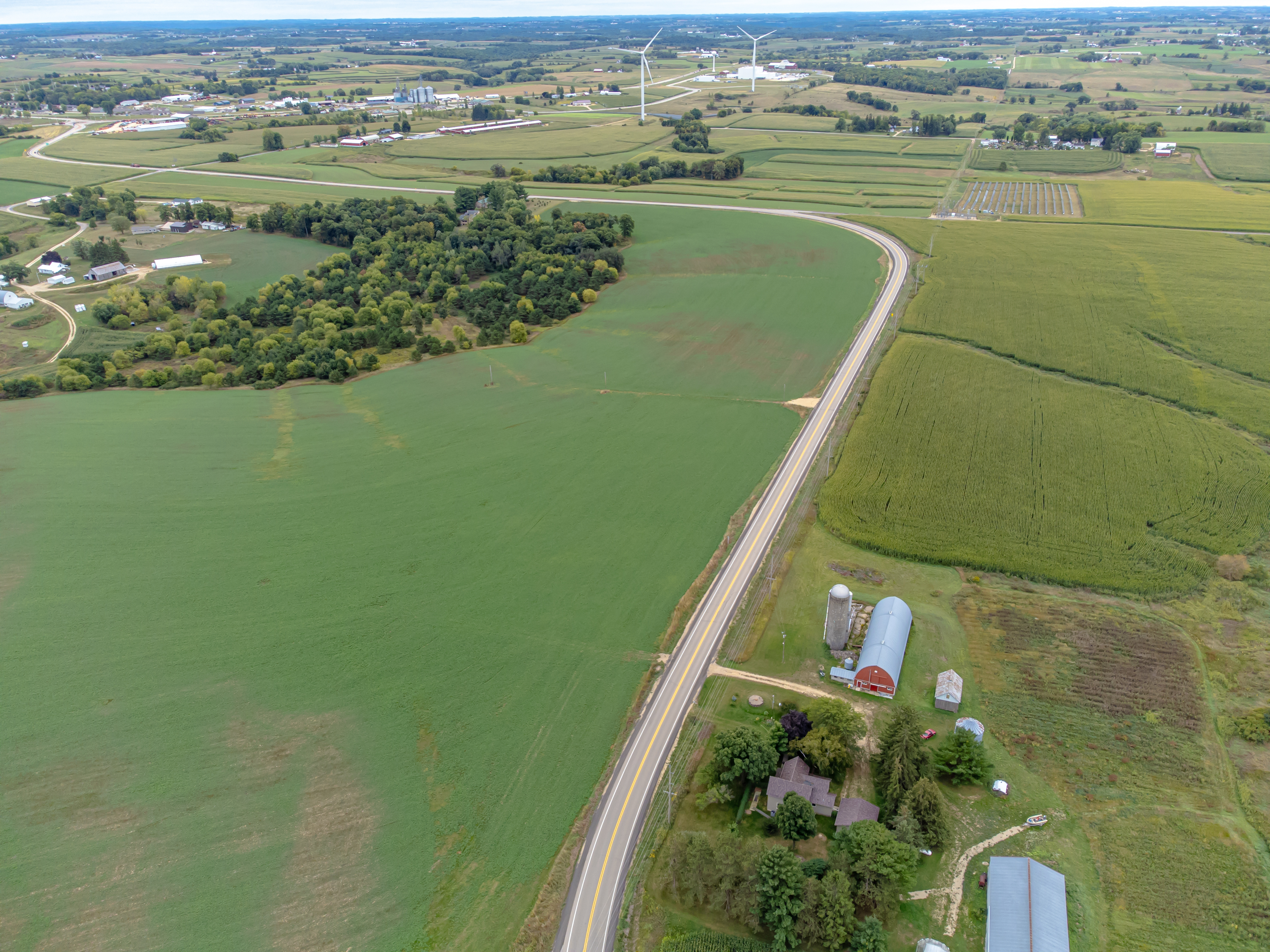
WIS 33 near Cashton

=== Baraboo to Port Washington ===
As WIS 33 continues eastward, it then meets I-90/I-94 at a parclo north of the Cascade Mountain ski resort. Another parclo is present just east of I-90/I-94. This time, it meets I-39. For a brief distance, WIS 33 turns north. As soon as it crosses the Wisconsin River, it then turns back east. As it enters downtown Portage, it meets US 51 at a one-way pair and WIS 16 at the western part of the one-way pair. North of Pardeeville, WIS 33 meets WIS 22. Further east, it then briefly runs concurrently with WIS 44 in Marcellon. Even further east, it then meets WIS 146 north of Cambria, WIS 73 north of Randolph, and WIS 68 in Fox Lake. As it intersects at an intersection where WIS 68 ends, WIS 33 turns south. In Beaver Dam, WIS 33 turns east, briefly following Business US 151. It then meets US 151 at a diamond interchange. At Minnesota Junction, WIS 33 intersects WIS 26. Continuing east, it intersects WIS 28 in Horicon, WIS 67 north of Neda, WIS 175 in Addison, and I-41/US 41 at a diamond interchange in Allenton. Between Nabob and West Bend, WIS 144 follows WIS 33. While they run concurrently with each other, they meet US 45 at another diamond interchange. In Saukville, WIS 33 meets I-43/WIS 57 at a diamond interchange once again. Continuing east, it ends in downtown Port Washington at WIS 32 one mile (1.6 km) west of Lake Michigan.

== History ==
Prior to European settlement, the foot trail from Port Washington to Horicon was the most traveled of seven trails that met in Horicon Marsh. A road was constructed to provide access from Lake Michigan to the fertile hunting grounds of the marsh, to provide food for the crews of ships on the lake.

Starting in 1918, WIS 33 used to travel from WIS 12 in Baraboo to Camp Douglas via parts of present-day WIS 136, WIS 33, the WIS 80/WIS 82 concurrency, WIS 80 alone, and CTH-H. In 1919, WIS 33 had undergone changes. As of 1919, it switched its service from Camp Douglas to La Crosse. The portion of the route from Union Center to Camp Douglas became WIS 94. Also, it extended eastward from Baraboo to Waupun via present-day WIS 33 and WIS 68. In 1929, WIS 33 (which served Waupun) and WIS 68 (which served Port Washington) swapped routes.

== Major intersections ==
County	Location	mi	km	Destinations	Notes
La Crosse	La Crosse	0.0	0.0	US 14 east / US 61 south (3rd Street) – Coon Valley, Madison	Western terminus of WIS 33; one-way road
La Crosse	La Crosse	0.0	0.0	US 14 west / US 61 north (4th Street) – La Crescent	One-way road
La Crosse	La Crosse	0.7	1.1	WIS 35 (West Avenue) – Onalaska, Stoddard	
La Crosse	Newberg Corners	14.6	23.5	WIS 162 south – Coon Valley	Western end of WIS 162 concurrency
La Crosse	Middle Ridge	17.7	28.5	WIS 162 north / CTH-G south – Bangor	Eastern end of WIS 162 concurrency
Monroe	Cashton	28.1	45.2	WIS 27 – Melvina, Westby	
Vernon	Ontario	39.0	62.8	WIS 131 south (Garden Street) – La Farge	Western end of WIS 131 concurrency
Vernon	Ontario	39.1	62.9	WIS 131 north – Wilton	Eastern end of WIS 131 concurrency
Vernon		52.1	83.8	WIS 82 west – La Farge	Western end of WIS 82 concurrency
Vernon	Hillsboro	55.0	88.5	WIS 80 south – Richland Center	Western end of WIS 80 concurrency
Juneau	Union Center	59.6	95.9	WIS 80 north / WIS 82 east – Elroy	Eastern end of WIS 80/WIS 82 concurrency
Sauk		70.3	113.1	WIS 58 north – Mauston	Western end of WIS 58 concurrency
Sauk	La Valle	71.3	114.7	WIS 58 south – The 400 State Trail	Eastern end of WIS 58 concurrency
Sauk	Reedsburg	78.3	126.0	WIS 23 south (Albert Avenue)	Western end of WIS 23 concurrency
Sauk		81.4	131.0	WIS 136 east – Rock Springs	Western terminus of WIS 136
Sauk		84.6	136.2	WIS 23 north – Lake Delton, Wisconsin Dells	Eastern end of WIS 23 concurrency
Sauk		90.2	145.2	US 12 west to Bus. US 12 – Wisconsin Dells, Baraboo–Wisconsin Dells Airport	Western end of US 12 concurrency
Sauk	West Baraboo	92.9	149.5	US 12 east / WIS 136 west – Rock Springs, Madison	Eastern end of US 12 concurrency; western end of WIS 136 concurrency
Sauk	West Baraboo	93.4	150.3	WIS 136 east / Bus. US 12 west / CTH-BD north (Pine Street)	Eastern end of WIS 136 concurrency; western end of Bus. US 12 concurrency
Sauk	Baraboo	94.6	152.2	Bus. US 12 east / WIS 113 south (Broadway)	Eastern end of Bus. US 12 concurrency; northern terminus of WIS 113
Columbia		107.4	172.8	I-90 / I-94 – Madison, Wisconsin Dells	
Columbia	Portage	109.3	175.9	I-39 – Merrimac, Stevens Point	
Columbia	Portage	111.3	179.1	US 51 south / WIS 16 (Wisconsin Street)	
Columbia	Portage	111.4	179.3	US 51 north (DeWitt Street)	
Columbia		119.8	192.8	WIS 22 – Montello, Pardeeville	
Columbia	Marcellon	121.8	196.0	WIS 44 south – Pardeeville	Western end of WIS 44 concurrency
Columbia		122.8	197.6	WIS 44 north – Ripon	Eastern end of WIS 44 concurrency
Columbia		130.1	209.4	WIS 146 south / CTH-M north – Cambria	Northern terminus of WIS 146
Columbia–Dodge county line		135.2	217.6	WIS 73 – Wautoma, Randolph	
Dodge	Fox Lake	140.4	226.0	WIS 68 east	Western terminus of WIS 68
Dodge	Beaver Dam	149.4	240.4	Bus. US 151 south (Front Street)	Western end of Bus. US 151 concurrency
Dodge	Beaver Dam	149.5	240.6	Bus. US 151 north (Spring Street)	Eastern end of Bus. US 151 concurrency
Dodge	Beaver Dam	150.5	242.2	US 151 – Madison, Fond du Lac	Interchange
Dodge	Minnesota Junction	156.7	252.2	WIS 26 – Juneau, Waupun	
Dodge	Horicon	160.7	258.6	WIS 28 east (Clason Street) – Mayville	
Dodge		164.9	265.4	WIS 67 – Mayville, Iron Ridge	
Washington	Addison	173.7	279.5	WIS 175 – Theresa, Slinger	
Washington	Allenton	175.8	282.9	I-41 / US 41 – Milwaukee, Fond du Lac	
Washington	Nabob	179.6	289.0	WIS 144 south – Slinger	Western end of WIS 144 concurrency
Washington	West Bend	182.2	293.2	US 45 – Milwaukee, Kewaskum	Interchange
Washington	West Bend	183.4	295.2	WIS 144 north (Main Street)	Eastern end of WIS 144 concurrency
Ozaukee	Saukville	197.7	318.2	I-43 / WIS 57 – Milwaukee, Sheboygan	
Ozaukee	Port Washington	200.0	321.9	WIS 32 / LMCT (Spring Street)	Eastern terminus of WIS 33
1.000 mi = 1.609 km; 1.000 km = 0.621 mi: Concurrency terminus
