= Wisconsin Highway 162 =

State highway in Wisconsin

State Trunk Highway 162
- WIS 162 highlighted in red

Route information
- Maintained by WisDOT
- Length: 46.03 mi (74.08 km)

Major junctions
- South end: WIS 35 in Stoddard
- US 14 / US 61 in Coon Valley; I-90 in Bangor
- North end: WIS 71 in Four Corners

Location
- Country: United States
- State: Wisconsin
- Counties: Vernon, La Crosse, Monroe

Highway system
- Wisconsin State Trunk Highway System; Interstate; US; State; Scenic; Rustic
← WIS 161	→ WIS 163

State Trunk Highway 162 (often called Highway 162, STH-162 or WIS 162) is a state highway in the U.S. state of Wisconsin. It runs in north–south in southwest Wisconsin from Stoddard to Four Corners.

== Route description ==
The highway starts at its intersection with WIS 33 and Division Street in Stoddard and runs east along Coon Creek. After a running concurrently with County Trunk Highway K (CTH-K), the highway goes through Chaseburg and continues northeast. The highway runs along a short concurrency with US Highway 14 (US 14) and US 61. This short concurrency is a wrong-way concurrency because WIS 162 and US 61 are signed in opposing directions throughout its length. Just west of Coon Valley, the wrong-way concurrency ends as the highway runs north from it.

After 6.6 miles (10.6 km), the highway runs concurrently with WIS 33, which ends at Middle Ridge. After its intersection with CTH-JB, the highway runs along Dutch Creek. It intersects Interstate 90 (I-90) before entering Bangor. After a short concurrency with CTH-B, the highway runs north from Bangor. It runs concurrently with WIS 16 before following Burns Creek. From the creek's end, the highway continues north until it terminates at WIS 71 in Four Corners.

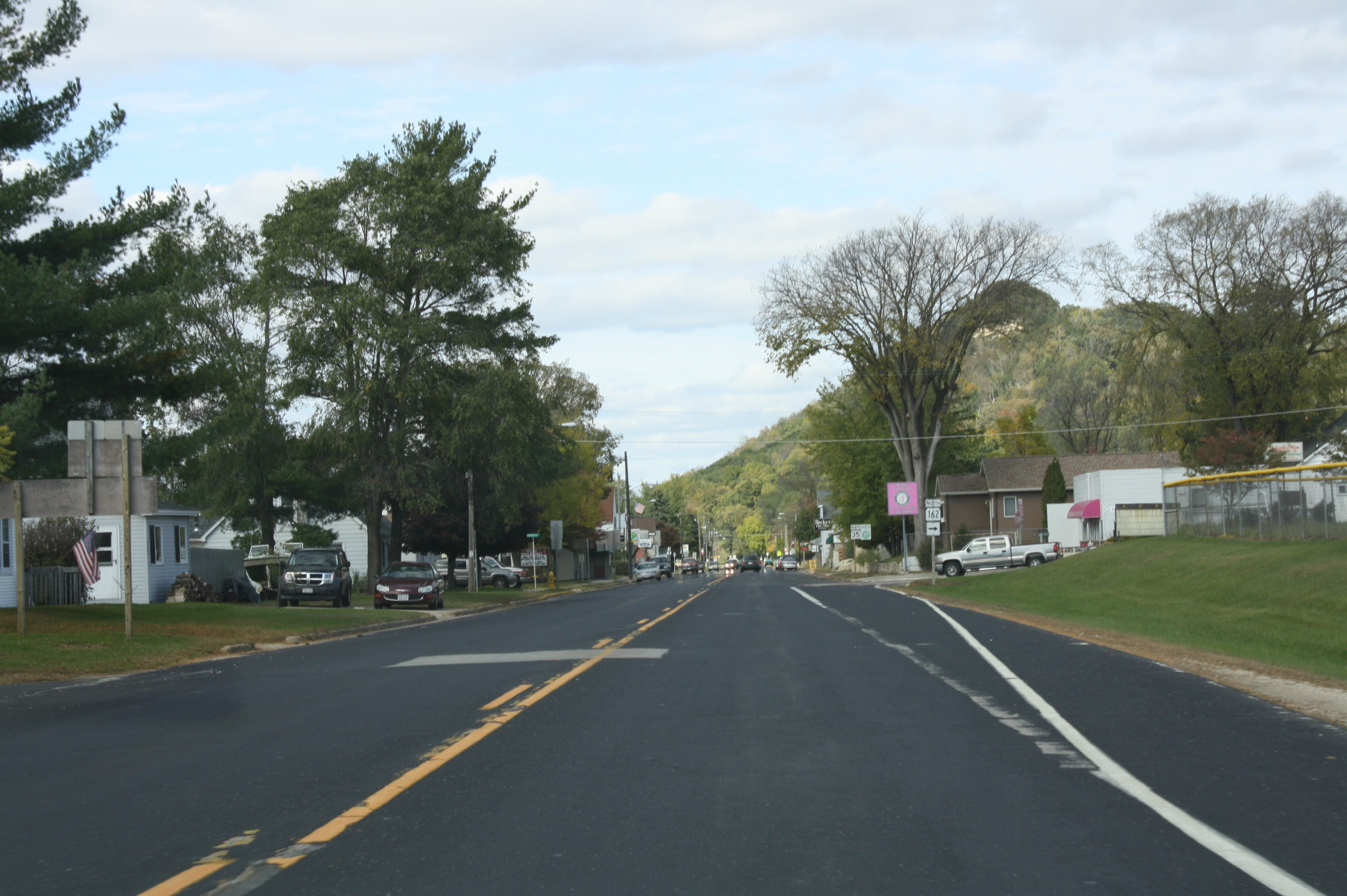
Southwestern terminus

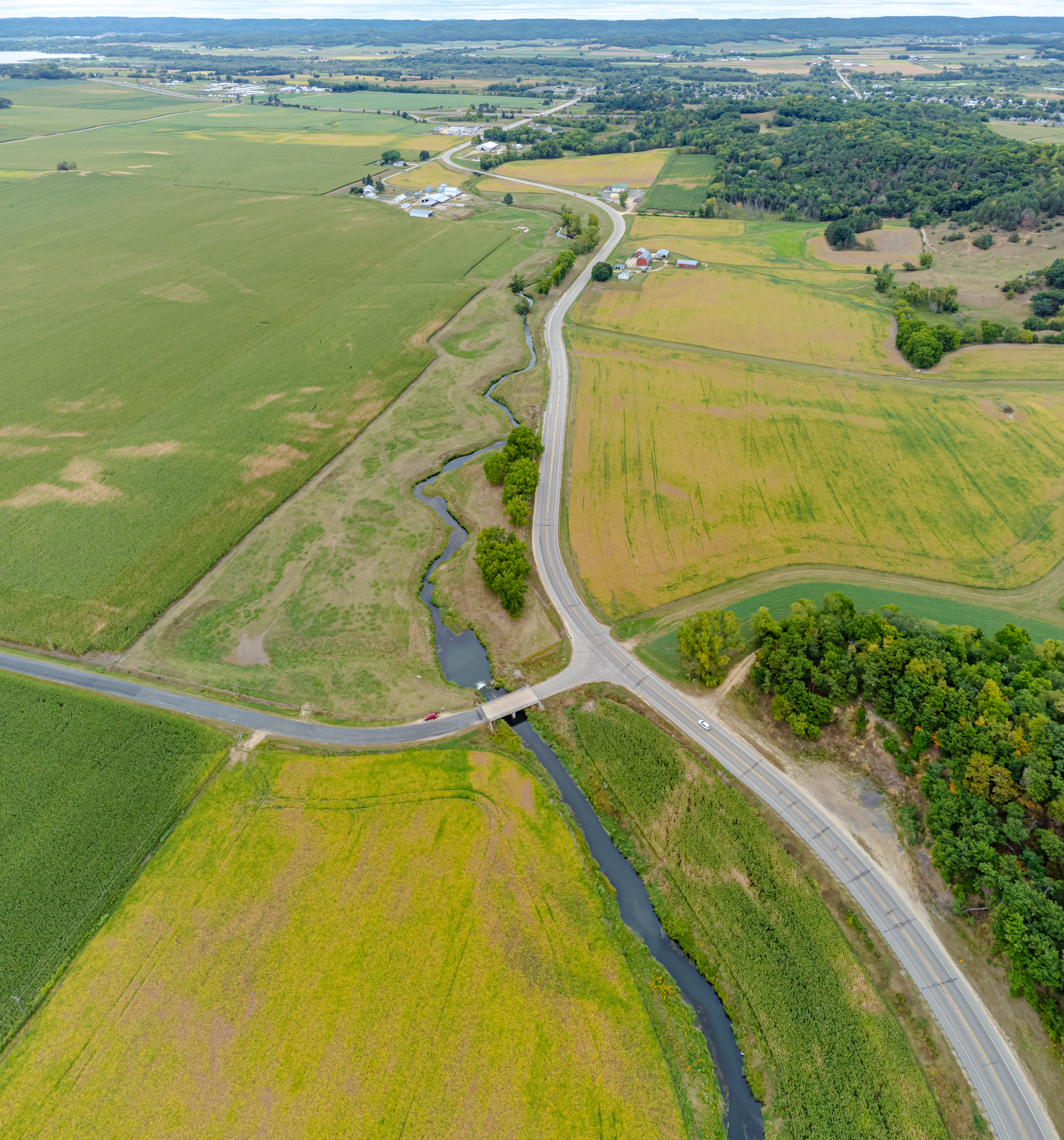
WIS 162 near Bangor and I-90

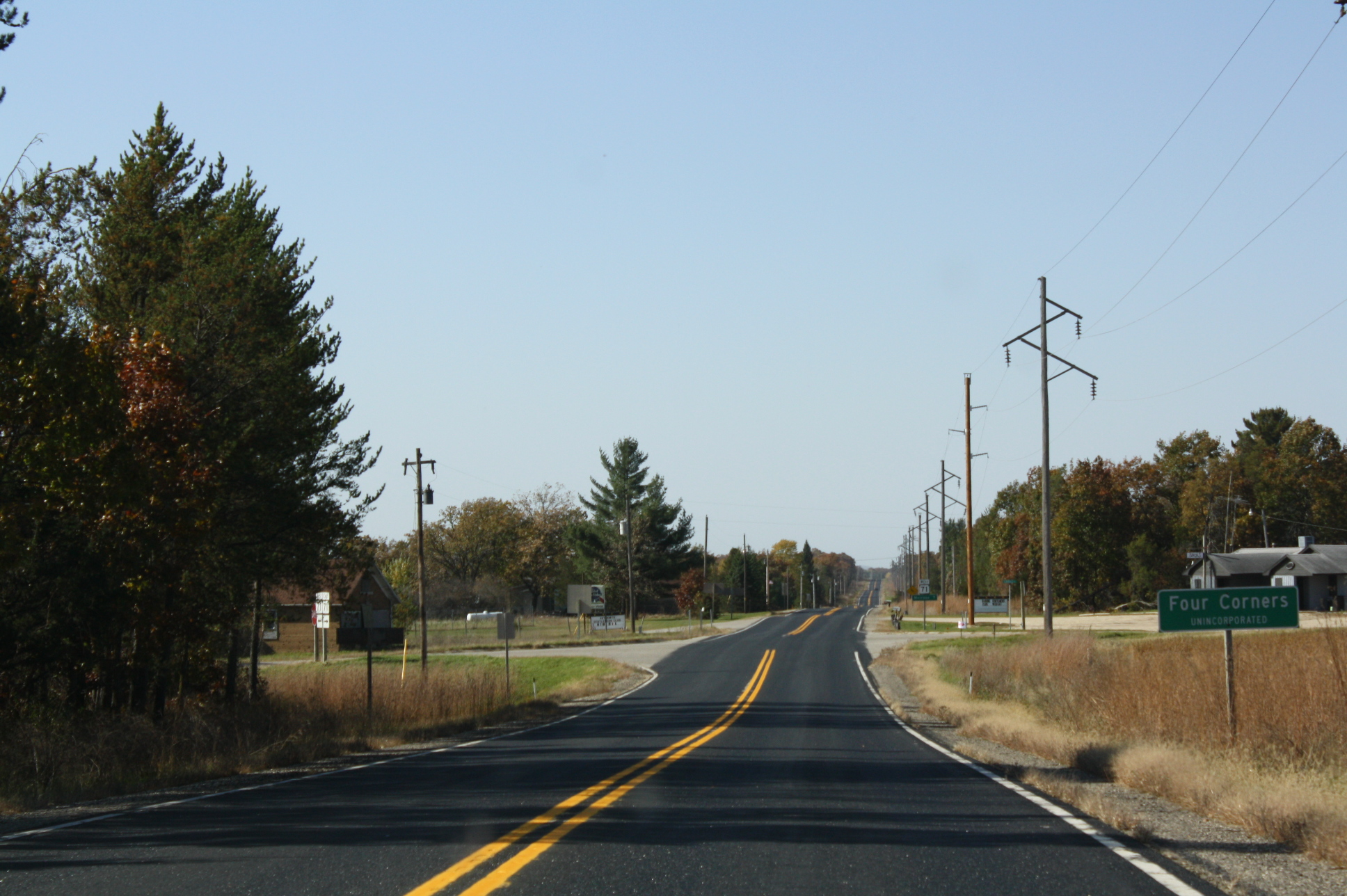
Northern terminus

== Major intersections ==
County	Location	mi	km	Destinations	Notes
Vernon	Stoddard	0.0	0.0	WIS 35 / Great River Road – La Crosse, Genoa	
Vernon	Bergen	0.7	1.1	CTH-O south	
Vernon	Hamburg	6.7	10.8	CTH-K north	Northern end of CTH-K concurrency
Vernon	Chaseburg	7.6	12.2	CTH-K south	Southern end of CTH-K concurrency
Vernon	Hamburg	12.4	20.0	US 14 west / US 61 north – La Crosse	Western end of US 14/US 61 concurrency
Vernon	Coon	13.2	21.2	US 14 east / US 61 south – Westby, Madison	Eastern end of US 14/US 61 concurrency
La Crosse	Washington	19.8	31.9	WIS 33 west – La Crosse	Western end of WIS 33 concurrency
La Crosse	Washington	20.3	32.7	CTH-H east	
La Crosse	Washington	22.8	36.7	WIS 33 east / CTH-G south – Cashton	Eastern end of WIS 33 concurrency
La Crosse	Bangor (town)–Bangor line	29.9	48.1	I-90 – La Crosse, Madison	
La Crosse	Bangor (town)–Bangor line	30.2	48.6	CTH-B west	Western end of CTH-B concurrency
La Crosse	Bangor	30.6	49.2	CTH-B east / CTH-U east	Eastern end of CTH-B concurrency
La Crosse	Burns	32.2	51.8	WIS 16 east – Sparta	Eastern end of WIS 16 concurrency
La Crosse	Burns	32.7	52.6	WIS 16 west – West Salem, La Crosse	Western end of WIS 16 concurrency
La Crosse	Burns	35.3	56.8	CTH-E	
La Crosse	Burns	41.8	67.3	CTH-T west	
La Crosse	Burns	43.2	69.5	CTH-A west	
Monroe	Little Falls	45.4	73.1	WIS 71 – Melrose, Sparta	
1.000 mi = 1.609 km; 1.000 km = 0.621 mi: Concurrency terminus
