= Skumsrud Heritage Farm =

- Nils Skumsrud House
- U.S. National Register of Historic Places
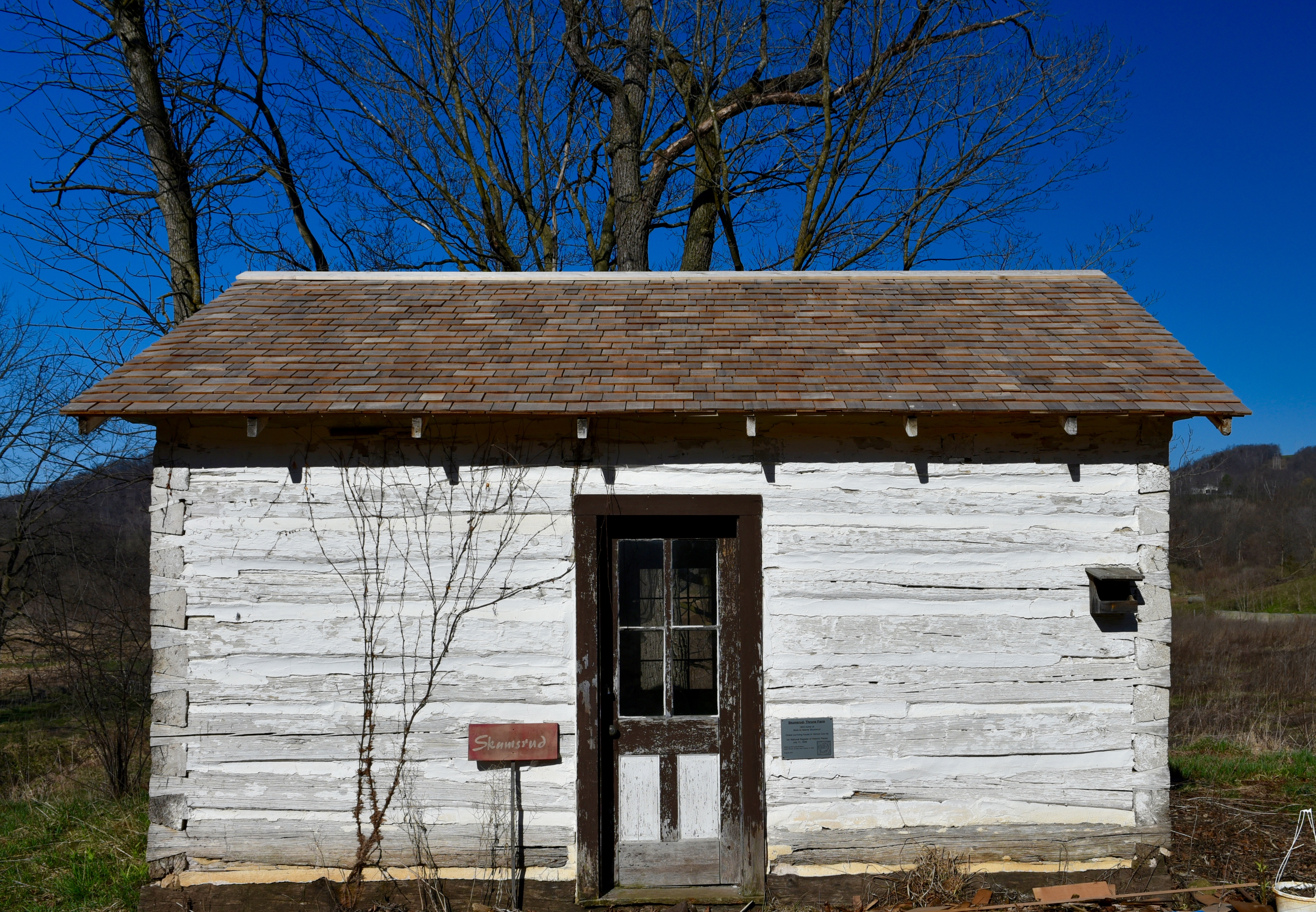

- Location within Wisconsin Location within the United States
- Location: Hamburg, Vernon County, SE of jct. of WI162 & US14/US61; Coon Valley, Wisconsin
- Coordinates: 43°41′48″N 91°2′13″W
- Area: less than one acre
- Built: 1853
- Built by: Skumsrud, Nils
- Architectural style: Single-pen log
- NRHP reference No.: 90000571
- Added to NRHP: July 11, 1990

Skumsrud Heritage Farm is a Norwegian immigrant homestead located 1.5 miles (2.4 km) west of Coon Valley, in Vernon County, Wisconsin, United States.

== Description ==
A historic open-air museum and cultural center, the property sits on 43 acres (170,000 m^{2}) of land situated in a valley with a creek running through it. It has 11 restored Norwegian pioneer log buildings, each of which represents a different architectural floor plan of the immigrant Norwegian pioneers.

== History ==
Skumsrud Heritage Farm was built in 1853 by Nels Skumsrud. It was donated to Norskedalen in 1983 by his grandchildren, Lloyd and Ruth Thrune. The brother and sister wished to see the property preserved and also to see it serve as a means of educating people of the area's Norwegian heritage. The property is considered the oldest surviving house in the area, and was listed on the National Register of Historic Places in 1990.
