= Norskedalen =

Botanical garden in La Crosse and Vernon counties, Wisconsin, United States

Coordinates: 43°44′15.42″N 90°59′20.12″W

Norskedalen Nature & Heritage Center.
- Interactive map of Norskedalen Nature & Heritage Center.
- Location: La Crosse and Vernon counties, Wisconsin
- Website: www.norskedalen.org

Norskedalen Nature and Heritage Center is a non-profit organization dedicated to preserving, interpreting, and sharing the Coulee Region's natural environment and cultural heritage. It is near Coon Valley, in La Crosse, and Vernon counties, Wisconsin, United States.

== History ==
The center began in 1977 as an outdoor laboratory and arboretum when Alf and Carroll Gundersen donated 112 acres (0.45 km^{2}) to the University of Wisconsin–La Crosse Foundation. Since then, Norskedalen has grown to include over 440 acres (1.8 km^{2}), with 9 miles (14 km) of trails, restored pioneer log buildings from Norwegian immigrants of the late 1800s, and museums with exhibits featuring the natural and cultural heritages of the area.

== Site ==
Norskedalen includes two sites. The main site is three miles (5 km) north of Coon Valley, Wisconsin and open year-round. With 398 acres (1.61 km^{2}) within Poplar Coulee of the Town of Washington in La Crosse County, it contains the Bekkum Homestead, a re-creation of a typical pioneer farm at the turn of the century; the Thrune Visitor center with displays of pioneer and Norwegian immigrant artifacts; the Helga Gundersen Arboretum; and the Paulsen Rental Cabin. The Helga Gundersen Arboretum is home to a bronze sculpture, Zerogee II, by sculptor Paul Granlund. The buildings of the Bekkum Homestead are furnished with artifacts of that time period and open for guided tours from May through October.

The other site, Norskedalen Heritage Site, was formerly the Skumsrud Heritage Farm. It is 1/2-mile (0.80 km) west of Coon Valley, Wisconsin. A seasonal open-air museum that contains more than 11 historical buildings, it includes the 1853 Skumsrud Cabin, (listed on the National Register of Historic Places), and the Erickson School, the first schoolhouse of the area. Each building illustrates a slightly different construction style.

== Nature ==
Norskedalen's 440 acres of ever-changing landscape include the Helga Gundersen Arboretum and several nature trails. The arboretum was started in 1960 by Dr. Alf Gundersen and his wife, Carroll with the intent of enhancing the landscape and giving back to the community. The arboretum boasts a variety of ecosystems including wetland, prairie, and woodlands. Native plants, wildlife, The Gundersen Spring, and a handicap-accessible trail draws guests into the natural beauty of the landscape.

Nature trails at Norskedalen include the Troll Trail, the Pine Loop Trail, and the Ophus Farm Trail. They vary between a half mile to one and a half miles. In 2022, they plan to open three new trails, the Strywald Trail, the Prairie Meadow Trail, and the Forest Ridge Trail.

== Programs ==
Norskedalen provides a variety of programs for all ages. Nature programming includes environmental education, programming for groups such as 4-H and the Boy and Girl Scouts, and adult topics such as incorporating nature into our homes or helping pollinators in our yards.

The Civil War series educates students on the Civil War era by sharing the perspectives (including primary sources) of those on all sides of the conflict.

Letters from Anne dives into life in the 1860s to educate students through the eyes of Anne Engum, who was a teen in Coon Valley Wisconsin.

Heritage classes include folk art and skills such as genealogy, wood carving, needle work, and baking as one day courses or multi-day workshops.

== Jennifer Lee Marker Library ==
The Jennifer Lee Marker library was created with the support of George and Connie Marker in 1982, in memory of their daughter. The library is housed in the Thrune Visitors' Center and provides resources on the natural and ethnic history of the area.

== See also ==
- List of botanical gardens and arboretums in Wisconsin

== Other sources ==
- Wisconsin Department of Tourism
- Savor Wisconsin.com
