= Middle Ridge, Wisconsin =

- Unincorporated community
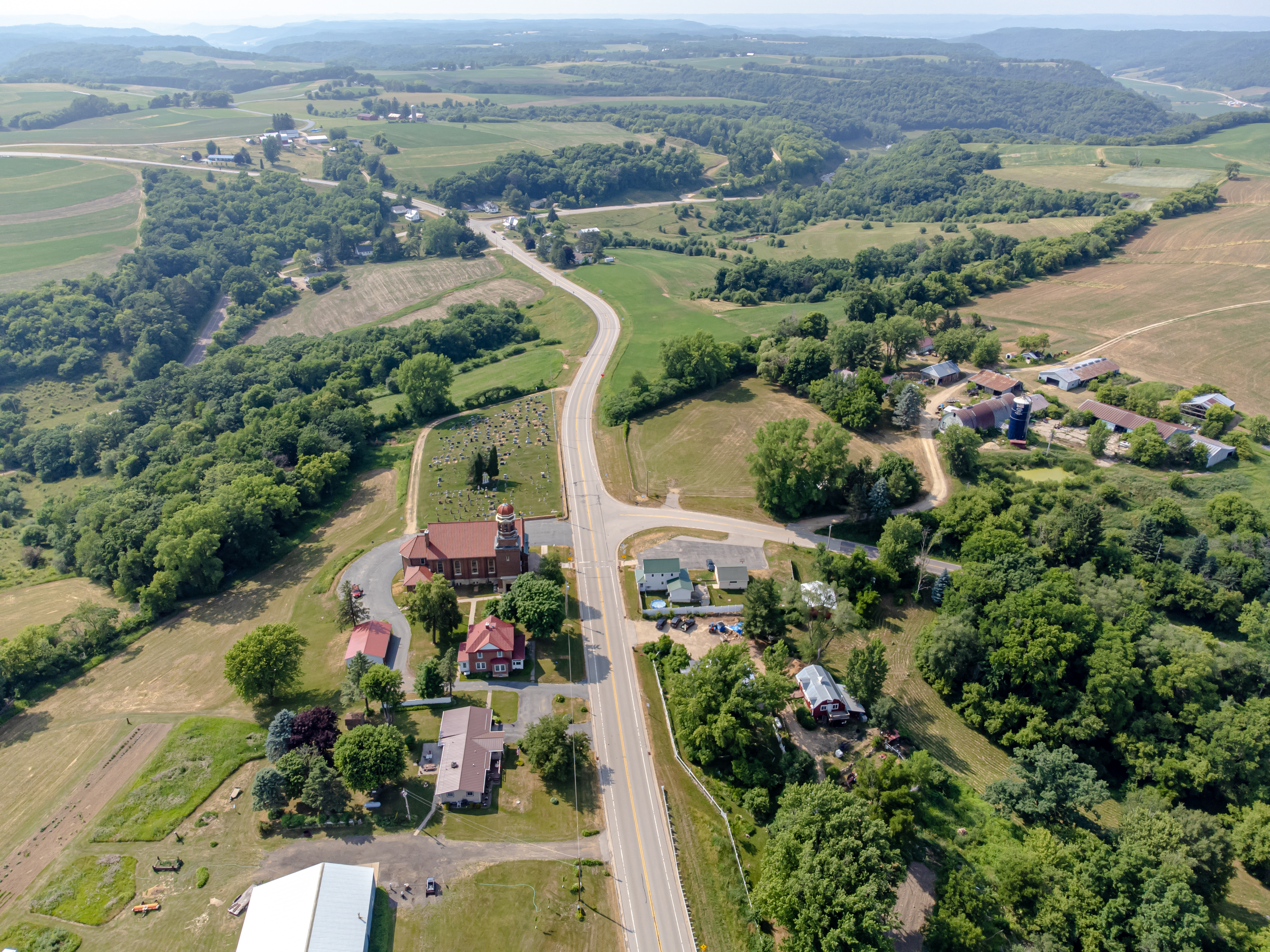
- Wisconsin Highway 33 and Wisconsin Highway 162 junction in the center of Middle Ridge

- Location within Wisconsin Location within the United States
- Coordinates: 43°48′03″N 90°56′48″W
- Country: United States
- State: Wisconsin
- County: La Crosse
- Town: Washington
- Elevation: 1,266 ft (386 m)
- Time zone: UTC-6 (Central (CST))
  - Summer (DST): UTC-5 (CDT)
- Area code: 608
- GNIS feature ID: 1569431

Middle Ridge (also called St. Peter's Ridge) is an unincorporated community in the town of Washington in La Crosse County, Wisconsin, United States.
