= Four Corners, Monroe County, Wisconsin =

Four Corners, Wisconsin
- Unincorporated community
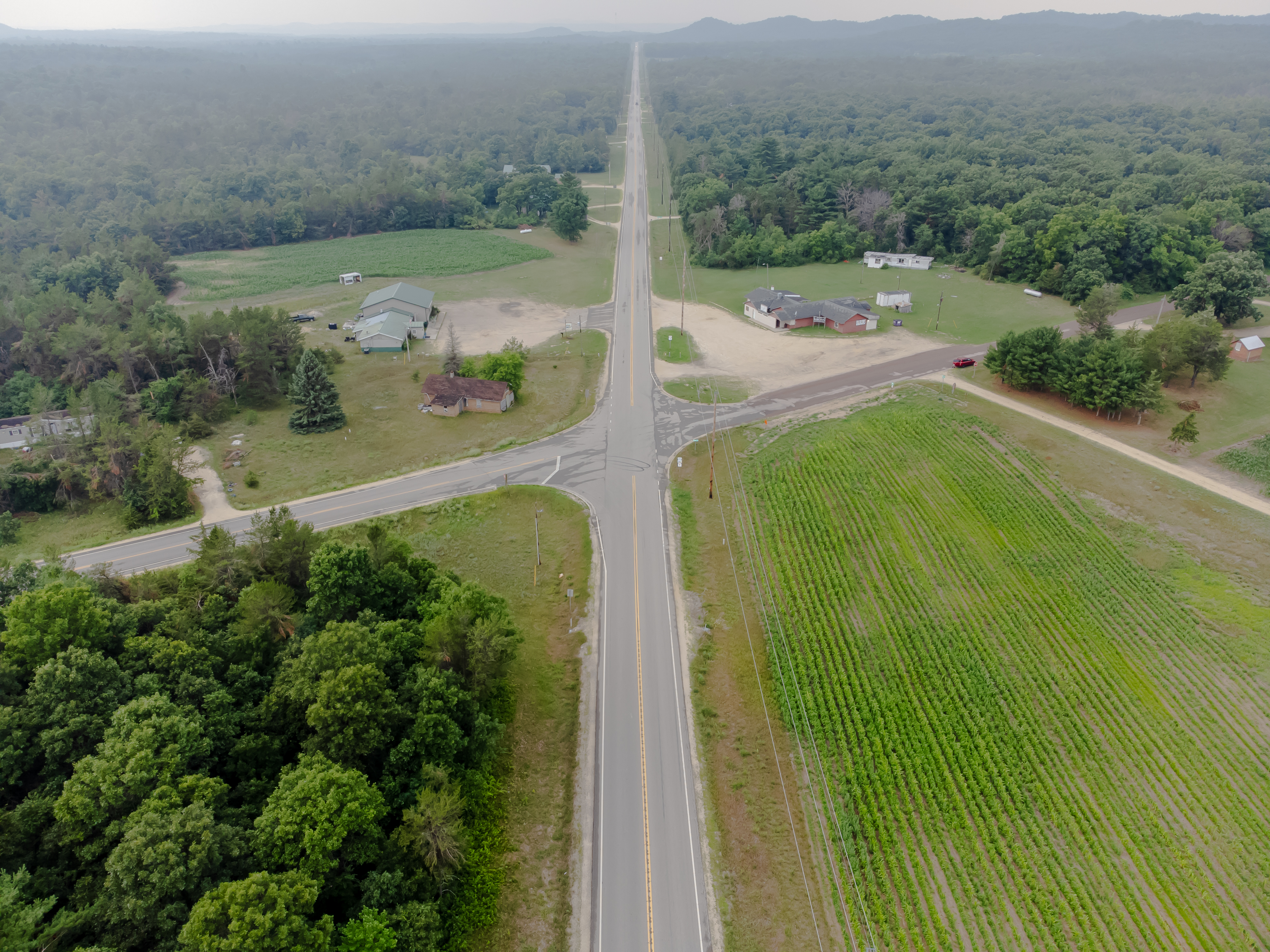
- Sign for Four Corners on WIS 71, near its junction with WIS 162

- Location within Wisconsin Location within the United States
- Coordinates: 44°04′30″N 90°54′49″W
- Country: United States
- State: Wisconsin
- County: Monroe
- Elevation: 879 ft (268 m)
- Time zone: UTC-6 (Central (CST))
  - Summer (DST): UTC-5 (CDT)
- Area code: 608
- GNIS feature ID: 1572605

Four Corners is an unincorporated community located in the town of Little Falls, Monroe County, Wisconsin, United States.

== Location ==
Four Corners is located at the junction of Wisconsin highways 71 and 162, 6 miles (9.7 km) southeast of Melrose.
