= Cataract, Wisconsin =

Census-designated place in Wisconsin, United States

- Census-designated place
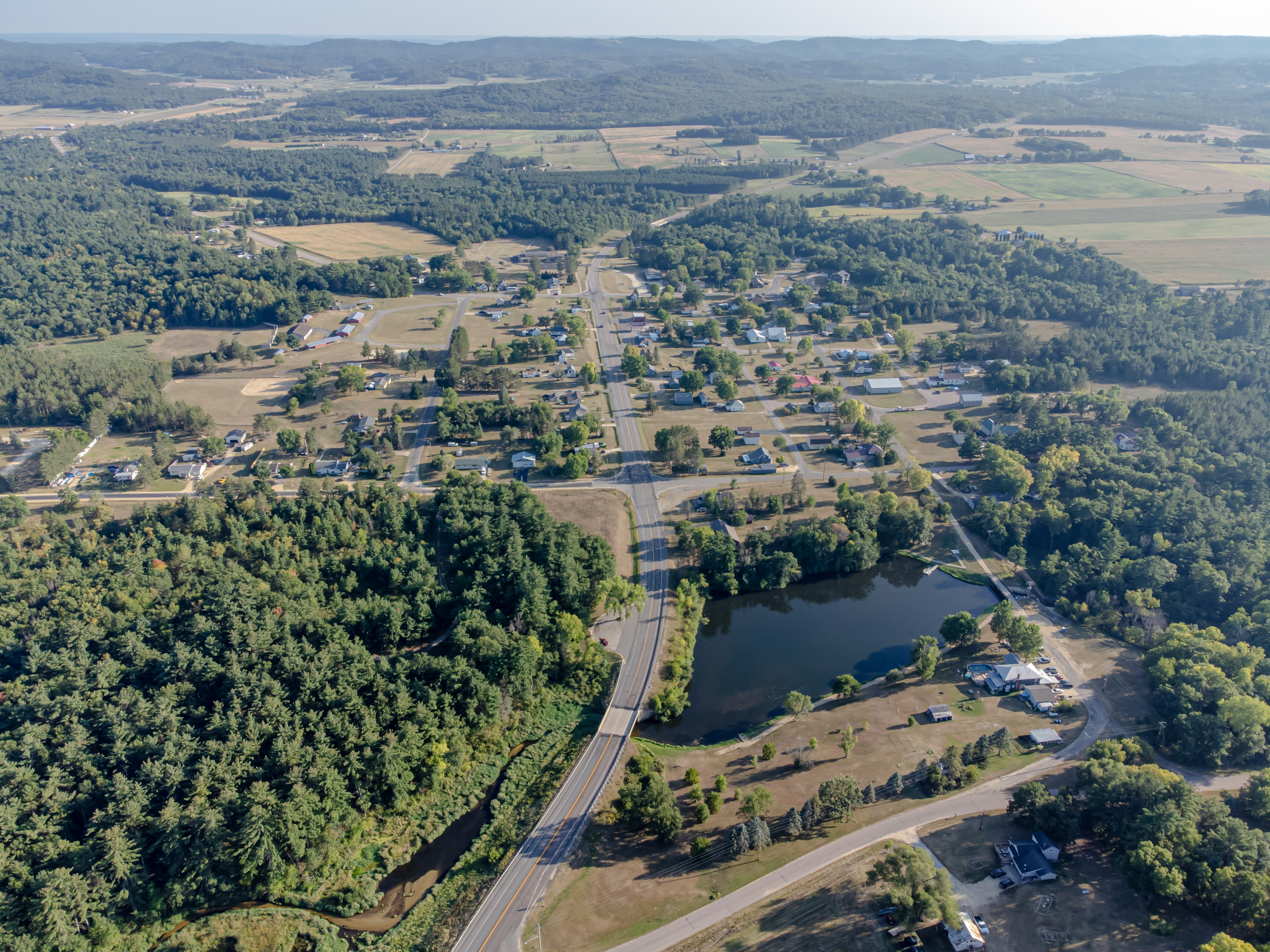

- Location within Wisconsin
- Coordinates: 44°05′16″N 90°50′32″W
- Country: United States
- State: Wisconsin
- County: Monroe

Area
  - Total: 0.594 sq mi (1.54 km^{2})
  - Land: 0.594 sq mi (1.54 km^{2})
  - Water: 0 sq mi (0 km^{2})
- Elevation: 850 ft (260 m)

Population (2020)
  - Total: 220
  - Density: 370/sq mi (140/km^{2})
- Time zone: UTC-6 (Central (CST))
  - Summer (DST): UTC-5 (CDT)
- Area code: 608
- GNIS feature ID: 1562802

Cataract is a census-designated place (CDP) in the Town of Little Falls in Monroe County, Wisconsin, United States. As of the 2020 census, its population was 220, up from 186 at the 2010 census.

== Geography ==
Cataract has an area of 0.594 square miles (1.54 km^{2}), all land.

== Attractions ==
The Paul and Matilda Wegner Grotto, located southwest of the village, is an outdoor collection of concrete folk-art sculptures encrusted with shards of glass, ceramics, seashells, and other materials. These have a variety of themes, including religious and patriotic subjects and more personal mementos of the lives of Paul and Matilda Wegner. The grotto was built between 1929 and 1942 by the Wegners on their farm, and is now owned by Monroe County and maintained by an endowment established for that purpose.

Southeast of Cataract is The Little Falls Railroad & Doll Museum, with a garden railway, model railroad layout, and doll collection.

The Walczak-Wontor Quarry Pit Workshop is located in the vicinity of Cataract; it is listed on the National Register of Historic Places.

== Notable people ==
- John McKendree Springer, Methodist clergyman, was born in Cataract.

== Images ==
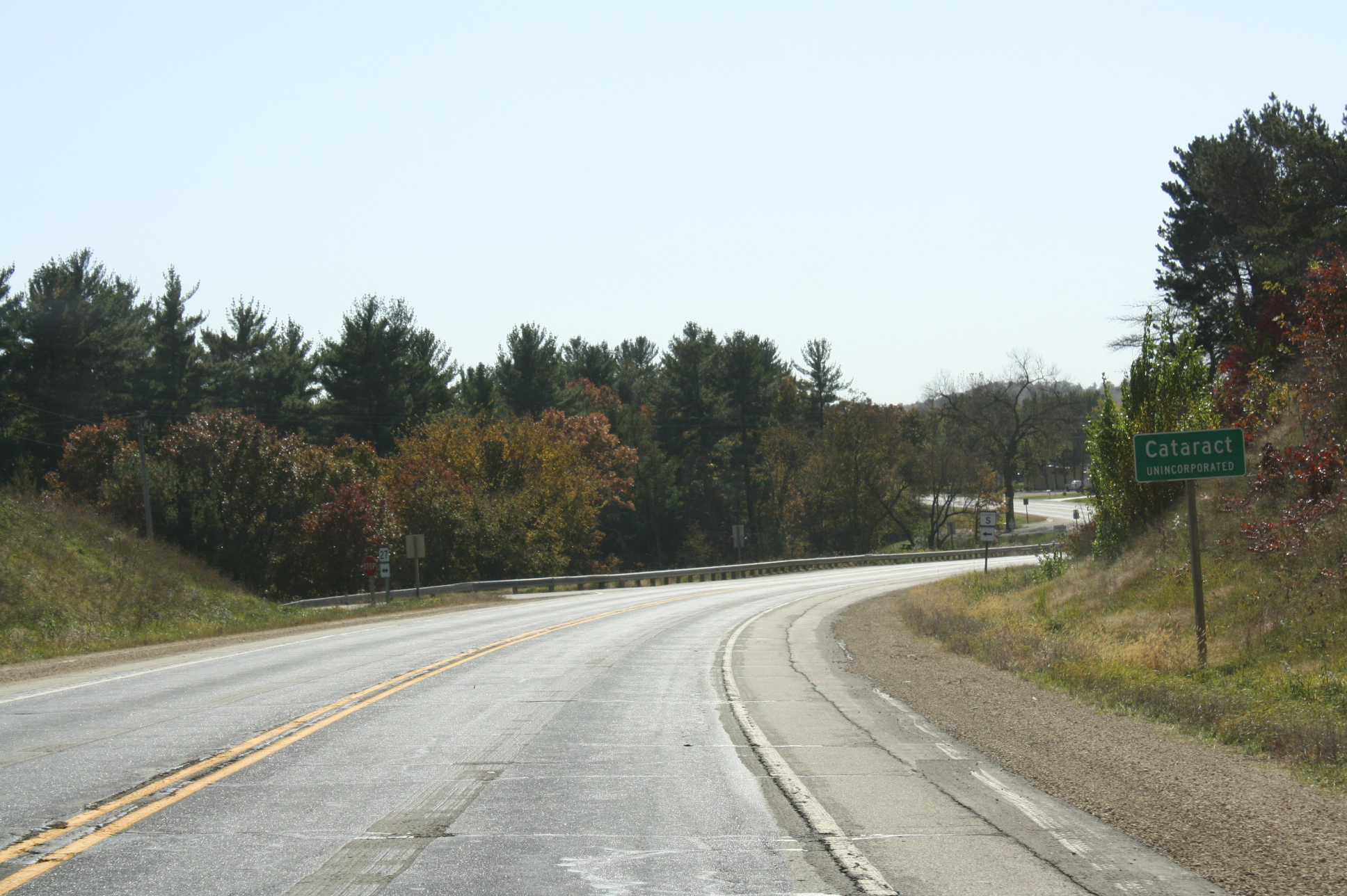
Sign

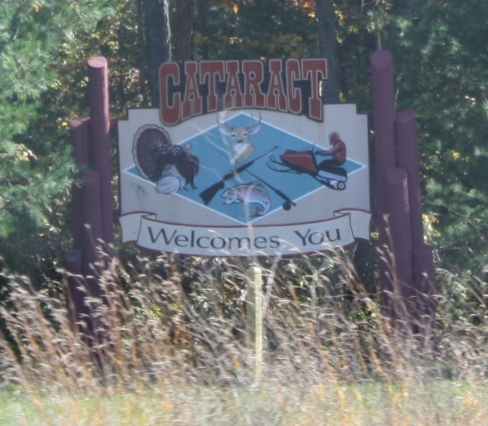
Welcome sign

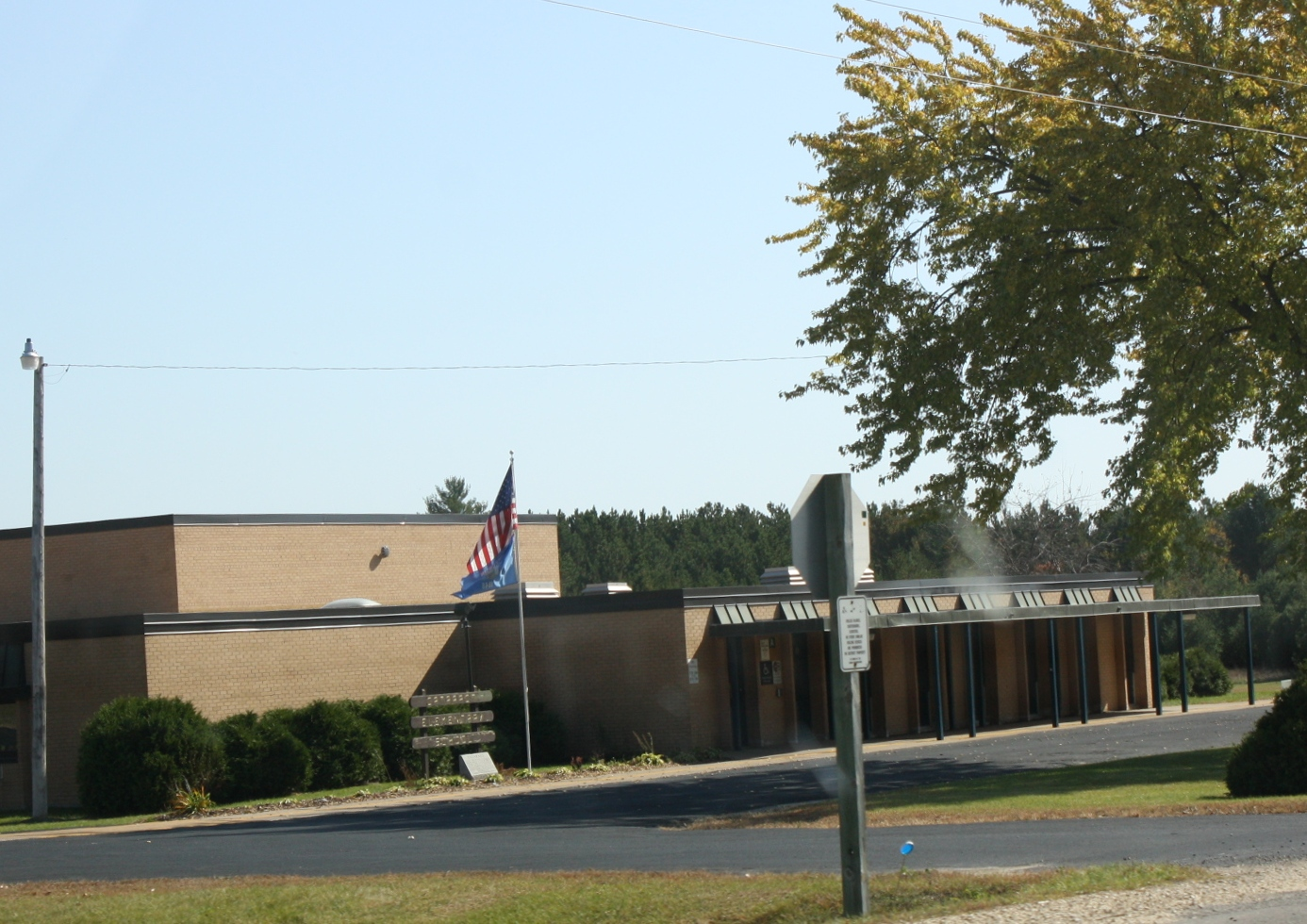
Elementary school

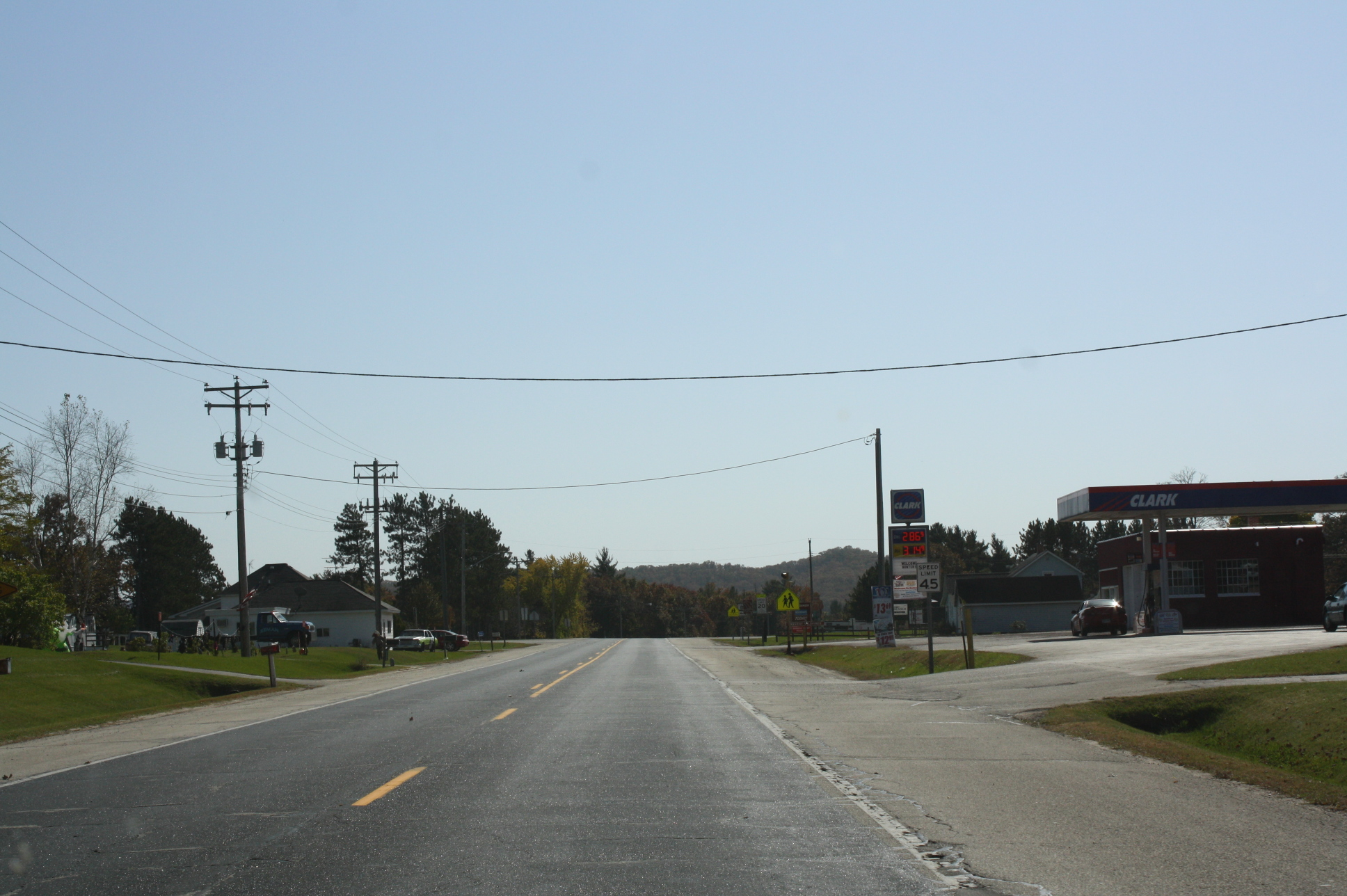
Downtown Cataract

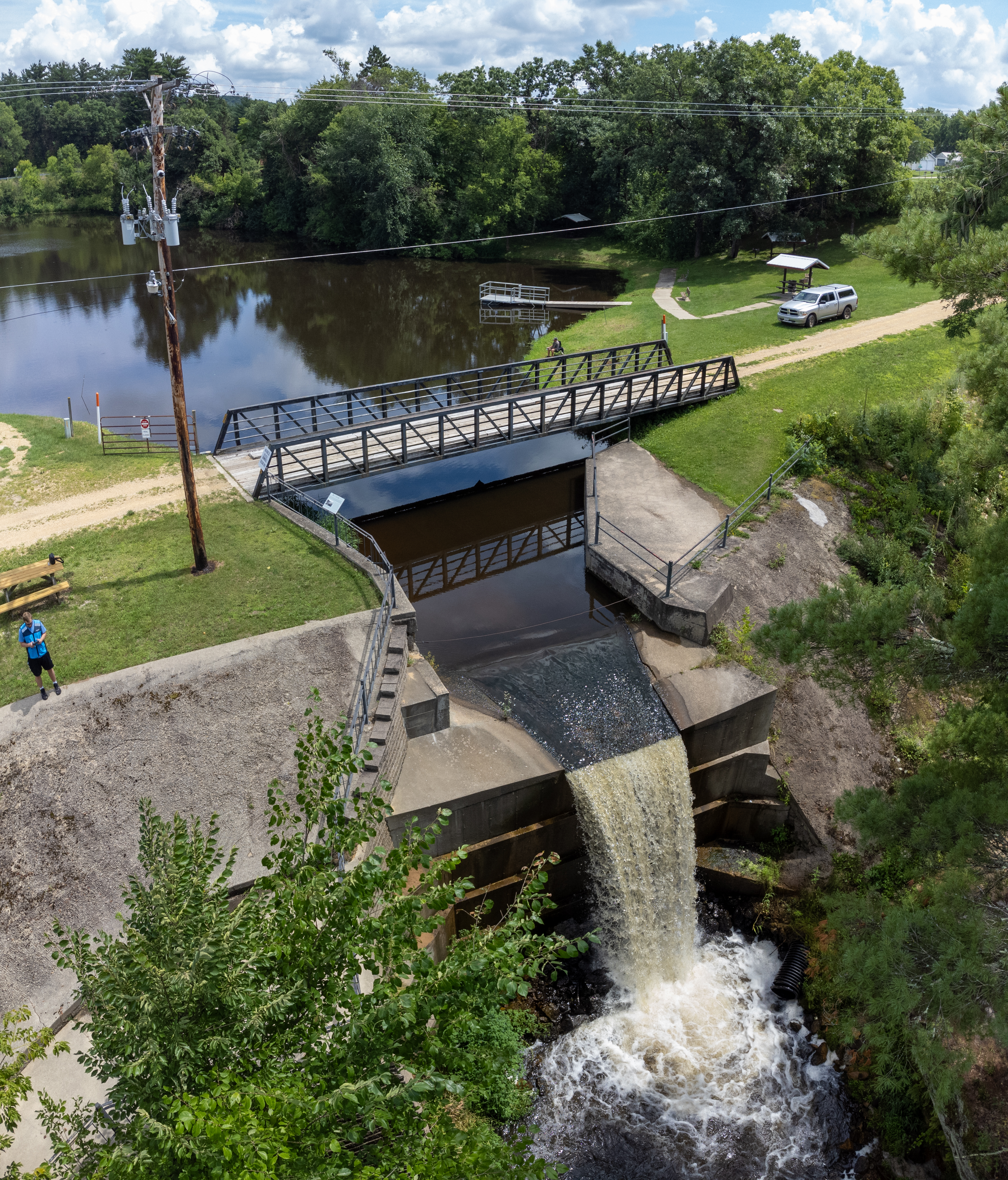
Cataract dam waterfall

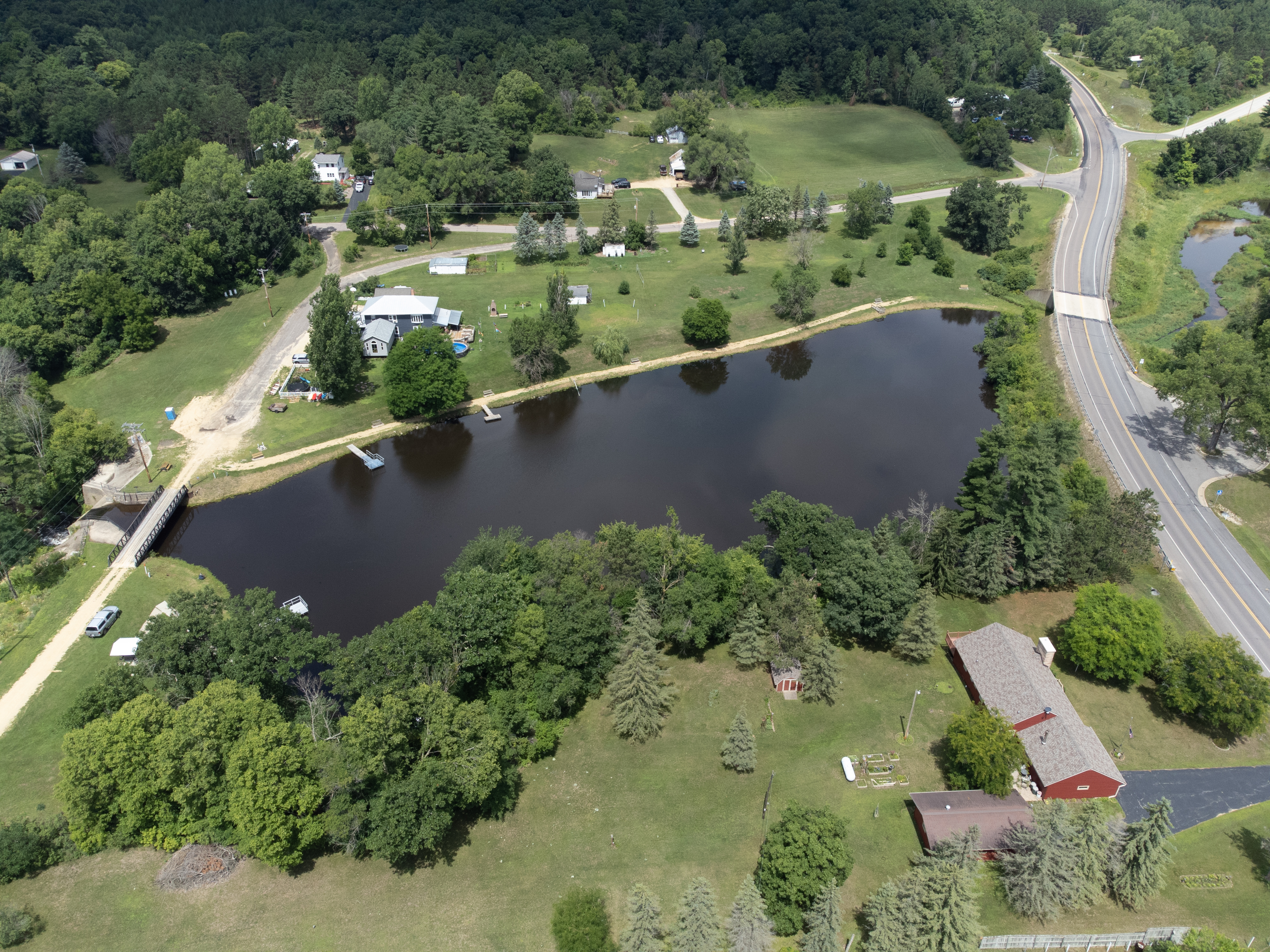
Cataract pond

== See also ==
- List of census-designated places in Wisconsin
- Wisconsin Highway 27
