= Coon Valley, Wisconsin =

- Village
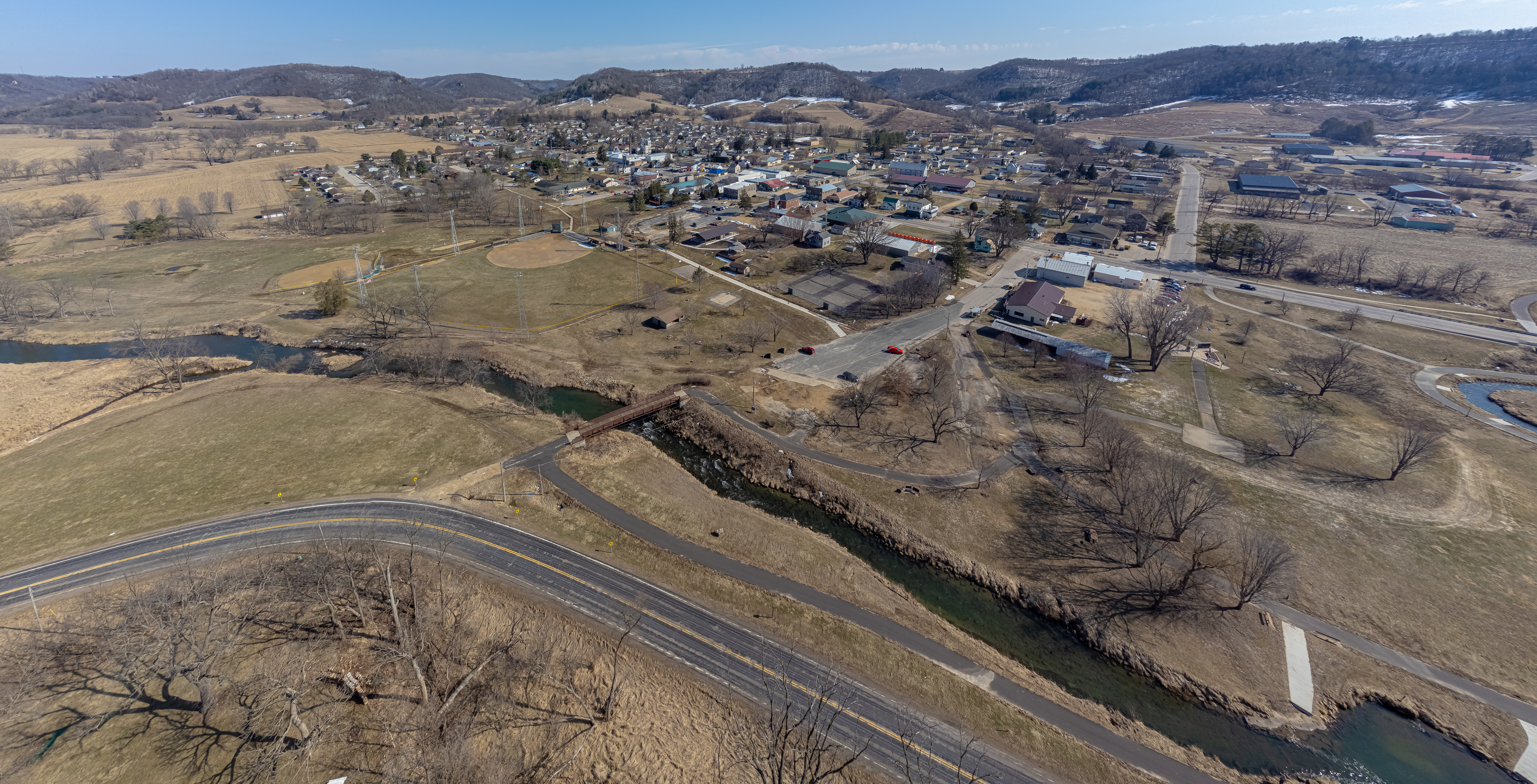

- Location of Coon Valley in Vernon County, Wisconsin.
- Coordinates: 43°42′6″N 91°0′51″W
- Country: United States
- State: Wisconsin
- County: Vernon

Area
  - Total: 1.12 sq mi (2.89 km^{2})
  - Land: 1.12 sq mi (2.89 km^{2})
  - Water: 0.0039 sq mi (0.01 km^{2})
- Elevation: 738 ft (225 m)

Population (2020)
  - Total: 758
  - Density: 706.4/sq mi (272.74/km^{2})
- Time zone: UTC-6 (Central (CST))
  - Summer (DST): UTC-5 (CDT)
- Area code: 608
- FIPS code: 55-16900
- GNIS feature ID: 1563376
- Website: http://www.villageofcoonvalley.com/

Coon Valley is a village in Vernon County, Wisconsin, United States. The population was 758 at the 2020 census. Coon Valley was hit by the floods ravaging Wisconsin in 2018.

== Geography ==
Coon Valley is located at 43°42′6″N 91°0′51″W (43.701628, -91.014083).

According to the United States Census Bureau, the village has a total area of 1.09 square miles (2.82 km^{2}), all land.

== Demographics ==
Historical population
Census	Pop.	Note	%±
1910	291		—
1920	369		26.8%
1930	462		25.2%
1940	469		1.5%
1950	466		−0.6%
1960	536		15.0%
1970	596		11.2%
1980	758		27.2%
1990	817		7.8%
2000	714		−12.6%
2010	765		7.1%
2020	758		−0.9%
U.S. Decennial Census

Many of the first White settlers in Coon Valley were Norwegian immigrants. The Norwegian language is no longer fluently spoken in the area, but there are a very few older people who remember pieces of vocabulary and grammar.

=== 2010 census ===
As of the census of 2010, there were 765 people, 324 households, and 216 families living in the village. The population density was 701.8 inhabitants per square mile (271.0/km^{2}). There were 348 housing units at an average density of 319.3 per square mile (123.3/km^{2}). The racial makeup of the village was 98.3% White, 0.1% African American, 0.7% Asian, 0.5% from other races, and 0.4% from two or more races. Hispanic or Latino of any race were 0.7% of the population.

There were 324 households, of which 32.1% had children under the age of 18 living with them, 51.9% were married couples living together, 8.0% had a female householder with no husband present, 6.8% had a male householder with no wife present, and 33.3% were non-families. 26.9% of all households were made up of individuals, and 14.8% had someone living alone who was 65 years of age or older. The average household size was 2.32 and the average family size was 2.81.

The median age in the village was 41.3 years. 22.7% of residents were under the age of 18; 7% were between the ages of 18 and 24; 25.4% were from 25 to 44; 23.3% were from 45 to 64; and 21.4% were 65 years of age or older. The gender makeup of the village was 52.5% male and 47.5% female.

=== 2000 census ===
As of the census of 2000, there were 714 people, 307 households, and 209 families living in the village. The population density was 661.1 people per square mile (255.3/km^{2}). There were 332 housing units at an average density of 307.4 per square mile (118.7/km^{2}). The racial makeup of the village was 99.30% White, 0.14% Native American, 0.42% Asian, 0.14% from other races. Hispanic or Latino of any race were 0.28% of the population.

There were 307 households, out of which 27.7% had children under the age of 18 living with them, 57.3% were married couples living together, 6.8% had a female householder with no husband present, and 31.9% were non-families. 28.0% of all households were made up of individuals, and 16.0% had someone living alone who was 65 years of age or older. The average household size was 2.28 and the average family size was 2.78.

In the village, the population was spread out, with 22.4% under the age of 18, 4.8% from 18 to 24, 28.3% from 25 to 44, 23.4% from 45 to 64, and 21.1% who were 65 years of age or older. The median age was 42 years. For every 100 females, there were 105.2 males. For every 100 females age 18 and over, there were 97.2 males.

The median income for a household in the village was $36,458, and the median income for a family was $45,962. Males had a median income of $31,736 versus $21,176 for females. The per capita income for the village was $18,292. About 6.3% of families and 9.4% of the population were below the poverty line, including 15.5% of those under age 18 and 16.5% of those age 65 or over.

== Transportation ==
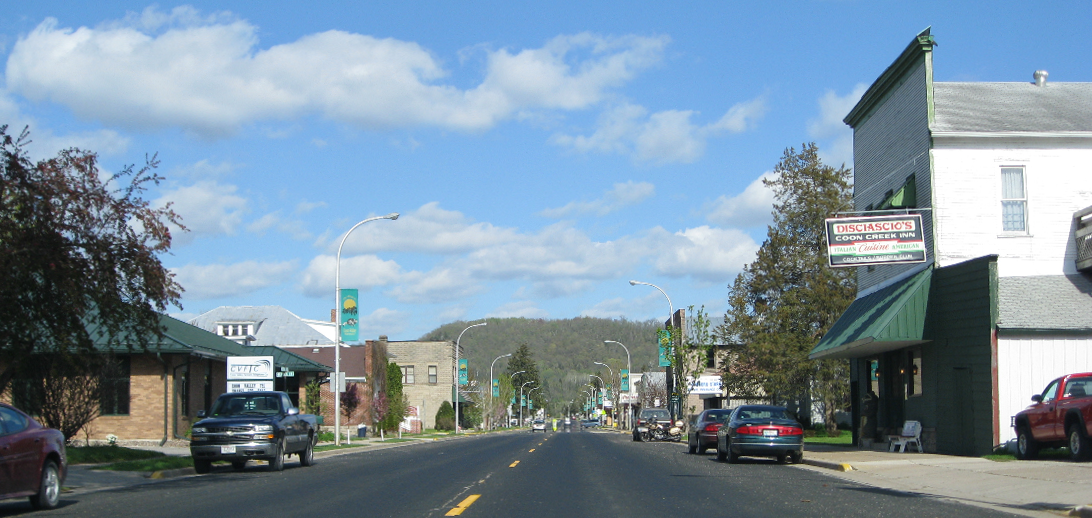
Wisconsin Highway 162 14 / 61 through Coon Valley

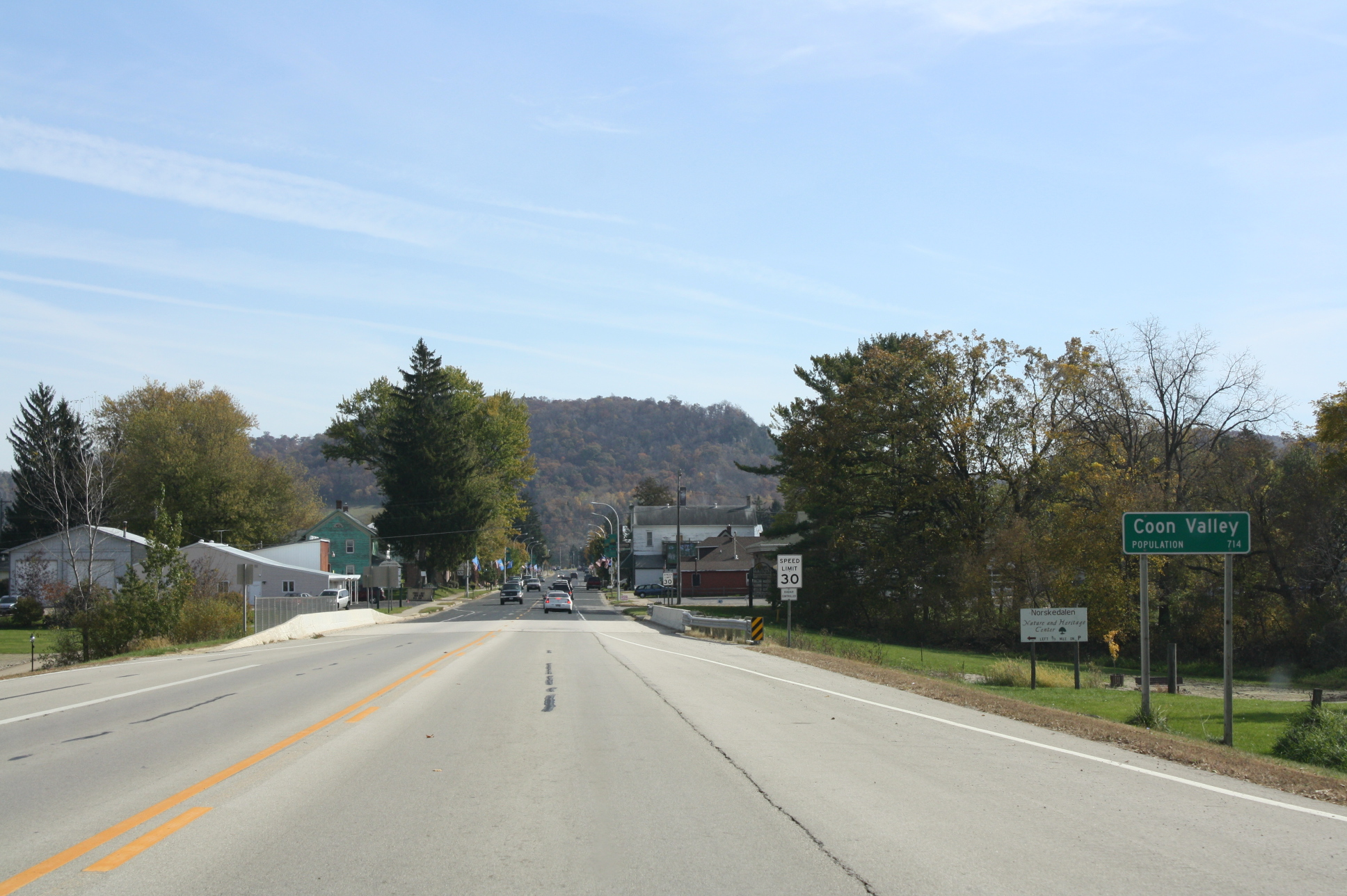
Sign

Bus service towards La Crosse or Viroqua is provided seven times daily per direction by Scenic Mississippi Regional Transit.

The closest passenger rail station is the La Crosse station in La Crosse, served by Amtrak's Empire Builder.

== Recreation ==
- Coon Valley Veterans Memorial Park
- Knutson Memorial Library, located on Main Street, is the village's public library.
- Norskedalen is located near Coon Valley.
- Skumsrud Heritage Farm is approximately one mile west of Coon Valley.

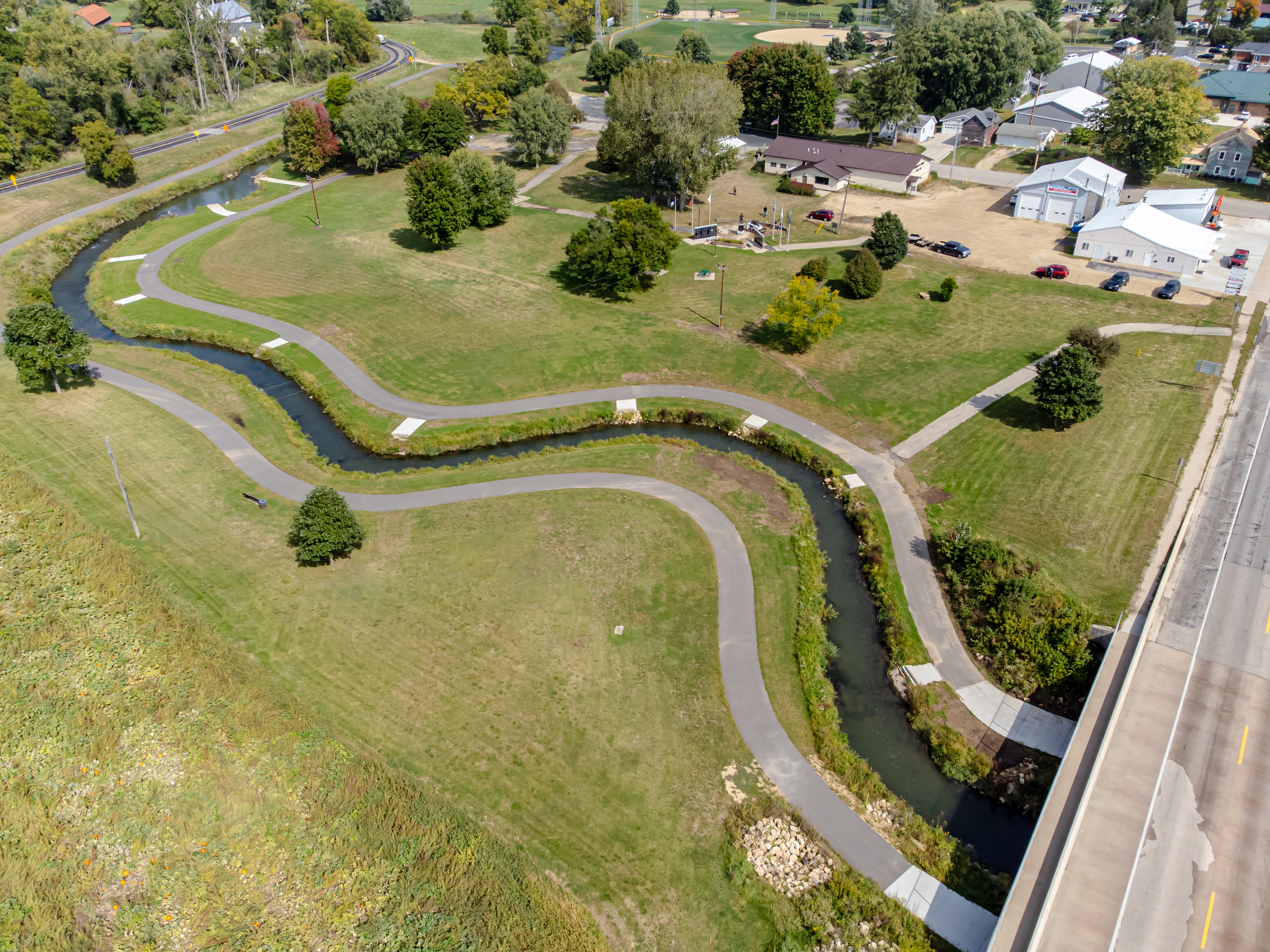
Coon Creek

== Notable residents ==
- Brian Rude, Vice President-External and Media Relations, Dairyland Power Cooperative, served 17 years in the Wisconsin State Legislature
- Scott Servais, baseball player (Astros, Cubs, Rockies), member 1988 U.S. Olympics Gold Medal Team, former manager of the Seattle Mariners major league baseball team.

== See also ==
- List of villages in Wisconsin
