= Little Falls, Wisconsin =

- Town
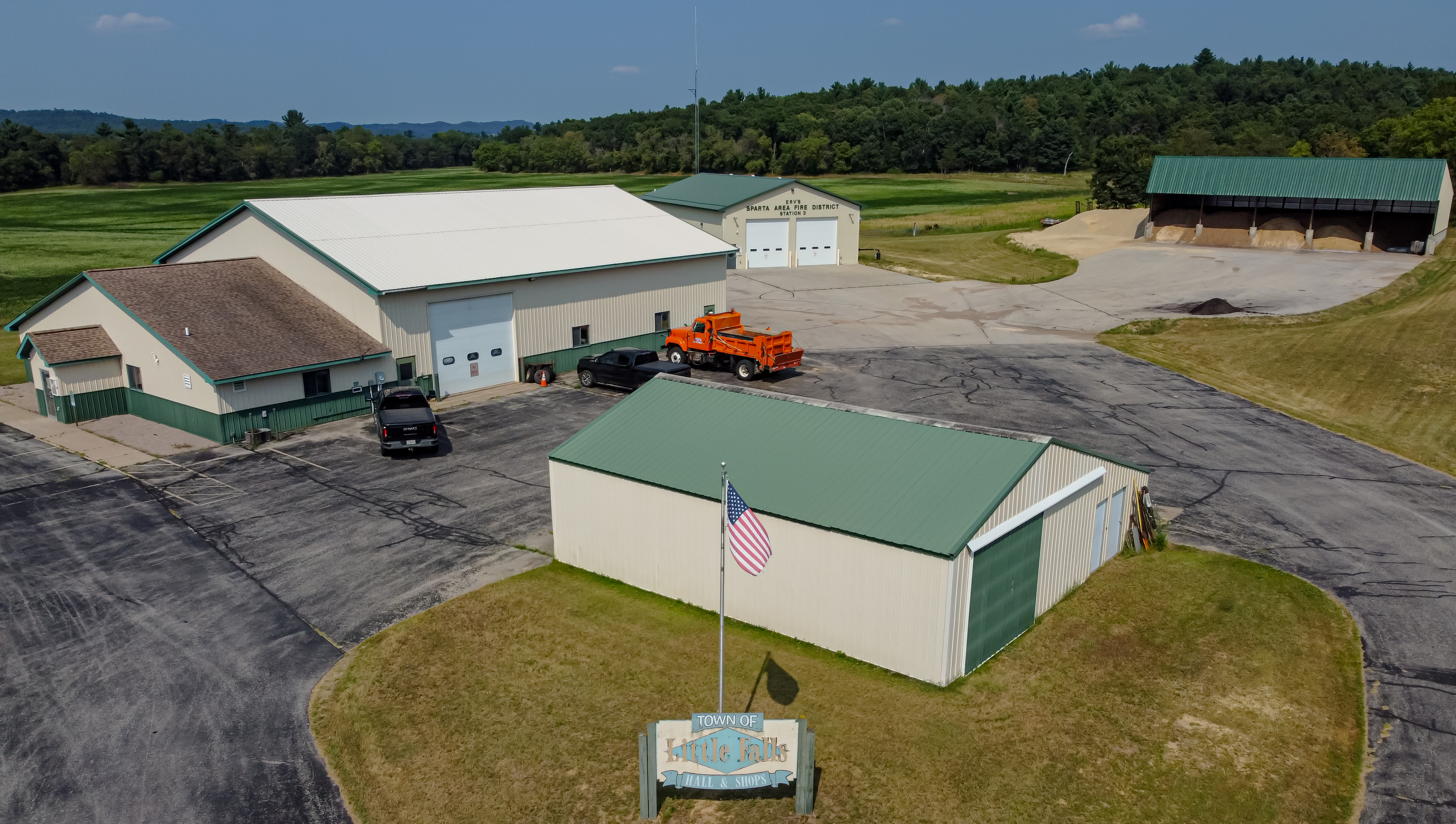
- Town hall in Cataract

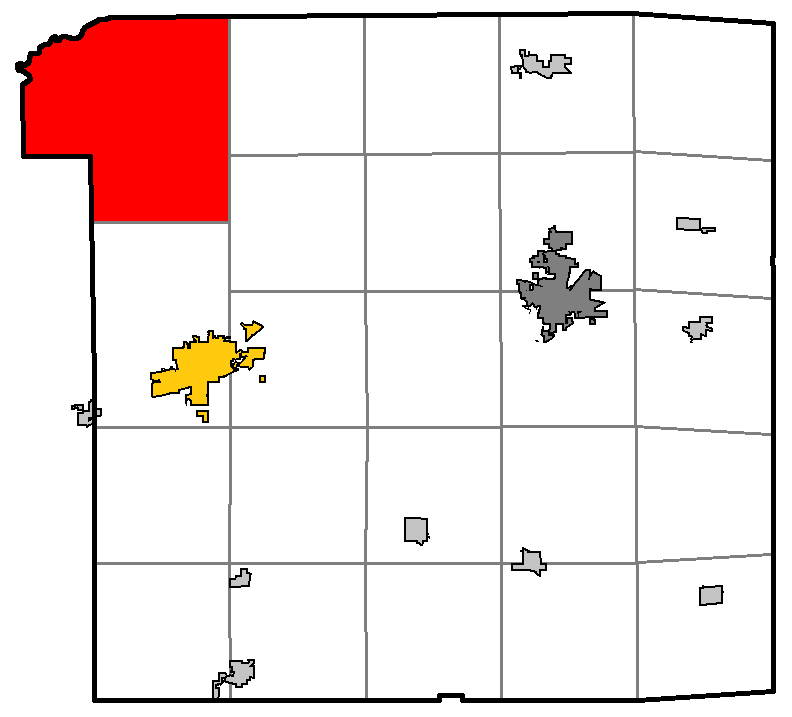
- Location of Little Falls, Monroe County

- Location of Monroe County, Wisconsin
- Coordinates: 44°5′40″N 90°52′12″W
- Country: United States
- State: Wisconsin
- County: Monroe

Area
  - Total: 68.8 sq mi (178.2 km^{2})
  - Land: 68.4 sq mi (177.1 km^{2})
  - Water: 0.42 sq mi (1.1 km^{2})
- Elevation: 827 ft (252 m)

Population (2020)
  - Total: 1,509
  - Density: 22.07/sq mi (8.521/km^{2})
- Time zone: UTC-6 (Central (CST))
  - Summer (DST): UTC-5 (CDT)
- Postal codes: 54656 (Sparta)
- Area code: 608
- FIPS code: 55-44975
- GNIS feature ID: 1583582
- Website: https://townoflittlefalls.wi.gov/

Little Falls is a town in Monroe County, Wisconsin, United States. The population was 1,509 at the 2020 census. The unincorporated communities of Cataract and Four Corners are located in the town.

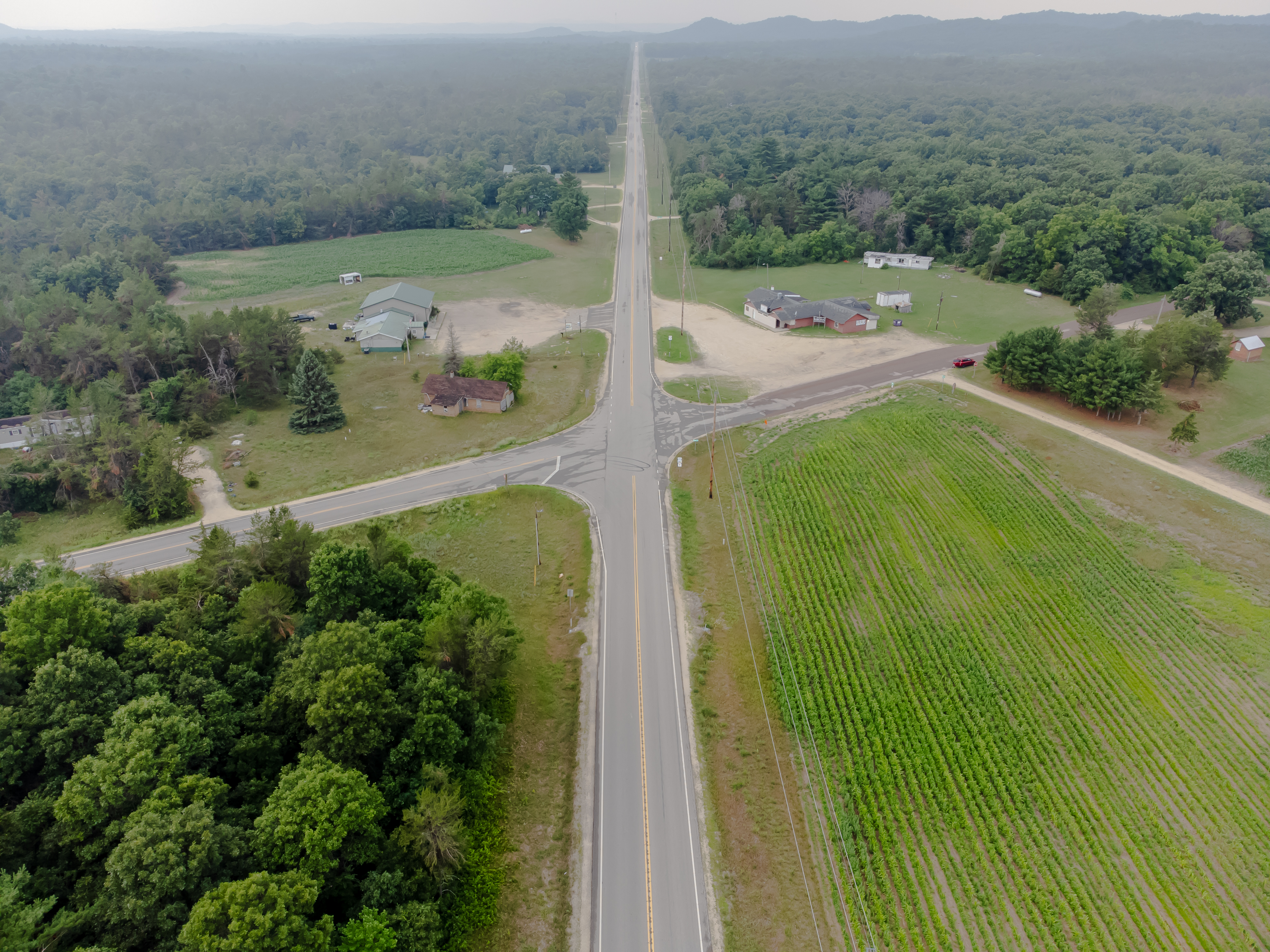
Four Corners, Wisconsin

== Geography ==
According to the United States Census Bureau, the town has a total area of 68.8 square miles (178.2 km^{2}), of which 68.4 square miles (177.1 km^{2}) is land and 0.4 square mile (1.1 km^{2}) (0.61%) is water.

== Demographics ==
As of the census of 2000, there were 1,334 people, 506 households, and 384 families residing in the town. The population density was 19.5 people per square mile (7.5/km^{2}). There were 580 housing units at an average density of 8.5 per square mile (3.3/km^{2}). The racial makeup of the town was 98.05% White, 0.07% African American, 0.22% Native American, 0.30% Asian, 0.07% Pacific Islander, 0.30% from other races, and 0.97% from two or more races. Hispanic or Latino people of any race were 0.60% of the population.

There were 506 households, out of which 33.6% had children under the age of 18 living with them, 66.2% were married couples living together, 3.4% had a female householder with no husband present, and 24.1% were non-families. 20.2% of all households were made up of individuals, and 9.5% had someone living alone who was 65 years of age or older. The average household size was 2.62 and the average family size was 3.02.

In the town, the population was spread out, with 26.5% under the age of 18, 6.6% from 18 to 24, 27.4% from 25 to 44, 26.7% from 45 to 64, and 12.8% who were 65 years of age or older. The median age was 39 years. For every 100 females, there were 110.1 males. For every 100 females age 18 and over, there were 109.6 males.

The median income for a household in the town was $36,172, and the median income for a family was $40,000. Males had a median income of $28,173 versus $19,688 for females. The per capita income for the town was $16,315. About 6.4% of families and 10.2% of the population were below the poverty line, including 17.9% of those under age 18 and 6.4% of those age 65 or over.

== See also ==
- List of towns in Wisconsin
