= Hamburg, Vernon County, Wisconsin =

Hamburg, Wisconsin
- Town
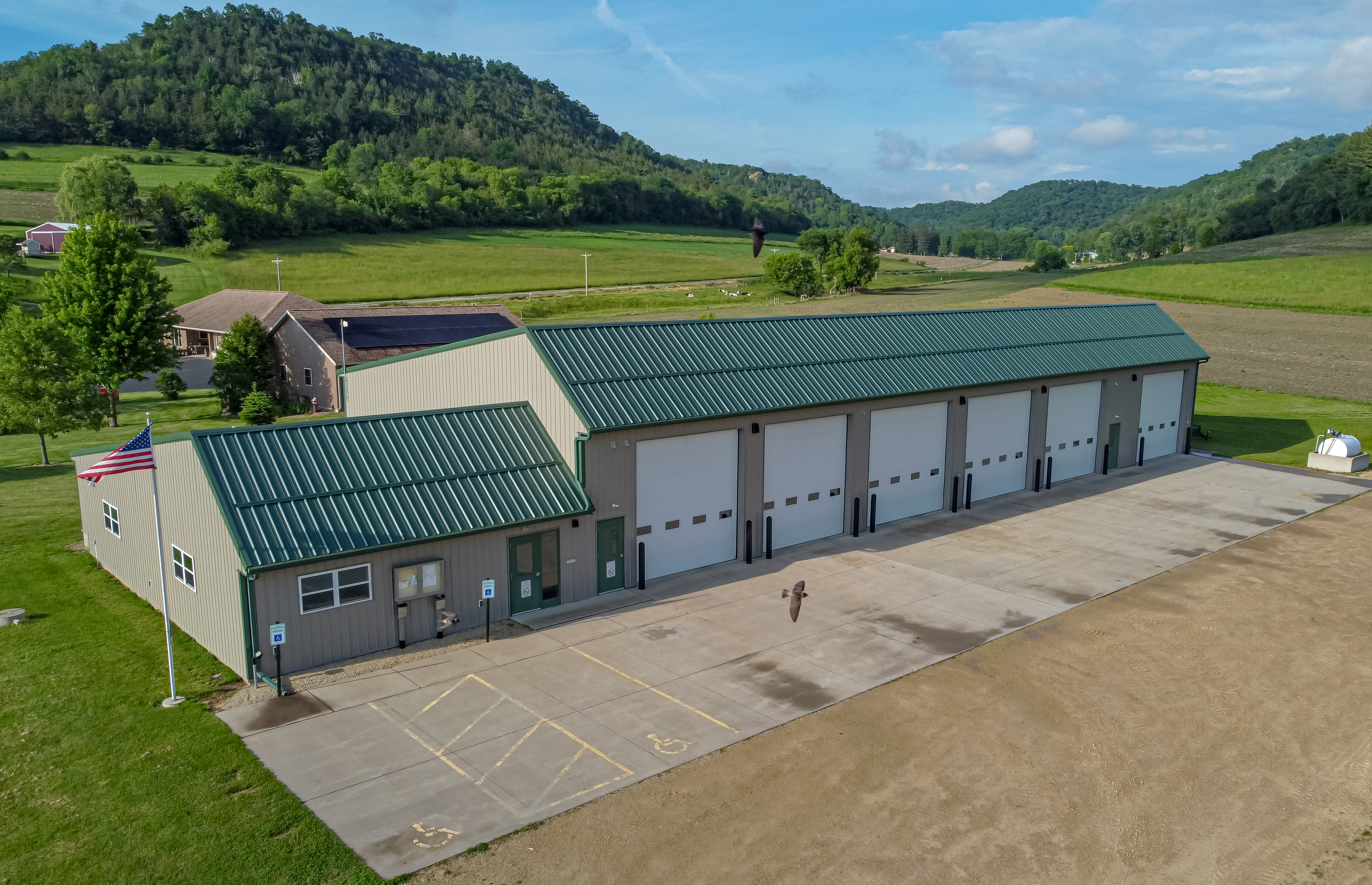
- Hamburg Town Hall just north of Chaseburg

- Location in Vernon County and the state of Wisconsin.
- Coordinates: 43°40′40″N 91°5′24″W
- Country: United States
- State: Wisconsin
- County: Vernon

Area
  - Total: 35.8 sq mi (92.8 km^{2})
  - Land: 35.8 sq mi (92.7 km^{2})
  - Water: 0 sq mi (0.0 km^{2})
- Elevation: 1,007 ft (307 m)

Population (2020)
  - Total: 956
  - Density: 26.7/sq mi (10.3/km^{2})
- Time zone: UTC-6 (Central (CST))
  - Summer (DST): UTC-5 (CDT)
- Area code: 608
- FIPS code: 55-32225
- GNIS feature ID: 1583339
- Website: http://www.tn.hamburg.wi.gov/

Hamburg is a town in Vernon County, Wisconsin, United States. The population was 848 at the 2000 census.

== Geography ==
According to the United States Census Bureau, the town has a total area of 35.8 square miles (92.8 km^{2}), of which 35.8 square miles (92.7 km^{2}) is land and 0.03% is water.

== Demographics ==
As of the census of 2000, there were 848 people, 311 households, and 241 families residing in the town. The population density was 23.7 people per square mile (9.1/km^{2}). There were 325 housing units at an average density of 9.1 per square mile (3.5/km^{2}). The racial makeup of the town was 99.88% White, and 0.12% from two or more races. Hispanic or Latino of any race were 0.35% of the population.

There were 311 households, out of which 34.1% had children under the age of 18 living with them, 69.5% were married couples living together, 5.1% had a female householder with no husband present, and 22.2% were non-families. 18.3% of all households were made up of individuals, and 7.1% had someone living alone who was 65 years of age or older. The average household size was 2.73 and the average family size was 3.10.

In the town, the population was spread out, with 27.7% under the age of 18, 5.7% from 18 to 24, 29.2% from 25 to 44, 25.2% from 45 to 64, and 12.1% who were 65 years of age or older. The median age was 38 years. For every 100 females, there were 112.0 males. For every 100 females age 18 and over, there were 115.1 males.

The median income for a household in the town was $49,013, and the median income for a family was $53,158. Males had a median income of $33,906 versus $22,500 for females. The per capita income for the town was $19,169. None of the families and 1.2% of the population were living below the poverty line, including no under eighteens and 2.0% of those over 64.
