= Washington, La Crosse County, Wisconsin =

Washington, Wisconsin
- Town
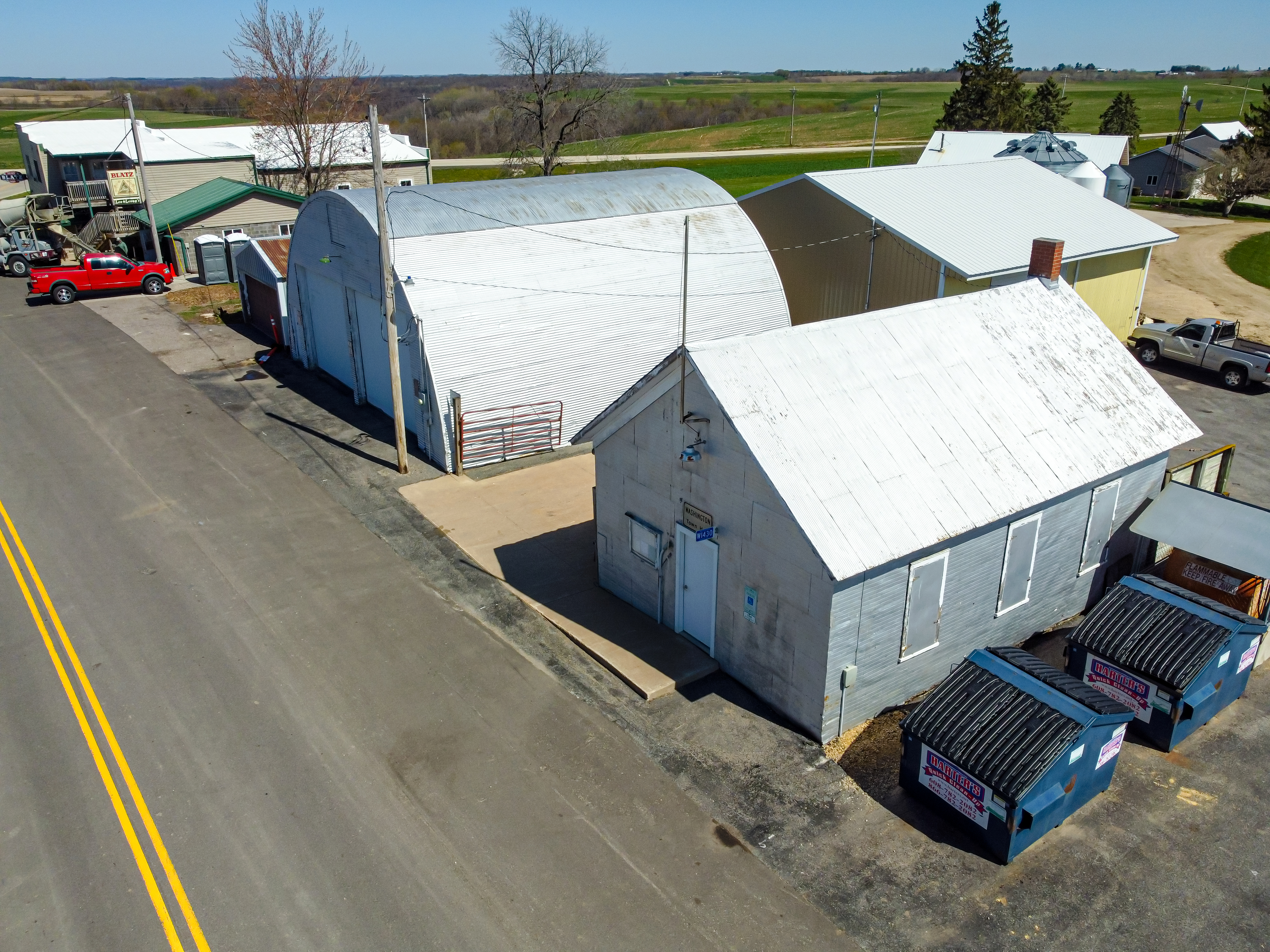
- Town hall in Newberg Corners

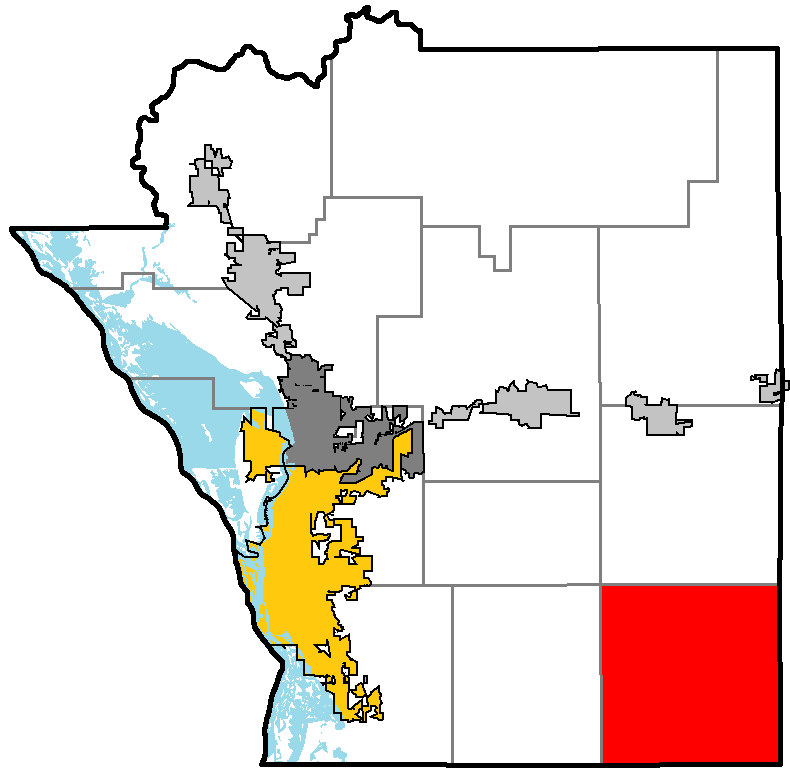
- Location of Washington, La Crosse County

- Location of La Crosse County, Wisconsin
- Coordinates: 43°45′51″N 90°58′50″W
- Country: United States
- State: Wisconsin
- County: La Crosse

Area
  - Total: 36.1 sq mi (93.5 km^{2})
  - Land: 36.1 sq mi (93.5 km^{2})
  - Water: 0 sq mi (0.0 km^{2})
- Elevation: 1,273 ft (388 m)

Population (2020)
  - Total: 519
  - Density: 14.4/sq mi (5.55/km^{2})
- Time zone: UTC-6 (Central (CST))
  - Summer (DST): UTC-5 (CDT)
- Area code: 608
- FIPS code: 55-83650
- GNIS feature ID: 1584355
- Website: http://www.townofwashingtonwi.com/

Washington is a town in La Crosse County, Wisconsin, United States. It is part of the La Crosse, Wisconsin Metropolitan Statistical Area. The population was 519 at the 2020 census. The unincorporated communities of Middle Ridge and Newberg Corners are located in the town.

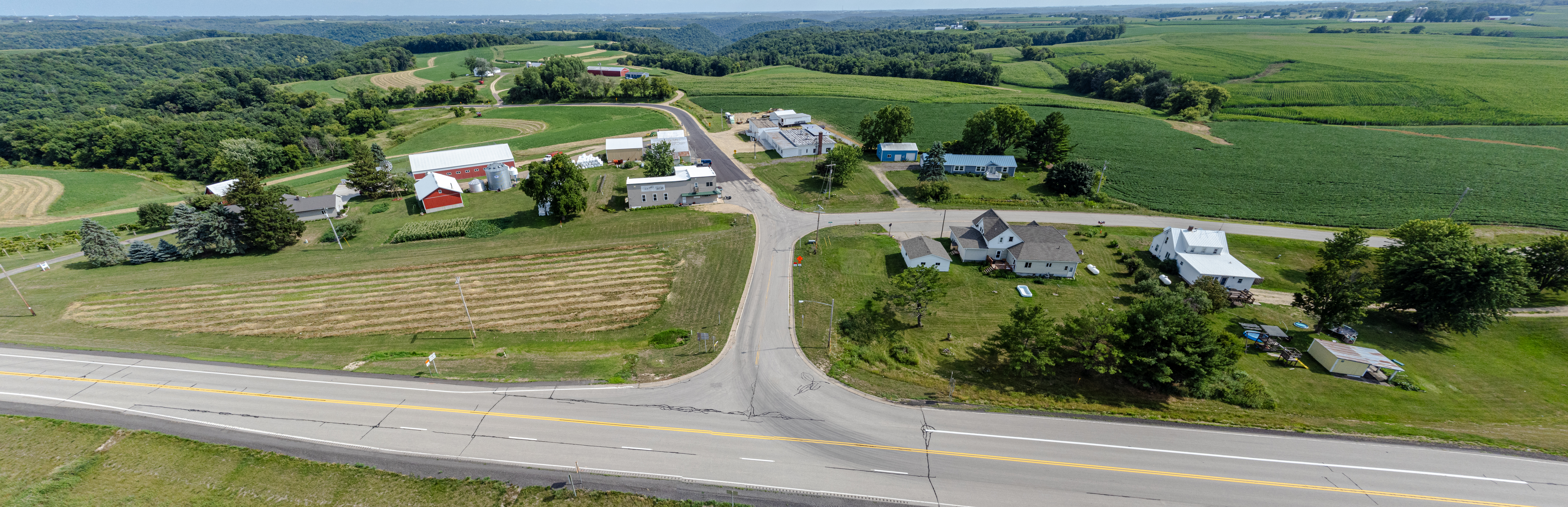
Newberg Corners

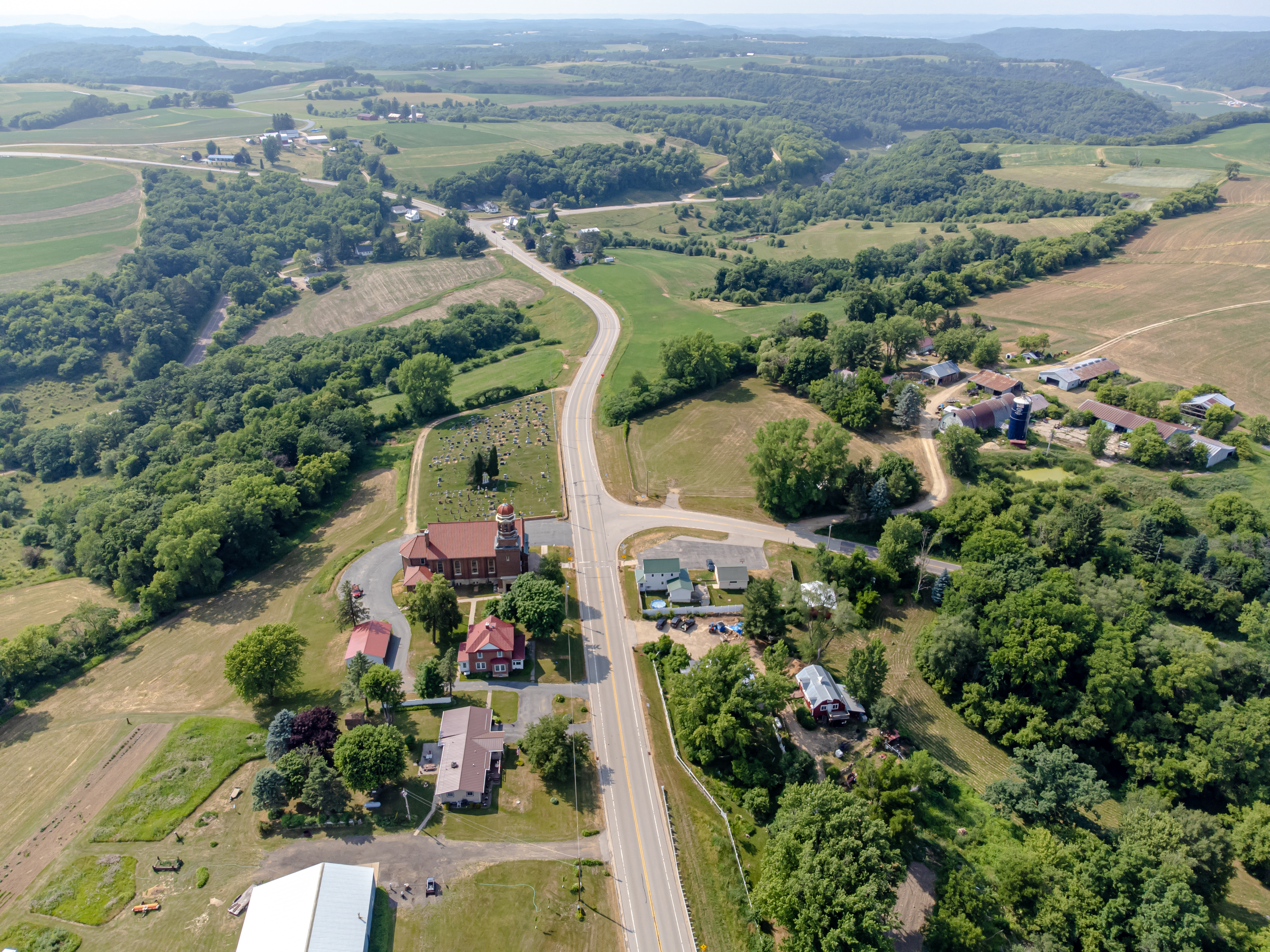
Middle Ridge

== Geography ==
According to the United States Census Bureau, the town has a total area of 36.1 square miles (93.5 km^{2}), all land.

== Demographics ==
Historical population
Year	Pop.	±%
1980	711	—
1990	726	+2.1%
2000	738	+1.7%
2010	745	+0.9%

As of the census of 2000, there were 738 people, 228 households, and 181 families residing in the town. The population density was 20.4 people per square mile (7.9/km^{2}). There were 236 housing units at an average density of 6.5 per square mile (2.5/km^{2}). The racial makeup of the town was 98.10% White, 0.41% Native American, 0.81% Asian, and 0.68% from two or more races.

There were 228 households, out of which 39.0% had children under the age of 18 living with them, 73.7% were married couples living together, 1.3% had a female householder with no husband present, and 20.2% were non-families. 16.7% of all households were made up of individuals, and 9.6% had someone living alone who was 65 years of age or older. The average household size was 2.83 and the average family size was 3.21.

In the town, the population was spread out, with 24.7% under the age of 18, 5.7% from 18 to 24, 26.4% from 25 to 44, 19.8% from 45 to 64, and 23.4% who were 65 years of age or older. The median age was 41 years. For every 100 females, there were 79.6 males. For every 100 females age 18 and over, there were 77.6 males.

The median income for a household in the town was $42,143, and the median income for a family was $49,375. Males had a median income of $30,000 versus $22,292 for females. The per capita income for the town was $16,424. About 5.8% of families and 8.7% of the population were below the poverty line, including 16.0% of those under age 18 and 2.6% of those age 65 or over.
