= Onalaska =

Onalaska may refer to:

- Onalaska, Texas
- Onalaska, Washington
- Onalaska, Wisconsin
- Onalaska (town), Wisconsin
  - Lake Onalaska, a lake in Wisconsin

== See also ==
- Unalaska, Alaska
- Alaska
