= Brice Prairie, Wisconsin =

Census-designated place in Wisconsin, United States

- Census-designated place
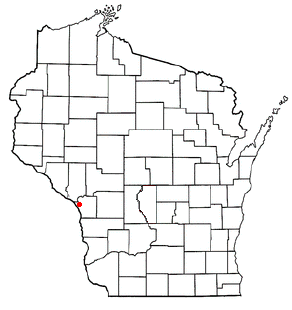
- Location of Brice Prairie, Wisconsin

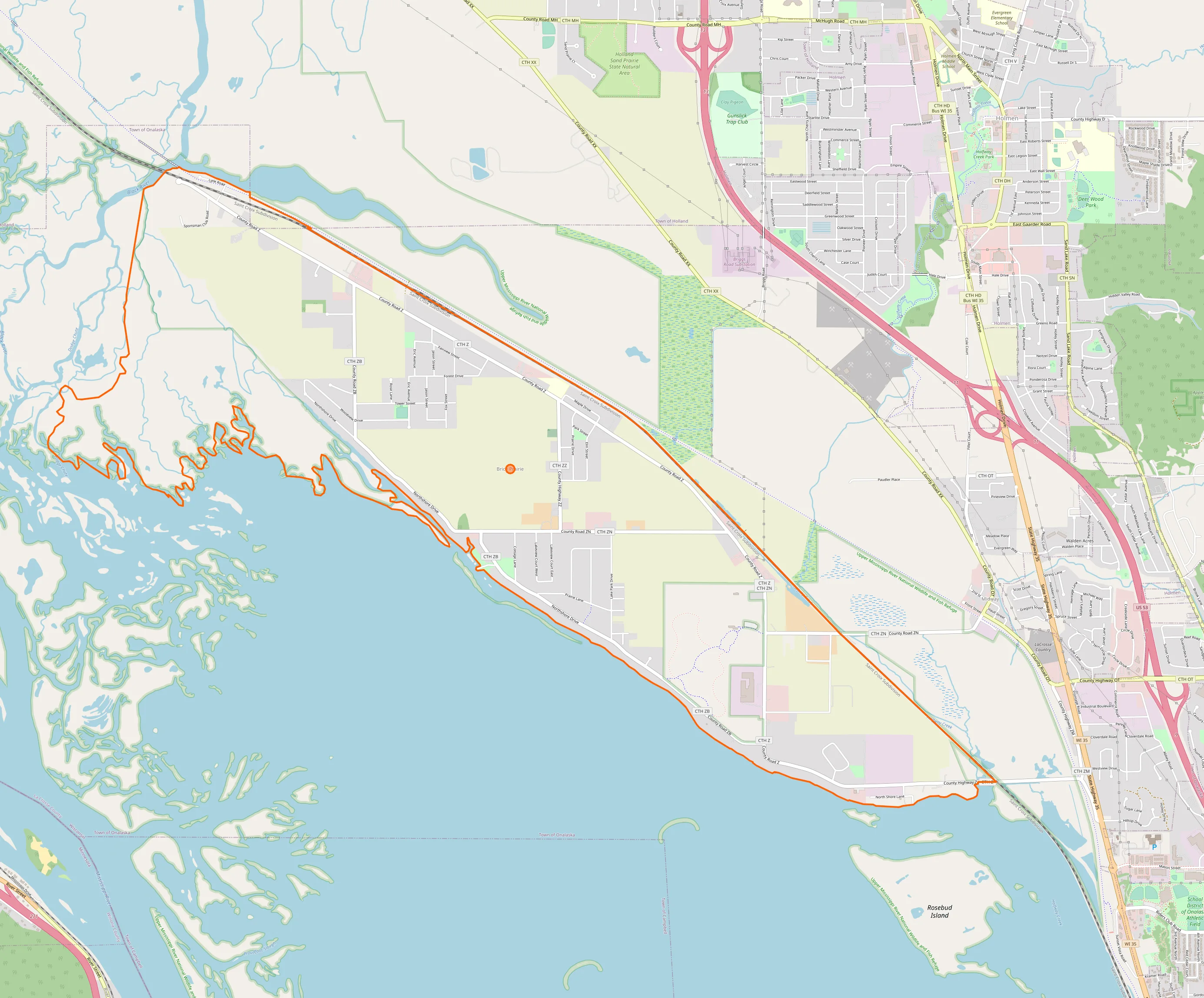
- Coordinates: 43°56′24″N 91°18′37″W
- Country: United States
- State: Wisconsin
- County: La Crosse
- Town: Onalaska

Area
  - Total: 4.59 sq mi (11.88 km^{2})
  - Land: 4.59 sq mi (11.88 km^{2})
  - Water: 0 sq mi (0.0 km^{2})
- Elevation: 666 ft (203 m)

Population (2020)
  - Total: 1,961
  - Density: 427.5/sq mi (165.1/km^{2})
- Time zone: UTC-6 (Central (CST))
  - Summer (DST): UTC-5 (CDT)
- ZIP Code: 54650 (Onalaska)
- Area code: 608
- FIPS code: 55-09465
- GNIS feature ID: 1867653

Brice Prairie is a census-designated place (CDP) in La Crosse County, Wisconsin, United States. As of the 2020 census, Brice Prairie had a population of 1,961. Brice Prairie is located in the Town of Onalaska.

== History ==
Brice Prairie is named after pioneer farmers Alexander and Lucy Brice, who settled there in 1855. Alexander was a United States veteran of the War of 1812.

== Geography ==
Brice Prairie is located on the east bank of the Mississippi River waterway system. It is 6 miles (10 km) northwest of the center of the city of Onalaska and 11 miles (18 km) north of La Crosse, the county seat.

Brice Prairie borders the Mississippi's Lake Onalaska to the southwest and the Black River to the northwest. Halfway Creek empties into Lake Onalaska at the southeastern corner of Brice Prairie. The Upper Mississippi River National Wildlife and Fish Refuge, La Crosse District, borders the CDP to the west and north, and in part to the southeast. Historically, the area has been divided into Lower Brice Prairie and Upper Brice Prairie.

According to the United States Census Bureau, the CDP has a total area of 4.6 square miles (11.9 km^{2}), all land.

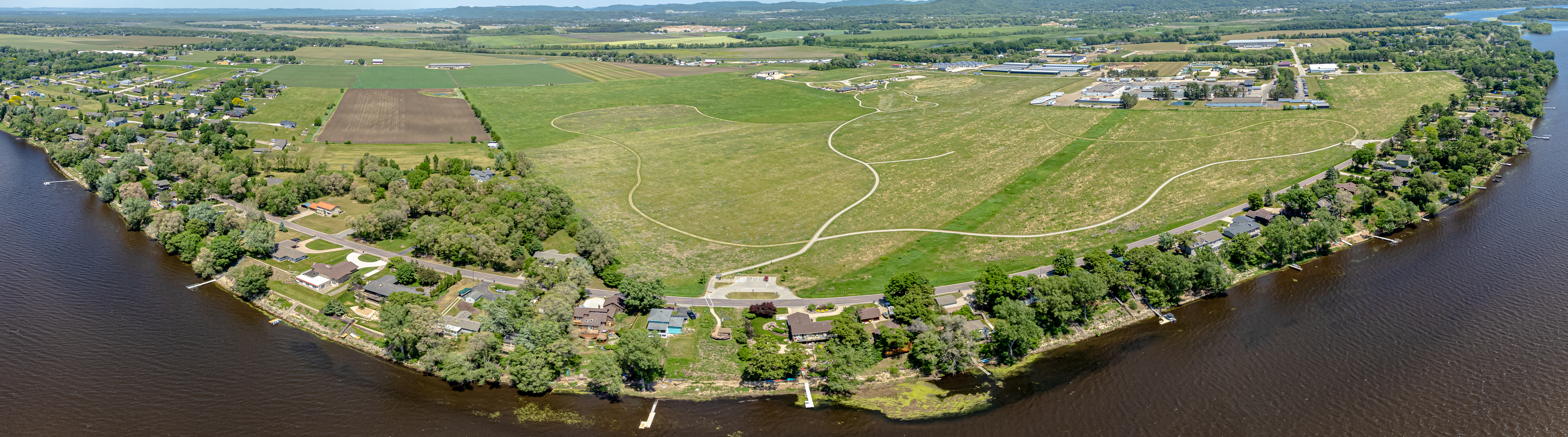
Brice Prairie

== Demographics ==
Historical population
Year	Pop.	±%
1990	1,031	—
2000	1,804	+75.0%
2010	1,887	+4.6%
2020	1,961	+3.9%

=== 2020 census ===
As of the 2020 census, Brice Prairie had a population of 1,961. The median age was 42.8 years. 22.5% of residents were under the age of 18 and 15.7% of residents were 65 years of age or older. For every 100 females there were 107.5 males, and for every 100 females age 18 and over there were 103.8 males age 18 and over.

55.8% of residents lived in urban areas, while 44.2% lived in rural areas.

There were 751 households in Brice Prairie, of which 31.6% had children under the age of 18 living in them. Of all households, 66.6% were married-couple households, 12.9% were households with a male householder and no spouse or partner present, and 13.7% were households with a female householder and no spouse or partner present. About 18.4% of all households were made up of individuals and 8.0% had someone living alone who was 65 years of age or older.

There were 800 housing units, of which 6.1% were vacant. The homeowner vacancy rate was 0.3% and the rental vacancy rate was 0.0%.

Racial composition as of the 2020 census
Race	Number	Percent
White	1,864	95.1%
Black or African American	6	0.3%
American Indian and Alaska Native	6	0.3%
Asian	5	0.3%
Native Hawaiian and Other Pacific Islander	0	0.0%
Some other race	4	0.2%
Two or more races	76	3.9%
Hispanic or Latino (of any race)	38	1.9%

=== 2000 census ===
As of the 2000 census, there were 1,804 people, 654 households, and 516 families residing in the CDP. The population density was 398.0 people per square mile (153.8/km^{2}). There were 691 housing units at an average density of 152.4/sq mi (58.9/km^{2}). The racial makeup of the CDP was 96.29% White, 0.28% African American, 1.50% Native American, 0.72% Asian, 0.22% from other races, and 1.00% from two or more races. 1.05% of the population were Hispanic or Latino of any race.

There were 654 households, out of which 41.1% had children under the age of 18 living with them, 68.8% were married couples living together, 5.8% had a female householder with no husband present, and 21.1% were non-families. 15.9% of all households were made up of individuals, and 5.0% had someone living alone who was 65 years of age or older. The average household size was 2.76 and the average family size was 3.08.

In the CDP, the population was spread out, with 29.2% under the age of 18, 6.3% from 18 to 24, 34.6% from 25 to 44, 23.6% from 45 to 64, and 6.3% who were 65 years of age or older. The median age was 35 years. For every 100 females, there were 106.4 males. For every 100 females age 18 and over, there were 102.5 males.

The median income for a household in the CDP was $49,303, and the median income for a family was $49,952. Males had a median income of $31,766 versus $23,472 for females. The per capita income for the CDP was $19,295. 3.8% of the population and 2.7% of families were below the poverty line. Out of the total population, 1.0% of those under the age of 18 and 11.6% of those 65 and older were living below the poverty line.

== Arts and culture ==
Brice Prairie holds an outdoor music festival the fourth Saturday in August. "Rockin' the Prairie" is held at the Brice Prairie 1st Responder building. Proceeds benefit Brice Prairie EMS and Rescue.

== Parks and recreation ==
The Upper Brice Prairie Landing and Mosey Landing offer access to Lake Onalaska and the Mississippi River. Lytles Landing is a canoe landing offering access to the Black River. The Great River State Bike Trail runs along Brice Prairie, and the Midway Railroad Prairie State Natural Area encompasses the eastern entrance to the prairie. Neighborhood parks are in residential areas, including Swarthout Park.

== Infrastructure ==
Brice Prairie is served by Brice Prairie EMS and Rescue and the Holmen Fire Department. Law enforcement coverage is provided by the La Crosse County Sheriff's Department, with mutual aid provided by the Onalaska Police Department and Holmen Police Department.
