= Holland, La Crosse County, Wisconsin =

Holland, Wisconsin
- Town
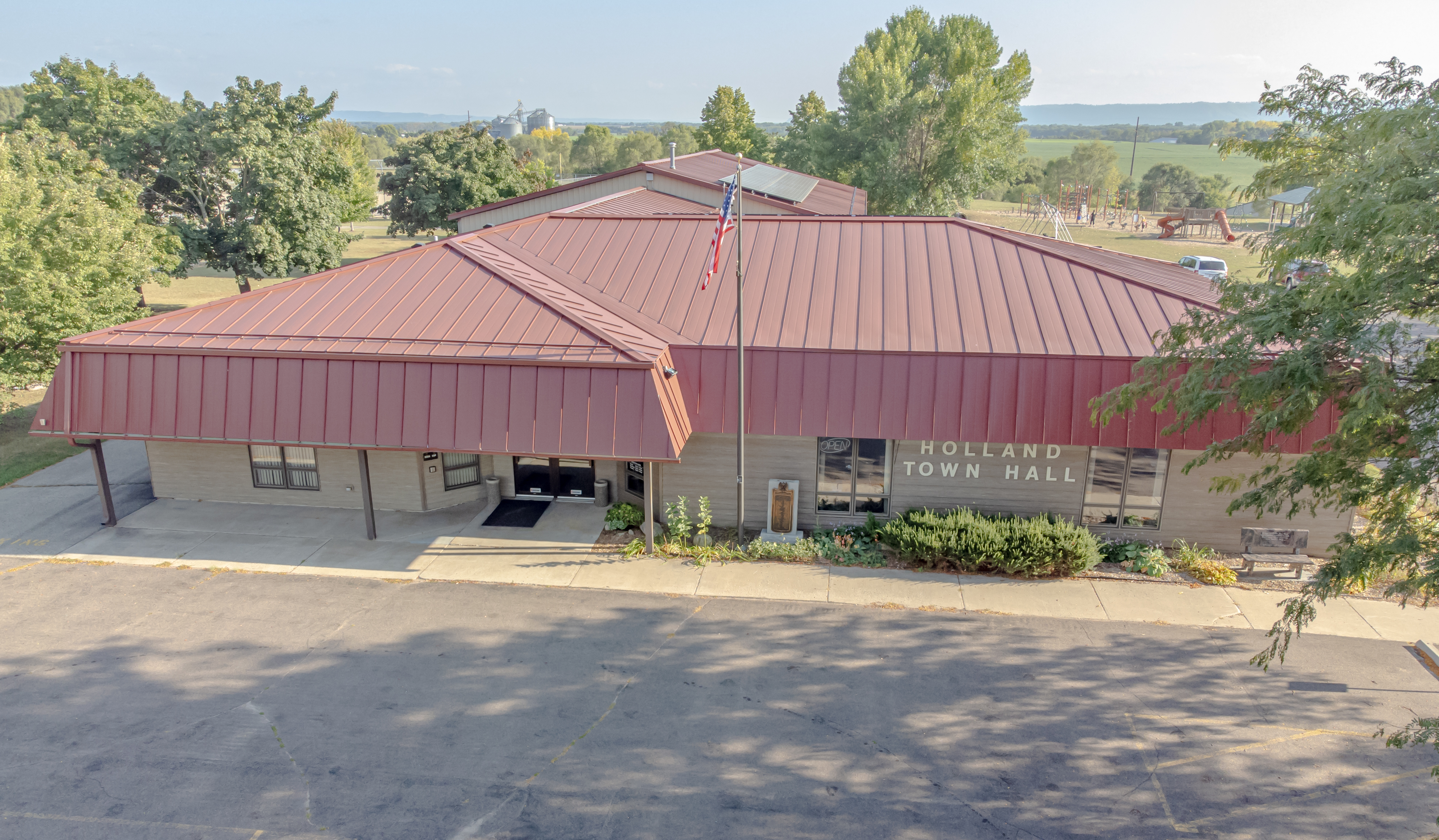
- Holland Town Hall

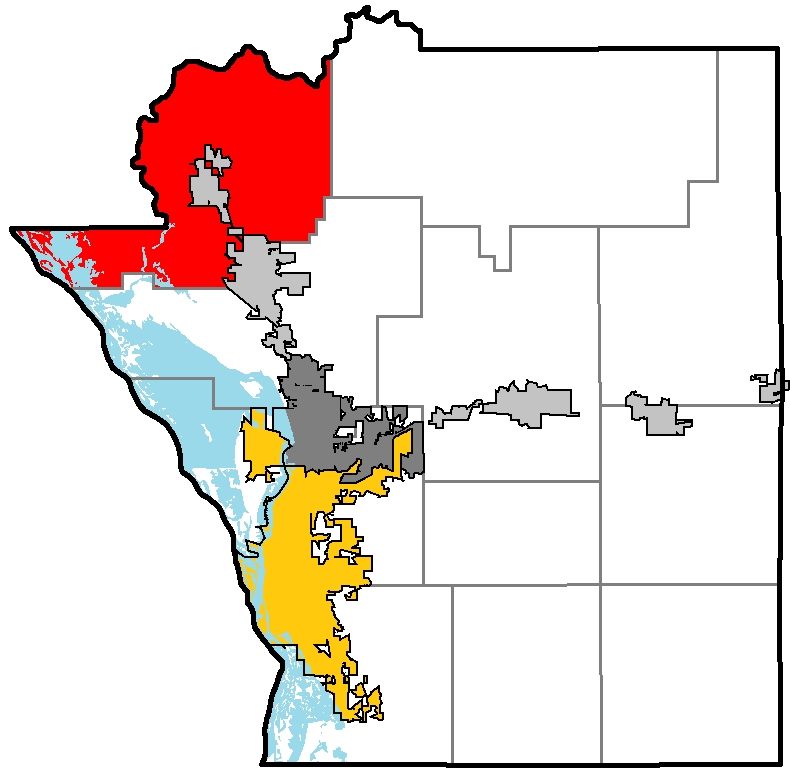
- Location of Holland, La Crosse County

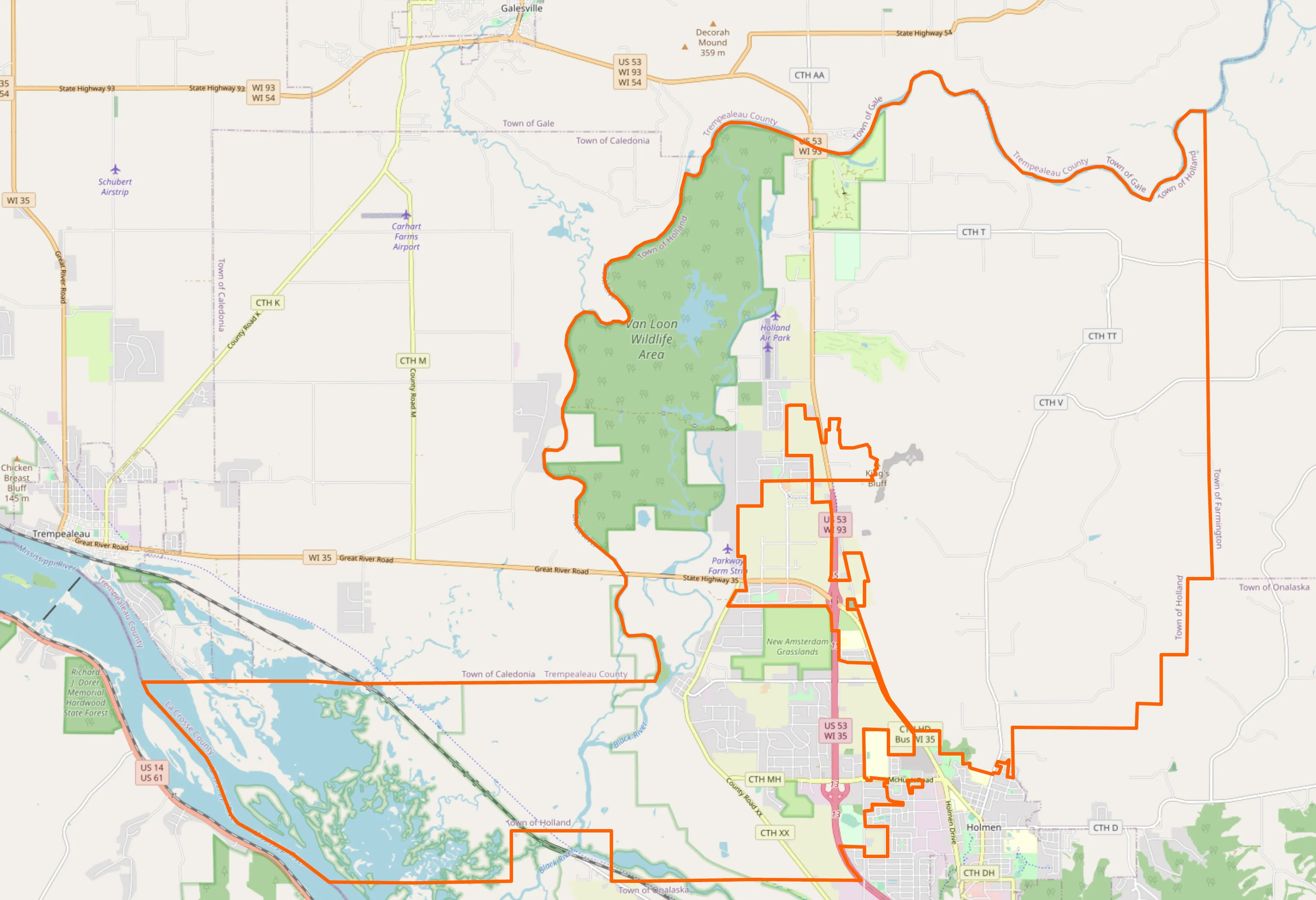
- Holland Town limits
- Coordinates: 43°59′16″N 91°17′57″W
- Country: United States
- State: Wisconsin
- County: La Crosse

Area
  - Total: 45.6 sq mi (118.2 km^{2})
  - Land: 42.5 sq mi (110.1 km^{2})
  - Water: 3.1 sq mi (8.1 km^{2})
- Elevation: 712 ft (217 m)

Population (2020)
  - Total: 4,530
  - Density: 107/sq mi (41.1/km^{2})
- Time zone: UTC-6 (Central (CST))
  - Summer (DST): UTC-5 (CDT)
- Area code: 608
- FIPS code: 55-35350
- GNIS feature ID: 1583401
- Website: https://www.townofhollandwi.gov/

Holland is a town in La Crosse County, Wisconsin, United States. The population was 4,530 at the 2020 census. It is part of the La Crosse, Wisconsin Metropolitan Statistical Area. The unincorporated community of Council Bay is located in the town.

== History ==
The town was originally settled by farmers from the Netherlands. An unincorporated community within the town limits is called New Amsterdam.

== Geography ==
According to the United States Census Bureau, the town has a total area of 45.6 square miles (118.2 km^{2}), of which 42.5 square miles (110.1 km^{2}) is land and 3.1 square miles (8.1 km^{2}) (6.86%) is water.

Holland lies to the north and west of the village of Holmen, Wisconsin.

== Demographics ==
Historical population
Year	Pop.	±%
1990	2,778	—
2000	3,042	+9.5%
2010	3,756	+23.5%
2020	4,530	+20.6%

As of the census of 2000, there were 3,042 people, 1,014 households, and 868 families residing in the town. The population density was 71.6 people per square mile (27.6/km^{2}). There were 1,054 housing units at an average density of 24.8 per square mile (9.6/km^{2}). The racial makeup of the town was 96.71% White, 0.07% African American, 0.20% Native American, 2.04% Asian, 0.03% Pacific Islander, 0.10% from other races, and 0.85% from two or more races. Hispanic or Latino of any race were 0.39% of the population.

There were 1,014 households, out of which 46.6% had children under the age of 18 living with them, 77.4% were married couples living together, 5.3% had a female householder with no husband present, and 14.3% were non-families. 10.7% of all households were made up of individuals, and 2.7% had someone living alone who was 65 years of age or older. The average household size was 3.00 and the average family size was 3.23.

In the town, the population was spread out, with 31.2% under the age of 18, 6.6% from 18 to 24, 32.3% from 25 to 44, 24.1% from 45 to 64, and 5.8% who were 65 years of age or older. The median age was 35 years. For every 100 females, there were 104.2 males. For every 100 females age 18 and over, there were 104.2 males.

The median income for a household in the town was $55,846, and the median income for a family was $57,383. Males had a median income of $39,353 versus $25,510 for females. The per capita income for the town was $20,126. About 3.6% of families and 4.2% of the population were below the poverty line, including 6.9% of those under age 18 and 2.2% of those age 65 or over.
