= Black River (Wisconsin) =

River in Wisconsin, United States

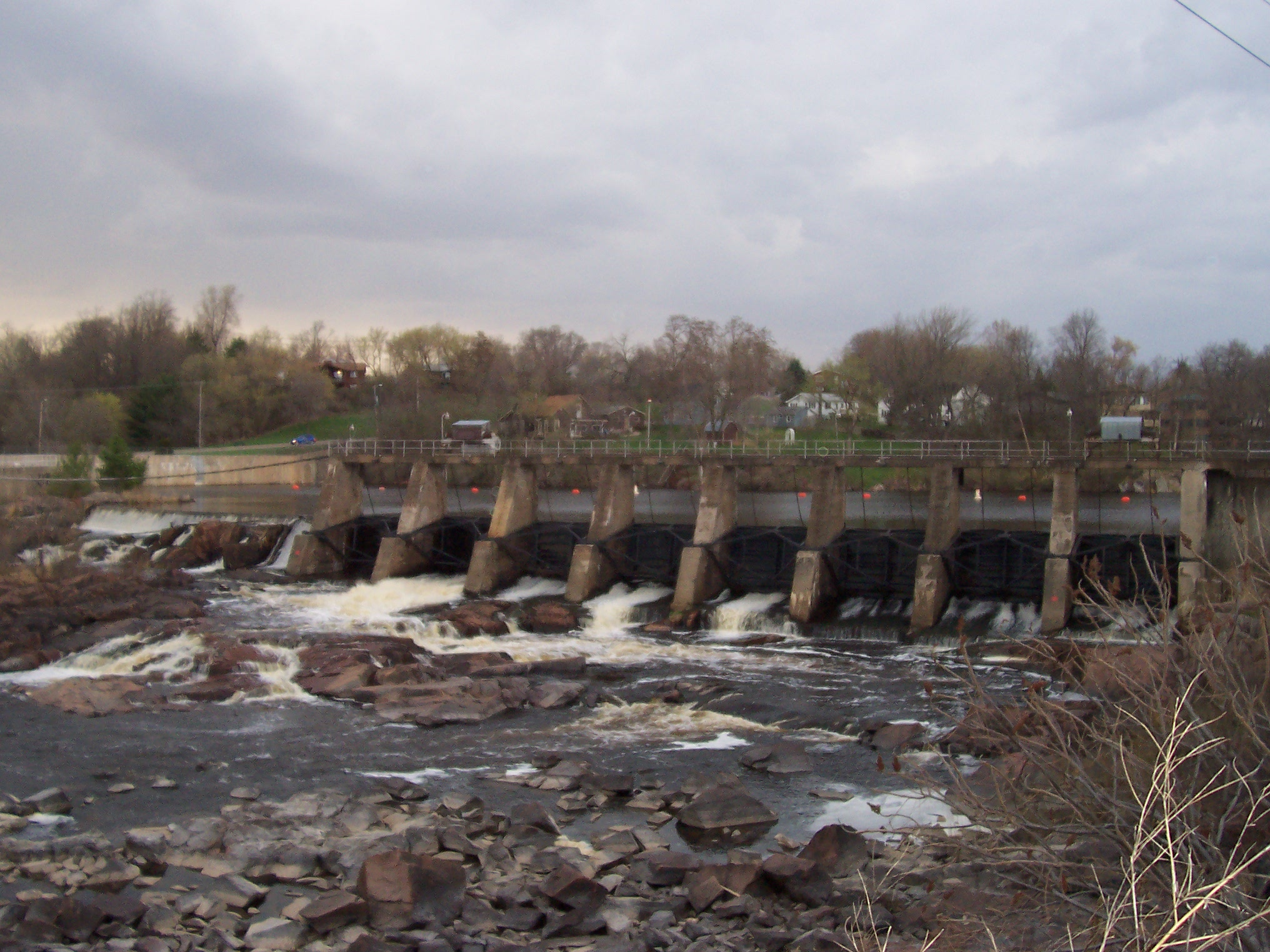
- Black River dam in Black River Falls

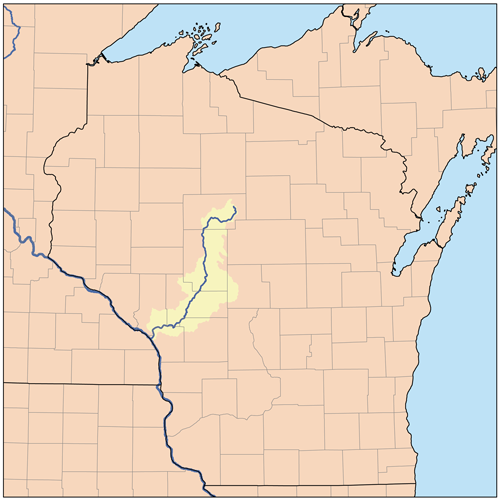
- Map of the Black River watershed

Physical characteristics
- Source
  - location: Black Lake, Taylor County, Wisconsin
- Mouth
  - location: Mississippi River in La Crosse, Wisconsin
  - elevation: 630 ft (190 m)
- Length: 190 miles (310 km)
- Basin size: Approximately 2,400 mi^{2} (6,200 km^{2})

Basin features
- River system: Mississippi River

The Black River is a river in west-central Wisconsin and a tributary of the Mississippi River. The river is approximately 190 miles (310 km) long. During the 19th century, pine logs were rafted down the Black, heading for sawmills at La Crosse and points beyond.

== Geography ==
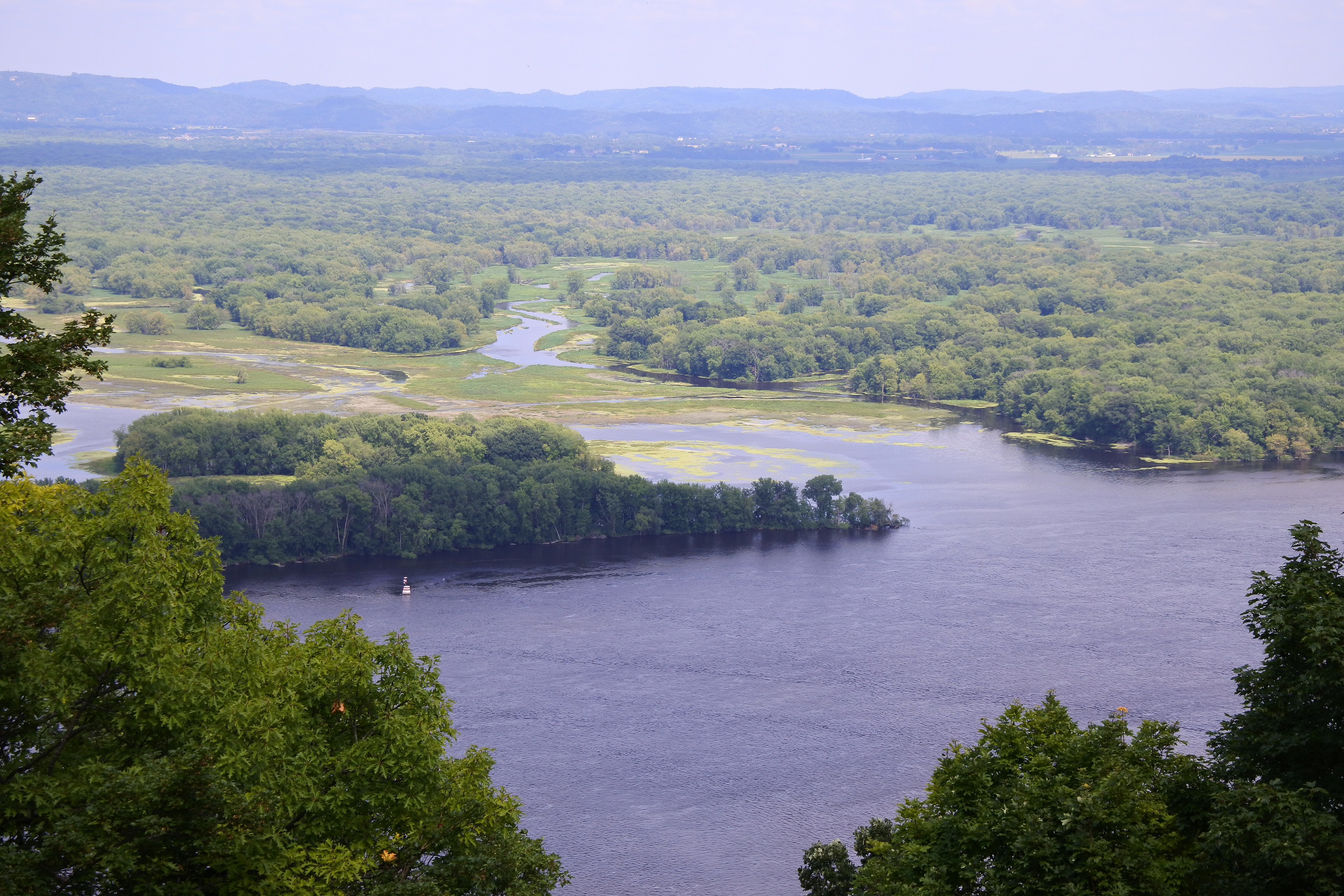
Delta of the Black River at the Mississippi River across from Great River Bluffs State Park, Minnesota.

The river begins in central Wisconsin, rising in Taylor County at 45°19′00″N 90°15′20″W approximately 2.5 miles (4.0 km) west of the village of Rib Lake. It flows south-southwest through Medford, Greenwood, Neillsville and Black River Falls. The Black River first mingles with the Mississippi River in Lake Onalaska in the Upper Mississippi River National Wildlife and Fish Refuge. The lower 10 miles (16 km) of the river channel have been absorbed by Lake Onalaska, an impoundment of the Mississippi River formed by Lock and Dam No. 7 at Onalaska. The river exits Lake Onalaska through a channel between French Island and the city of Onalaska and rejoins the Mississippi River at 43°49′12″N 91°15′26″W, northwest of La Crosse.

The Black River can be divided into two sections by the dam at Black River Falls. The upstream section averages 6.6 feet/mile gradient, while the lower section through the Driftless Area only averages 1.7 feet/mile gradient. An additional distinction is that the upper section has a substrate predominantly rocky and soil that contributes tannin, while the lower section has a predominantly sandy substrate. The tannin content of the water is the source of the river's name.

The East Fork Black River rises in Wood County at 44°35′26″N 90°17′49″W, southwest of Marshfield and flows 57.5 miles (92.5 km) south and west into Lake Arbutus on the Black River at 44°25′50″N 90°41′41″W.

The Little Black River is formed by the confluence of the East and West Branches at 45°07′51″N 90°16′00″W and flows into the Black River at 45°06′39″N 90°20′57″W south of Medford. The West Branch Little Black River rises at 45°15′59″N 90°15′07″W, south of Rib Lake and less than 2 miles (3.2 km) from the source of the main branch of the Black River. The East Branch Little Black River rises at 45°14′45″N 90°10′49″W south of Rib Lake.

== History ==
The earliest mention of the Black River may be in 1661, when a French Jesuit priest reported that a band of Huron Indians had taken refuge near its headwaters, where they were starving. The priest, René Ménard, tried to reach them from Lake Superior by canoe, but disappeared somewhere in the wilderness.

At the time of the 1837 Treaty of St. Peters, the Ojibwe dominated the upper Black. The lower Black generally formed the border between the Lakota to the west and the Ho-Chunk to the east. That treaty opened up northern Wisconsin for logging. At that time, the lower Black flowed through a mosaic of oak and other hardwood. But the upper Black flowed through prime pinelands, particularly in what would become Clark County. Before lumbering, the Black River is estimated to have drained 7% of Wisconsin's pinelands.

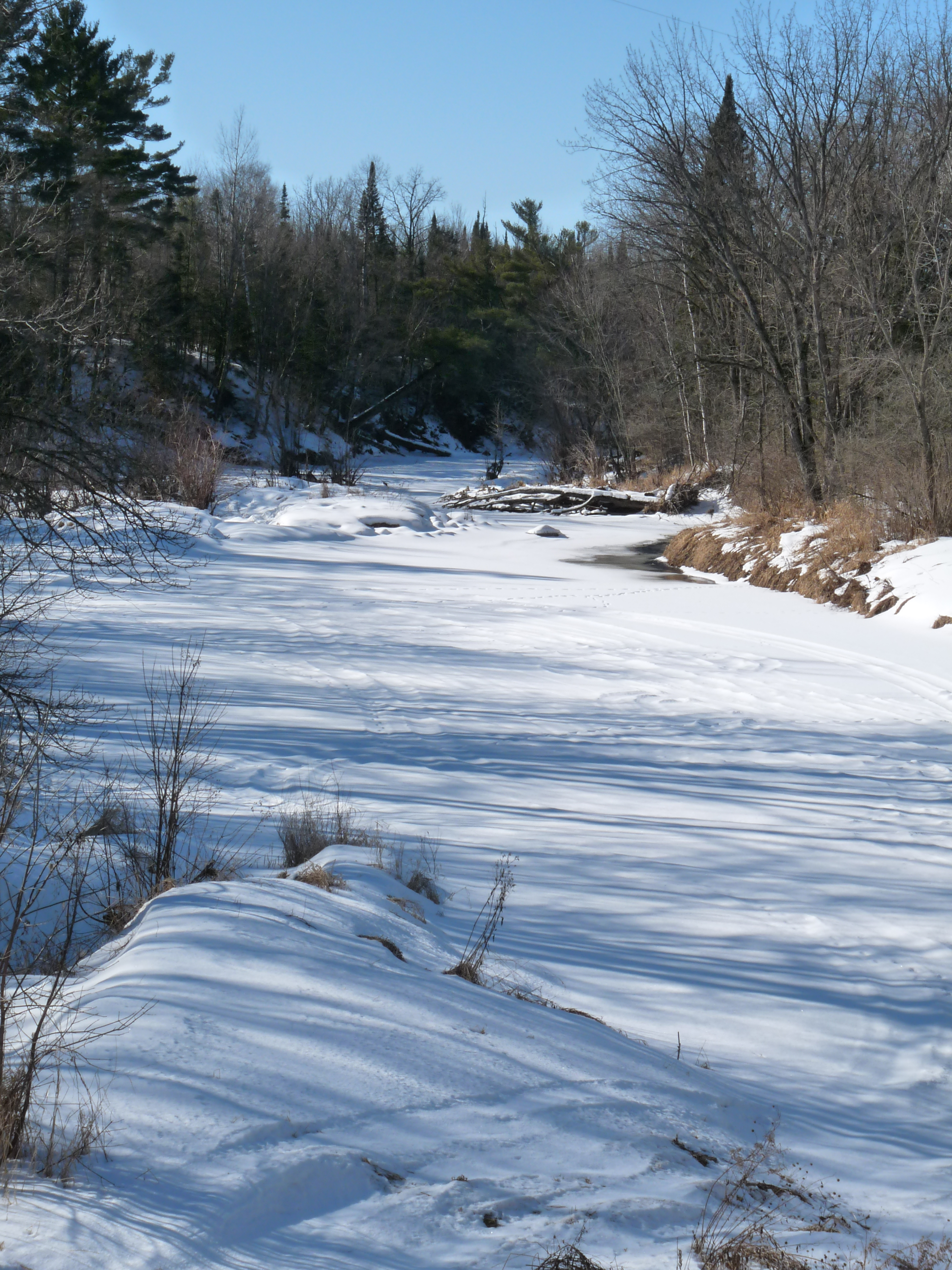
The Black freezes over in winter and snowmobilers run on the ice. (Looking downstream from the highway 64 bridge in the Chequamegon National Forest west of Medford.)

In 1839, Jacob Spaulding and Robert and Andrew Wood led an expedition from Prairie du Chien up the Mississippi and the Black into the forest and built a sawmill at the future site of Black River Falls. In 1841 a group of Mormons from Nauvoo, Illinois came up the Black and began cutting logs around Black River Falls. In 1842 they floated a raft of their logs down the Black and Mississippi to Nauvoo, demonstrating the feasibility of this transport. The lumber was used to construct the Nauvoo Temple and the Nauvoo House. By 1847, thirteen mills on the Black River produced over 6 million board feet of lumber. Sawmills on the Black contributed to the growth of Neillsville, Black River Falls, and La Crosse. By 1872 the Black produced 300 million board feet of lumber per year.

The river has also been used to transport coal and petroleum products.

=== Crossings ===
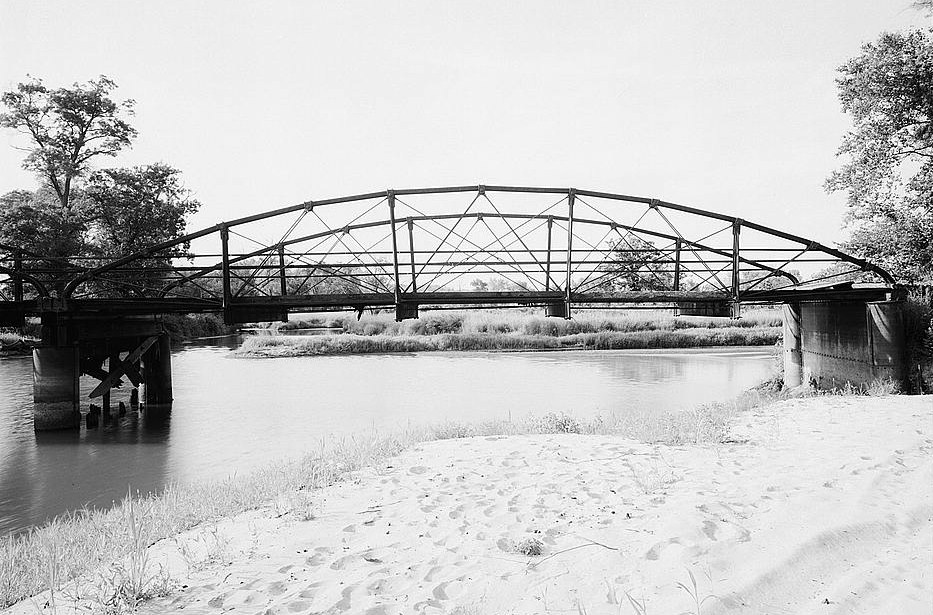
Bridge No. 4 of seven

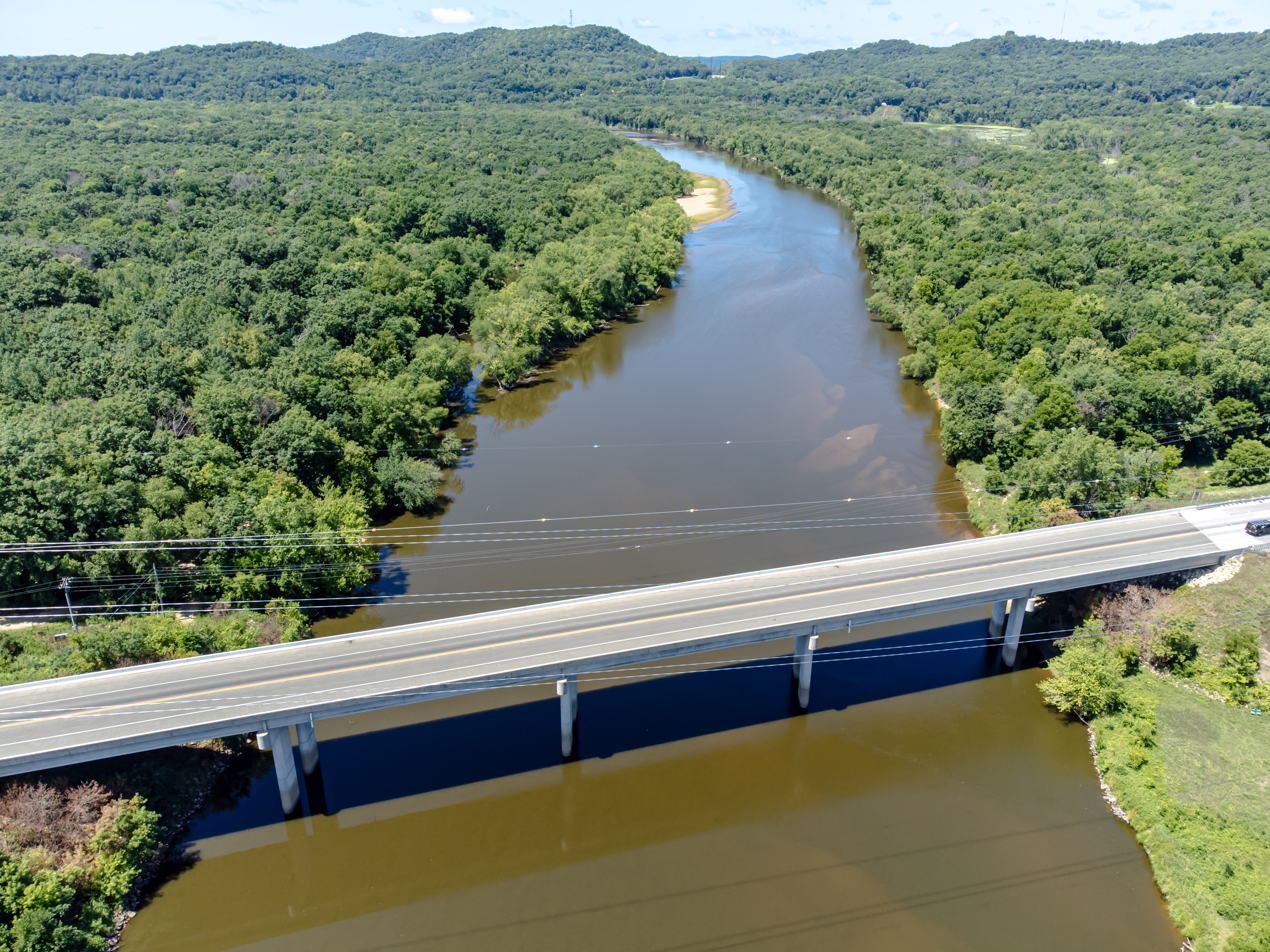
U.S. 53 Black River bridge near Galesville, Wisconsin. The Black River is a large part of the boundary between La Crosse County and Trempealeau County.

A ferry operated by Alex McGilvray crossed the river near La Crosse, starting in 1861. This was supplanted by a series of seven bowstring truss bridges were built during 1891-92 to bring a La Crosse County road through backwaters of the Black River and then cross the Black River itself, connecting the city of La Crosse with rural Trempealeau County.
