= New Amsterdam, Wisconsin =

- Unincorporated community
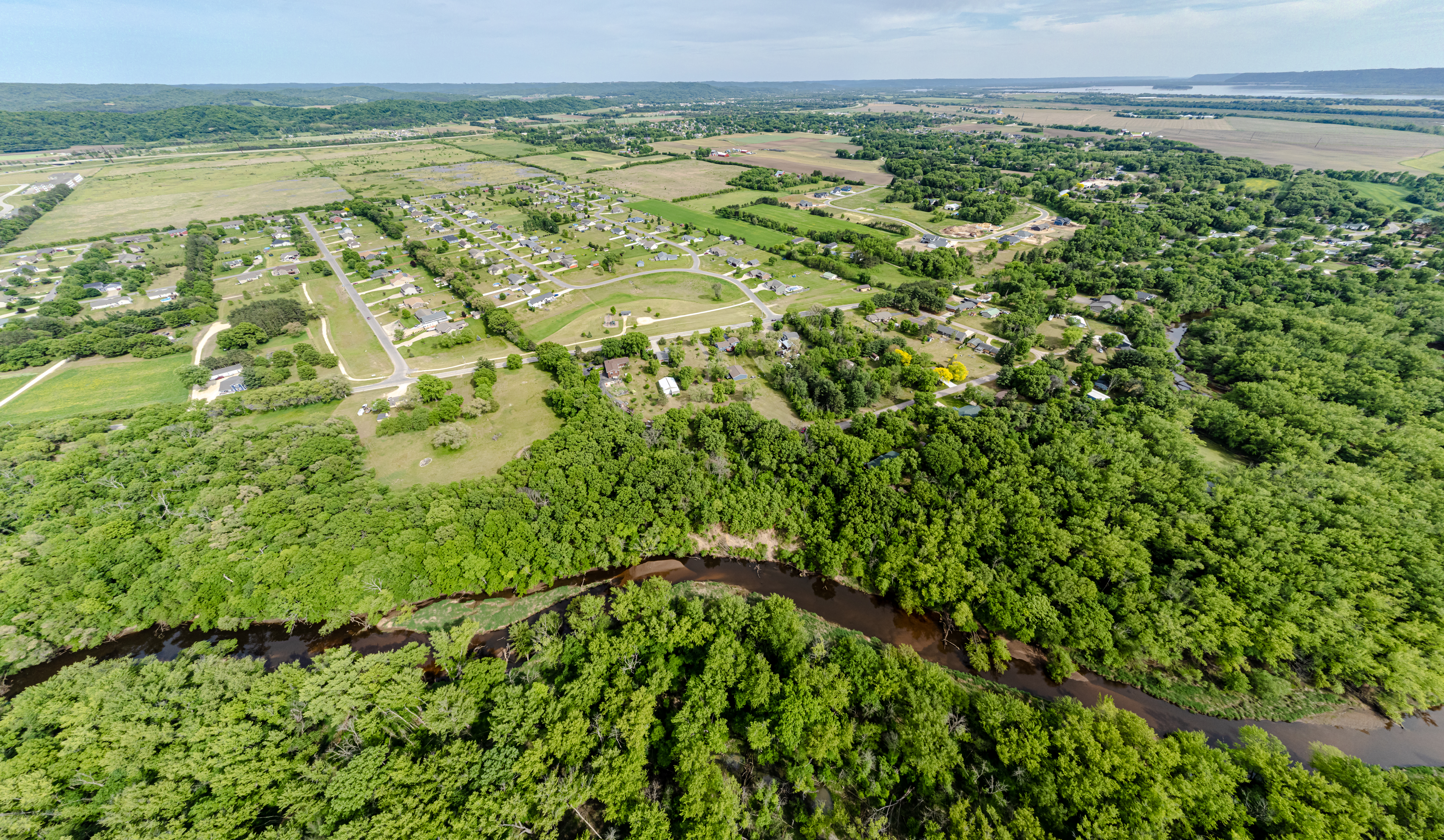
- New Amsterdam to the right and the Town of Holland is to the left

- Location within Wisconsin Location within the United States
- Coordinates: 43°58′58″N 91°19′00″W
- Country: United States
- State: Wisconsin
- County: La Crosse
- Town: Holland
- Elevation: 679 ft (207 m)
- Time zone: UTC-6 (Central (CST))
  - Summer (DST): UTC-5 (CDT)
- Area code: 608
- GNIS feature ID: 1570198

New Amsterdam is an unincorporated community located in the town of Holland, in La Crosse County, Wisconsin, United States.

== History ==
86 original Dutch settlers settled in the area in 1853. The town steadily expanded in the 1850s, seeing a post office in 1855 and its first town hall meeting in 1858.
