= Midway, Wisconsin =

- Unincorporated community
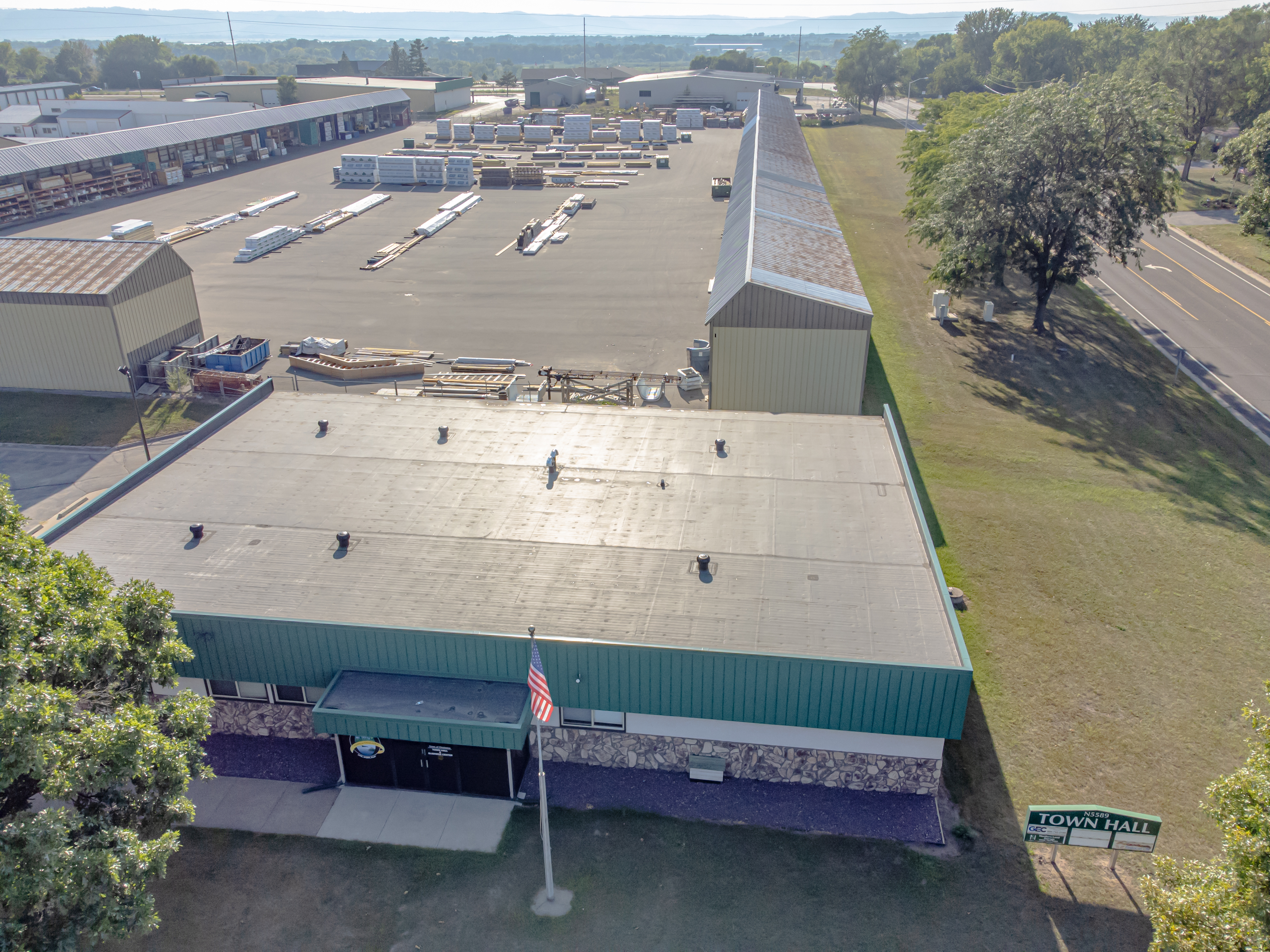
- Town of Onalaska Town Hall in Midway

- Location within Wisconsin Location within the United States
- Coordinates: 43°55′45″N 91°15′29″W
- Country: United States
- State: Wisconsin
- County: La Crosse
- Town: Onalaska
- Elevation: 656 ft (200 m)
- Time zone: UTC-6 (Central (CST))
  - Summer (DST): UTC-5 (CDT)
- Area code: 608
- GNIS feature ID: 1569446

Midway is an unincorporated community located in the town of Onalaska, La Crosse County, Wisconsin, United States.

== History ==
Midway was originally called "Halfway Creek", after a nearby creek; when a railroad depot was built the present name of Midway was adopted. The Midway post office closed in 1934.

In June 2013, the town of Onlaska voted to seek incorporation as a village and to call the new village "Midway". The Onalaska Town Hall is located in the unincorporated community of Midway.
