= French Island Generating Plant =

Electrical power station in La Crosse, Wisconsin

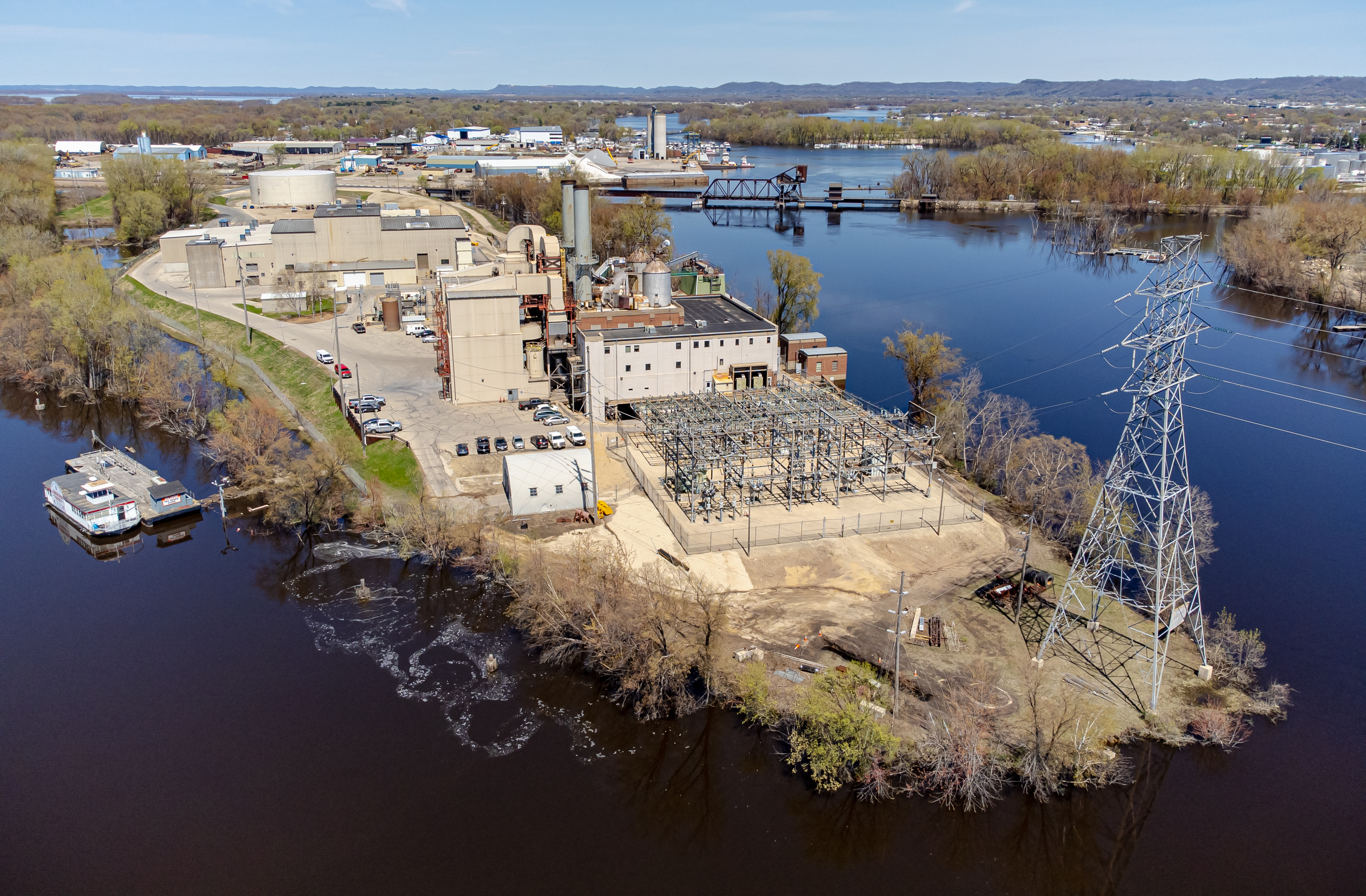
- Country: United States
- Location: French Island, Wisconsin
- Coordinates: 43°49′45″N 91°15′34″W
- Status: Operational
- Commission date: 1941
- Owner: Xcel Energy

Thermal power station
- Primary fuel: Refuse derived fuel, Wood fuel

Power generation
- Nameplate capacity: 228 MW

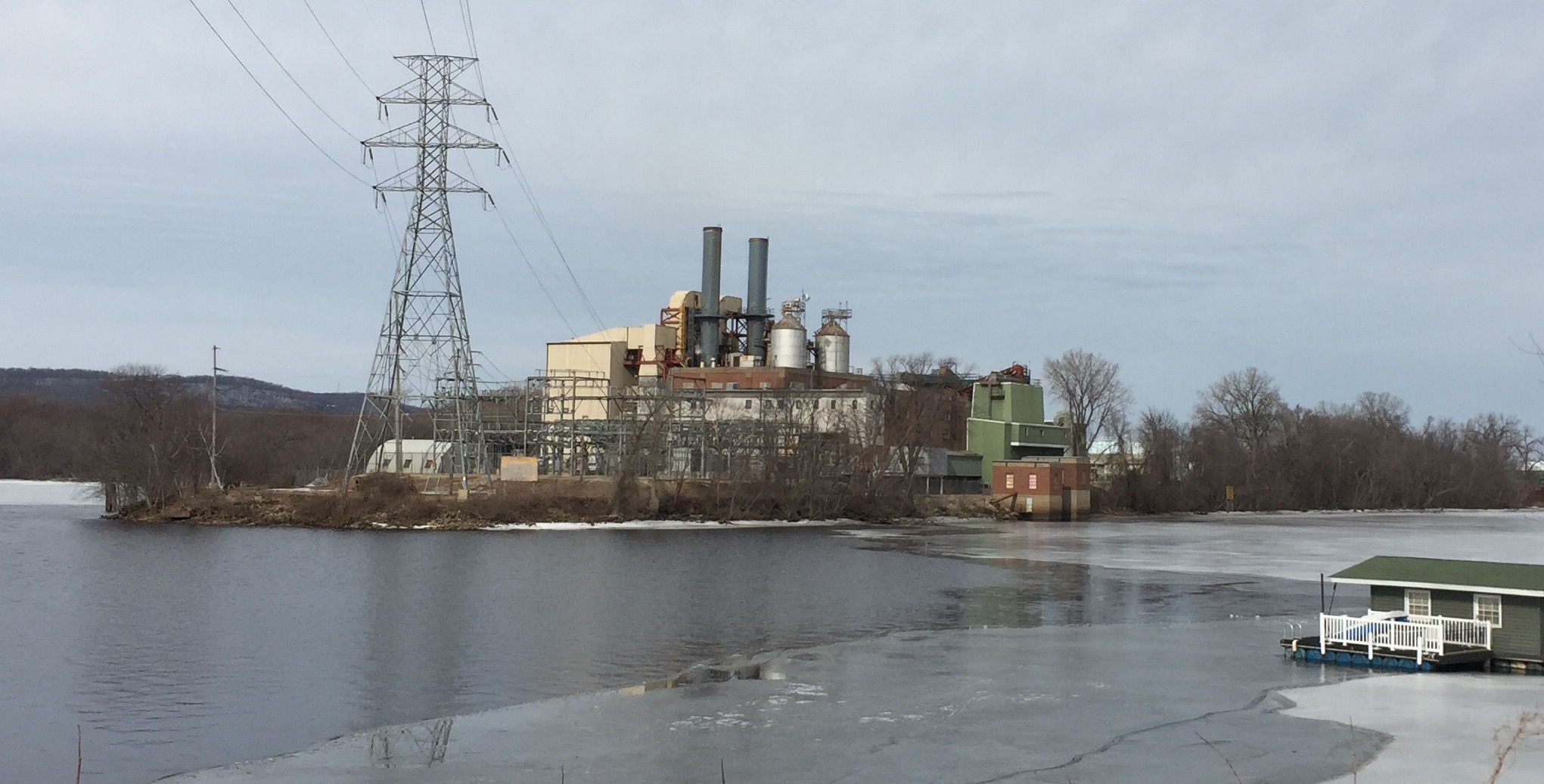

French Island Generating Plant is a waste fired electrical power station located on French Island in La Crosse, Wisconsin. Unit 1 and 2 are boiler / steam turbine units originally constructed in the 1940s operating on coal. They were converted to burn oil in the early 1970s. When oil became too costly, alternative fuels were used. Unit 2 was converted to burn waste wood in an Atmospheric Fluidized Bed Combustion Boiler in the early 1980s with unit 1 following in 1987.

== RDF ==
The two boiler units also burn Refuse derived fuel (RDF) diverting solid waste from the municipal landfill. The facility normally burns 50/50 mix of RDF and wood waste. The result of burning RDF is the release of dioxins and dioxin-like compounds into the air. Excessive dioxin releases have forced the shutdown of the boilers as recently as October 2007.

== Units ==
Unit	Capacity	Commissioning	Notes
1	14.3 MW	1940	Built for coal, converted to oil then to an Atmospheric Fluidized Bed Combustion Boiler in 1987
2	14 MW	1948	Built for coal, converted to oil then to an Atmospheric Fluidized Bed Combustion Boiler in 1981
3	100 MW (#2 fuel oil)	1974	Westinghouse Model 501B2 Simple Cycle Combustion Turbine
4	100 MW (#2 fuel oil)	1974	Westinghouse Model 501B2 Simple Cycle Combustion Turbine

== See also ==
- List of power stations in Wisconsin
