= Shelby (community), Wisconsin =

Shelby, Wisconsin
- Unincorporated community
- Location within Wisconsin Location within the United States
- Coordinates: 43°46′09″N 91°09′39″W
- Country: United States
- State: Wisconsin
- County: La Crosse
- Town: Shelby
- Elevation: 702 ft (214 m)
- Time zone: UTC-6 (Central (CST))
  - Summer (DST): UTC-5 (CDT)
- Area code: 608
- GNIS feature ID: 1574002

Shelby is an unincorporated community located in the town of Shelby, La Crosse County, Wisconsin, United States.

== History ==
The community was named for the first governor of Kentucky, Isaac Shelby. The first raising of the American flag in Wisconsin took place in this community when the fort located here was taken from the British.
