= Shelby, Wisconsin =

- Town
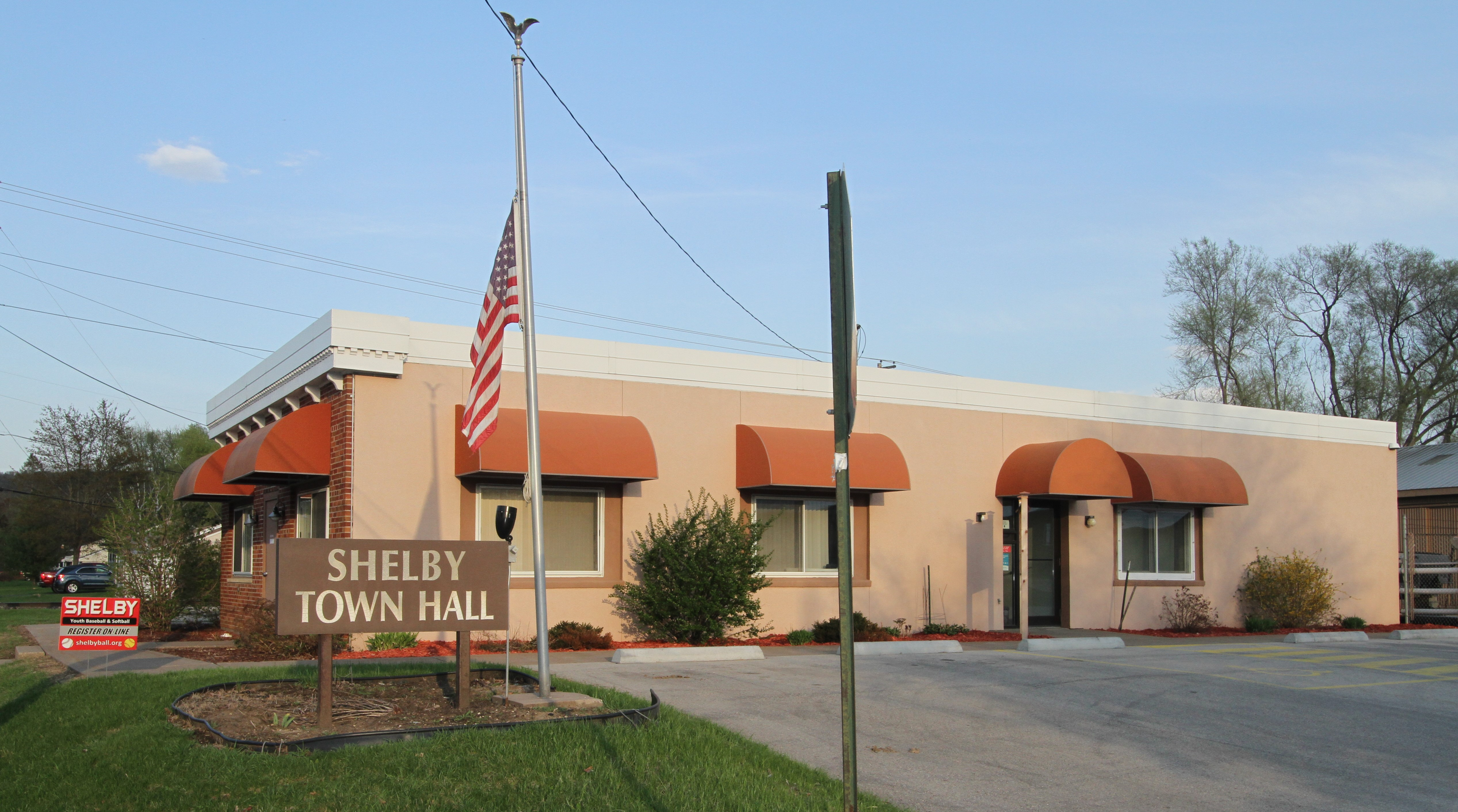
- Shelby Town Hall

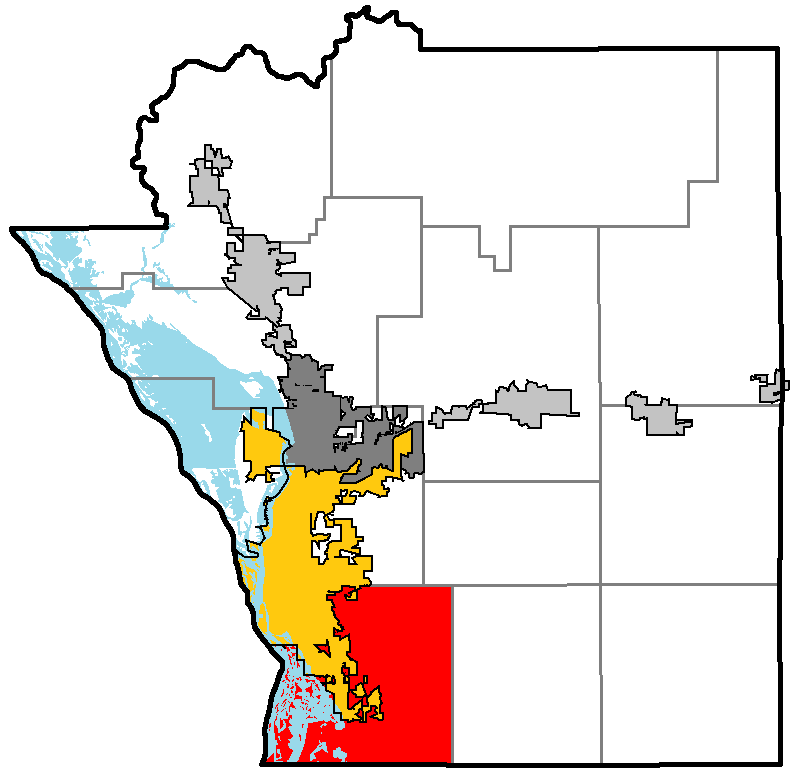
- Location of Shelby, La Crosse County

- Location of La Crosse County, Wisconsin
- Coordinates: 43°46′11″N 91°11′53″W
- Country: United States
- State: Wisconsin
- County: La Crosse

Area
  - Total: 29.1 sq mi (75.4 km^{2})
  - Land: 25.6 sq mi (66.2 km^{2})
  - Water: 3.6 sq mi (9.2 km^{2})
- Elevation: 692 ft (211 m)

Population (2020)
  - Total: 4,804
  - Density: 188/sq mi (72.6/km^{2})
- Time zone: UTC-6 (Central (CST))
  - Summer (DST): UTC-5 (CDT)
- Area code: 608
- FIPS code: 55-73125
- GNIS feature ID: 1584140
- Website: townofshelbywi.gov

Shelby is a town in La Crosse County, Wisconsin, United States. It is part of the La Crosse, Wisconsin Metropolitan Statistical Area. The population was 4,804 at the 2020 census. The unincorporated community of Shelby is located in the town.

== Geography ==
According to the United States Census Bureau, the town has a total area of 29.1 square miles (75.4 km^{2}), of which 25.6 square miles (66.3 km^{2}) is land and 3.5 square miles (9.2 km^{2}) (12.19%) is water.

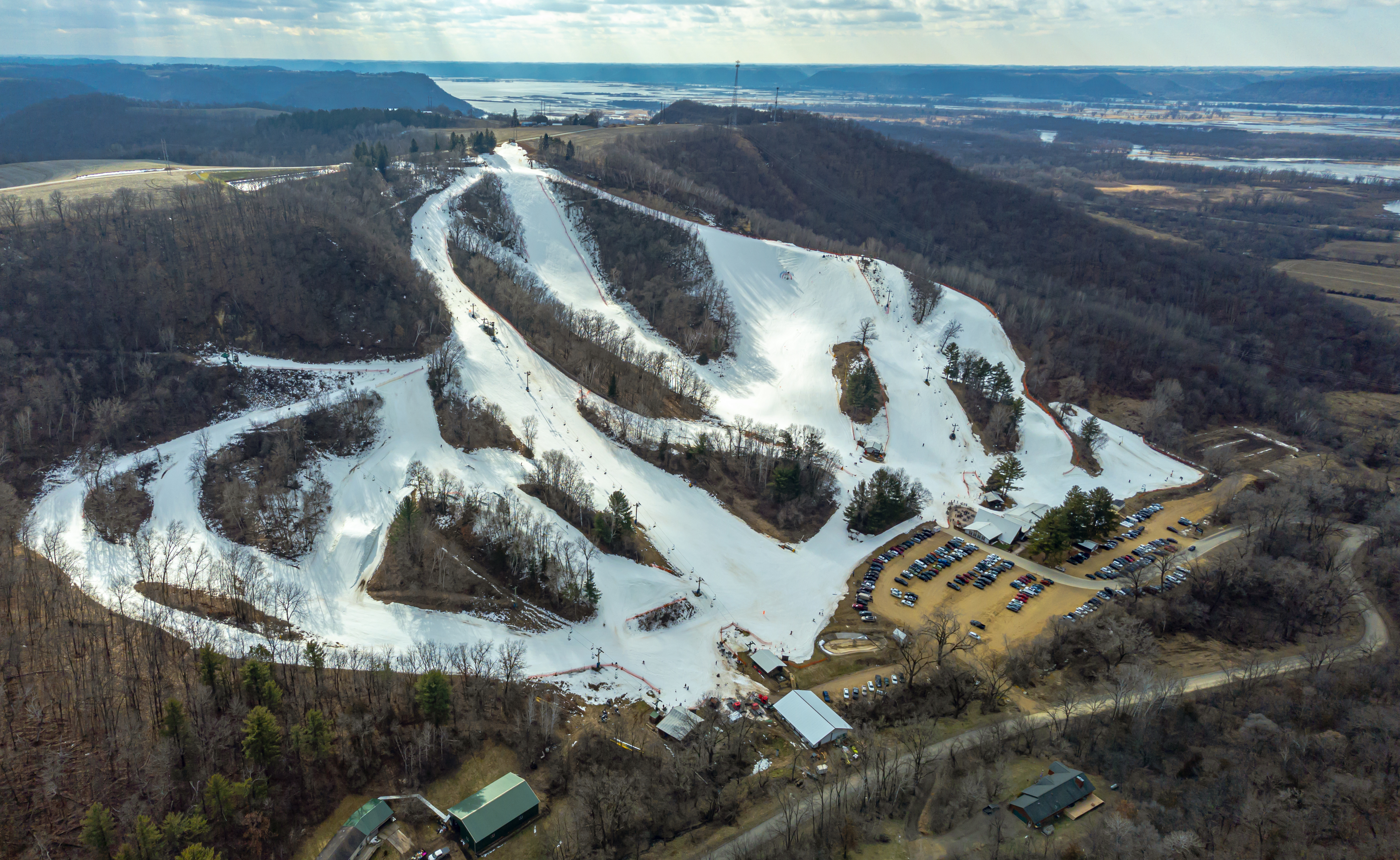
Mt. La Crosse on the edge of the south side of La Crosse, in the Town of Shelby

== Demographics ==
Historical population
Year	Pop.	±%
1990	4,435	—
2000	4,687	+5.7%
2010	4,715	+0.6%

According to 2009–2013 ACS estimates, the median household income was $75,742 and the median family income was $95,813. Males had a median income of $64,613 versus $45,208 for females. The per capita income for the town was $42,038. About 3.4% of families and 5.5% of the population were below the poverty line, including 7.1% of those under age 18 and 6.2% of those age 65 or over.

As of the census of 2000, there were 4,687 people, 1,771 households, and 1,397 families residing in the town. The population density was 183.2 people per square mile (70.7/km^{2}). There were 1,817 housing units at an average density of 71 per square mile (27.4/km^{2}). The racial makeup of the town was 96.89% White, 0.32% African American, 0.28% Native American, 1.69% Asian, 0.02% Pacific Islander, 0.11% from other races, and 0.7% from two or more races. Hispanic or Latino people of any race were 0.73% of the population.

There were 1,771 households, out of which 35.1% had children under the age of 18 living with them, 71% were married couples living together, 6% had a female householder with no husband present, and 21.1% were non-families. 18% of all households were made up of individuals, and 7.7% had someone living alone who was 65 years of age or older. The average household size was 2.65 and the average family size was 3.

In the town, the population was spread out, with 26.8% under the age of 18, 5% from 18 to 24, 23.6% from 25 to 44, 32.4% from 45 to 64, and 12.3% who were 65 years of age or older. The median age was 42 years. For every 100 females, there were 100.9 males. For every 100 females age 18 and over, there were 96.4 males.

The median income for a household in the town was $64,890, and the median income for a family was $76,559. Males had a median income of $50,313 versus $32,276 for females. The per capita income for the town was $32,899. None of the families and 1.1% of the population were living below the poverty line, including no under eighteens and 2.7% of those over 64.

== Transportation ==
Portions of the town have public transit service operated by the La Crosse MTU, as well as Scenic Mississippi Regional Transit.
