= West La Crosse, Wisconsin =

- Unincorporated community
- Location within Wisconsin Location within the United States
- Coordinates: 43°50′44″N 91°15′44″W
- Country: United States
- State: Wisconsin
- County: La Crosse
- Town: Campbell
- Elevation: 643 ft (196 m)
- Time zone: UTC-6 (Central (CST))
  - Summer (DST): UTC-5 (CDT)
- Area code: 608
- GNIS feature ID: 1576521

West La Crosse is an unincorporated community located in the town of Campbell, La Crosse County, Wisconsin, United States. It is part of the French Island census-designated place.
