= French Island, Wisconsin =

Census-designated place in Wisconsin, United States

- Village
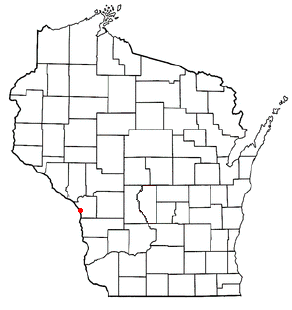
- Location of French Island, Wisconsin
- Coordinates: 43°51′48″N 91°15′41″W
- Country: United States
- State: Wisconsin
- County: La Crosse
- Village: French Island

Area
  - Total: 2.52 sq mi (6.53 km^{2})
  - Land: 2.02 sq mi (5.24 km^{2})
  - Water: 0.50 sq mi (1.29 km^{2})
- Elevation: 653 ft (199 m)

Population (2020)
  - Total: 4,284
  - Density: 2,117.4/sq mi (817.55/km^{2})
- Time zone: UTC-6 (Central (CST))
  - Summer (DST): UTC-5 (CDT)
- ZIP Code: 54603 (La Crosse)
- Area code: 608
- FIPS code: 55-27875
- GNIS feature ID: 2393013

French Island is a village and a census-designated place (CDP) in La Crosse County, Wisconsin, United States. As of the 2020 census, French Island CDP had a population of 4,284. It lies on an island of the same name, though they are not coextensive; a portion of the island is part of the city of La Crosse. All of the island is part of the La Crosse Metropolitan Statistical Area. French Island contains the entire population of the Village of French Island, because the balance of the village's territory is uninhabited.

== History ==
On October 1, 2025, the Town of Campbell submitted a request to incorporate as the Village of French Island.

On May 19, 2026, residents of the Town of Campbell voted in favor of incorporating as the Village of French Island by a margin of 1493 votes for a village and 30 against a village.

On May 21, 2026, the Village of French Island was officially incorporated by the Wisconsin Department of Administration.

== Geography ==
French Island is located in western La Crosse County. It is surrounded by waterways connected to the Mississippi River: French Slough, French Lake, and Lake Onalaska to the west, and the Black River and Richmond Bay to the east. Two parts of the dam forming Lake Onalaska on the Mississippi connect to French Island: one at the head of French Lake, and the other impounding the Black River.

The neighborhood of West La Crosse is in the southern part of the CDP.

According to the United States Census Bureau, the French Island CDP has a total area of 2.520 square miles (6.527 square kilometres), of which 2.022 square miles (5.237 square kilometres) are land and 0.498 square miles (1.290 square kilometres), or 19.76%, are water. The entire island's land area is 4.549 square miles (11.781 square kilometres).

== Demographics ==
Historical population
Year	Pop.	±%
2000	4,410	—
2010	4,207	−4.6%

As of the census of 2000, there were 4,410 people, 1,754 households, and 1,266 families residing in the CDP. The population density was 2,207.6 people per square mile (851.4/km^{2}). There were 1,823 housing units at an average density of 912.6/sq mi (351.9/km^{2}). The racial makeup of the CDP was 96.49% White, 0.52% African American, 0.52% Native American, 1.09% Asian, 0.02% Pacific Islander, 0.27% from other races, and 1.09% from two or more races. Hispanic or Latino of any race were 0.68% of the population.

There were 1,754 households, out of which 31.4% had children under the age of 18 living with them, 60.7% were married couples living together, 7.8% had a female householder with no husband present, and 27.8% were non-families. 21.6% of all households were made up of individuals, and 6.6% had someone living alone who was 65 years of age or older. The average household size was 2.51 and the average family size was 2.93.

In the CDP, the population was spread out, with 23.8% under the age of 18, 8.4% from 18 to 24, 27.3% from 25 to 44, 28.9% from 45 to 64, and 11.6% who were 65 years of age or older. The median age was 40 years. For every 100 females, there were 101.1 males. For every 100 females age 18 and over, there were 100.2 males.

The median income for a household in the CDP was $44,736, and the median income for a family was $55,439. Males had a median income of $37,165 versus $25,267 for females. The per capita income for the CDP was $20,741. About 4.6% of families and 5.1% of the population were below the poverty line, including 8.0% of those under age 18 and 1.5% of those age 65 or over.

== Economy ==
The French Island Generating Plant is located at the south end of French Island, within the La Crosse city limits.

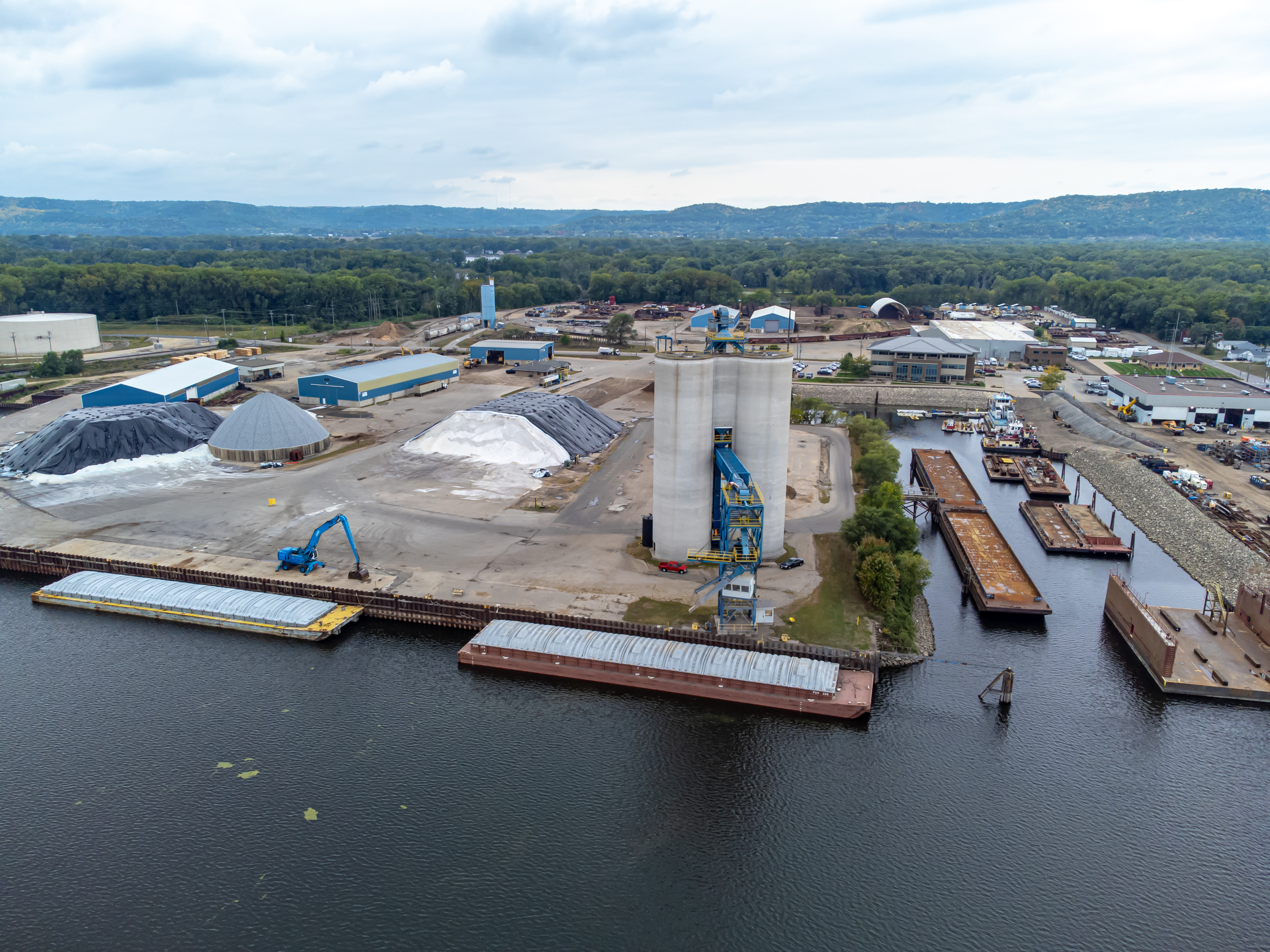
Cargill grain dock

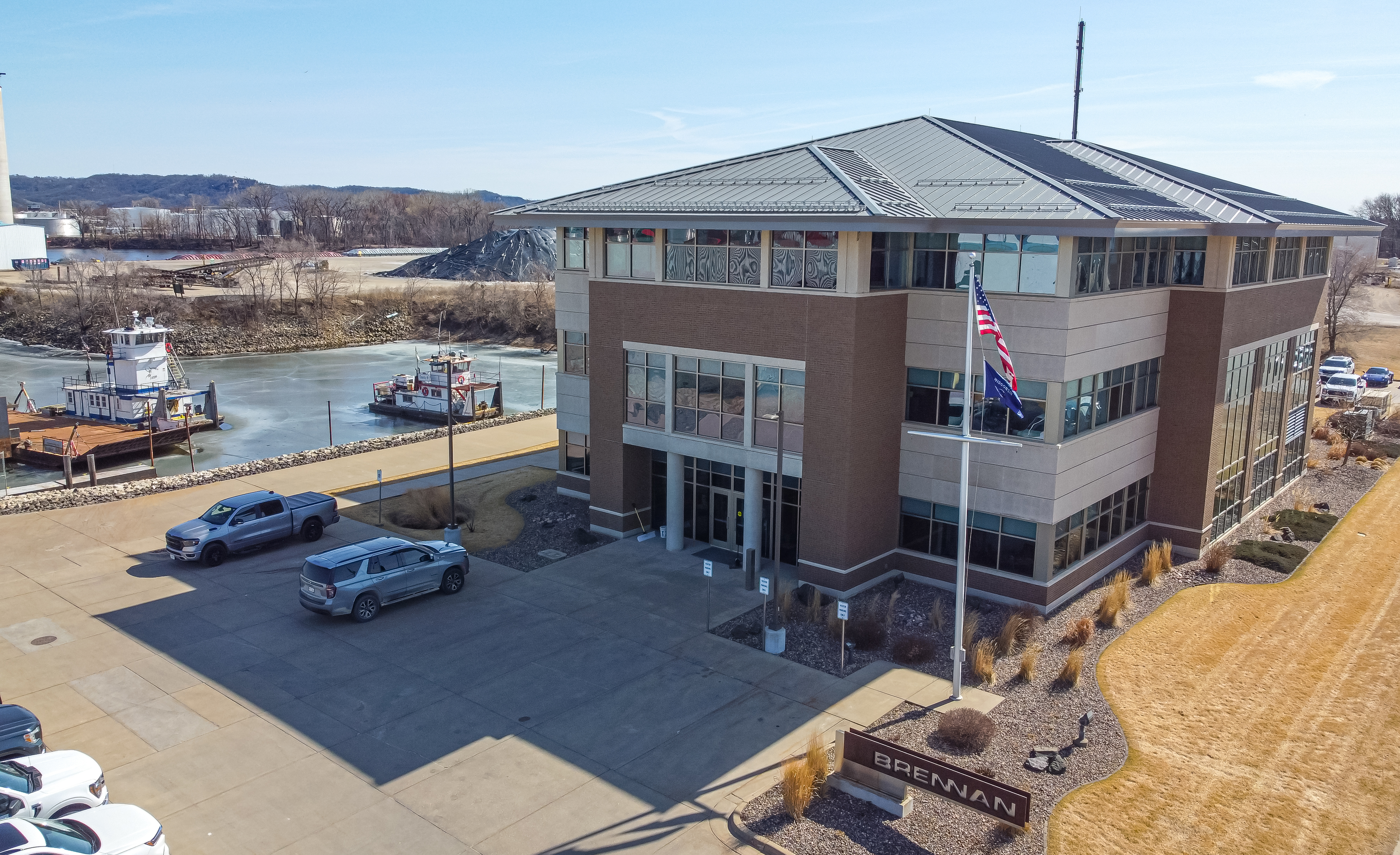
Brennan Marine

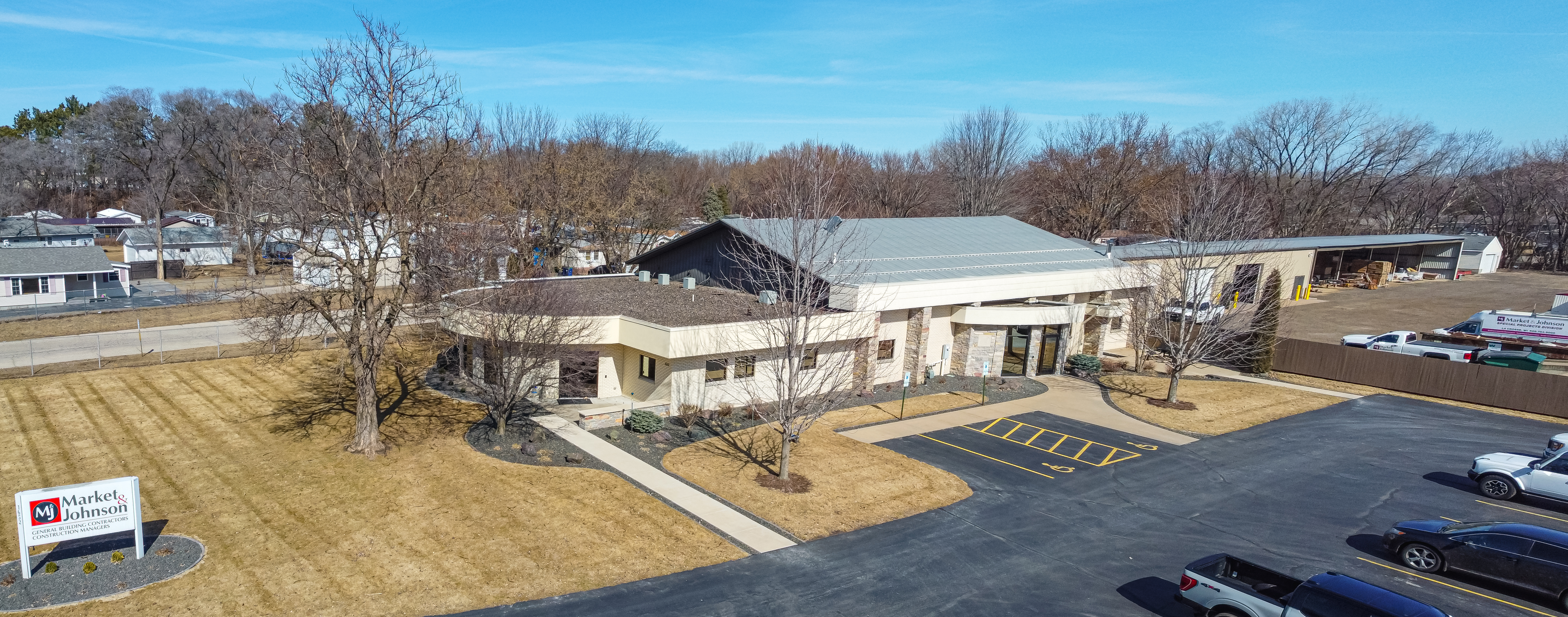
Market & Johnson

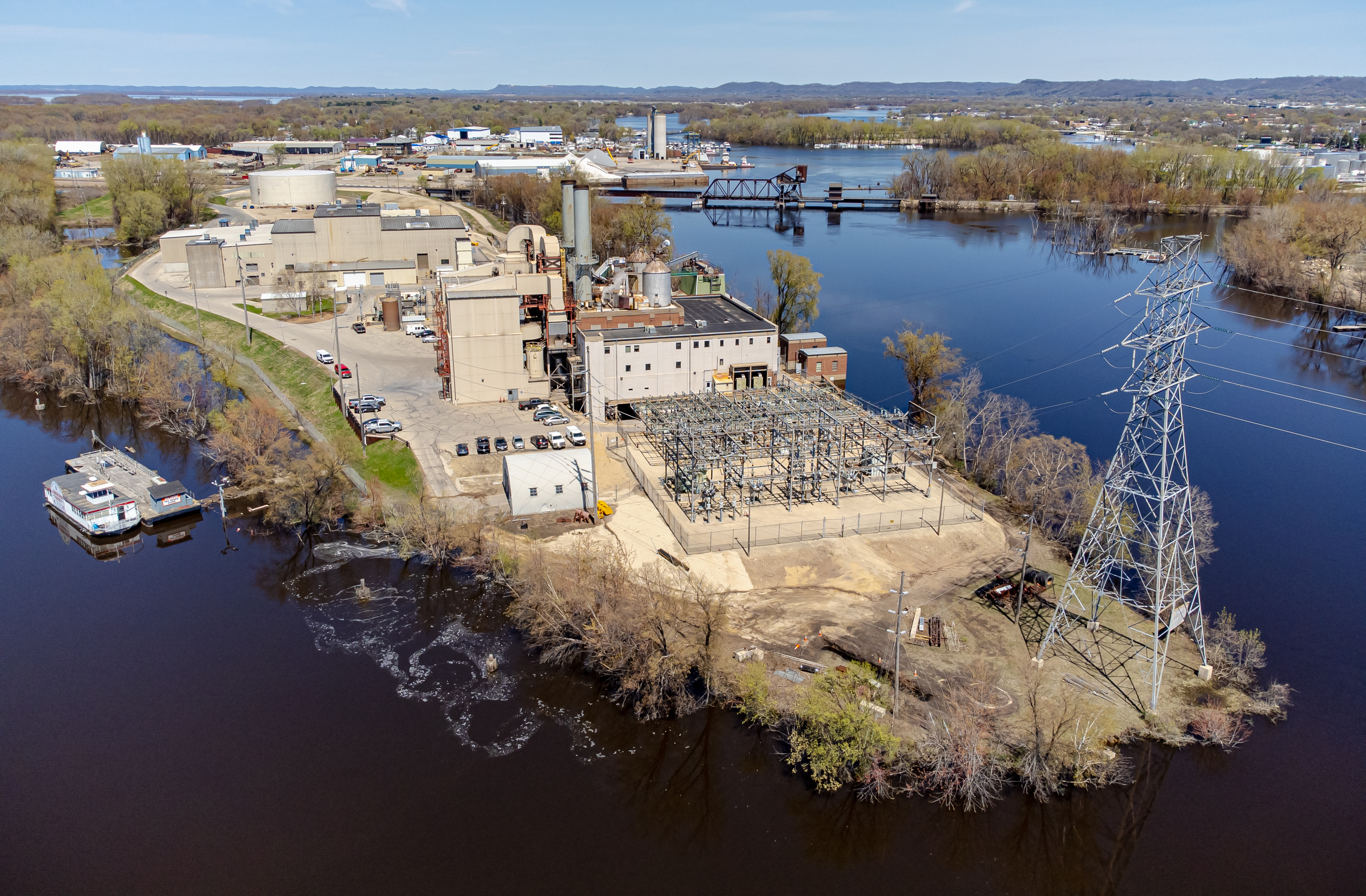
French Island incinerator

== Transportation ==
The island is accessible from the mainland by automobile, by way of the I-90 Mississippi River Bridge and from North La Crosse via the Clinton Street Bridge at the extreme southern end of the island. There is another bridge about four miles downstream, the La Crosse West Channel Bridge, which connects Barron Island to La Crescent, Minnesota.

La Crosse MTU provides bus service from French Island to North La Crosse.

The La Crosse Regional Airport occupies the northern part of French Island and is within the La Crosse city limits.

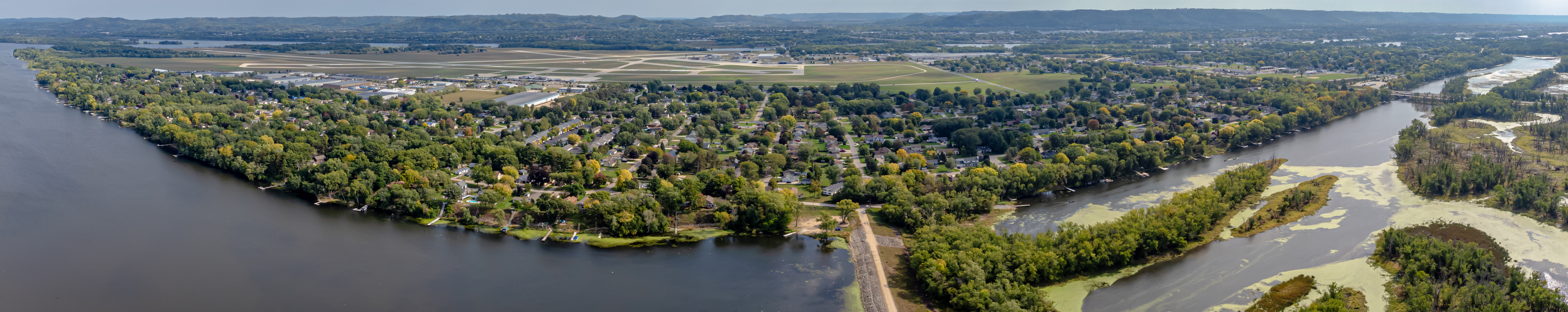
West side of French Island from Lake Onalaska

== Notable people ==
- Dan Kapanke, businessman and politician
- Ron Kind, lawyer and politician

== See also ==
- List of islands of the United States
- Washington Island and Madeline Island, other populated islands in Wisconsin

== Other soures ==
- French Island (island): Census Tract 103, La Crosse County, Wisconsin; French Island CDP, Wisconsin United States Census Bureau
