= Lake Onalaska =

Reservoir

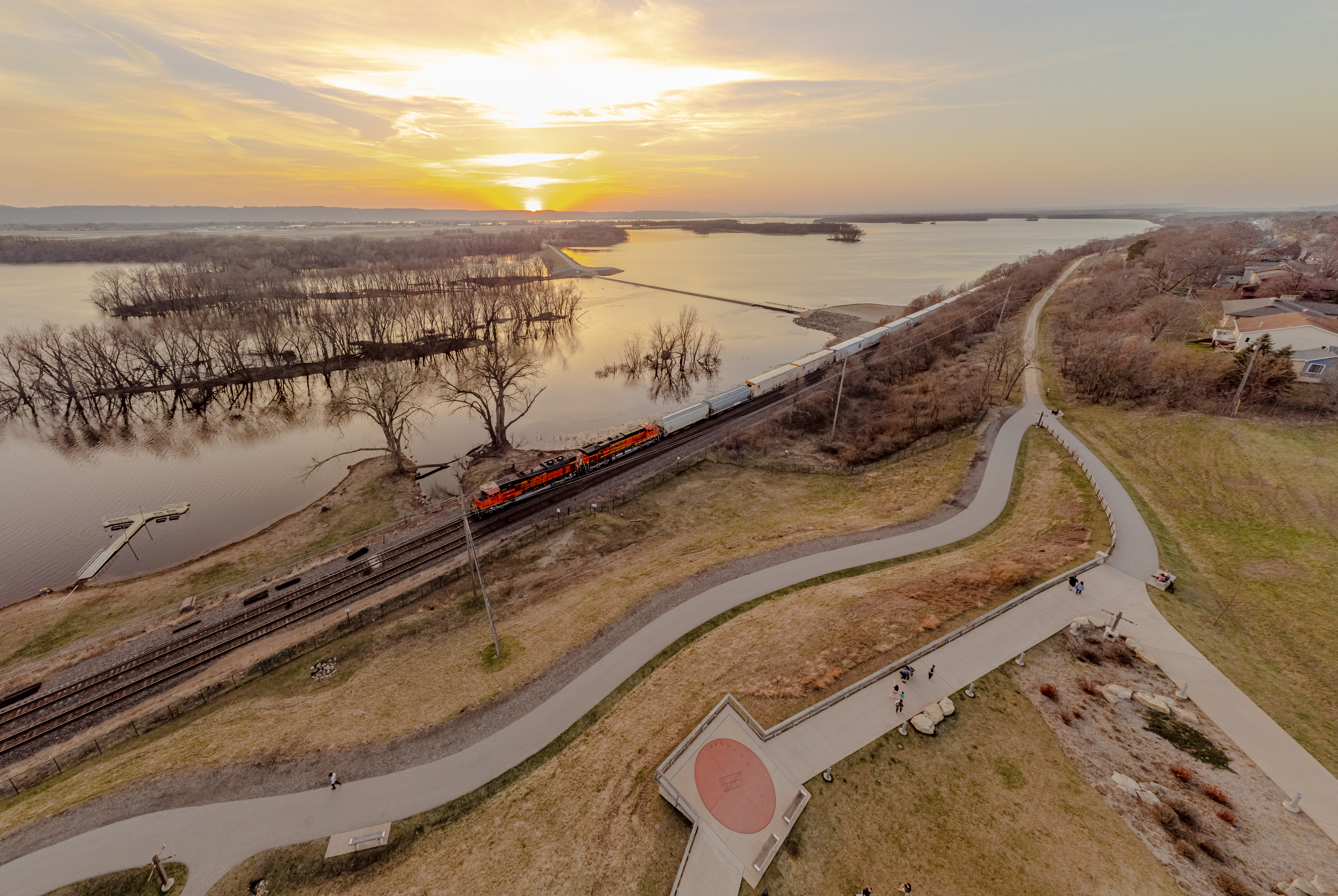
- Lake Onalaska spillway between Onalaska and French Island

- Location within Wisconsin Location within the United States
- Location: La Crosse County, Wisconsin, United States
- Coordinates: 43°52′01″N 091°18′26″W
- Type: reservoir
- Primary inflows: Mississippi River
- Primary outflows: Mississippi River
- Basin countries: United States
- Max. length: 4 mi (6.4 km)
- Max. width: 3.75 mi (6.04 km)
- Surface area: 7,688 acres (3,111 ha)
- Max. depth: 43 ft (13 m)
- Surface elevation: 633 ft (193 m)
- Settlements: Onalaska

Lake Onalaska is a reservoir located on the Black River and Mississippi River between Wisconsin, and Minnesota. It is approximately 4 miles (6.4 km) across, and is the widest point on the Mississippi River. Located in La Crosse County in the state of Wisconsin, its latitude and longitude are 43°52′01″N 091°18′26″W. The lake is 7,688 acres (31.11 km^{2}) and is shored by the city from which its name came from: Onalaska, Wisconsin. It sits at an altitude of 633 feet (193 m) and is 43 feet (13 m) deep at its deepest.

== History ==
Thomas G. Rowe (New York) and John C. Laird (Pennsylvania) platted the village of Onalaska, together, in 1851. The village, located in a heavy river-access area, became important in the lumber industry. According to local legend, the name of Onalaska comes from the 1799 poem The Pleasures of Hope, by the Scottish poet Thomas Campbell, which makes one mention of "Oonalaska's shore" in a passage about the remote reaches of a sailor's explorations. "Oonalaska" was an alternative spelling for Unalaska Island in Russian Alaska, one of the principal Aleutian Islands. Early settler Harvey Hubbard recounted that the poem was one of Thomas Rowe's favorites, leading him to choose the name. However, local historian George Tabbert argued that the name was more likely inspired by the story of a Lenape woman named Onalaska who died around 1780 in what is now Richland County, Ohio. By the 1840s, the woman's name was used in a variety of places, including a New York ferryboat that Rowe would likely have been familiar with.

In the 1930s, as a series of Lock and Dam systems were being implemented throughout the Upper Mississippi area, Lock and Dam No. 7 was built to dam the Black River, creating the reservoir Lake Onalaska.

The name for Lake Onalaska is derived from the name of the village (now city) of Onalaska and the rural town of Onalaska, both of which border the shores of the lake. Lake Roosevelt and Lake Leisure were, at one time, both considered possible names for what is now known as Lake Onalaska.

== Today ==
Lake Onalaska is a popular upper Mississippi destination that attracts visitors year round. Summer visitors enjoy a variety of activities from waterskiing, boating, windsurfing, fishing to beach picnics and bird-watching. The lake contains a variety of migratory waterfowl, and fish, including Northern Pike, Bluegill, Crappie, Walleye and Large and Smallmouth Bass.

The LaCrosse Sailing Club is on the most northern tip of French Island, which is at the south end of the Lake.

In the fall, the bluffs surrounding the Mississippi River and Lake Onalaska explode into rich tones of reds and golds, drawing tourists from across the country.

In the winter, when the lake freezes over and the ice fishing season begins, Lake Onalaska is often dotted with dozens of tents. And when the ice is right, there may be ice boats sailing.

In 2018, the Wisconsin state record Spotted sucker was caught in Lake Onalaska. It was 20.5 inches (52 cm) long and weighed 4 pounds 10.2 ounces (2.10 kg).

The Raptor Resource Project is located in Decorah, Iowa. They host a livestreamed webcam called the Mississippi River Flyway Cam. It is at Lake Onalaska in the Upper Mississippi River National Wildlife and Fish Refuge. It shows migrating birds and river wildlife, including Bald Eagles, American White Pelicans, Sandhill Cranes, Caspian Terns, Cormorants and many species of ducks, gulls, and other waterfowl.

== Gallery ==
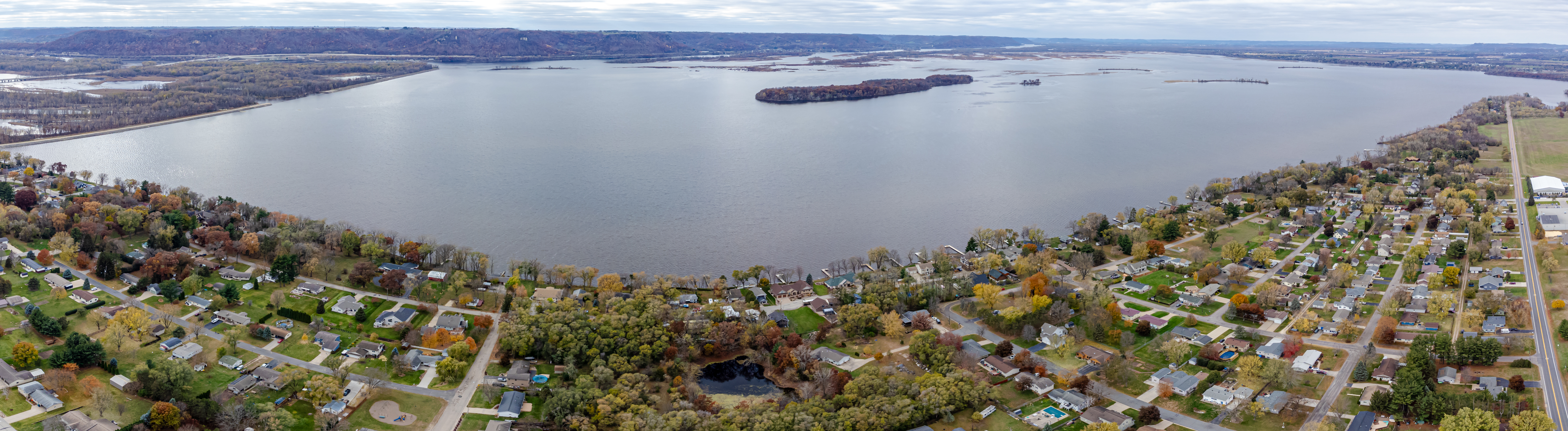
Lake Onalaska from French Island

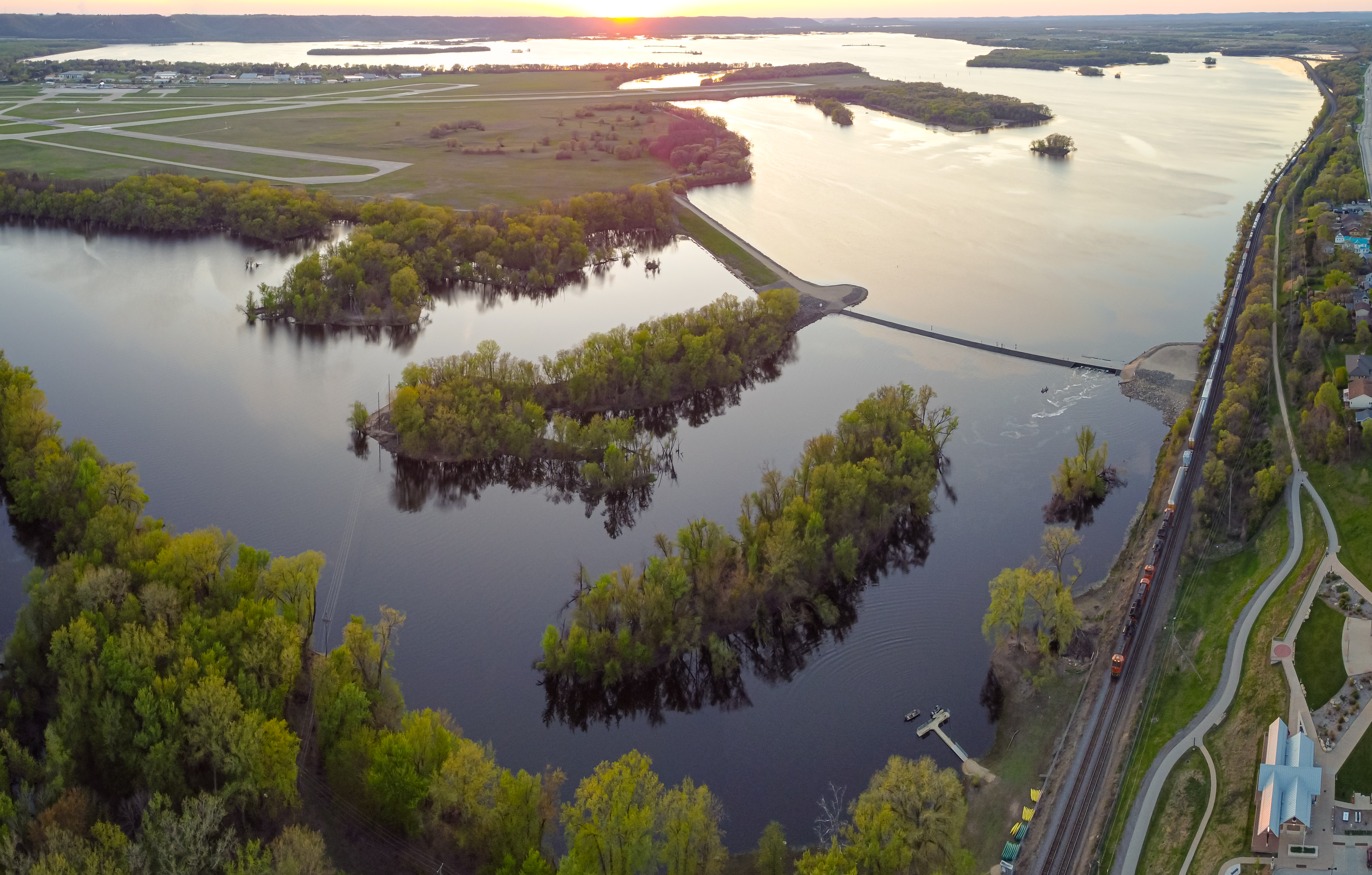
From Onalaska
