= La Crosse County, Wisconsin =

County in Wisconsin, United States

- County
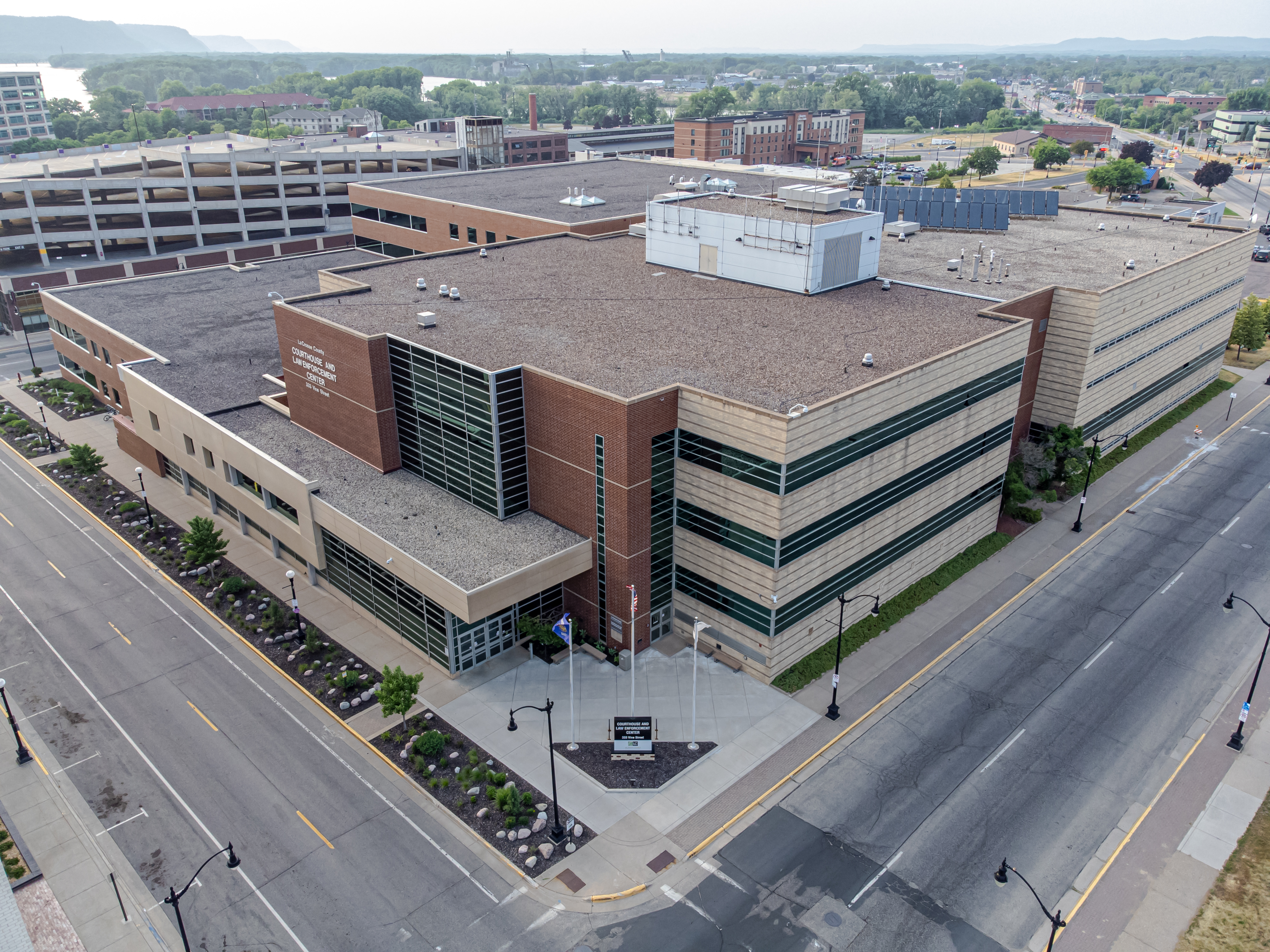
- La Crosse County Courthouse

- Seal

- Location within the U.S. state of Wisconsin
- Coordinates: 43°55′N 91°07′W
- Country: United States
- State: Wisconsin
- Founded: 1851
- Seat: La Crosse
- Largest city: La Crosse

Area
  - Total: 480 sq mi (1,200 km^{2})
  - Land: 452 sq mi (1,170 km^{2})
  - Water: 28 sq mi (73 km^{2}) 5.9%

Population (2020)
  - Total: 120,784
  - Estimate (2025): 121,339 ▲
  - Density: 267/sq mi (103/km^{2})
- Time zone: UTC−6 (Central)
  - Summer (DST): UTC−5 (CDT)
- Congressional district: 3rd
- Website: www.lacrossecounty.org

La Crosse County (/ləˈkrɒs/ lə-KROSS) is a county located in the U.S. state of Wisconsin. At the 2020 census, the county's population was 120,784. Its county seat is the city of La Crosse. La Crosse County is included in the La Crosse–Onalaska, WI–MN Metropolitan Statistical Area with a population of 170,341 and is the most populous county on Wisconsin's western border.

== Geography ==
According to the U.S. Census Bureau, the county has a total area of 480 square miles (1,200 km^{2}), of which 452 square miles (1,170 km^{2}) is land and 28 square miles (73 km^{2}) (5.9%) is water.

=== Major highways ===
- Interstate 90
- U.S. Highway 14
- U.S. Highway 53
- U.S. Highway 61
- Highway 16 (Wisconsin)
- Highway 33 (Wisconsin)
- Highway 35 (Wisconsin)
- Highway 108 (Wisconsin)
- Highway 157 (Wisconsin)
- Highway 162 (Wisconsin)

=== Railroads ===
- Amtrak
- BNSF
- Canadian Pacific
- La Crosse station

=== Buses ===
- La Crosse MTU
- Scenic Mississippi Regional Transit

=== Airport ===
- LSE – La Crosse Regional Airport

=== Adjacent counties ===
- Trempealeau County – northwest
- Jackson County – northeast
- Monroe County – east
- Vernon County – south
- Houston County, Minnesota – southwest
- Winona County, Minnesota – west

=== Climate ===
La Crosse County's location in the United States' upper midwest gives the area a temperate, continental climate. The warmest month of the year is July, when the average high temperature is 85.4 °F (29.7 °C), with overnight low temperatures averaging 27.4 °F (−2.6 °C). January is the coldest month, with high temperatures averaging 25.9 °F (−3.4 °C), with the overnight low temperatures around 10.5 °F (−11.9 °C).

Climate data for La Crosse Regional Airport, Wisconsin (1981–2010 normals, extremes 1872–present)
| Month | Jan | Feb | Mar | Apr | May | Jun | Jul | Aug | Sep | Oct | Nov | Dec | Year |
|---|---|---|---|---|---|---|---|---|---|---|---|---|---|
| Record high °F (°C) | 57 (14) | 65 (18) | 84 (29) | 93 (34) | 107 (42) | 102 (39) | 108 (42) | 105 (41) | 101 (38) | 93 (34) | 80 (27) | 67 (19) | 108 (42) |
| Mean maximum °F (°C) | 45.4 (7.4) | 50.5 (10.3) | 69.0 (20.6) | 82.2 (27.9) | 87.8 (31.0) | 93.6 (34.2) | 95.7 (35.4) | 94.0 (34.4) | 89.2 (31.8) | 80.6 (27.0) | 64.0 (17.8) | 48.1 (8.9) | 97.7 (36.5) |
| Mean daily maximum °F (°C) | 25.9 (−3.4) | 31.4 (−0.3) | 43.9 (6.6) | 59.3 (15.2) | 70.7 (21.5) | 80.0 (26.7) | 84.1 (28.9) | 81.5 (27.5) | 73.2 (22.9) | 59.9 (15.5) | 43.8 (6.6) | 29.1 (−1.6) | 57.0 (13.9) |
| Mean daily minimum °F (°C) | 8.9 (−12.8) | 13.6 (−10.2) | 25.2 (−3.8) | 37.9 (3.3) | 48.7 (9.3) | 58.5 (14.7) | 63.2 (17.3) | 61.3 (16.3) | 52.4 (11.3) | 40.4 (4.7) | 28.1 (−2.2) | 14.2 (−9.9) | 37.8 (3.2) |
| Mean minimum °F (°C) | −13.8 (−25.4) | −10.4 (−23.6) | 3.9 (−15.6) | 21.7 (−5.7) | 34.1 (1.2) | 44.6 (7.0) | 51.5 (10.8) | 49.3 (9.6) | 36.5 (2.5) | 25.4 (−3.7) | 12.0 (−11.1) | −8.7 (−22.6) | −18.4 (−28.0) |
| Record low °F (°C) | −43 (−42) | −36 (−38) | −28 (−33) | 7 (−14) | 26 (−3) | 33 (1) | 44 (7) | 35 (2) | 24 (−4) | 6 (−14) | −21 (−29) | −37 (−38) | −43 (−42) |
| Average precipitation inches (mm) | 1.12 (28) | 1.05 (27) | 2.04 (52) | 3.34 (85) | 3.52 (89) | 4.34 (110) | 4.26 (108) | 4.29 (109) | 3.56 (90) | 2.17 (55) | 2.01 (51) | 1.36 (35) | 33.06 (840) |
| Average snowfall inches (cm) | 10.7 (27) | 8.2 (21) | 7.1 (18) | 1.7 (4.3) | 0 (0) | 0 (0) | 0 (0) | 0 (0) | 0 (0) | 0.2 (0.51) | 4.1 (10) | 11.3 (29) | 43.3 (110) |
| Average precipitation days (≥ 0.01 in) | 9.1 | 8.0 | 9.8 | 11.2 | 11.9 | 11.5 | 10.4 | 9.8 | 9.6 | 9.3 | 9.0 | 9.2 | 118.8 |
| Average snowy days (≥ 0.1 in) | 7.8 | 6.4 | 4.3 | 1.2 | 0 | 0 | 0 | 0 | 0 | 0.3 | 3.1 | 7.0 | 30.1 |
Source: NOAA

== Demographics ==
Historical population
| Census | Pop. | Note | %± |
|---|---|---|---|
| 1860 | 12,186 | | — |
| 1870 | 20,297 | | 66.6% |
| 1880 | 27,073 | | 33.4% |
| 1890 | 38,801 | | 43.3% |
| 1900 | 42,997 | | 10.8% |
| 1910 | 43,996 | | 2.3% |
| 1920 | 44,355 | | 0.8% |
| 1930 | 54,455 | | 22.8% |
| 1940 | 59,653 | | 9.5% |
| 1950 | 67,587 | | 13.3% |
| 1960 | 72,465 | | 7.2% |
| 1970 | 80,468 | | 11.0% |
| 1980 | 91,056 | | 13.2% |
| 1990 | 97,904 | | 7.5% |
| 2000 | 107,120 | | 9.4% |
| 2010 | 114,638 | | 7.0% |
| 2020 | 120,784 | | 5.4% |
| 2025 (est.) | 121,339 | ▲ | 0.5% |
U.S. Decennial Census; 1790–1960 1900–1990; 1990–2000 2010–2020

=== Racial and ethnic composition ===
La Crosse County, Wisconsin – Racial and ethnic composition Note: the US Census treats Hispanic/Latino as an ethnic category. This table excludes Latinos from the racial categories and assigns them to a separate category. Hispanics/Latinos may be of any race.
| Race / ethnicity (NH = Non-Hispanic) | Pop 1980 | Pop 1990 | Pop 2000 | Pop 2010 | Pop 2020 | % 1980 | % 1990 | % 2000 | % 2010 | % 2020 |
|---|---|---|---|---|---|---|---|---|---|---|
| White alone (NH) | 89,882 | 93,954 | 100,332 | 104,417 | 105,307 | 98.71% | 95.97% | 93.66% | 91.08% | 87.19% |
| Black or African American alone (NH) | 171 | 405 | 975 | 1,553 | 1,927 | 0.19% | 0.41% | 0.91% | 1.35% | 1.60% |
| Native American or Alaska Native alone (NH) | 269 | 332 | 410 | 438 | 440 | 0.30% | 0.34% | 0.38% | 0.38% | 0.36% |
| Asian alone (NH) | 261 | 2,545 | 3,349 | 4,727 | 5,599 | 0.29% | 2.60% | 3.13% | 4.12% | 4.64% |
| Native Hawaiian or Pacific Islander alone (NH) | x | x | 18 | 27 | 16 | x | x | 0.02% | 0.02% | 0.01% |
| Other race alone (NH) | 129 | 28 | 60 | 85 | 385 | 0.14% | 0.03% | 0.06% | 0.07% | 0.32% |
| Mixed race or Multiracial (NH) | x | x | 986 | 1,650 | 4,059 | x | x | 0.92% | 1.44% | 3.36% |
| Hispanic or Latino (any race) | 344 | 640 | 990 | 1,741 | 3,051 | 0.38% | 0.65% | 0.92% | 1.52% | 2.53% |
| Total | 91,056 | 97,904 | 107,120 | 114,638 | 120,784 | 100.00% | 100.00% | 100.00% | 100.00% | 100.00% |

=== 2020 census ===
As of the 2020 census, the county had a population of 120,784. The median age was 37.0 years. 20.0% of residents were under the age of 18 and 17.5% of residents were 65 years of age or older. For every 100 females there were 96.1 males, and for every 100 females age 18 and over there were 94.2 males age 18 and over.

There were 50,088 households in the county, of which 25.0% had children under the age of 18 living in them. Of all households, 43.8% were married-couple households, 20.9% were households with a male householder and no spouse or partner present, and 27.0% were households with a female householder and no spouse or partner present. About 32.1% of all households were made up of individuals and 12.1% had someone living alone who was 65 years of age or older.

The population density was 267.3 people per square mile (103.2 people/km^{2}). There were 52,774 housing units at an average density of 116.8 units per square mile (45.1 units/km^{2}), of which 5.1% were vacant. Among occupied housing units, 62.0% were owner-occupied and 38.0% were renter-occupied. The homeowner vacancy rate was 0.8% and the rental vacancy rate was 5.0%.

The racial makeup of the county was 88.0% White, 1.7% Black or African American, 0.4% American Indian and Alaska Native, 4.6% Asian, <0.1% Native Hawaiian and Pacific Islander, 0.9% from some other race, and 4.4% from two or more races. Hispanic or Latino residents of any race comprised 2.5% of the population.

81.9% of residents lived in urban areas, while 18.1% lived in rural areas.

2000 Census Age Pyramid for La Crosse County

According to 2014–2018 ACS estimates, the median household income was $55,479 and the median family income was $67,388. Males had a median income of $48,675 and females $38,714. The per capita income was $26,065. About 9.1% of families and 10.9% of the population were below the poverty line, including 8.2% of those under age 18 and 7.3% of those age 65 or over.

=== 2010 census ===
At the 2010 census, there were 114,638 people, 46,137 households and 27,373 families residing in the county. The population density was 255 per square mile (98/km^{2}). There were 46,137 housing units at an average density of 96 per square mile (37/km^{2}). The racial make up was 92.1% White, 1.4% Black or African American, 0.4% Native American, 4.1% Asian, 0.00% Pacific Islander, 0.3% from other races, and 1.6% from two or more races. 0.92% of the population were Hispanic or Latino of any race. 38.9% were of German, 20.3% Norwegian and 7.9% Irish ancestry. In 2017, there were 1,188 births, giving a general fertility rate of 47.9 births per 1000 women aged 15–44, the fifth lowest rate out of all 72 Wisconsin counties.

== Government ==
- Board Chair: Tina Tryggestad
- District Attorney: Tim Gruenke (D)
- Sheriff: John Siegel (D)
- County Clerk: Ginny Dankmeyer (D)
- County Treasurer: Amy Twitchell (D)
- Register of Deeds: Robin Kadrmas (D)
- Board of Supervisors: (30 members) (D Majority)
- County Administrator: Jane Klekamp

== Politics ==
United States presidential election results for La Crosse County, Wisconsin
| Year | Republican | | Democratic | | Third party(ies) | |
| Year | No. | % | No. | % | No. | % |
|---|---|---|---|---|---|---|
| 1892 | 3,693 | 42.88% | 3,810 | 44.24% | 1,110 | 12.89% |
| 1896 | 6,297 | 64.58% | 3,058 | 31.36% | 396 | 4.06% |
| 1900 | 5,324 | 58.24% | 3,609 | 39.48% | 208 | 2.28% |
| 1904 | 5,506 | 61.76% | 3,089 | 34.65% | 320 | 3.59% |
| 1908 | 4,382 | 50.15% | 4,054 | 46.40% | 301 | 3.45% |
| 1912 | 2,272 | 28.28% | 4,263 | 53.07% | 1,498 | 18.65% |
| 1916 | 3,597 | 44.37% | 4,123 | 50.86% | 386 | 4.76% |
| 1920 | 10,067 | 73.96% | 2,588 | 19.01% | 956 | 7.02% |
| 1924 | 5,733 | 32.49% | 1,252 | 7.09% | 10,662 | 60.42% |
| 1928 | 11,321 | 55.78% | 8,877 | 43.74% | 97 | 0.48% |
| 1932 | 7,686 | 36.94% | 12,919 | 62.10% | 200 | 0.96% |
| 1936 | 7,558 | 33.09% | 14,455 | 63.29% | 827 | 3.62% |
| 1940 | 13,711 | 50.92% | 13,079 | 48.58% | 134 | 0.50% |
| 1944 | 12,784 | 50.93% | 12,247 | 48.79% | 72 | 0.29% |
| 1948 | 10,525 | 45.25% | 12,345 | 53.07% | 390 | 1.68% |
| 1952 | 19,271 | 61.90% | 11,808 | 37.93% | 53 | 0.17% |
| 1956 | 18,264 | 61.66% | 11,258 | 38.01% | 100 | 0.34% |
| 1960 | 18,319 | 56.08% | 14,310 | 43.81% | 36 | 0.11% |
| 1964 | 13,135 | 44.07% | 16,625 | 55.78% | 43 | 0.14% |
| 1968 | 17,433 | 55.76% | 11,570 | 37.00% | 2,264 | 7.24% |
| 1972 | 21,992 | 63.29% | 12,152 | 34.97% | 602 | 1.73% |
| 1976 | 24,188 | 58.06% | 16,674 | 40.02% | 797 | 1.91% |
| 1980 | 23,427 | 51.73% | 17,304 | 38.21% | 4,554 | 10.06% |
| 1984 | 25,721 | 58.77% | 17,787 | 40.64% | 261 | 0.60% |
| 1988 | 21,548 | 48.90% | 22,204 | 50.39% | 314 | 0.71% |
| 1992 | 18,891 | 36.14% | 22,838 | 43.69% | 10,544 | 20.17% |
| 1996 | 16,482 | 35.83% | 23,647 | 51.41% | 5,872 | 12.76% |
| 2000 | 24,327 | 43.79% | 28,455 | 51.22% | 2,777 | 5.00% |
| 2004 | 28,289 | 45.53% | 33,170 | 53.38% | 677 | 1.09% |
| 2008 | 23,701 | 37.49% | 38,524 | 60.94% | 993 | 1.57% |
| 2012 | 25,751 | 40.58% | 36,693 | 57.82% | 1,018 | 1.60% |
| 2016 | 26,378 | 41.43% | 32,406 | 50.89% | 4,890 | 7.68% |
| 2020 | 28,684 | 42.25% | 37,846 | 55.75% | 1,354 | 1.99% |
| 2024 | 32,247 | 44.63% | 39,008 | 53.98% | 1,006 | 1.39% |

La Crosse County has voted for the Democratic nominee in every presidential election since 1988. The Milwaukee Journal Sentinel ranked La Crosse County as one of Wisconsin's most Democratic counties. As a result of the 2020 presidential election, La Crosse County continued its Democratic trend by about 4% with a 13% lead over Republicans. In the 2022 United States elections Democrats won every contested race in La Crosse County and flipped the Sheriff's race for the first time in recent history.

La Crosse County is within the Wisconsin State Senate district 32, represented by Brad Pfaff (D). It also contains Wisconsin State Assembly districts 94 Steve Doyle (D), 95 Jill Billings (D), and 96 Tara Johnson (D). Democrats also hold a majority of seats on the La Crosse County Board of Supervisors.

== Communities ==
=== Cities ===
- La Crosse (county seat)
- Onalaska

=== Villages ===
- Bangor
- French Island
- Holmen
- Rockland
- West Salem

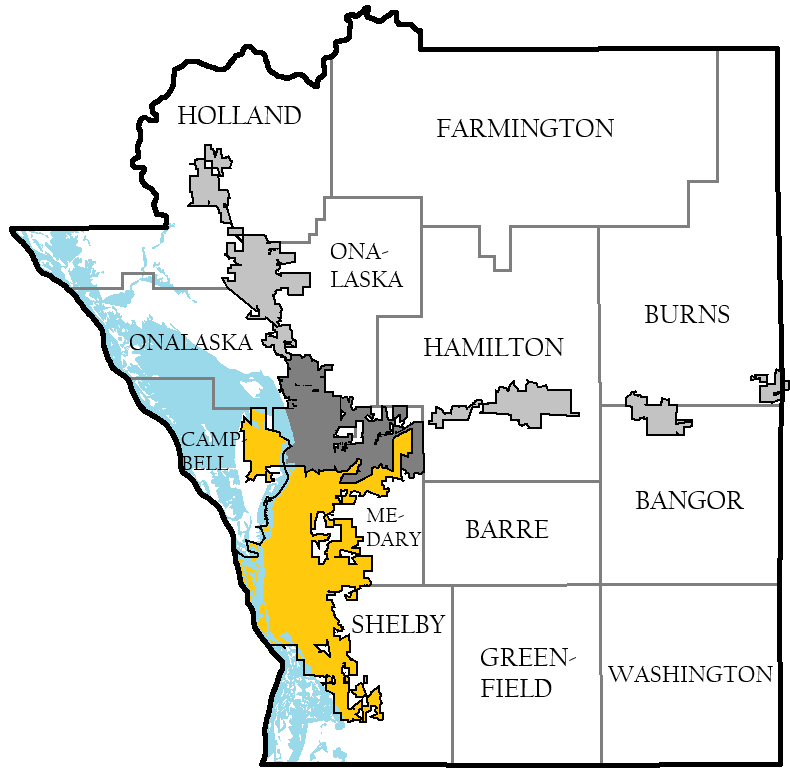
Towns of La Crosse County

=== Towns ===
- Bangor
- Barre
- Burns
- Farmington
- Greenfield
- Hamilton
- Holland
- Medary
- Onalaska
- Shelby
- Washington

=== Census-designated places ===
- Brice Prairie, part of the Town of Onalaska and an urban reserve area of the City of Onalaska
- French Island
- Mindoro
- St. Joseph

=== Unincorporated communities ===
- Barre Mills
- Burns
- Burns Corners
- Burr Oak
- Council Bay
- Medary
- Middle Ridge
- Midway
- New Amsterdam
- Newberg Corners
- Shelby
- Stevenstown
- West La Crosse

== See also ==
- National Register of Historic Places listings in La Crosse County, Wisconsin
- Upper Mississippi River National Wildlife and Fish Refuge
