= Onalaska (town), Wisconsin =

Town in the United States

Onalaska, Wisconsin
- Town
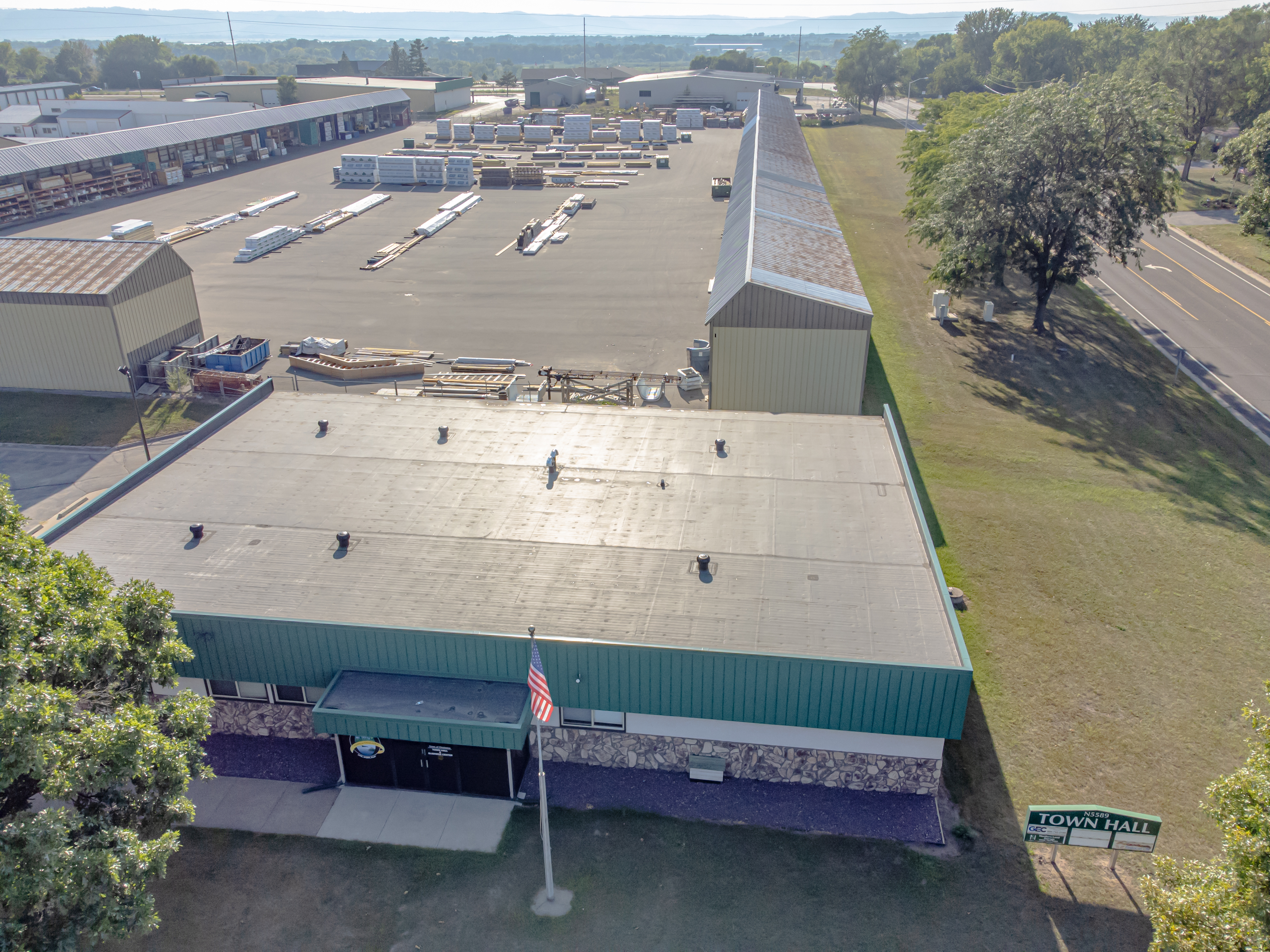
- Onalaska Town Hall on Commerce Road just off of County OT, at Midway

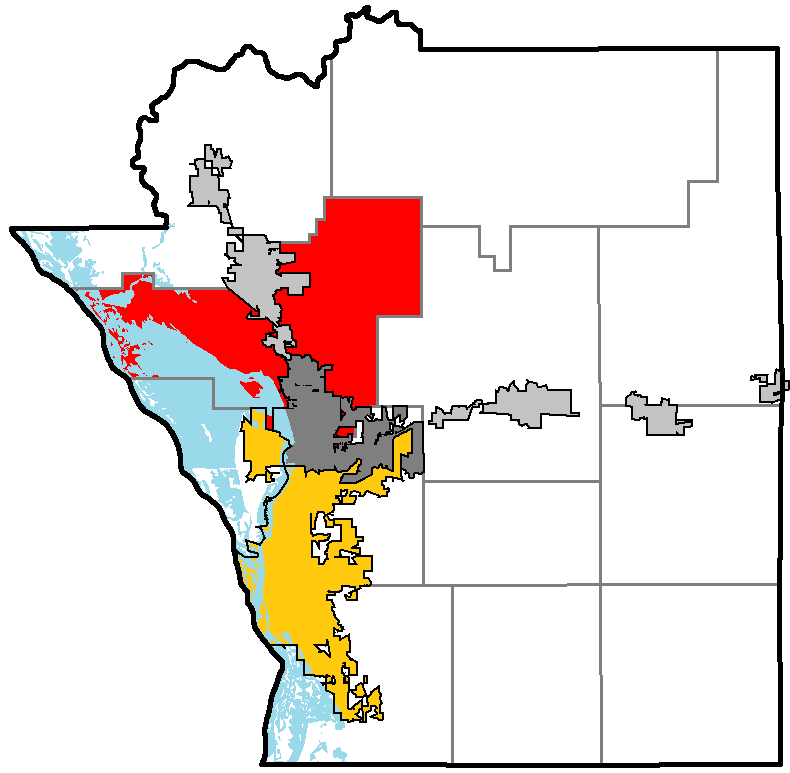
- Location of Onalaska, La Crosse County

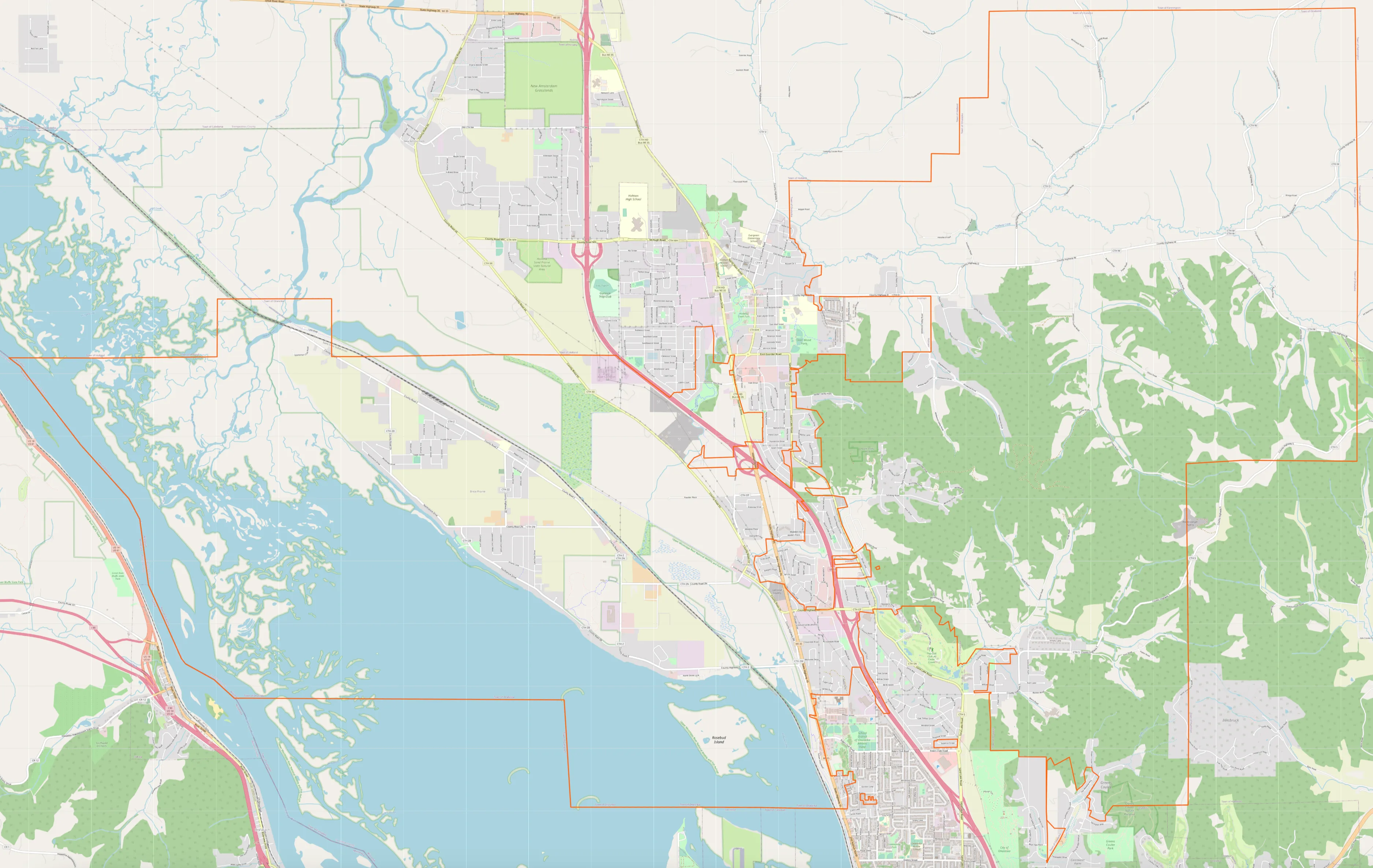
- Coordinates: 43°56′1″N 91°15′33″W
- Country: United States
- State: Wisconsin
- County: La Crosse

Area
  - Total: 44.9 sq mi (116.3 km^{2})
  - Land: 37.0 sq mi (95.8 km^{2})
  - Water: 7.9 sq mi (20.5 km^{2})
- Elevation: 719 ft (219 m)

Population (2020)
  - Total: 5,835
  - Density: 158/sq mi (60.9/km^{2})
- Time zone: UTC-6 (Central (CST))
  - Summer (DST): UTC-5 (CDT)
- Area code: 608
- FIPS code: 55-59950
- GNIS feature ID: 1583862

Onalaska (/ˌɒnəˈlæskə/ ON-ə-LASS-kə) is a town in La Crosse County, Wisconsin, United States. The population was 5,835 at the 2020 census. The City of Onalaska borders the town, as does the village of Holmen. The CDP of Brice Prairie is located in the western part of the Town of Onalaska. The unincorporated community of Midway is also located in the town. Onalaska (town), Wisconsin is part of the La Crosse, Wisconsin Metropolitan Statistical Area.

== History ==
In June 2013 the Onalaska Town Board voted to incorporate as a village and to name the new village Midway. The unincorporated community of Midway is located in the town and the town hall is located there. The proposed village is seeking to prevent the village of Holmen and city of Onalaska from taking any more property from within its boundaries. Holmen is expected to object to the incorporation.

== Geography ==
According to the United States Census Bureau, the town has a total area of 44.9 square miles (116.3 km^{2}), of which 37 square miles (95.8 km^{2}) is land and 7.9 square miles (20.5 km^{2}) (17.59%) is water.

== Demographics ==
Historical population
Year	Pop.	±%
1990	4,679	—
2000	5,210	+11.3%
2010	5,623	+7.9%

As of the census of 2000, there were 5,210 people, 1,777 households, and 1,503 families residing in the town. The population density was 140.8 people per square mile (54.4/km^{2}). There were 1,834 housing units at an average density of 49.6 per square mile (19.1/km^{2}). The racial makeup of the town was 97.02% White, 0.23% Black or African American, 0.61% Native American, 1.29% Asian, 0.12% from other races, and 0.73% from two or more races. 0.6% of the population were Hispanic or Latino of any race.

There are about 1,777 households, out of which 43.8% had children under the age of 18 living with them, 75.7% were married couples living together, 5.1% had a female householder with no husband present, and 15.4% were non-families. 11.4% of all households were made up of individuals, and 3.2% had someone living alone who was 65 years of age or older. The average household size was 2.93 and the average family size was 3.17.

In the town, the population was spread out, with 30% under the age of 18, 6.7% from 18 to 24, 31.6% from 25 to 44, 26.1% from 45 to 64, and 5.6% who were 65 years of age or older. The median age was 36 years. For every 100 females, there were 104.3 males. For every 100 females age 18 and over, there were 103.3 males.

The median income for a household in the town was $54,075, and the median income for a family was $57,268. Males had a median income of $37,310 versus $24,236 for females. The per capita income for the town was $19,887. About 2.7% of families and 3.8% of the population were below the poverty line, including 1% of those under age 18 and 6.4% of those age 65 or over.
