= Wisconsin Highway 71 =

State highway in Wisconsin, United States

State Trunk Highway 71
- WIS 71 highlighted in red

Route information
- Maintained by WisDOT
- Length: 53.55 mi (86.18 km)
- Existed: 1917–present

Major junctions
- West end: WIS 54 in Melrose
- WIS 108 south of Melrose; WIS 162 in Four Corners; WIS 27 southeast of Four Corners; WIS 21 / CTH-B in Sparta; WIS 16 / WIS 27 in Sparta; WIS 16 east of Sparta; WIS 131 in Wilton; WIS 131 east of Wilton
- East end: WIS 80 / WIS 82 in Elroy

Location
- Country: United States
- State: Wisconsin
- Counties: Jackson, Monroe, Juneau

Highway system
- Wisconsin State Trunk Highway System; Interstate; US; State; Scenic; Rustic
← WIS 70	→ WIS 72

State Trunk Highway 71 (often called Highway 71, STH-71 or WIS 71) is a 53.55-mile (86.18 km) state highway in Jackson, Monroe, and Juneau counties in the southwestern area of the US state of Wisconsin that runs in a southeast–northwest direction from the Village of Melrose to Elroy.

== Route description ==
=== Melrose to Sparta ===
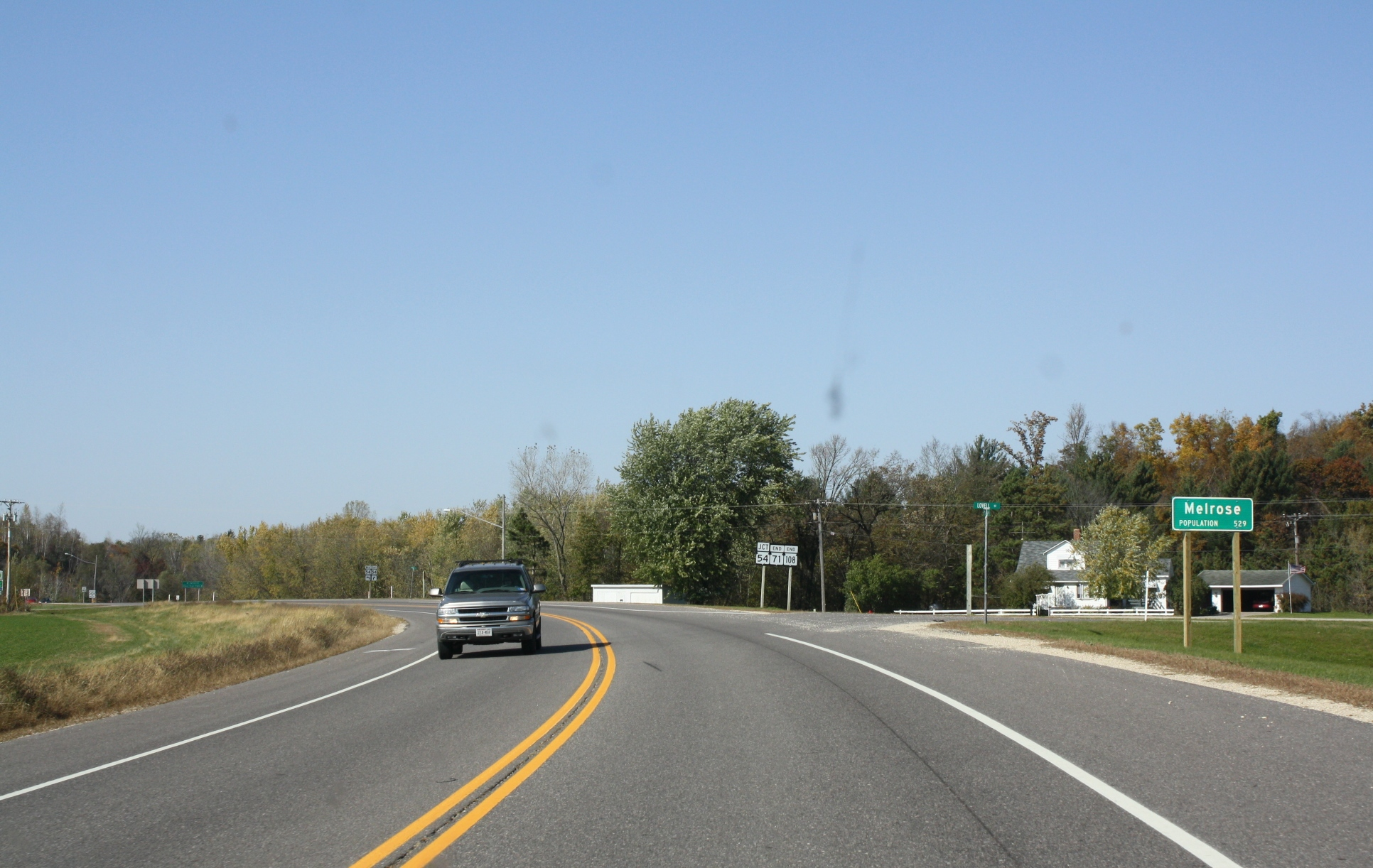
Northern terminus of WIS 71 at WIS 54 in Melrose, October 2010

WIS 71 begins at an intersection with WIS 54 in the southern part of the Village of Melrose in the Town of Melrose, Jackson County; the junction is also the northern terminus of WIS 108. With a few brief exceptions, WIS 71 is almost entirely a two-lane road and, except for the communities through which it passes, WIS 71 runs through rural agricultural land.

From its western terminus WIS 71 initially heads southerly, running concurrently with WIS 108, for about 1.3 miles (2.1 km). The highway quickly leaves the Village of Melrose to enter the Town of Melrose, before crossing the Black River. Shortly after the river crossing, WIS 71 turns easterly at a T intersection; WIS 108 continues southerly toward Mindoro and West Salem.

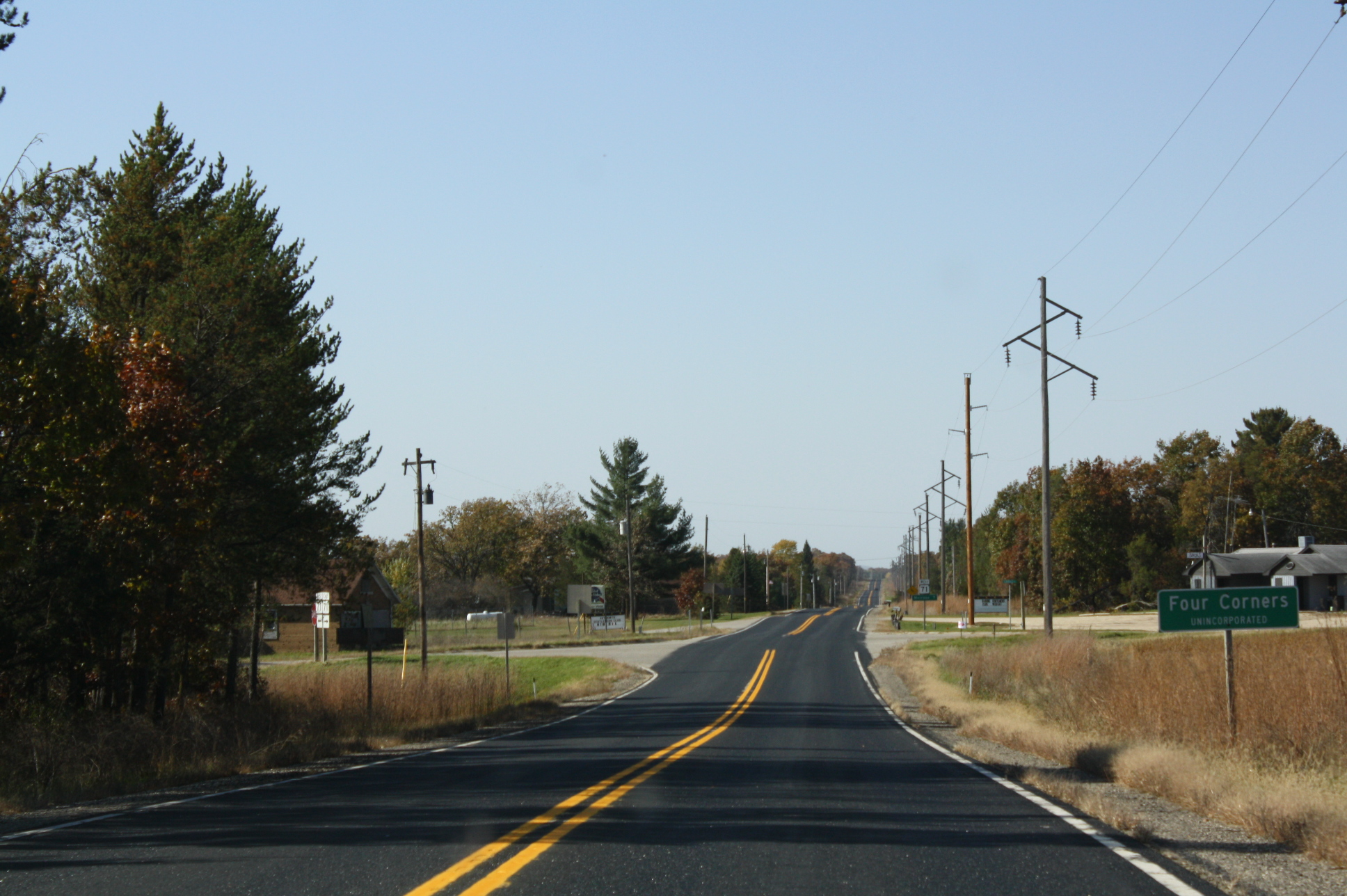
WIS 71 running through Four Corners, October 2020

From the southern end of its concurrency with WIS 108, WIS 71 heads southeasterly for about 1.8 miles (2.9 km) before leaving the Town of Melrose in Jackson County and entering the Town of Little Falls in Monroe County. After roughly 3.0 more miles (4.8 km) the highway reaches its junction with the northern end of WIS 162 in the unincorporated community of Four Corners. Approximately 2.8 miles (4.5 km) further southeasterly, and just after crossing over Spencer Creek, WIS 71 reaches its northern junction with WIS 27 at a T intersection. From its northern junction with WIS 27, WIS 71 heads southerly, concurrently with WIS 27, for about 2.2 miles (3.5 km) before leaving the Town of Little Falls and entering the Town of Sparta. The highway continues southerly for about 5.8 miles (9.3 km) before entering the city of Sparta.

=== Sparta to Wilton ===
Upon entering the city of Sparta, WIS 27/WIS 71 runs along North Black River Street for a few blocks before arriving at their junction with western end of WIS 21 at a traffic light-controlled intersection. About ten blocks further south along South Black River Street, WIS 27/WIS 71 reaches their southern junction, as well as a junction with WIS 16, at another traffic light-controlled intersection. (From that junction, WIS 27 continues south along South Black River Street toward Interstate 94, Melvia, and Cashton. WIS 16 heads west along West Wisconsin Street toward West Salem and La Crosse.)

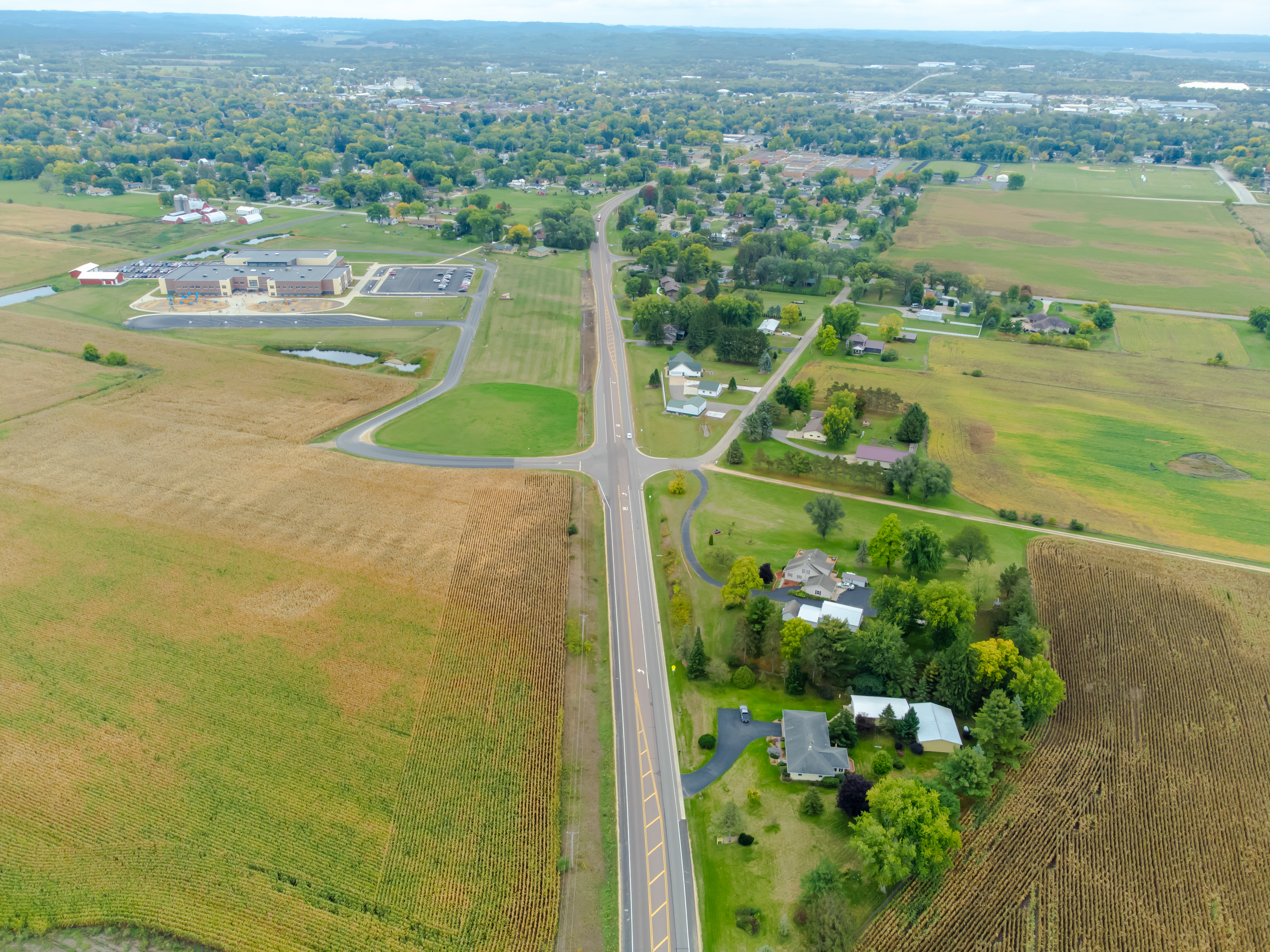
WIS 71/WIS 27 heading into Sparta, September 2023

Heading east along West Wisconsin Street, WIS 71 runs concurrently with WIS 16 for roughly 1.8 miles (2.9 km) until they leave Sparta and enter the Town of Angelo, having crossed over the La Crosse River along the way. Shortly after leaving Sparta, the highways reach the eastern end of their concurrency at a roundabout. Approximately 0.6 miles (0.97 km) south-southeast of the roundabout, WIS 71 crosses over, but does not connect with, I-94. Roughly 2.8 miles (4.5 km) south-southeast of I-94, WIS 71 leaves the Town of Angelo and enters the Town of Wells.

Upon entering the Town of Wells, WIS 71 begins running roughly along the course of the Elroy-Sparta State Trail, a 32.5-mile (52.3 km) Wisconsin State rail trail between Elroy and Sparta. (Note: The 32.5-mile (52.3 km) Elroy-Sparta State Trail (considered to be the first rail trail in the United States) runs along an abandoned section of right-of-way of the former Chicago and North Western Railway between Sparta and Elroy. Roughly following the course of WIS 71, the rail trail and WIS 71 cross paths four times along their respective routes.) About 1.8 miles (2.9 km) south-southeast into the Town of Wells, WIS 71 reaches its junction with the southern end of County Trunk Highway AA (CTH-AA) at a T intersection. About 2.7 miles (4.3 km) further east-southeast, WIS 71 crosses over the Elroy-Sparta State Trail. From this first crossing, the paths of the highway and rail trail diverge such that are separated by just over 1.6 miles (2.6 km) before converging again in the Village of Norwalk. Just under a mile (1.6 km) south-southeast of the rail trail, WIS 71 reaches its junction with the northern end of CTH-XU. A short way beyond the junction, the highway leaves the Town of Wells and enters the Town of Ridgeville. About 2.5 miles (4.0 km) southeast and then east of the junction with CTH-XU, WIS 71 enters the Village of Norwalk.

Shortly after entering the limits of the Village of Norwalk, WIS 71 reaches its western junction with CTH-T. Prior to entering the residential area of the village, WIS 71/CTH-T turns south and become McGary Street. Just over a block later, the highway turns east to run along Railroad Street for two blocks, and then turns south along Main Street. WIS 71/CTH-T then reaches its junction with CTH-U at the southern end of Main Street.

From its junction with CTH-U, WIS 71/CTH-T heads southeast out of the Village of Norwalk to renter the Town of Ridgeville. Nearly a mile (1.6 km) later, after crossing over Moore Creek, WIS 71/CTH-T crosses back over the Elroy-Sparta State Trail and immediately reaches the western junction with CTH-T, and CTH-T heads southerly to eventually end at WIS 131. Running just north of the rail trail, WIS 71 continues easterly for approximately 2.2 miles (3.5 km) before crossing back over the rail trail (at Elroy-Sparta State Trail Tunnel 2). After leaving the Town of Ridgeville and entering the Town of Wilton, the highway turns south-southeast to run just west of the rail trail for about 1.3 miles (2.1 km) on its way to the Village of Wilton.

=== Wilton to Elroy ===
Just prior to entering the Village of Wilton, WIS 71 turns east along Walker Street to pass through the community. Immediately after entering the village, WIS 71 reaches its western junction with WIS 131. Three blocks later WIS 71 and WIS 131 reach their junction with the south end of CTH-M in downtown Wilton. After turning northeast and crossing the Kickapoo River, WIS 71/WIS 131 leaves the Village of Wilton to re-enter the Town of Wilton.

After turning more easterly for about another 2.2 miles (3.5 km), WIS 71/WIS 131 again crosses paths with the Elroy-Sparta State Trail, which crosses over the highway on the former railway bridge. Just under a half-mile (0.8 km) later, WIS 71/WIS 131 crosses over the Kickapoo River again and immediately reaches the eastern WIS 71/WIS 131 junction. Heading southeast for about another 2.6 miles (4.2 km), WIS 71 very briefly passes through the southwest corner of the Town of Clifton. Within the town, WIS 71 has it its junction with the north end of CTH-V. WIS 71 then promptly leaves the Town of Clifton and enters the Town of Glendale. Roughly 2 miles (3.2 km) further east-southeast, WIS 71 crosses over the Baraboo River (for the first of three times). Just under a mile (1.6 km) further southeast, the highway crosses the Elroy-Sparta State Trail (at an at-grade intersection) as it enters the Village of Kendall.

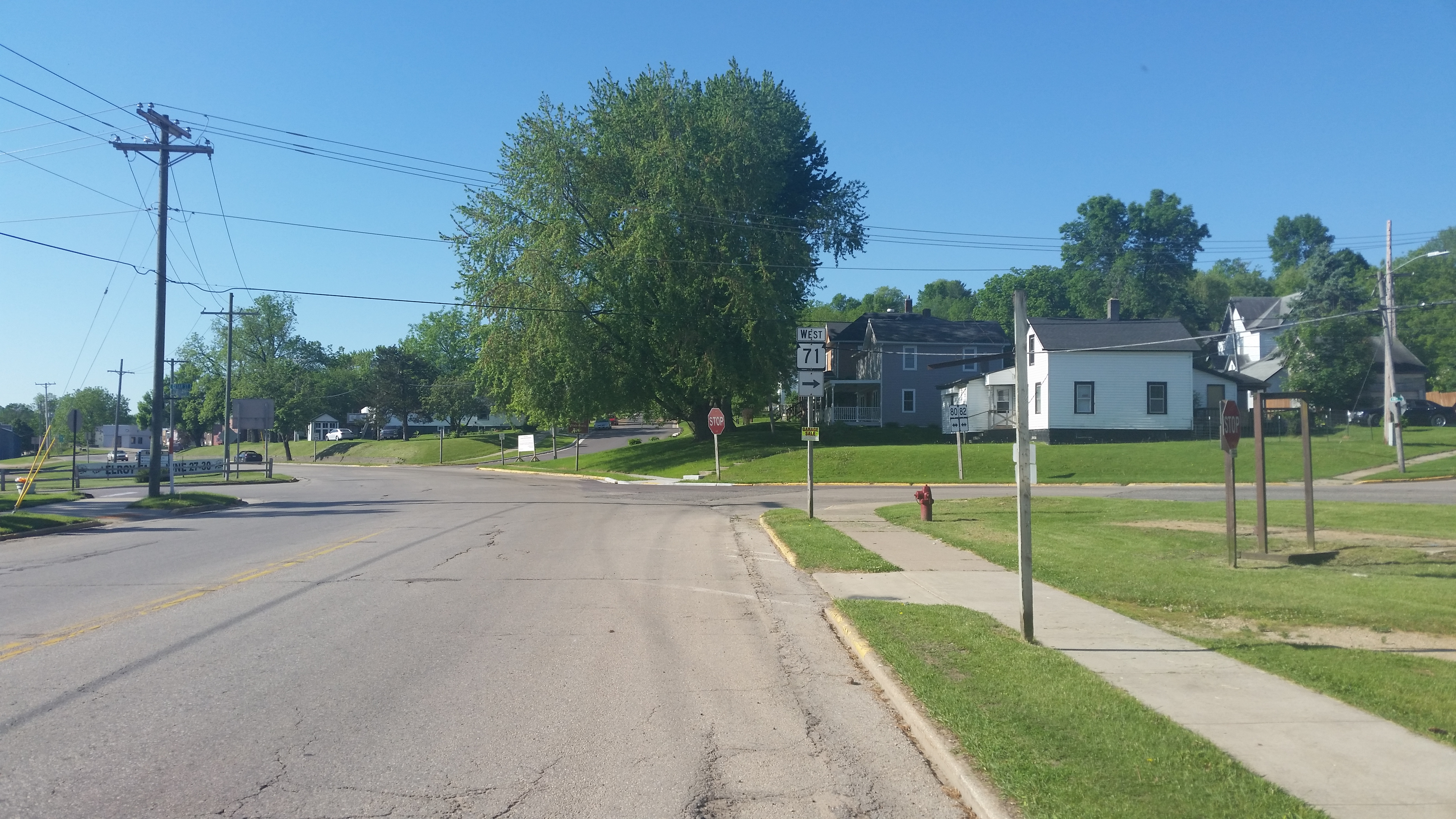
Eastern terminus of WIS 71 at WIS 80/WIS 82 in Elroy, June 2019

Continuing southeasterly along West Railroad Street, and several blocks after entering the Village of Kendall, WIS 71 reaches its western junction with CTH-P on the western end of downtown Kendall. Two blocks further southeast, WIS 71 reaches is eastern junction with CTH-P and its western junction with CTH-W. WIS 71/CTH-W continues southeastward along East Railroad Street for just over a half-mile (0.8 km) before leaving the Village of Kendall and re-entering the Town of Glendale; crossing over the Baraboo River for a second time. The highway quickly reaches is eastern junction at a, just after crossing over the Baraboo River for the third time, and CTH-W heads southerly to end in Union Center. Approximately 0.7 miles (1.1 km) southeast of its eastern junction with CTH-W, WIS 71 passes through the unincorporated community of Glendale; however, there are no major intersections within the community. About 2.2 miles (3.5 km) southeast beyond the community of Glendale, WIS 71 leaves the Town of Glendale, as well as Monroe County, to enter the Town of Plymouth in Juneau County.

About 1.4 miles (2.3 km) southeast into the Town of Plymouth, WIS 71 reaches its junction with CTH-PP. About a half-mile (0.8 km) further southeast, WIS 71 enters the city of Elroy and another 0.6 miles (0.97 km) further southeast, the highway reaches its eastern terminus at a junction with WIS 80/WIS 82 at the northwest end of downtown Elroy. The road continues east from the intersection as Cedar Street for two blocks.

== History ==
WIS 71, as originally laid out in 1917, ran from Elroy easterly to Mauston and was at one time extended to a terminus near the Wisconsin River. In the mid-1950s a new bridge was built over the Wisconsin River, which connected WIS 71 with the former WIS 135 in Adams County, and minor realignments were made to accommodate this connection. The entire stretch from Elroy to U.S. Highway 51 east of Oxford was then redesignated part of WIS 82, as it remains today, and WIS 71 was cut back to its current eastern terminus at WIS 82 in Elroy. A short stub of the old roadway between Mauston and the Wisconsin River remains designated as "Old Hwy 71", now under local control.

== Major intersections ==
County	Location	mi	km	Destinations	Notes
Jackson	Melrose	0.0	0.0	WIS 54 north (Washington Street) / WIS 108 south – Black River Falls, North Bend, Galesville	Northern end of WIS 108 concurrency
Jackson	Town of Melrose	1.4	2.3	WIS 108 south – Mindoro, West Salem	Southern end of WIS 108 concurrency
Monroe	Four Corners	6.2	10.0	WIS 162 south – Bangor	Road continues north as Candle Road
Monroe	Town of Little Falls	9.0	14.5	WIS 27 north – Black River Falls	Northern end of WIS 27 concurrency
Monroe	Sparta	17.4	28.0	WIS 21 / CTH-B east (West Montgomery Street) – Fort McCoy, Tomah	Street continues west from intersection as West Montgomery Street
Monroe	Sparta	18.1	29.1	WIS 16 west (West Wisconsin Street) – West Salem, La Crosse WIS 27 south (South Black River Street) – Melvina, Cashton	Southern end of WIS 27 concurrency; western end of WIS 16 concurrency
Monroe	Town of Angelo	19.9	32.0	WIS 16 east – Tomah	Eastern end of WIS 16 concurrency
Monroe	Town of Wells	25.1	40.4	CTH-AA north	
Monroe	Town of Wells	28.7	46.2	CTH-XU south	Road continues east from intersection as a local road
Monroe	Norwalk	31.4	50.5	CTH-T north (Summit Road)	Northern end of CTH-T concurrency
Monroe	Norwalk	32.4	52.1	CTH-U east (South Water Road) CTH-U west (Main Street) – Cashton	CTH-U runs east and south from the intersection
Monroe	Town of Ridgeville	33.5	53.9	CTH-T south	Southern end of CTH-T concurrency; road continues east from intersection as Leather Avenue
Monroe	Wilton	37.8	60.8	WIS 131 south (South Water Road) – Ontario, La Farge	Western end of WIS 131 concurrency
Monroe	Wilton	38.0	61.2	CTH-M north (Main Street)	
Monroe	Town of Wilton	41.2	66.3	WIS 131 north – Tomah	Eastern end of WIS 131 concurrency
Monroe	Town of Clifton	43.7	70.3	CTH-V south – White City	
Monroe	Kendall	47.2	76.0	CTH-P west (Derrick Street) – Ontario	Western end of CTH-P concurrency; road continues north from intersection as Thayer Street
Monroe	Kendall	47.4	76.3	CTH-P east / CTH-W north (White Street) – Elroy	eastern end of CTH-P concurrency; western end of CTH-W concurrency
Monroe	Town of Glendale	48.2	77.6	CTH-W south – Union Center	eastern end of CTH-W concurrency
Juneau	Town of Plymouth	52.3	84.2	CTH-PP east – Elroy	
Juneau	Elroy	53.55	86.18	WIS 80 / WIS 82 – Mauston, New Lisbon, Union Center; Cedar Street	Eastern terminus; roadway continues as Cedar Street
1.000 mi = 1.609 km; 1.000 km = 0.621 mi: Concurrency terminus
