= Wisconsin Highway 80 =

State highway in Wisconsin, United States

State Trunk Highway 80
- WIS 80 highlighted in red

Route information
- Maintained by WisDOT
- Length: 175.73 mi (282.81 km)

Major junctions
- South end: IL 84 in Hazel Green
- US 151 in Platteville; US 18 in Montfort; US 18 in Cobb; US 14 in Richland Center; US 12 / WIS 16 in New Lisbon; I-90 / I-94 in New Lisbon
- North end: US 10 in Marshfield

Location
- Country: United States
- State: Wisconsin
- Counties: Grant, Iowa, Richland, Vernon, Juneau, Wood

Highway system
- Wisconsin State Trunk Highway System; Interstate; US; State; Scenic; Rustic
← WIS 79	→ WIS 81

State Trunk Highway 80 (abbreviated as Highway 80, STH-80 or WIS 80) is a state highway in the U.S. state of Wisconsin. It runs north–south in southwest and west central Wisconsin from just south of Marshfield, near the geographic center of the state to the Illinois border near Hazel Green.

== Route description ==
WIS 80 begins at the Illinois state line as a continuation of Illinois Route 84. It enters Hazel Green, where WIS 11 joins for a few miles. North of the end of the concurrency, WIS 80 passes through Cuba City. Occasionally the highway aligns itself with the Grant-Lafayette county line. The highway enters Platteville, where it meets US 151 south of town and WIS 81 in town. As WIS 80 leaves Platteville it heads north along the Iowa-Grant county line past Livingston and into Montfort. At Montfort, the highway joins with US 18 for 8 miles before heading north from Cobb, where the land becomes more forested. WIS 80 heads through Highland. WIS 133 joins WIS 80 west for five miles before WIS 80 heads north again from Muscoda, where it crosses the Wisconsin River.

North of Muscoda, the highway passes through Richland Center and Hub City before entering Hillsboro and joins with WIS 33/WIS 82. The three-way concurrency leaves Hillsboro and enters Union Center, where WIS 33 leaves the concurrency and WIS 80/WIS 82 go north to the southern trailhead of the Elroy-Sparta State Trail, the northern trailhead of the 400 State Trail, and Elroy. In Elroy, WIS 82 leaves the concurrency with WIS 80. WIS 80 continues north and leaves the Driftless Area before entering New Lisbon. North of New Lisbon it passes the junction with Interstate 90/Interstate 94 (I-90/94). North of New Lisbon the highway passes through the center of Necedah, and the terrain is flat as it passes along the Necedah National Wildlife Refuge and enters Pittsville, where it merges with WIS 73 and heading west for 2.5 miles. As it leaves the concurrency, it runs north through the farmlands of Wood County, Wisconsin. WIS 80 ends at a roundabout junction with US 10 just south of Marshfield.

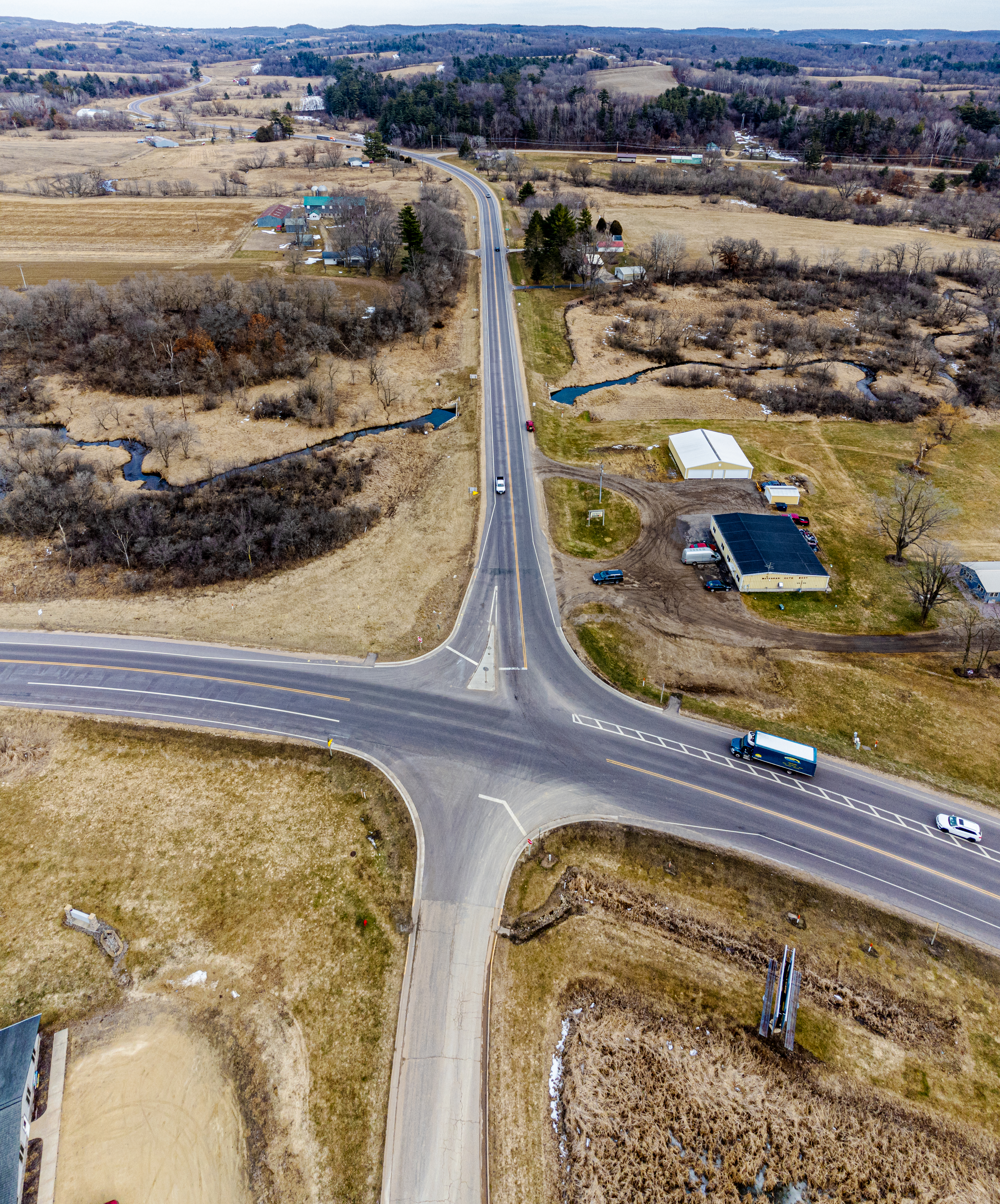
WIS 80/WIS 82 junction north of Elroy

WIS 80 crosses the Wisconsin River into Muscoda, which bills itself as the "Morel mushroom capital of Wisconsin". WIS 133 joins WIS 80 east five miles (8.0 km) before WIS 80 heads south again to Highland and Cobb, where the land continues to be hilly but becomes less forested and more rolling farmland. At Cobb, WIS 80 follows US 18 west for five miles (8.0 km) before heading south along the Iowa–Grant county line past Livingston and into Platteville, where it meets WIS 81 in town and US 151 south of town at the freeway bypass. South of Platteville, WIS 80 occasionally aligns itself along the Grant–Lafayette county line as it heads through Cuba City and Hazel Green, where WIS 11 joins for a few miles. South of Hazel Green, WIS 80 ends at the Illinois state line, where it meets Illinois Route 84 (IL 84) one-half mile (0.80 km) west of the state's "Point of Beginning", the location from which most public land surveys in Wisconsin originated.

== Major intersections ==
County	Location	mi	km	Destinations	Notes
Grant	Town of Hazel Green	0.00	0.00	IL 84 south – Galena	Continuation into Illinois
Grant	Hazel Green	1.8	2.9	WIS 11 west – Dubuque	Southern end of WIS 11 concurrency
Grant	Town of Hazel Green	4.7	7.6	WIS 11 east – Benton	Northern end of WIS 11 concurrency
Grant	Town of Smelser	11.3	18.2	WIS 81 east – Darlington	Southern end of WIS 81 concurrency
Grant	Platteville	14.9	24.0	US 151 – Dubuque, Madison	
Grant	Platteville	16.3	26.2	Bus. US 151 (Dubuque Road)	
Grant	Platteville	16.6	26.7	WIS 81 west – Lancaster	Northern end of WIS 81 concurrency
Grant–Iowa county line	Montfort	34.5	55.5	US 18 west – Fennimore	Western end of US 18 concurrency
Iowa	Cobb	39.5	63.6	US 18 east – Dodgeville	Eastern end of US 18 concurrency
Iowa	Town of Pulaski	57.0	91.7	WIS 133 north – Avoca, Lone Rock	Eastern end of WIS 133 concurrency
Grant	Muscoda	61.8	99.5	WIS 133 south – Blue River, Boscobel	Western end of WIS 133 concurrency
Richland	Town of Eagle	63.1	101.5	WIS 60 – Gotham, Wauzeka	
Richland	Town of Eagle	65.1	104.8	WIS 193 south	
Richland	Richland Center	73.7	118.6	US 14 – La Crosse, Madison	
Richland	Town of Rockbridge	78.1	125.7	WIS 56 west – Viola	
Vernon	Hillsboro	98.1	157.9	WIS 33 west / WIS 82 west – Ontario, La Farge	Southern end of WIS 33/WIS 82 concurrency
Juneau	Union Center	103.0	165.8	WIS 33 east – Wonewoc	Northern end of WIS 33 concurrency
Juneau	Elroy	107.3	172.7	WIS 71 west – Kendall	
Juneau	Elroy	108.6	174.8	WIS 82 east – Mauston	Northern end of WIS 82 concurrency
Juneau	New Lisbon	119.0	191.5	US 12 east / WIS 16 east – Mauston	Southern end of US 12/WIS 16 concurrency
Juneau	New Lisbon	119.5	192.3	US 12 west / WIS 16 west – Camp Douglas	Northern end of US 12/WIS 16 concurrency
Juneau	New Lisbon	120.6	194.1	I-90 / I-94 – Tomah, Madison	
Juneau	Town of Clearfield	127.7	205.5	WIS 58 south – Mauston	
Juneau	Necedah	131.7	212.0	WIS 21 – Tomah, Coloma	
Wood	Town of Remington	151.1	243.2	WIS 173 south – Mather	Southern end of WIS 173 concurrency
Wood	Babcock	152.5	245.4	WIS 173 north – Nekoosa	Northern end of WIS 173 concurrency
Wood	Town of Dexter	156.6	252.0	WIS 54 east – Port Edwards	Southern end of WIS 54 concurrency
Wood	Dexterville	157.4	253.3	WIS 54 west – Black River Falls	Northern end of WIS 54 concurrency
Wood	Pittsville	163.1	262.5	WIS 73 east – Wisconsin Rapids	Eastern end of WIS 73 concurrency
Wood	Town of Wood	165.5	266.3	WIS 73 west – Neillsville	Western end of WIS 73 concurrency
Wood	Town of Cameron	175.73	282.81	US 10 – Marshfield, Neillsville, Stevens Point	Roundabout
1.000 mi = 1.609 km; 1.000 km = 0.621 mi
