= Wisconsin Highway 108 =

State highway in Wisconsin, United States

State Trunk Highway 108
- WIS 108 highlighted in red

Route information
- Maintained by WisDOT
- Length: 19.08 mi (30.71 km)

Major junctions
- South end: WIS 16 in West Salem
- North end: WIS 54 / WIS 71 in Melrose

Location
- Country: United States
- State: Wisconsin
- Counties: La Crosse, Jackson

Highway system
- Wisconsin State Trunk Highway System; Interstate; US; State; Scenic; Rustic
← WIS 107	→ WIS 109

State Trunk Highway 108 (often called Highway 108, STH-108, or WIS 108) is a state highway in the U.S. state of Wisconsin. It runs in west-central Wisconsin from Wisconsin Highway 16 north of West Salem to Wisconsin Highway 54 and Wisconsin Highway 71 in Melrose, passing through La Crosse and Jackson counties. The highway is maintained by the Wisconsin Department of Transportation.

== Route description ==
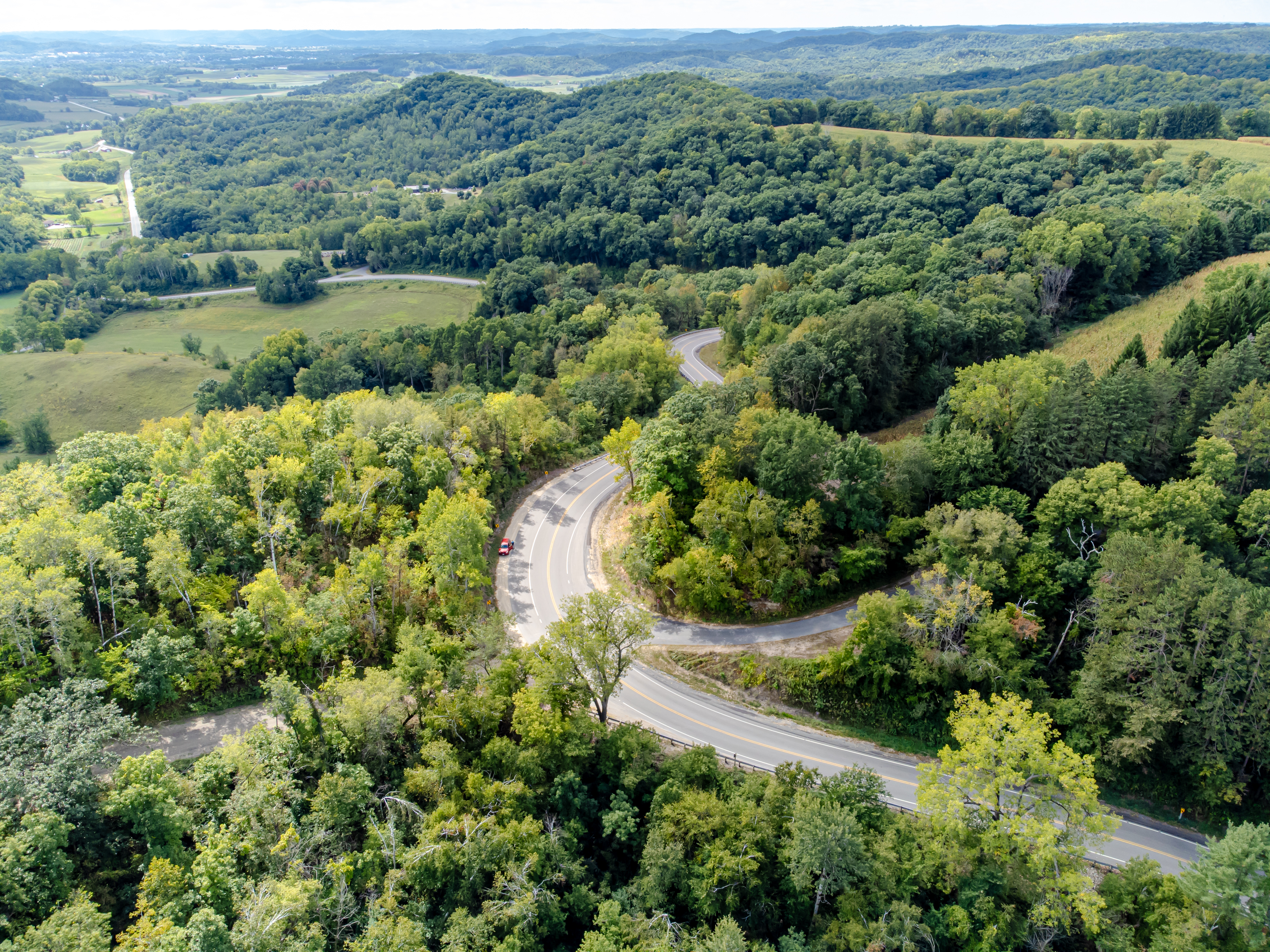
WIS 108

WIS 108 begins at a junction with WIS 16 in the Town of Hamilton in La Crosse County, just north of the border of West Salem. The highway heads northeast along a brief concurrency with County Trunk Highway C (CTH-C), then runs east for a short distance before heading north. From here, the route passes through a rural area and climbs a winding ridge.

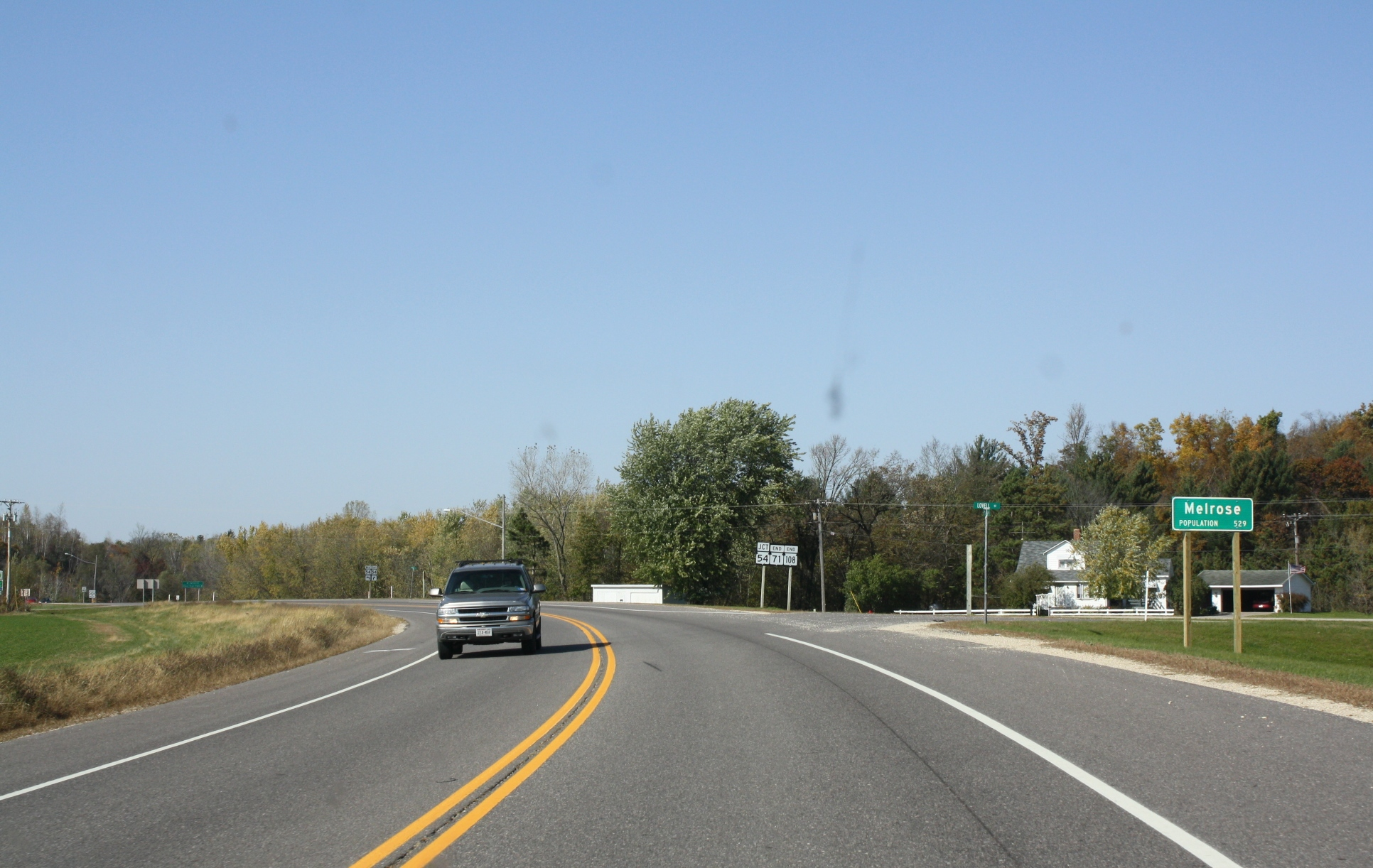
Northern terminus at Melrose

Past the ridge, WIS 108 continues north, intersecting two county highways and crossing Fleming Creek. It turns northeast briefly before continuing north, where it intersects with two more county highways. The highway continues east briefly where it meets CTH-C before curving to the northeast. It then crosses Davis Creek before entering Jackson County. In Jackson County, the route passes Melrose-Mindoro High School before heading north through the Town of Melrose. WIS 108 meets WIS 71 in the town, and the two highways continue northward together. The highways cross the Black River and continue north into the village of Melrose. Both highways terminate at a junction with WIS 54 in southern Melrose.

== History ==
On May 1, 2016, La Crosse County and the Wisconsin Department of Transportation (WisDOT) exchanged control of WIS 108 and County Trunk Highway C (CTH-C). The state assumed approximately 10.1 miles (16.3 km) of CTH-C, which carried higher traffic volumes, while the county received the former state highway. The swap required several property addresses to be renumbered.

== Major intersections ==
County	Location	mi	km	Destinations	Notes
La Crosse	Town of Hamilton	0.0	0.0	WIS 16 – West Salem, La Crosse, Sparta	Southern terminus
Jackson	Town of Melrose	17.8	28.6	WIS 71 east – Sparta	
Jackson	Melrose	19.2	30.9	WIS 54 / WIS 71 ends – Galesville, Black River Falls	Northern terminus
1.000 mi = 1.609 km; 1.000 km = 0.621 mi: Concurrency terminus
