= Mark Douglas (politician) =

American politician

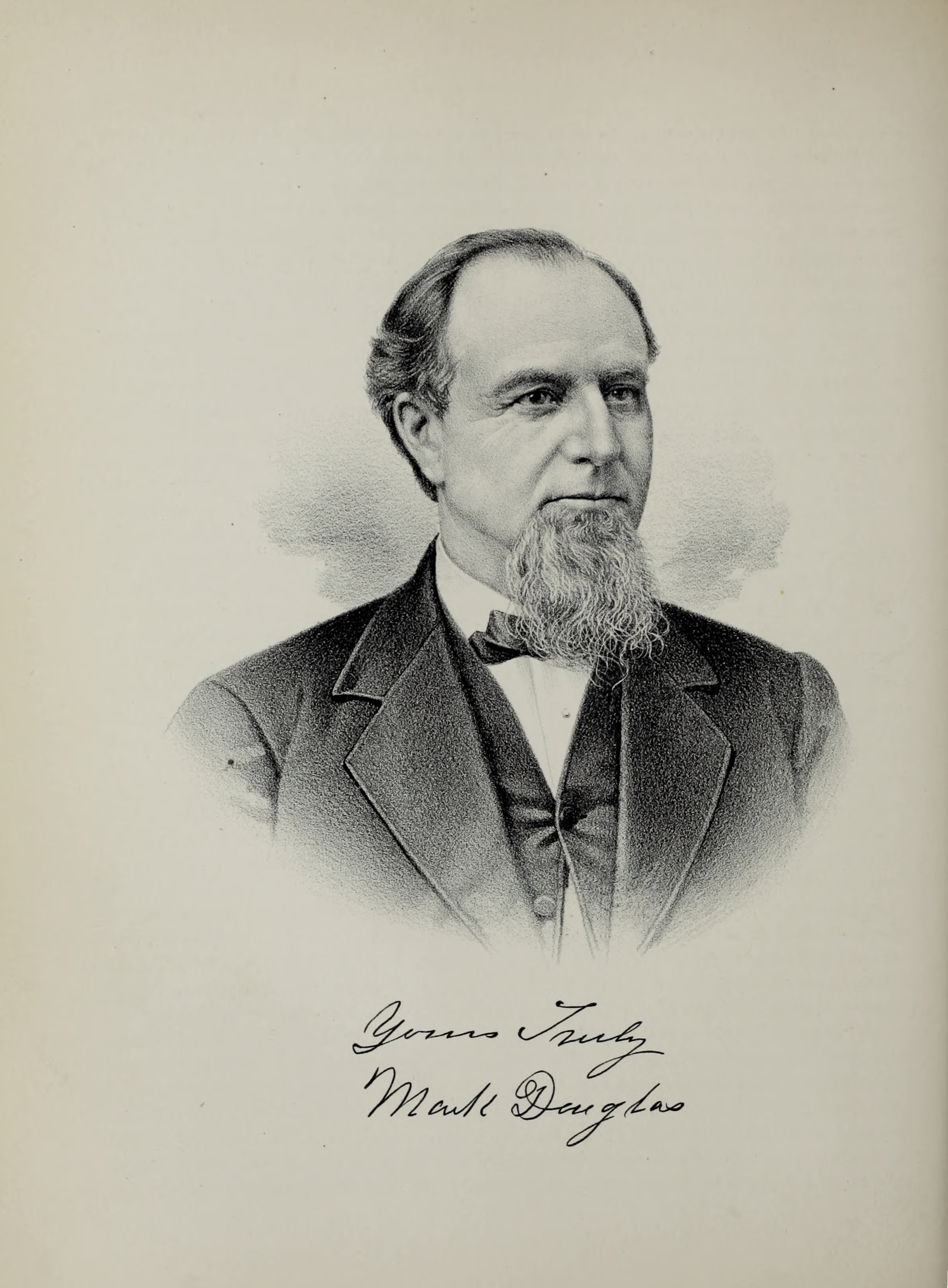
Mark Douglas

Mark Douglas (September 19, 1829 – September 12, 1900) was an American farmer, businessman, and politician.

Douglas was born in Dumfries, Scotland, the son of Thomas Douglas and Jane Dalrymple Douglas. He emigrated to the United States in 1845 and settled in the town of Melrose, Wisconsin Territory. He was a farmer, and in the logging and lumber business. He was postmaster of Melrose, Wisconsin and served as chairman of the town board. He served in the Wisconsin State Assembly in 1874 and the Wisconsin State Senate in 1876 and 1877 as a Republican. He also served on the Wisconsin Fish Commission. He died in Melrose, Wisconsin.
