= Plymouth, Juneau County, Wisconsin =

Plymouth, Wisconsin
- Town
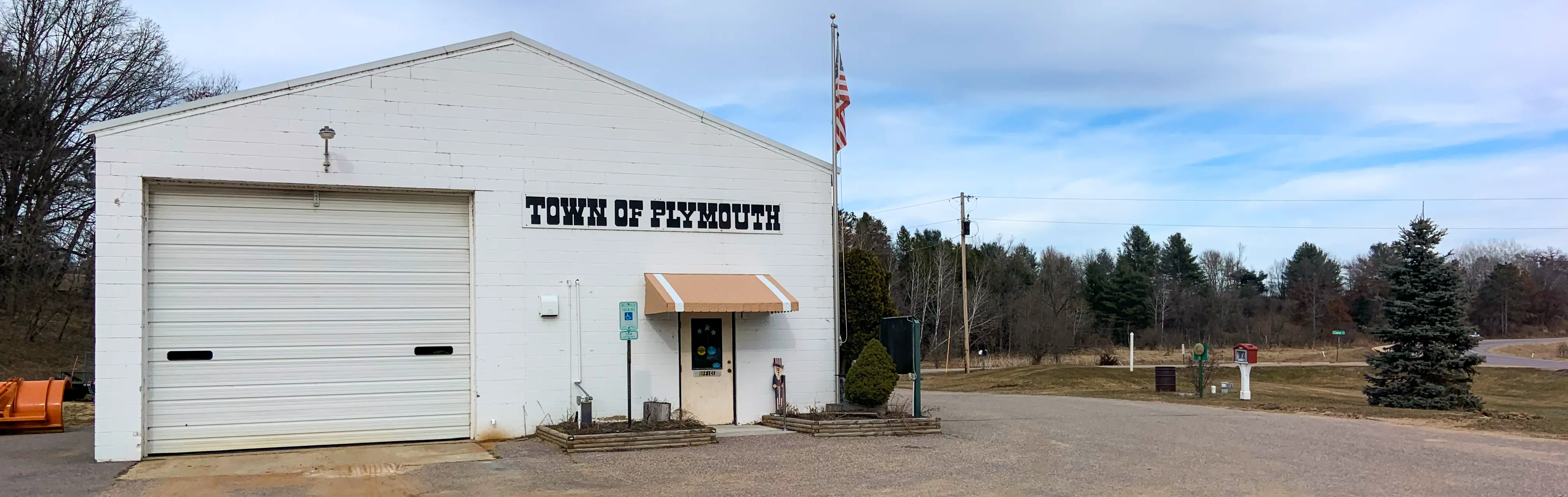
- Town hall on Wis-82

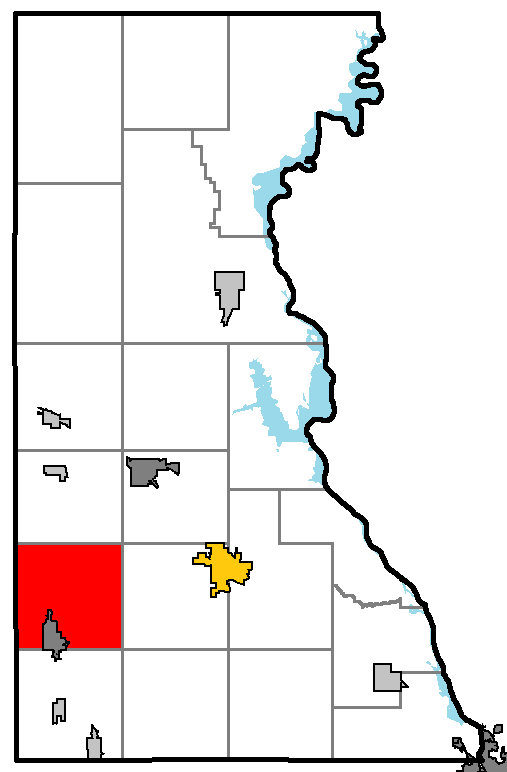
- Location of Plymouth, Juneau County

- Location of Juneau County, Wisconsin
- Coordinates: 43°45′50″N 90°15′24″W
- Country: United States
- State: Wisconsin
- County: Juneau

Area
  - Total: 34.6 sq mi (89.6 km^{2})
  - Land: 34.6 sq mi (89.5 km^{2})
  - Water: 0.039 sq mi (0.1 km^{2})
- Elevation: 1,056 ft (322 m)

Population (2020)
  - Total: 578
  - Density: 16.7/sq mi (6.46/km^{2})
- Time zone: UTC-6 (Central (CST))
  - Summer (DST): UTC-5 (CDT)
- Area code: 608
- FIPS code: 55-63650
- GNIS feature ID: 1583945
- Website: https://www.townofplymouthjc.com/

Plymouth is a town in Juneau County, Wisconsin, United States. The population was 578 at the 2020 census.

== Geography ==
According to the United States Census Bureau, the town has a total area of 34.6 square miles (89.6 km^{2}), of which 34.6 square miles (89.5 km^{2}) is land and 0.04 square miles (0.1 km^{2}) (0.06%) is water.

== Demographics ==
As of the census of 2000, there were 639 people, 244 households, and 183 families residing in the town. The population density was 18.5 people per square mile (7.1/km^{2}). There were 306 housing units at an average density of 8.9 per square mile (3.4/km^{2}). The racial makeup of the town was 100% White.

There were 244 households, out of which 27.5% had children under the age of 18 living with them, 68% were married couples living together, 4.5% had a female householder with no husband present, and 24.6% were non-families. 19.7% of all households were made up of individuals, and 8.2% had someone living alone who was 65 years of age or older. The average household size was 2.62 and the average family size was 3.04.

In the town, the population was spread out, with 24.7% under the age of 18, 6.1% from 18 to 24, 23.2% from 25 to 44, 30.2% from 45 to 64, and 15.8% who were 65 years of age or older. The median age was 42 years. For every 100 females, there were 113 males. For every 100 females age 18 and over, there were 112.8 males.

The median income for a household in the town was $44,271, and the median income for a family was $50,750. Males had a median income of $30,536 versus $22,153 for females. The per capita income for the town was $21,996. About 6.1% of families and 8.2% of the population were below the poverty line, including 16.4% of those under age 18 and 3.1% of those age 65 or over.

== See also ==
- List of towns in Wisconsin
