= Norwalk, Wisconsin =

- Village
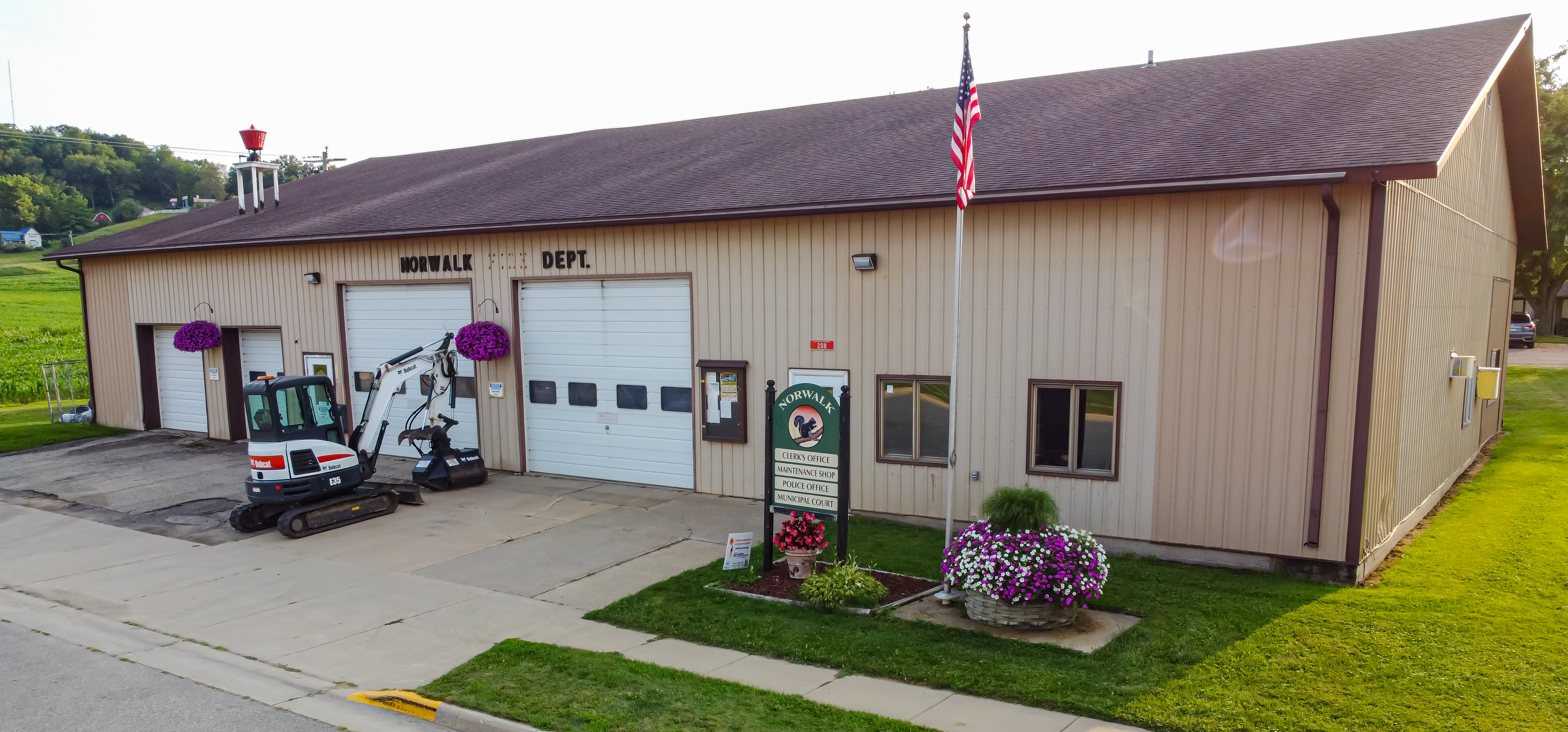
- Village hall

- Location of Norwalk in Monroe County, Wisconsin.
- Coordinates: 43°50′00″N 90°37′27″W
- Country: United States
- State: Wisconsin
- County: Monroe

Area
  - Total: 1.03 sq mi (2.67 km^{2})
  - Land: 1.03 sq mi (2.67 km^{2})
  - Water: 0 sq mi (0.00 km^{2})
- Elevation: 1,020 ft (310 m)

Population (2020)
  - Total: 611
  - Density: 590/sq mi (229/km^{2})
- Time zone: UTC-6 (Central (CST))
  - Summer (DST): UTC-5 (CDT)
- Postal code: 54648
- Area code: 608
- FIPS code: 55-58575
- GNIS feature ID: 1570539
- Website: https://villageofnorwalk.com/

Norwalk is a village in Monroe County, Wisconsin, United States. The population was 611 at the 2020 census.

== History ==
Norwalk, Wisconsin was given its name by Selium McGary, one of the pioneers of Monroe County, who named it after Norwalk, Ohio, where he had previously lived. It is located on what was once the main line of the Chicago and North Western, which in the 1960s was converted into the Elroy-Sparta Bike Trail.

== Geography ==
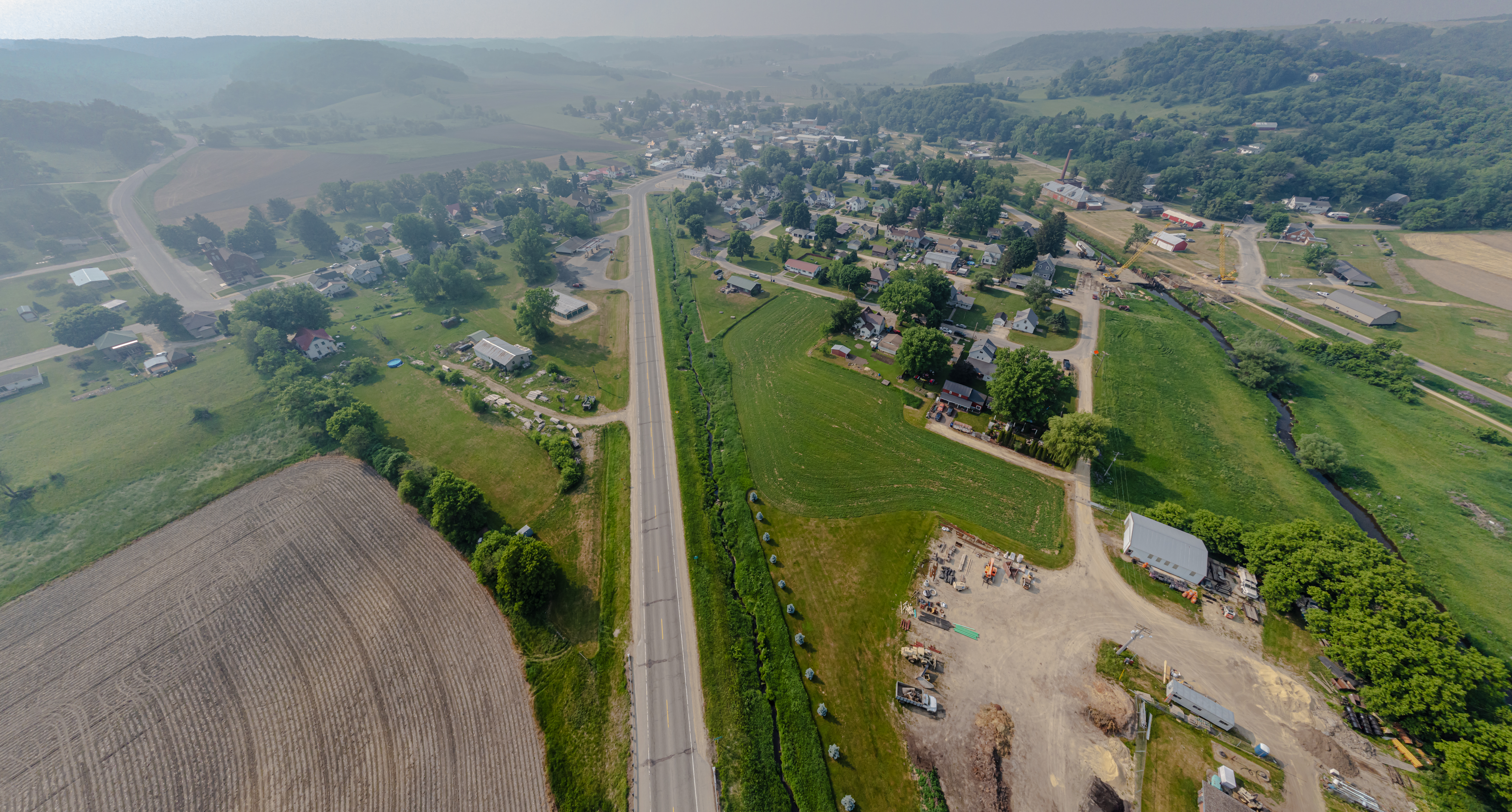
Wis-71 runs through town

Norwalk is located at 43°50′00″N 90°37′27″W (43.833261, -90.624091).

According to the United States Census Bureau, the village has a total area of 1.03 square miles (2.67 km^{2}), all land.

== Demographics ==
Historical population
Census	Pop.	Note	%±
1880	281		—
1900	357		—
1910	502		40.6%
1920	531		5.8%
1930	565		6.4%
1940	551		−2.5%
1950	519		−5.8%
1960	484		−6.7%
1970	432		−10.7%
1980	517		19.7%
1990	564		9.1%
2000	653		15.8%
2010	638		−2.3%
2020	611		−4.2%
U.S. Decennial Census

=== 2010 census ===
As of the census of 2010, there were 638 people, 215 households, and 144 families living in the village. The population density was 607.6 inhabitants per square mile (234.6/km^{2}). There were 237 housing units at an average density of 225.7 per square mile (87.1/km^{2}). The racial makeup of the village was 70.1% White, 0.2% Native American, 1.1% Asian, 27.3% from other races, and 1.4% from two or more races. Hispanic or Latino of any race were 35.1% of the population.

There were 215 households, of which 38.6% had children under the age of 18 living with them, 50.2% were married couples living together, 13.0% had a female householder with no husband present, 3.7% had a male householder with no wife present, and 33.0% were non-families. 25.6% of all households were made up of individuals, and 14% had someone living alone who was 65 years of age or older. The average household size was 2.97 and the average family size was 3.58.

The median age in the village was 31.5 years. 30.1% of residents were under the age of 18; 9.5% were between the ages of 18 and 24; 29.1% were from 25 to 44; 20.8% were from 45 to 64; and 10.3% were 65 years of age or older. The gender makeup of the village was 49.8% male and 50.2% female.

=== 2000 census ===
As of the census of 2000, there were 653 people, 219 households, and 148 families living in the village. The population density was 621.9 people per square mile (240.1/km^{2}). There were 235 housing units at an average density of 223.8 per square mile (86.4/km^{2}). The racial makeup of the village was 72.89% White, 25.57% from other races, and 1.53% from two or more races. Hispanic or Latino of any race were 32.01% of the population.

There were 219 households, out of which 32.0% had children under the age of 18 living with them, 50.7% were married couples living together, 7.8% had a female householder with no husband present, and 32.4% were non-families. 27.9% of all households were made up of individuals, and 17.4% had someone living alone who was 65 years of age or older. The average household size was 2.98 and the average family size was 3.46.

In the village, the population was spread out, with 29.7% under the age of 18, 12.1% from 18 to 24, 29.6% from 25 to 44, 13.5% from 45 to 64, and 15.2% who were 65 years of age or older. The median age was 30 years. For every 100 females, there were 113.4 males. For every 100 females age 18 and over, there were 120.7 males.

The median income for a household in the village was $32,143, and the median income for a family was $39,583. Males had a median income of $22,969 versus $17,344 for females. The per capita income for the village was $13,097. About 11.4% of families and 16.6% of the population were below the poverty line, including 19.3% of those under age 18 and 17.9% of those age 65 or over.

== Notable people ==
- John J. Esch, United States House of Representatives, was born near Norwalk.

== See also ==
- List of villages in Wisconsin
- Ridgeville, Wisconsin - town surrounding Norwalk
