= Robert D. Wilson =

American politician

Robert Dick Wilson (February 3, 1839 – December 4, 1930) was an American farmer and politician.

Born in Falkirk, Scotland, Wilson emigrated to the United States in 1854 and settled in the Town of Melrose, Jackson County, Wisconsin. Wilson was a farmer. Wilson served in the Wisconsin State Assembly in 1880 and was a Republican. He later lived in West Virginia, where he was a mine superintendent, and then moved to Cumberland, Maryland, where he was involved in paper manufacturing. He died in Clarksburg, West Virginia.
