= Wisconsin Highway 82 =

State highway in Wisconsin, United States

State Trunk Highway 82
- WIS 82 highlighted in red

Route information
- Maintained by WisDOT
- Length: 116.15 mi (186.93 km)

Major junctions
- West end: Iowa 9 in DeSoto
- US 14 / US 61 / WIS 27 / WIS 56 in Viroqua; US 12 / WIS 16 in Mauston; I-90 / I-94 in Mauston
- East end: I-39 / US 51 / WIS 23 in Oxford

Location
- Country: United States
- State: Wisconsin
- Counties: Crawford, Vernon, Juneau, Adams, Marquette

Highway system
- Wisconsin State Trunk Highway System; Interstate; US; State; Scenic; Rustic
← WIS 81	→ WIS 83

State Trunk Highway 82 (often called Highway 82, STH-82 or WIS 82) is a state highway in Wisconsin, United States. It runs east–west in southwest and south central Wisconsin from the Iowa border near Lansing, IA to Oxford.

This highway is a low traffic highway for its entire length.

== Route description ==
WIS 82 begins on the Wisconsin side of the Mississippi River near Lansing, Iowa, on the Black Hawk Bridge. Its next junction with a highway is across the bridge at WIS 35. The highway then turns to the north, running concurrently with WIS 35. At De Soto, the highway turns away from the Mississippi River Basin, and heads northeasterly in general.

The next settlement is Viroqua, where it runs concurrently with US Highway 14 (US 14), US 61 and WIS 27. This ends at the traffic light with Decker Street, where the road turns east, concurrent with WIS 56. This concurrency ends approximately four miles (6.4 km) east of Viroqua. WIS 82 turns left, to proceed to La Farge, while WIS 56 continues to Viola.

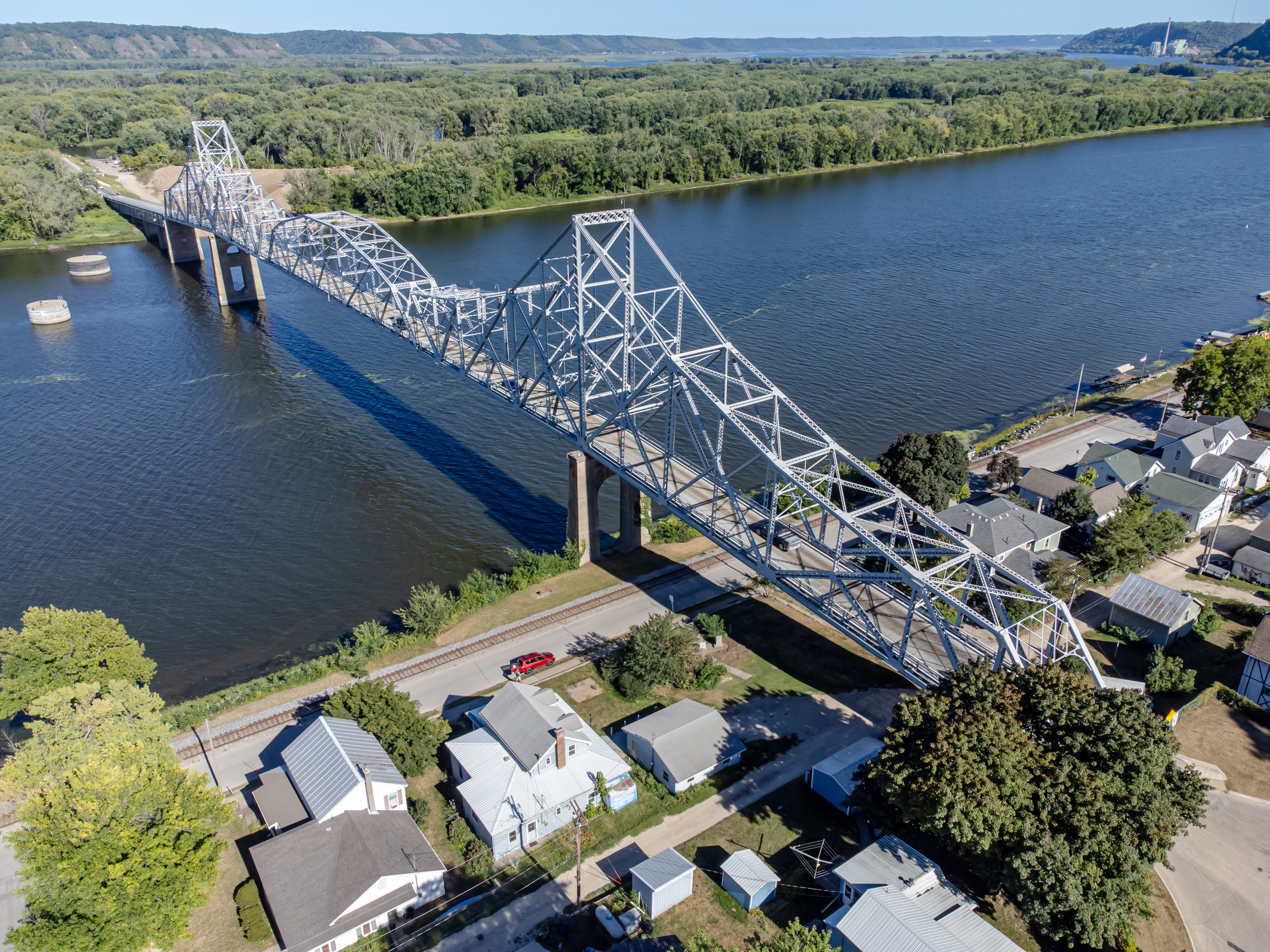
Black Hawk Bridge at the western terminus of WIS 82

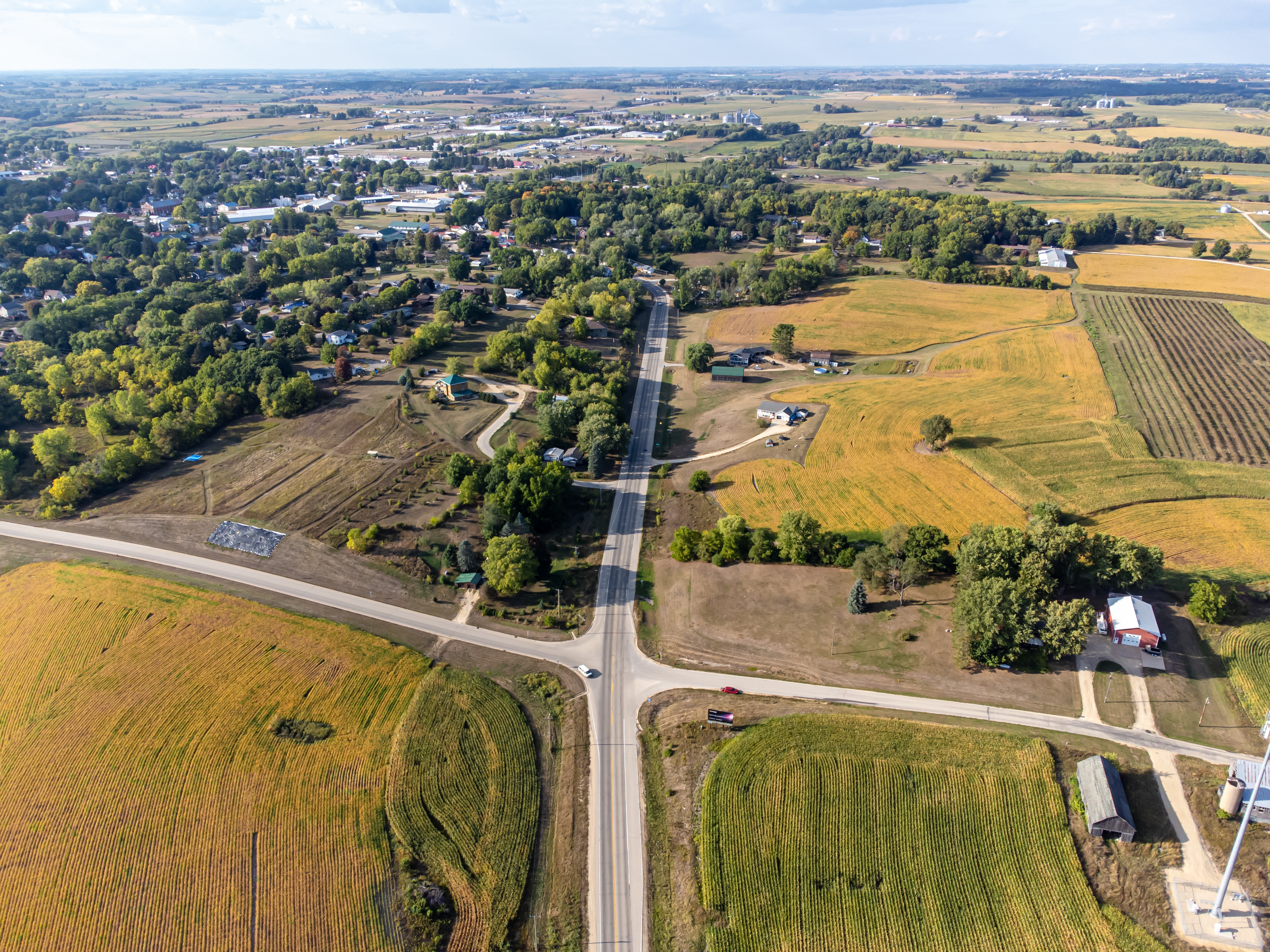
WIS 56 and WIS 82 heading west into the east side of Viroqua

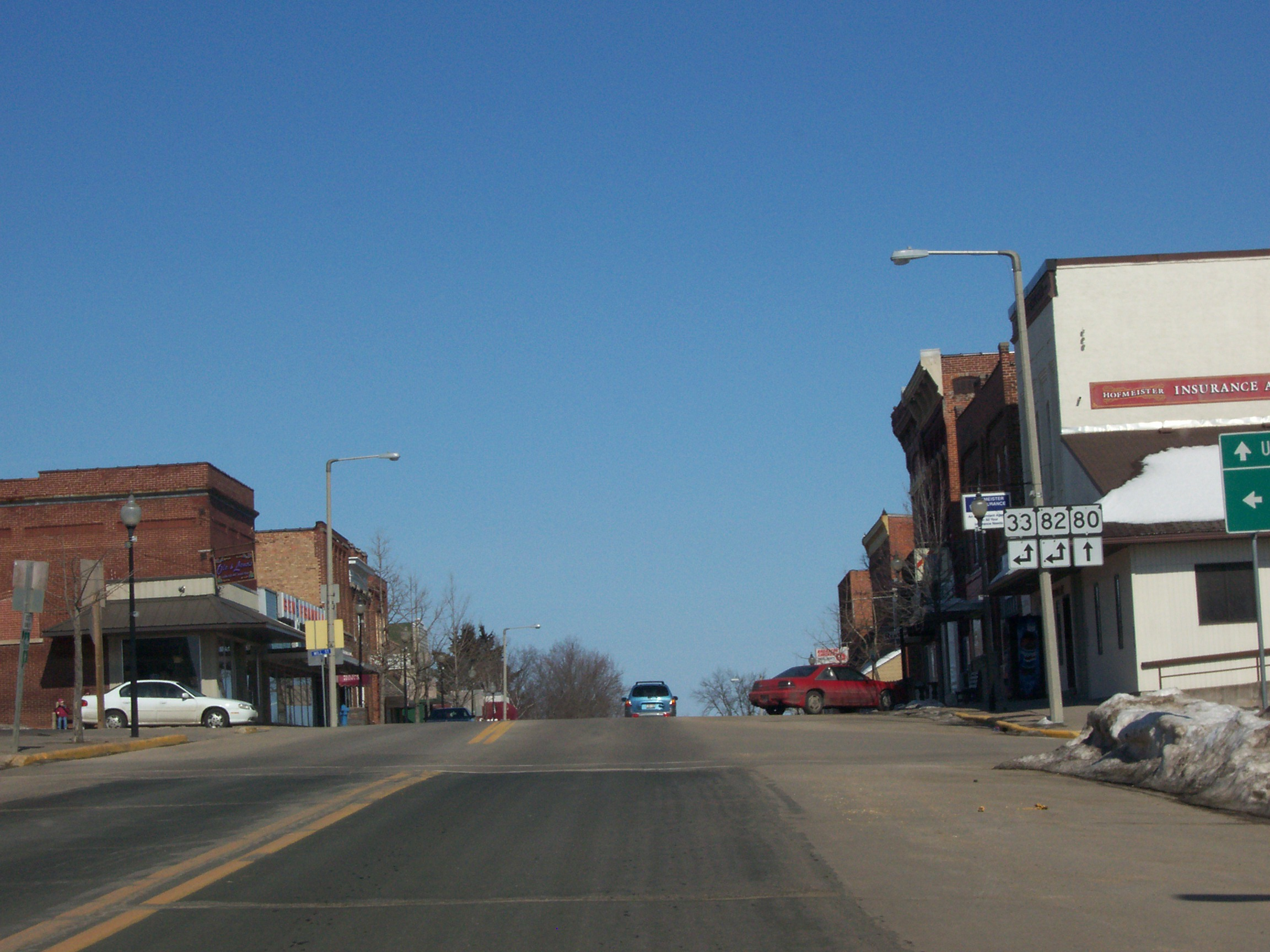
Intersection with WIS 82 and WIS 33 in Hillsboro

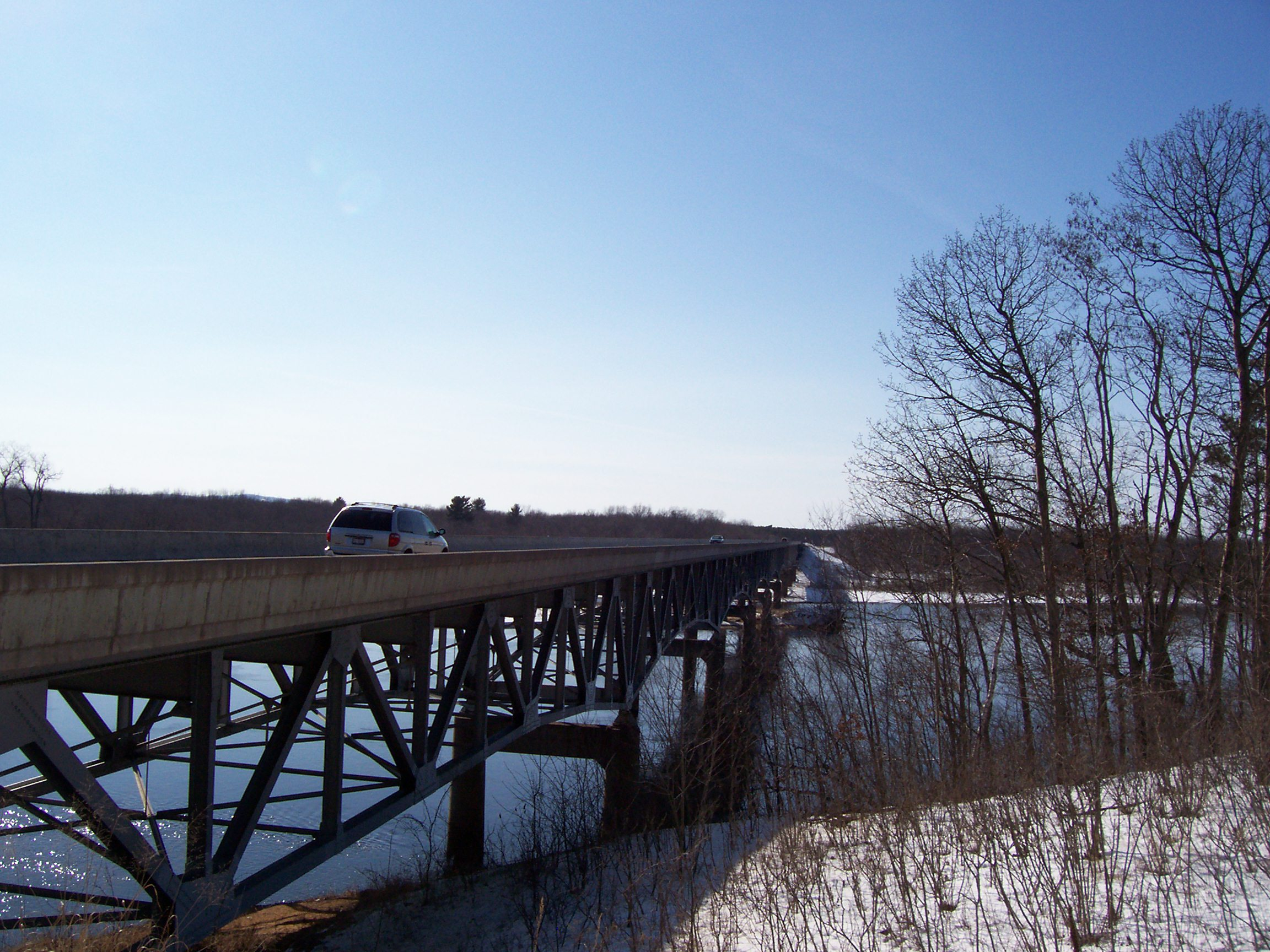
WIS 82 crossing the Wisconsin River between Mauston and Oxford

== Major intersections ==
County	Location	mi	km	Destinations	Notes
Mississippi River		0.00	0.00	Iowa 9 west – Lansing, Waukon Iowa 26 north – New Albin	Continuation into Iowa
Mississippi River		0.00	0.00	Black Hawk Bridge; Iowa–Wisconsin state line	
Crawford	Town of Freeman			WIS 35 south / Great River Road south – Prairie du Chien	Southern end of WIS 35 overlap
Crawford	De Soto			WIS 35 north / Great River Road north – Genoa	Northern end of WIS 35 overlap
Vernon	Town of Franklin			WIS 27 – Mount Sterling	Southern end of WIS 27 overlap
Vernon	Town of Franklin			US 14 east / US 61 south – Madison	Southern end of US 14 / US 61 overlap
Vernon	Viroqua			US 14 west / US 61 north / WIS 27 north – Westby, La Crosse WIS 56 west – Genoa	Northern end of US 14 / US 61 and WIS 27 overlaps; western end of WIS 56 overlap
Vernon	Town of Viroqua			WIS 56 east – Viola	Eastern end of WIS 56 overlap
Vernon	La Farge			WIS 131 north – Ontario	Western end of WIS 131 overlap
Vernon	La Farge			WIS 131 south – Viola	Eastern end of WIS 131 overlap
Vernon	Town of Hillsboro			WIS 33 west – Ontario	Western end of WIS 33 overlap
Vernon	Hillsboro			WIS 80 south – Richland Center	Southern end of WIS 80 overlap
Juneau	Union Center			WIS 33 east – Wonewoc	Eastern end of WIS 33 overlap
Juneau	Elroy			WIS 71 west – Kendall	
Juneau	Elroy			WIS 80 north – New Lisbon	Northern end of WIS 80 overlap
Juneau	Mauston			WIS 58 south – La Valle	Roundabout; southern end of WIS 58 overlap
Juneau	Mauston			US 12 / WIS 16 (Main Street) – New Lisbon, Wisconsin Dells	
Juneau	Mauston			WIS 58 north – Necedah	Northern end of WIS 58 overlap
Juneau	Mauston			I-90 / I-94 – Tomah, Madison	
Adams	Town of Springville			WIS 13 – Adams, Wisconsin Dells	
Marquette	Oxford–Packwaukee town line			I-39 / US 51 / WIS 23 west – Portage, Wisconsin Dells, Stevens Point WIS 23 east – Montello	Roadway continues as eastbound WIS 23
1.000 mi = 1.609 km; 1.000 km = 0.621 mi: Concurrency terminus
