= Melrose, Wisconsin =

- Village
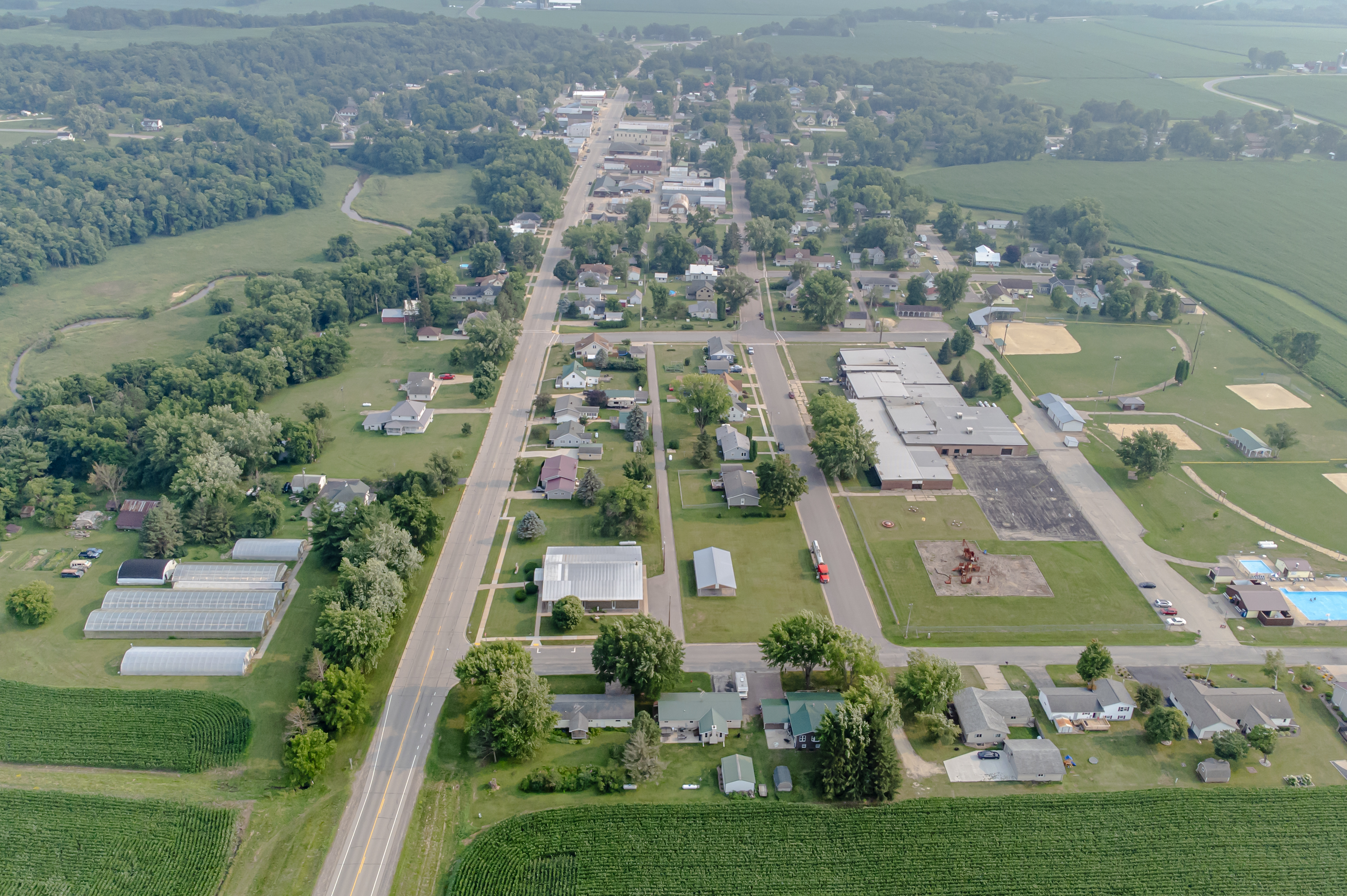
- Looking south

- Location of Melrose in Jackson County, Wisconsin.
- Coordinates: 44°7′8″N 91°0′1″W
- Country: United States
- State: Wisconsin
- County: Jackson

Area
  - Total: 0.83 sq mi (2.16 km^{2})
  - Land: 0.80 sq mi (2.07 km^{2})
  - Water: 0.031 sq mi (0.08 km^{2})
- Elevation: 761 ft (232 m)

Population (2020)
  - Total: 544
  - Density: 595.7/sq mi (229.99/km^{2})
- Time zone: UTC-6 (Central (CST))
  - Summer (DST): UTC-5 (CDT)
- Area code: 608
- FIPS code: 55-50775
- GNIS feature ID: 1569326
- Website: https://melrosewi.gov/

Melrose is a village in Jackson County, Wisconsin, United States. The population was 544 at the 2020 census. The village is located within the Town of Melrose.

== Geography ==
Melrose is located at 44°07′55″N 90°59′45″W (44.131912, -90.995737).

According to the United States Census Bureau, the village has a total area of 0.84 square miles (2.18 km^{2}), of which 0.81 square miles (2.10 km^{2}) is land and 0.03 square miles (0.08 km^{2}) is water.

== Demographics ==
Historical population
Census	Pop.	Note	%±
1880	144		—
1920	445		—
1930	480		7.9%
1940	462		−3.7%
1950	497		7.6%
1960	516		3.8%
1970	505		−2.1%
1980	507		0.4%
1990	551		8.7%
2000	529		−4.0%
2010	503		−4.9%
2020	544		8.2%
U.S. Decennial Census

=== 2010 census ===
As of the census of 2010, there were 503 people, 212 households, and 137 families living in the village. The population density was 621.0 inhabitants per square mile (239.8/km^{2}). There were 250 housing units at an average density of 308.6 per square mile (119.2/km^{2}). The racial makeup of the village was 97.0% White, 0.2% African American, 0.2% Native American, 0.2% Asian, 0.6% Pacific Islander, 1.6% from other races, and 0.2% from two or more races. Hispanic or Latino of any race were 1.8% of the population.

There were 212 households, of which 30.7% had children under the age of 18 living with them, 49.5% were married couples living together, 11.3% had a female householder with no husband present, 3.8% had a male householder with no wife present, and 35.4% were non-families. 27.8% of all households were made up of individuals, and 16% had someone living alone who was 65 years of age or older. The average household size was 2.37 and the average family size was 2.93.

The median age in the village was 40.6 years. 24.7% of residents were under the age of 18; 7.7% were between the ages of 18 and 24; 23.2% were from 25 to 44; 25.1% were from 45 to 64; and 19.7% were 65 years of age or older. The gender makeup of the village was 48.5% male and 51.5% female.

=== 2000 census ===
As of the census of 2000, there were 529 people, 218 households, and 139 families living in the village. The population density was 670.1 people per square mile (258.5/km^{2}). There were 229 housing units at an average density of 290.1 per square mile (111.9/km^{2}). The racial makeup of the village was 99.05% White, 0.19% Pacific Islander, and 0.76% from two or more races. 0.76% of the population were Hispanic or Latino of any race.

There were 218 households, out of which 28.9% had children under the age of 18 living with them, 53.2% were married couples living together, 8.7% had a female householder with no husband present, and 35.8% were non-families. 30.7% of all households were made up of individuals, and 19.7% had someone living alone who was 65 years of age or older. The average household size was 2.43 and the average family size was 3.06.

In the village, the population was spread out, with 25.9% under the age of 18, 5.7% from 18 to 24, 26.7% from 25 to 44, 18.5% from 45 to 64, and 23.3% who were 65 years of age or older. The median age was 40 years. For every 100 females, there were 98.9 males. For every 100 females age 18 and over, there were 81.5 males.

The median income for a household in the village was $37,955, and the median income for a family was $45,938. Males had a median income of $28,333 versus $21,667 for females. The per capita income for the village was $18,765. None of the families and 3.4% of the population were living below the poverty line, including no under eighteens and 11.7% of those over 64.

== Education ==
Melrose, along with Mindoro and several other villages in the area are served by the Melrose-Mindoro Area School District.

== Transportation ==
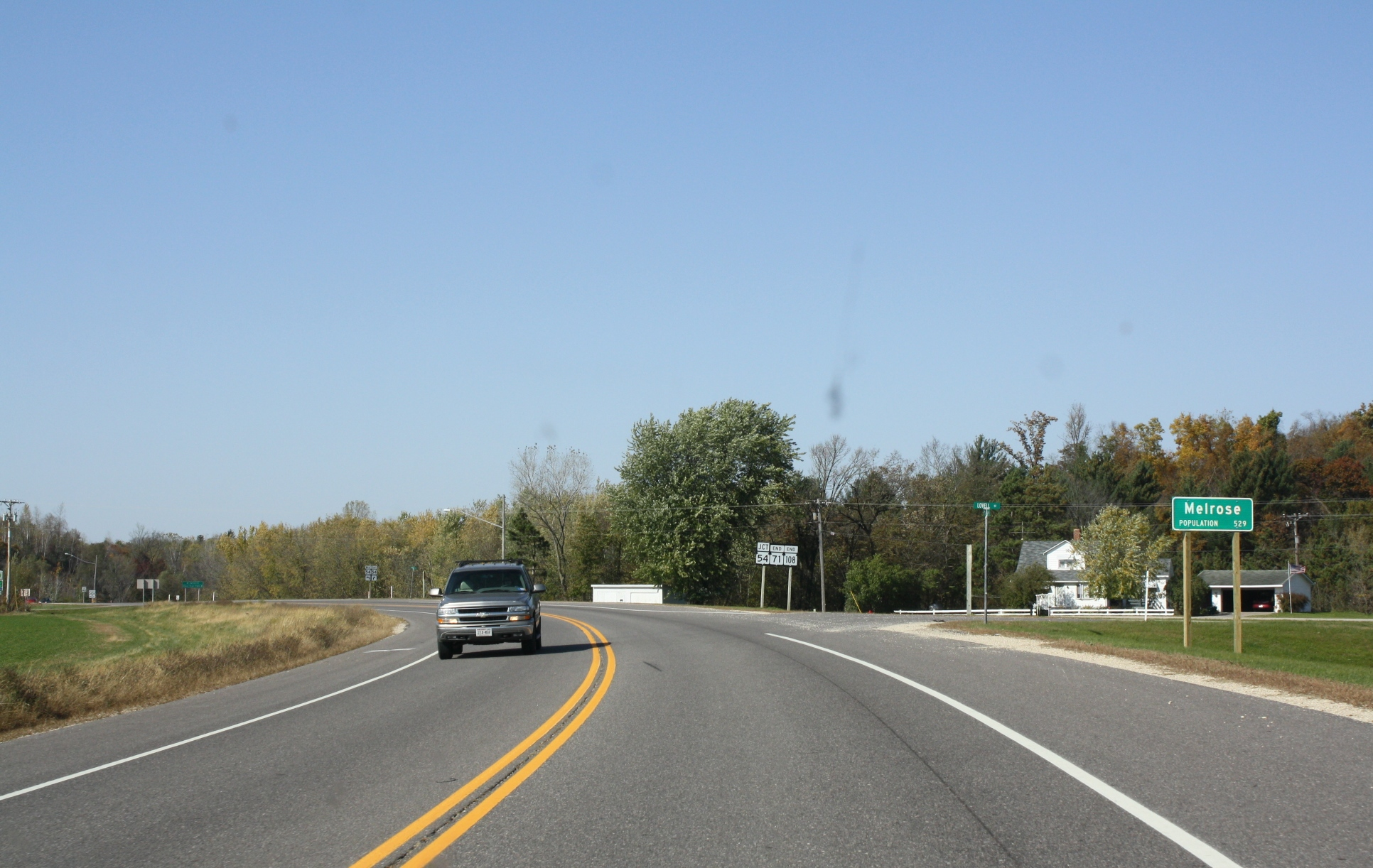
Looking north at the termini for WIS 71 and WIS 108.

Wisconsin Highway 54 travels northeast–southwest through Melrose. The northern termini of Wisconsin Highway 71 and Wisconsin Highway 108 are located in Melrose as the highways come from the south.

== Gallery ==
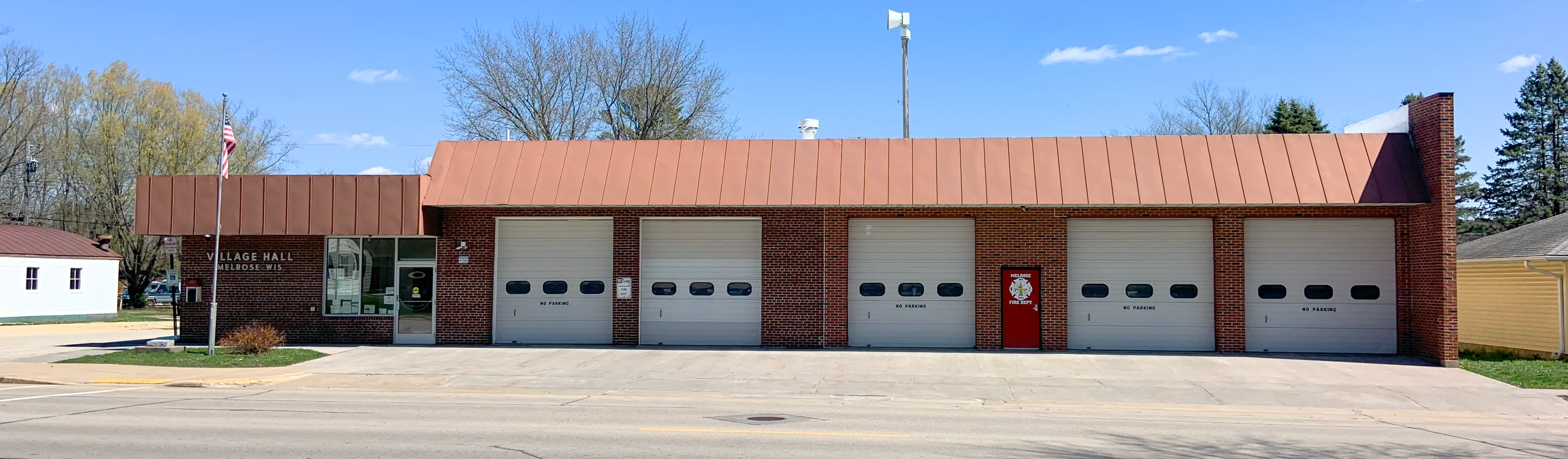
Melrose Village Hall

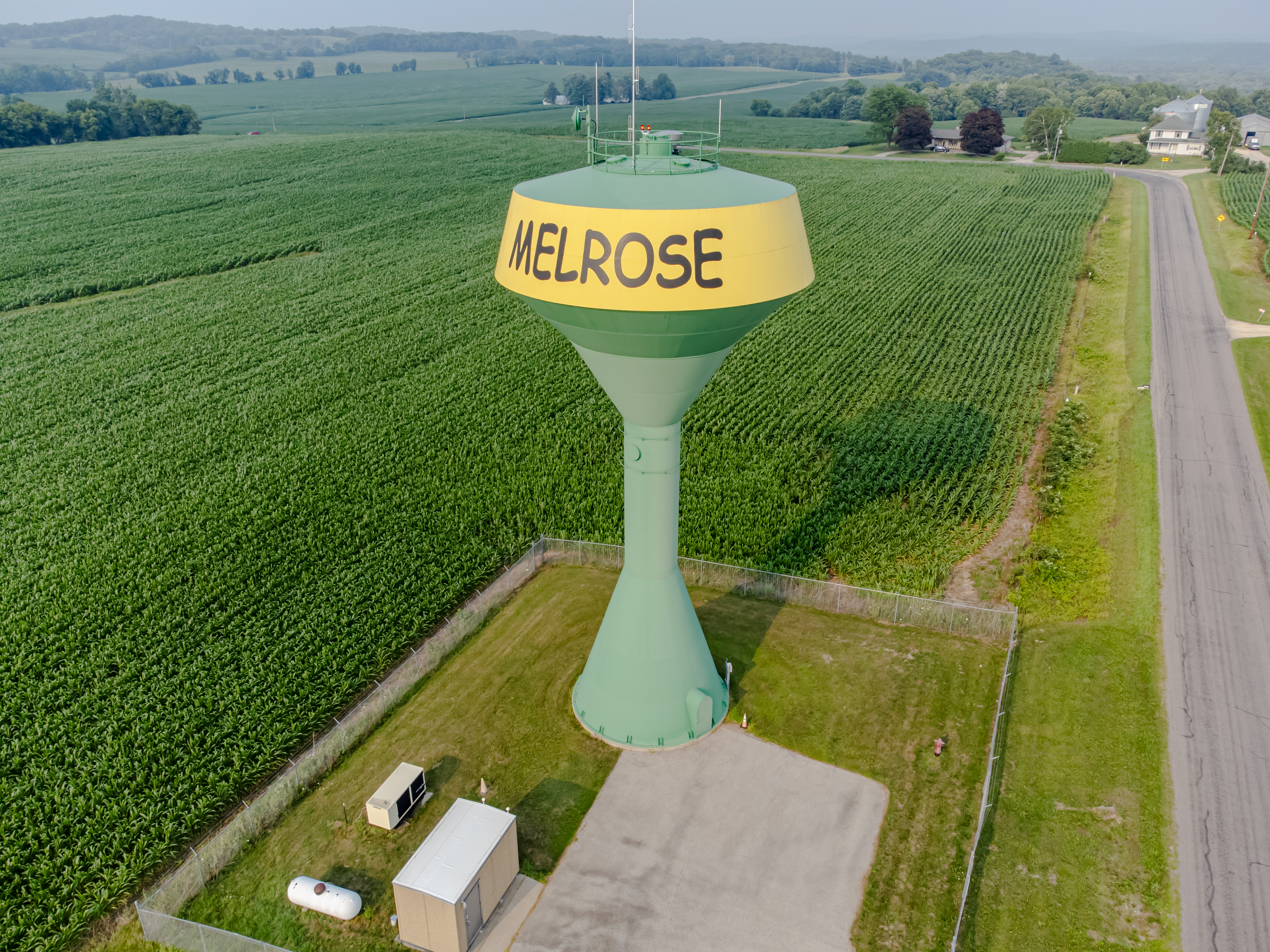
Melrose water tower

== See also ==
- Mindoro, Wisconsin
- Melrose-Mindoro High School
