= Wells, Wisconsin =

- Town
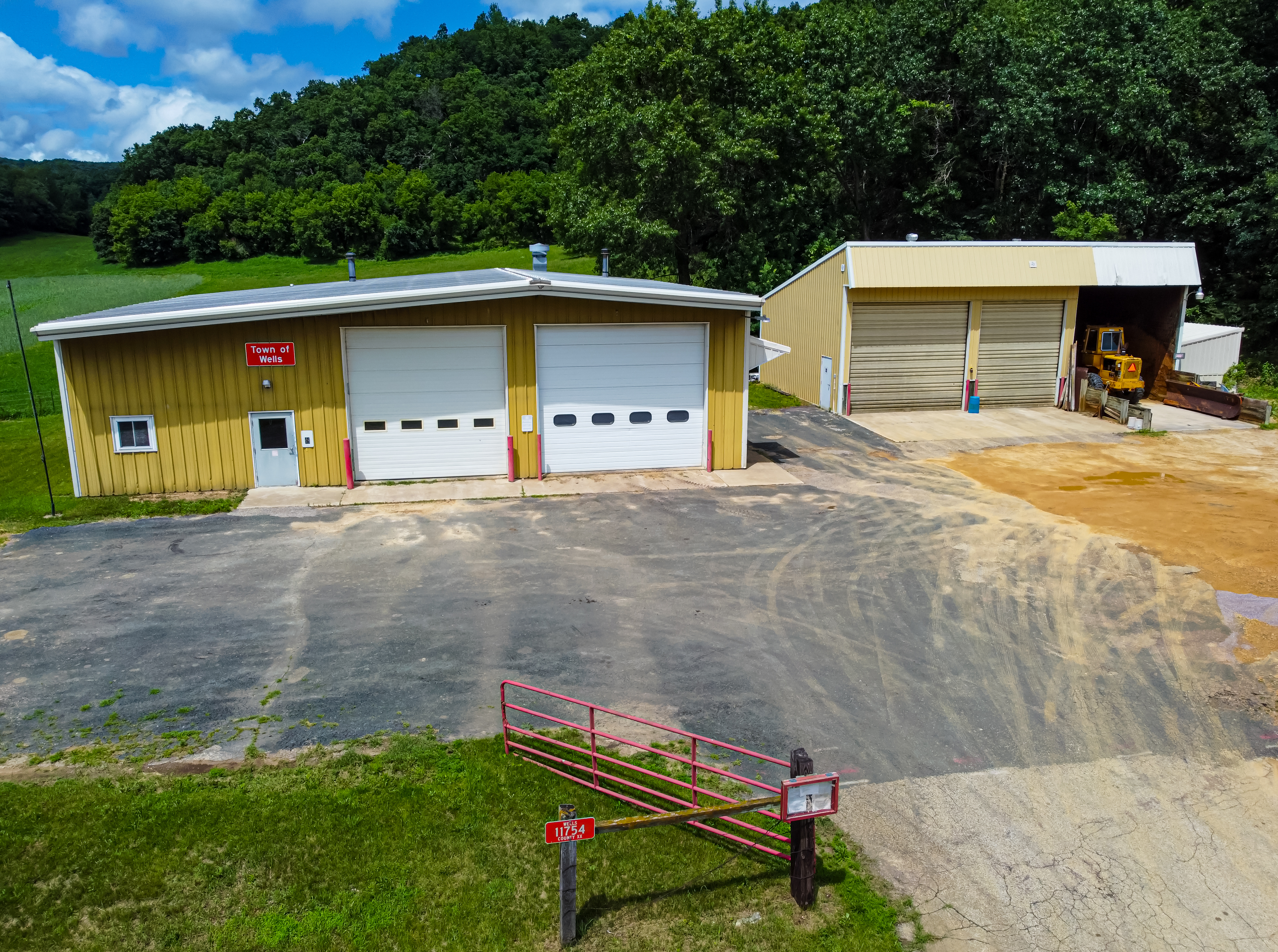
- Town hall

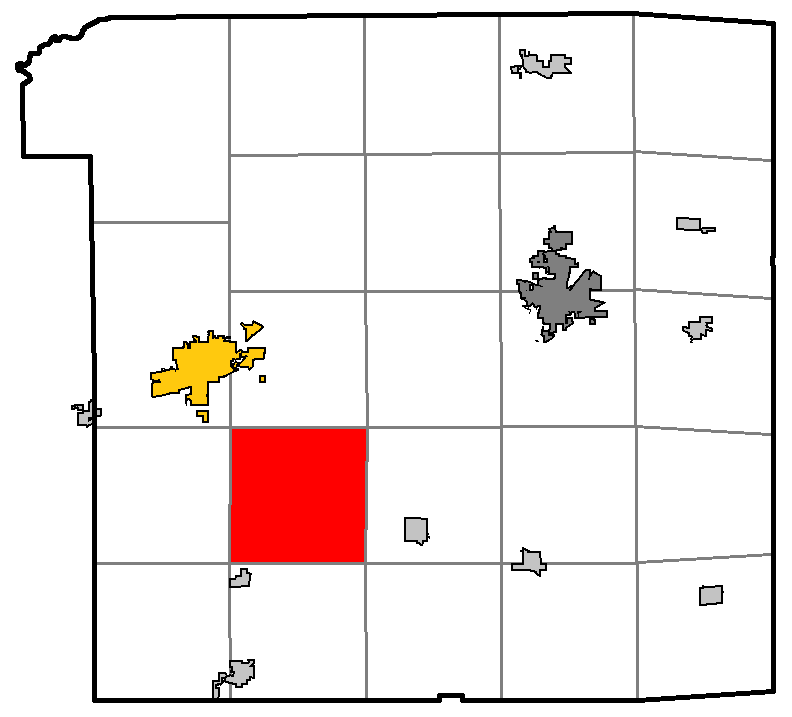
- Location of Wells, Monroe County

- Location of Monroe County, Wisconsin
- Coordinates: 43°50′41″N 90°42′56″W
- Country: United States
- State: Wisconsin
- County: Monroe

Area
  - Total: 35.7 sq mi (92.5 km^{2})
  - Land: 35.7 sq mi (92.5 km^{2})
  - Water: 0 sq mi (0.0 km^{2})
- Elevation: 1,322 ft (403 m)

Population (2020)
  - Total: 562
  - Density: 15.7/sq mi (6.08/km^{2})
- Time zone: UTC-6 (Central (CST))
  - Summer (DST): UTC-5 (CDT)
- Area code: 608
- FIPS code: 55-85150
- GNIS feature ID: 1584395
- Website: https://www.townofwellswi.com/

Wells is a town in Monroe County, Wisconsin, United States. The population was 562 at the time of the 2020 census. The unincorporated community of Farmers Valley is located partially in the town. The town was named for James Wells, a prominent early settler and the first town chair.

== Geography ==
According to the United States Census Bureau, the town has a total area of 35.7 square miles (92.5 km^{2}), all land.

== Demographics ==
As of the census of 2000, there were 529 people, 180 households, and 149 families residing in the town. The population density was 14.8 people per square mile (5.7/km^{2}). There were 191 housing units at an average density of 5.3 per square mile (2.1/km^{2}). The racial makeup of the town was 99.43% White, 0.19% Asian, and 0.38% from two or more races. Hispanic or Latino of any race were 1.89% of the population.

There were 180 households, out of which 40.6% had children under the age of 18 living with them, 68.9% were married couples living together, 7.2% had a female householder with no husband present, and 17.2% were non-families. 13.3% of all households were made up of individuals, and 3.3% had someone living alone who was 65 years of age or older. The average household size was 2.94 and the average family size was 3.19.

In the town, the population was spread out, with 28.5% under the age of 18, 7.9% from 18 to 24, 28.4% from 25 to 44, 25.7% from 45 to 64, and 9.5% who were 65 years of age or older. The median age was 36 years. For every 100 females, there were 111.6 males. For every 100 females age 18 and over, there were 112.4 males.

The median income for a household in the town was $37,614, and the median income for a family was $38,750. Males had a median income of $26,339 versus $17,333 for females. The per capita income for the town was $14,669. About 10.6% of families and 10.7% of the population were below the poverty line, including 13.0% of those under age 18 and none of those age 65 or over.

== See also ==
- List of towns in Wisconsin
