= Ridgeville, Wisconsin =

Town of Ridgeville
- Town
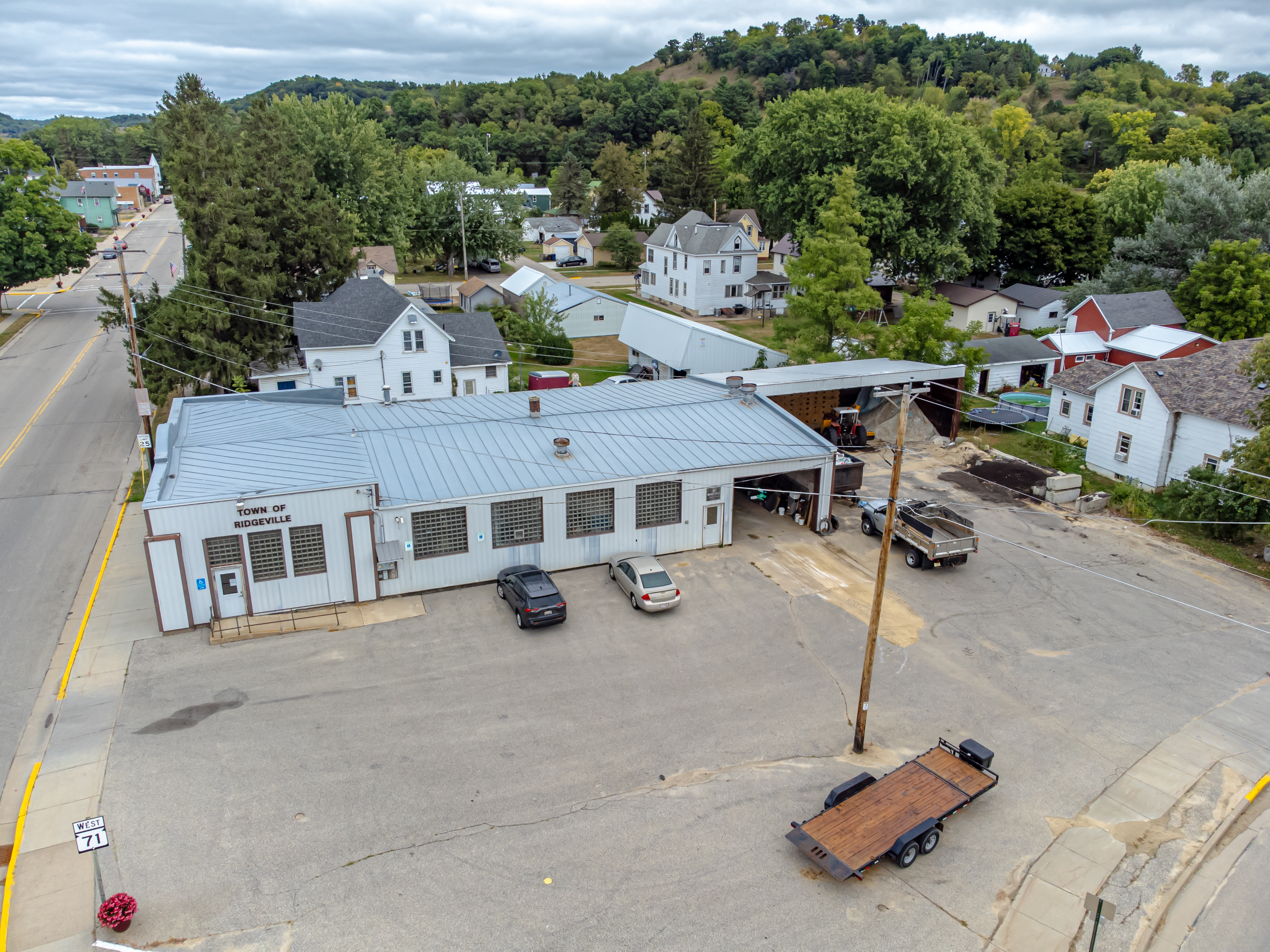
- Town hall in Norwalk

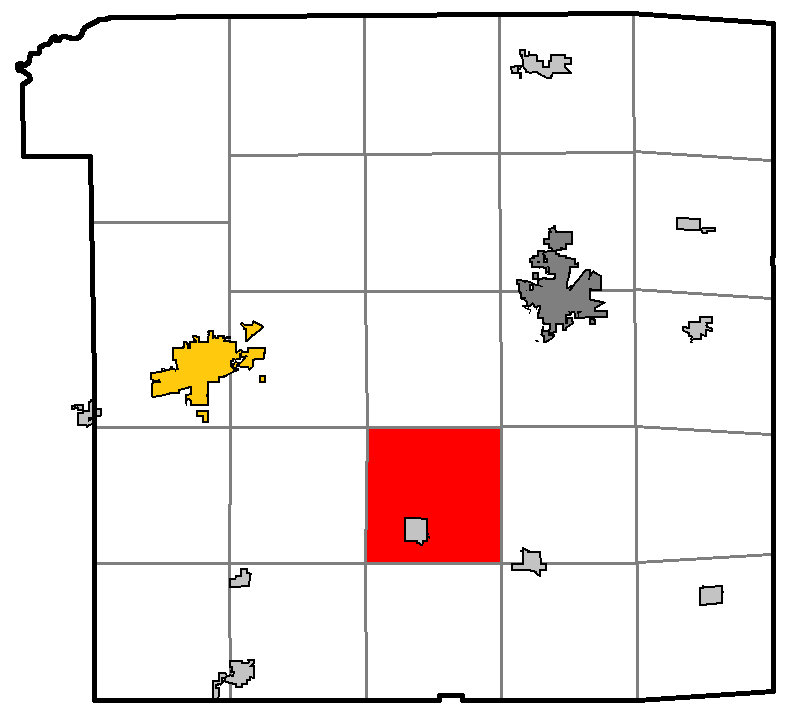
- Location of the Town of Ridgeville, Monroe County

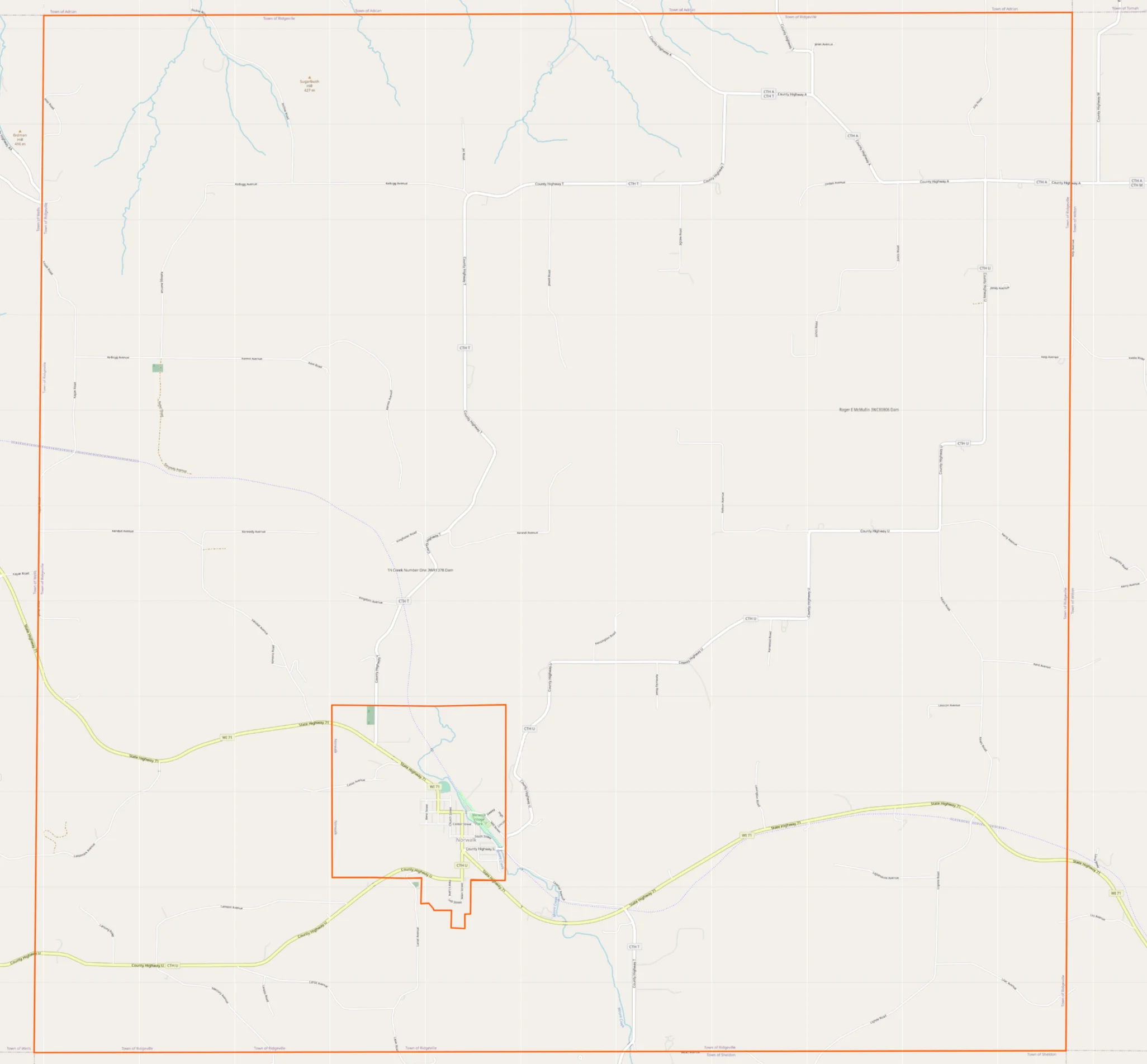
- Coordinates: 43°50′26″N 90°35′16″W
- Country: United States
- State: Wisconsin
- County: Monroe

Area
  - Total: 34.2 sq mi (88.7 km^{2})
  - Land: 34.2 sq mi (88.6 km^{2})
  - Water: 0.039 sq mi (0.1 km^{2})
- Elevation: 1,080 ft (330 m)

Population (2020)
  - Total: 479
  - Density: 14.0/sq mi (5.41/km^{2})
- Time zone: UTC-6 (Central (CST))
  - Summer (DST): UTC-5 (CDT)
- Area code: 608
- FIPS code: 55-67850
- GNIS feature ID: 1584033
- Website: https://ridgevilletown.com/

The Town of Ridgeville is located in Monroe County, Wisconsin, United States. The population was 479 at the 2020 census.

== Geography ==
According to the United States Census Bureau, the town has a total area of 34.2 square miles (88.7 km^{2}), of which 34.2 square miles (88.6 km^{2}) is land and 0.04 square mile (0.1 km^{2}) (0.12%) is water.

== Demographics ==
As of the census of 2000, there were 491 people, 159 households, and 131 families residing in the town. The population density was 14.4 people per square mile (5.5/km^{2}). There were 183 housing units at an average density of 5.4 per square mile (2.1/km^{2}). The racial makeup of the town was 97.35% White, 0.41% Native American, 0.20% Asian, 2.04% from other races. Hispanic or Latino of any race were 4.07% of the population.

There were 159 households, out of which 41.5% had children under the age of 18 living with them, 67.9% were married couples living together, 8.2% had a female householder with no husband present, and 17.6% were non-families. 15.1% of all households were made up of individuals, and 4.4% had someone living alone who was 65 years of age or older. The average household size was 3.09 and the average family size was 3.39.

In the town, the population was spread out, with 30.8% under the age of 18, 8.6% from 18 to 24, 27.9% from 25 to 44, 21.8% from 45 to 64, and 11.0% who were 65 years of age or older. The median age was 35 years. For every 100 females, there were 115.4 males. For every 100 females age 18 and over, there were 111.2 males.

The median income for a household in the town was $35,000, and the median income for a family was $38,125. Males had a median income of $25,288 versus $21,111 for females. The per capita income for the town was $15,499. About 20.1% of families and 20.6% of the population were below the poverty line, including 32.2% of those under age 18 and 3.7% of those age 65 or over.
