= Melrose (town), Wisconsin =

Town in Jackson County, Wisconsin

Melrose, Wisconsin
- Town
- Town of Melrose
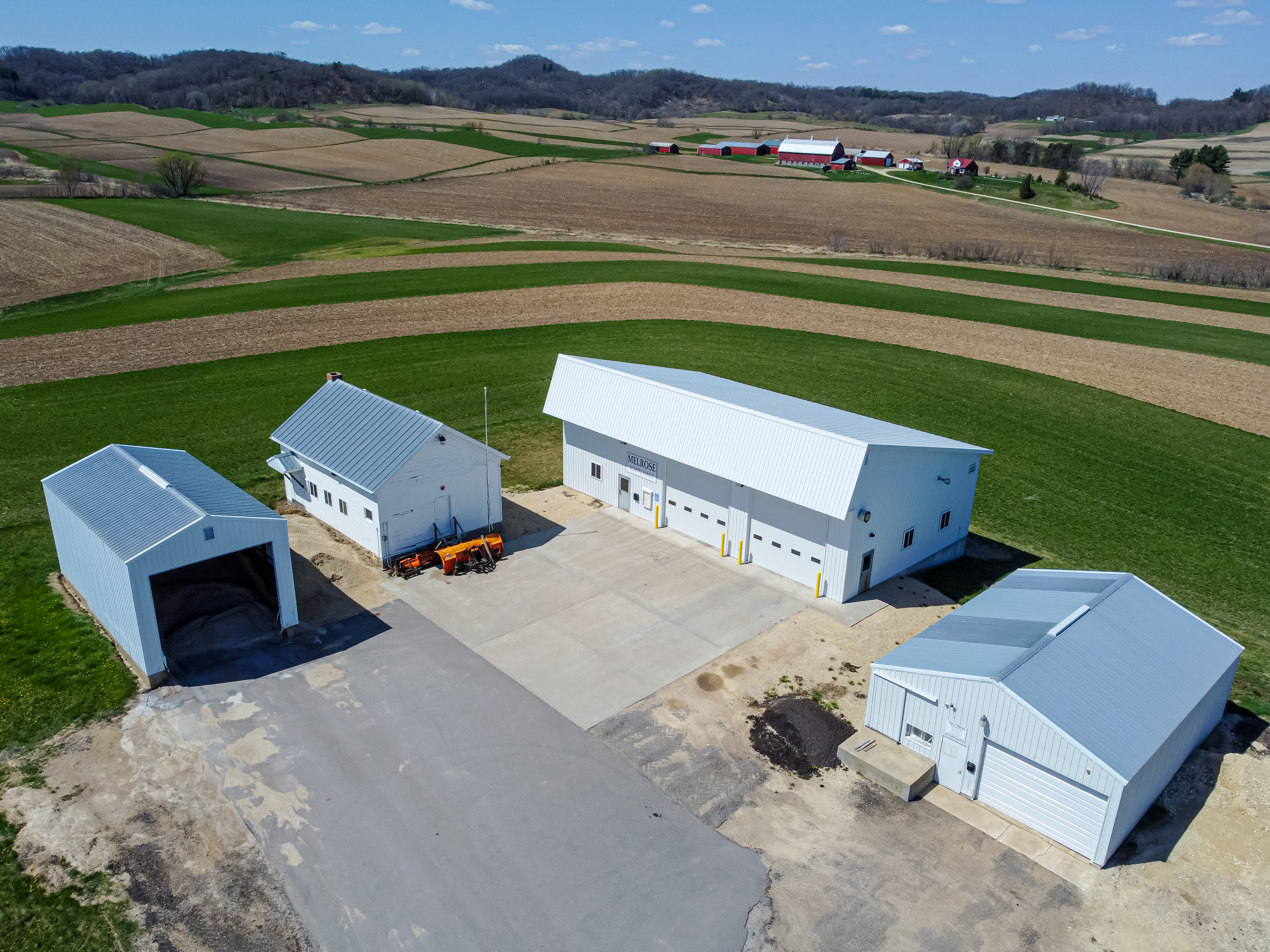
- Melrose Town Hall

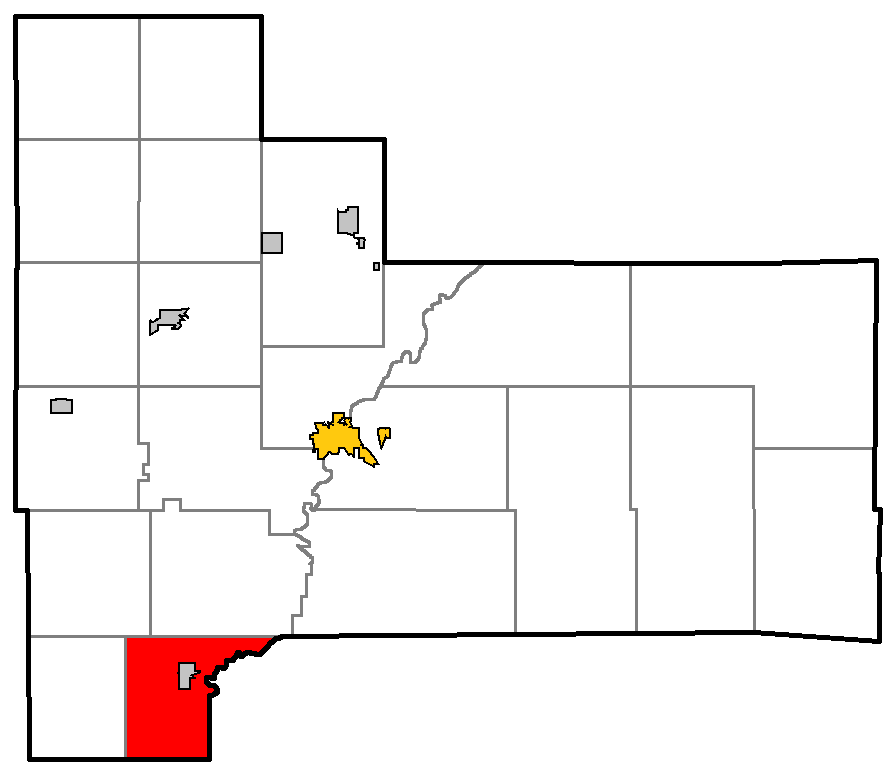
- Location of Melrose, Jackson County

- Location of Jackson County, Wisconsin
- Coordinates: 44°06′59″N 91°00′34″W
- Country: United States
- State: Wisconsin
- County: Jackson

Area
  - Total: 27.66 sq mi (71.6 km^{2})
  - Land: 26.96 sq mi (69.8 km^{2})
  - Water: 0.70 sq mi (1.8 km^{2})

Population (2020)
  - Total: 470
  - Density: 17/sq mi (6.7/km^{2})
- Time zone: UTC-6 (Central (CST))
  - Summer (DST): UTC-5 (CDT)
- Area code(s): 608 and 353
- GNIS feature ID: 1569326
- Website: https://www.townofmelrose.org/

Melrose is a town in Jackson County, Wisconsin, United States. The population was 470 at the 2020 census. The Village of Melrose is located within the town.

== Geography ==
According to the United States Census Bureau, the town has a total area of 27.5 square miles (71.3 km^{2}), of which 26.9 square miles (69.6 km^{2}) is land and 0.6 square mile (1.7 km^{2}) (2.36%) is water.

== Demographics ==
As of the census of 2000, there were 402 people, 153 households, and 121 families residing in the town. The population density was 15.0 people per square mile (5.8/km^{2}). There were 169 housing units at an average density of 6.3 per square mile (2.4/km^{2}). The racial makeup of the town was 99.75% White, and 0.25% from two or more races. 0.00% of the population were Hispanic or Latino of any race.

There were 153 households, out of which 36.6% had children under the age of 18 living with them, 68.0% were married couples living together, 4.6% had a female householder with no husband present, and 20.9% were non-families. 17.6% of all households were made up of individuals, and 7.2% had someone living alone who was 65 years of age or older. The average household size was 2.63 and the average family size was 2.97.

In the town, the population was spread out, with 26.9% under the age of 18, 4.7% from 18 to 24, 33.6% from 25 to 44, 23.1% from 45 to 64, and 11.7% who were 65 years of age or older. The median age was 39 years. For every 100 females, there were 110.5 males. For every 100 females age 18 and over, there were 116.2 males.

The median income for a household in the town was $34,375, and the median income for a family was $39,167. Males had a median income of $25,556 versus $21,667 for females. The per capita income for the town was $16,861. About 9.4% of families and 12.7% of the population were below the poverty line, including 18.3% of those under age 18 and none of those age 65 or over.

== Notable people ==
- Mark Douglas, Wisconsin legislator, farmer, and businessman, lived in Melrose
- Robert D. Wilson, Wisconsin legislator and farmer, lived in Melrose
