= Union Center, Wisconsin =

- Village
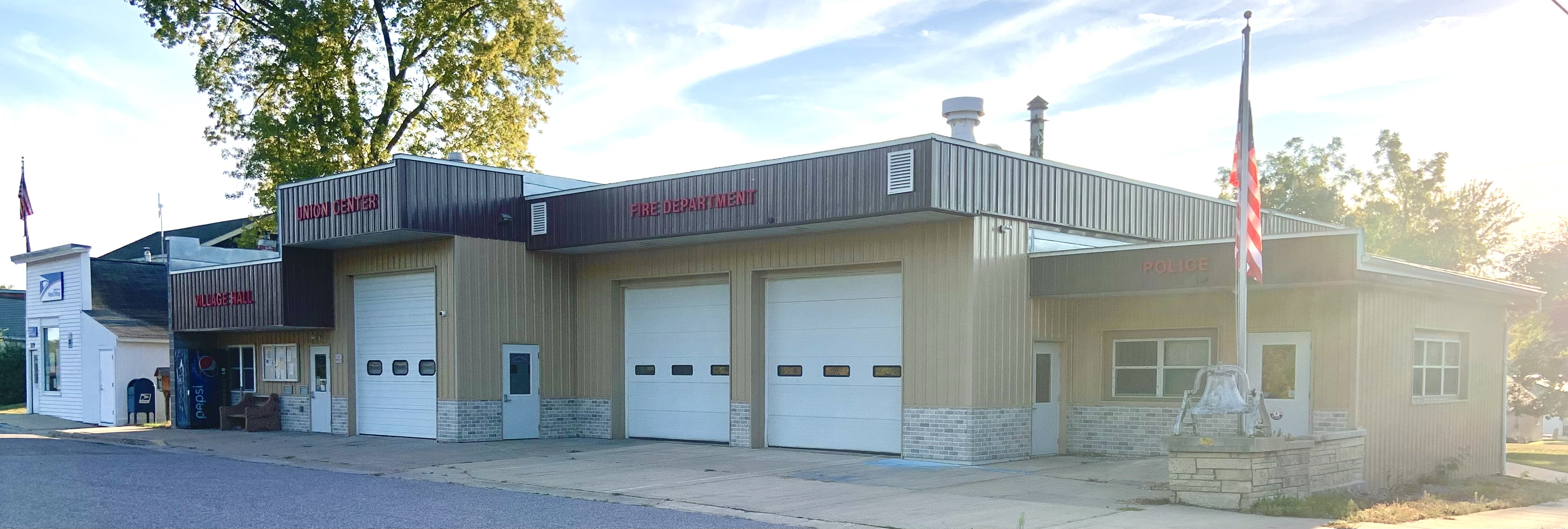
- Village hall

- Location of Union Center in Juneau County, Wisconsin.
- Coordinates: 43°41′3″N 90°15′50″W
- Country: United States
- State: Wisconsin
- County: Juneau

Area
  - Total: 0.83 sq mi (2.14 km^{2})
  - Land: 0.83 sq mi (2.14 km^{2})
  - Water: 0 sq mi (0.00 km^{2})
- Elevation: 925 ft (282 m)

Population (2020)
  - Total: 225
  - Density: 272/sq mi (105/km^{2})
- Time zone: UTC-6 (Central (CST))
  - Summer (DST): UTC-5 (CDT)
- Area code: 608
- FIPS code: 55-81725
- GNIS feature ID: 1575898
- Website: http://www.villageofuc.com/

Union Center is a village in Juneau County, Wisconsin, United States, along the Baraboo River. The population was 225 at the 2020 census.

== History ==
Originally called Union, the village was named for the federal union of the United States. A post office called Union Center has been in operation since 1859.

An EF3 tornado caused intense damage in and around the town on April 14, 2026. This tornado destroyed homes, outbuildings and trees. This tornado was also part of a larger tornado outbreak that had multiple other significant tornadoes.

== Geography ==
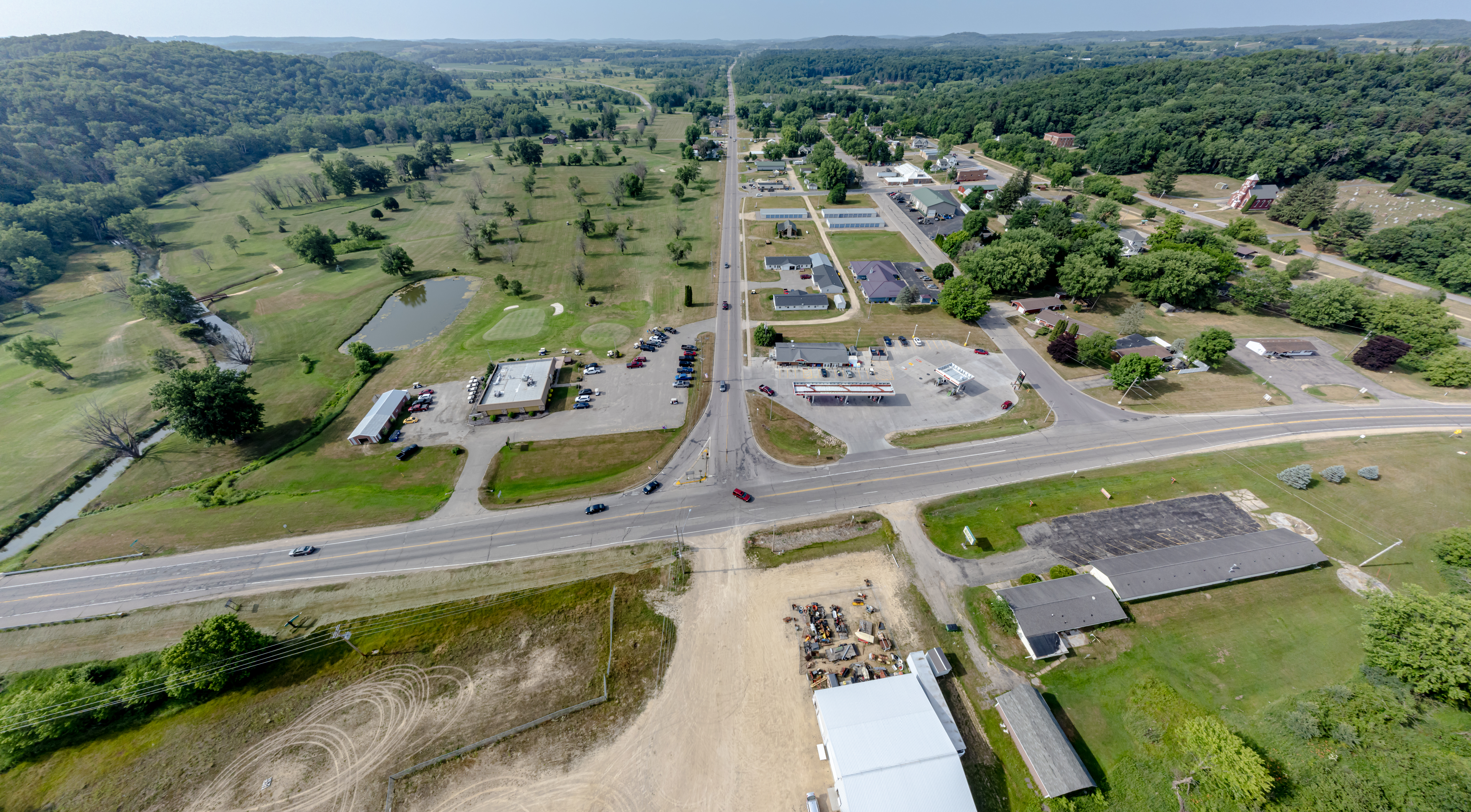

Union Center is located at 43°41′3″N 90°15′50″W (43.684067, -90.263841).

According to the United States Census Bureau, the village has a total area of 0.75 square miles (1.94 km^{2}), all land.

== Demographics ==
Historical population
Census	Pop.	Note	%±
1920	170		—
1930	157		−7.6%
1940	190		21.0%
1950	261		37.4%
1960	252		−3.4%
1970	205		−18.7%
1980	216		5.4%
1990	197		−8.8%
2000	214		8.6%
2010	200		−6.5%
2020	225		12.5%
U.S. Decennial Census

=== 2010 census ===
As of the census of 2010, there were 200 people, 95 households, and 58 families living in the village. The population density was 266.7 inhabitants per square mile (103.0/km^{2}). There were 109 housing units at an average density of 145.3 per square mile (56.1/km^{2}). The racial makeup of the village was 98.5% White and 1.5% Asian. Hispanic or Latino of any race were 0.5% of the population.

There were 95 households, of which 21.1% had children under the age of 18 living with them, 50.5% were married couples living together, 4.2% had a female householder with no husband present, 6.3% had a male householder with no wife present, and 38.9% were non-families. 32.6% of all households were made up of individuals, and 16.9% had someone living alone who was 65 years of age or older. The average household size was 2.11 and the average family size was 2.57.

The median age in the village was 49 years. 15.5% of residents were under the age of 18; 7.5% were between the ages of 18 and 24; 18% were from 25 to 44; 37% were from 45 to 64; and 22% were 65 years of age or older. The gender makeup of the village was 47.0% male and 53.0% female.

=== 2000 census ===
As of the census of 2000, there were 214 people, 94 households, and 59 families living in the village. The population density was 267.1 people per square mile (103.3/km^{2}). There were 99 housing units at an average density of 123.6 per square mile (47.8/km^{2}). The racial makeup of the village was 99.07% White, and 0.93% from two or more races. Hispanic or Latino of any race were 1.40% of the population.

There were 94 households, out of which 25.5% had children under the age of 18 living with them, 47.9% were married couples living together, 13.8% had a female householder with no husband present, and 36.2% were non-families. 31.9% of all households were made up of individuals, and 18.1% had someone living alone who was 65 years of age or older. The average household size was 2.20 and the average family size was 2.77.

In the village, the population was spread out, with 21.5% under the age of 18, 2.8% from 18 to 24, 30.4% from 25 to 44, 25.2% from 45 to 64, and 20.1% who were 65 years of age or older. The median age was 43 years. For every 100 females, there were 94.5 males. For every 100 females age 18 and over, there were 86.7 males.

The median income for a household in the village was $34,063, and the median income for a family was $48,750. Males had a median income of $27,500 versus $23,750 for females. The per capita income for the village was $17,121. About 5.7% of families and 8.3% of the population were below the poverty line, including 6.7% of those under the age of eighteen and none of those 65 or over.
