= Lock and Dam No. 7 =

Dam in Minnesota and Wisconsin, U.S.

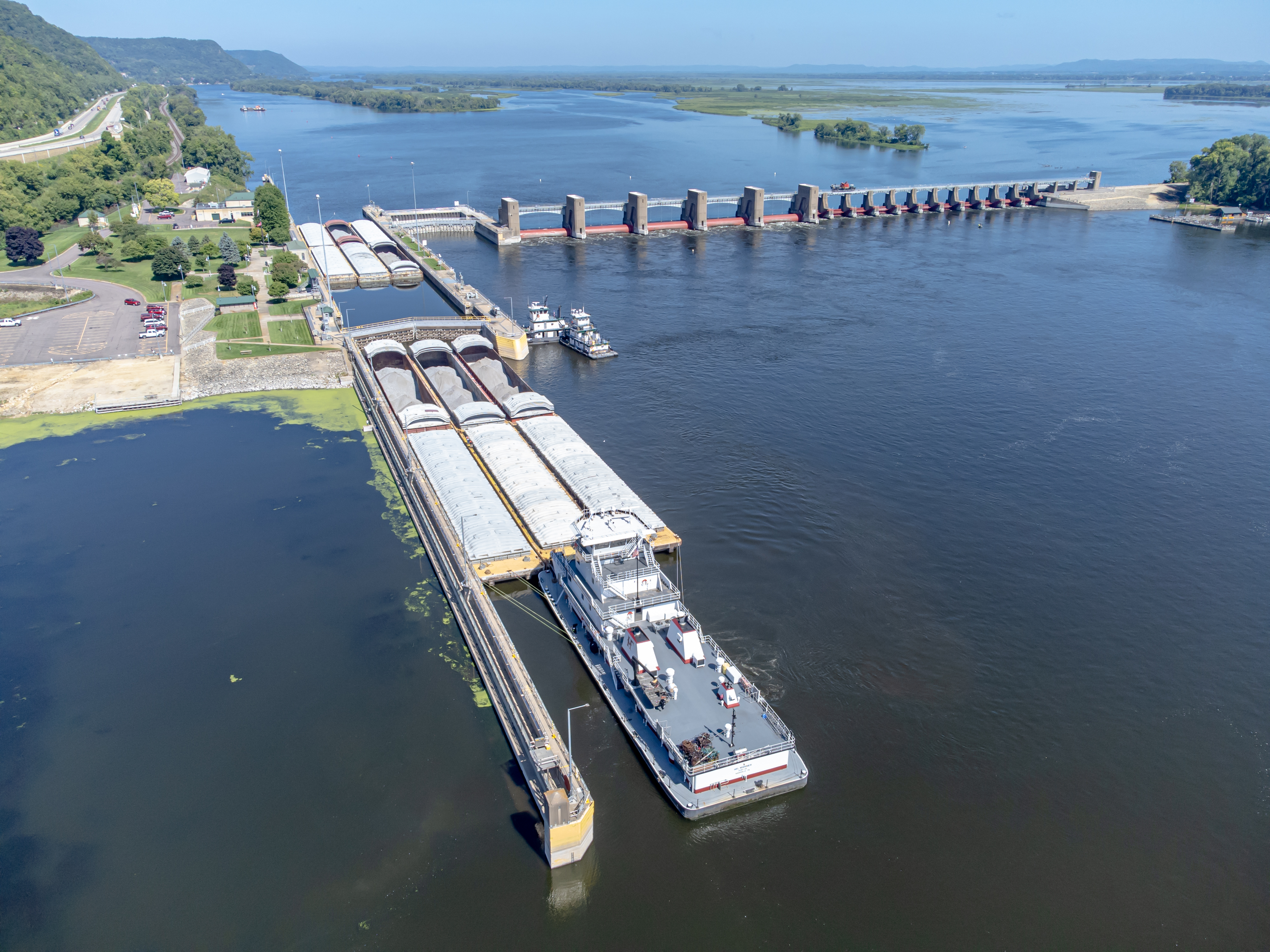
- Mississippi River Lock and Dam No. 7

- Location of the Lock and Dam No. 7 on the border of Minnesota and Wisconsin
- Country: United States
- Location: Winona County, Minnesota; La Crosse County, Wisconsin near La Crescent, Minnesota
- Coordinates: 43°52′01″N 91°18′26″W
- Purpose: Navigation
- Status: In use
- Construction began: 1933; 93 years ago
- Opening date: April 1937; 89 years ago
- Operators: U.S. Army Corps of Engineers, St. Paul District

Dam and spillways
- Impounds: Upper Mississippi River
- Height (foundation): 41 ft (12 m)
- Length: 10,860 ft (3,310 m)
- Spillways: 2
- Spillway type: 5 Roller Gates; 11 Tainter Gates
- Spillway capacity: 273,000 acre⋅ft (0.337 km^{3})

Reservoir
- Creates: Lake Onalaska; Pool No. 7
- Total capacity: 5,000 acre⋅ft (0.0062 km^{3})
- Catchment area: 62,340 mi^{2} (161,500 km^{2})
- Surface area: 13,440 acres (54.4 km^{2})
- Normal elevation: 636 ft (194 m)

Power Station
- Hydraulic head: 25

Lock and Dam No. 7 is a lock and dam located on the Upper Mississippi River at river mile 702.5 near the cities of La Crescent, Minnesota and Onalaska, Wisconsin. It forms pool 7 and Lake Onalaska. The facility was constructed in the mid-1930s and placed in operation in April 1937. It underwent major rehabilitation from 1989 through 2002. The lock and dam are owned and operated by the St. Paul District of the United States Army Corps of Engineers-Mississippi Valley Division.

The lock and dam system consists of a concrete structure 940 feet (286.5 m) long with five roller gates and 11 tainter gates, a segment of earth embankment 8,100 feet (2,468.9 m) long from the dam to French Island separated by a concrete spillway 1,000 feet (304.8 m) long, and another embankment 2,400 feet (731.5 m) long from French Island to Onalaska which has a concrete spillway 670 feet (204.2 m) long. The lock is 110 feet (33.5 m) wide by 600 feet (182.9 m) long. The lock and dam is one of the most visited because of its proximity to Interstate 90, and is clearly visible to travelers crossing the I-90 Mississippi River Bridge.

== See also ==
- I-90 Mississippi River Bridge, just downstream.
- Upper Mississippi River National Wildlife and Fish Refuge
- Public Works Administration Dams List
