= Interstate 90 =

Interstate Highway across northern United States

Interstate 90
- I-90 highlighted in red

Route information
- Length: 3,099.74 mi (4,988.55 km)
- Existed: August 14, 1957–present
- NHS: Entire route

Major junctions
- West end: SR 519 in Seattle, Washington
- I-5 in Seattle, Washington; I-15 near Butte, Montana; I-25 near Buffalo, Wyoming; I-35 in Albert Lea, Minnesota; I-55 in Chicago, Illinois; I-65 in Gary, Indiana; I-80 / I-94 / US 6 in Lake Station, Indiana; I-75 in Rossford, Ohio; I-87 in Albany, New York; I-95 in Weston, Massachusetts
- East end: Route 1A in Boston, Massachusetts

Location
- Country: United States
- States: Washington, Idaho, Montana, Wyoming, South Dakota, Minnesota, Wisconsin, Illinois, Indiana, Ohio, Pennsylvania, New York, Massachusetts

Highway system
- Interstate Highway System; Main; Auxiliary; Suffixed; Business; Future

Interstate 90 (I-90) is an east–west transcontinental freeway and the longest Interstate Highway in the United States at 3,099.7 miles (4,988.5 km). It begins in Seattle, Washington, and travels through the Pacific Northwest, Mountain West, Great Plains, Midwest, and the Northeast, ending in Boston, Massachusetts. The highway serves 13 states and has 15 auxiliary routes, primarily in major cities such as Chicago, Cleveland, Buffalo, and Rochester.

I-90 begins at Washington State Route 519 in Seattle and crosses the Cascade Range in Washington and the Rocky Mountains in Montana. It then traverses the northern Great Plains and travels southeast through Wisconsin and the Chicago area by following the southern shore of Lake Michigan. The freeway continues across Indiana and follows the shore of Lake Erie through Ohio and Pennsylvania to Buffalo. I-90 travels across New York by roughly following the historic Erie Canal and traverses Massachusetts, reaching its eastern terminus at Massachusetts Route 1A near Logan International Airport in Boston.

The freeway was established by the Federal-Aid Highway Act of 1956, replacing a series of existing U.S. Highways that had been preceded by local roads and auto trails established in the early 20th century. I-90 was numbered in 1957, reflecting its status as the northernmost transcontinental route of the system, and construction was underway on several sections with funding from the Federal-Aid Highway Act.

The route also incorporates several toll roads that predate the Interstate Highway System, including the Jane Addams Memorial Tollway, Indiana Toll Road, Ohio Turnpike, New York State Thruway, and the Massachusetts Turnpike. These toll roads opened in the 1950s and were followed by toll-free sections in Pennsylvania and Wisconsin that were finished in the 1960s. The Midwestern sections of I-90 were fully completed in 1978, and most of the route between Seattle and South Dakota opened by 1987. The final section, near the western terminus in Seattle, opened in September 1993; an eastern extension in Boston was completed in 2003 as part of the Big Dig project.

== Route description ==
Lengths
	mi	km
WA	296.92	477.85
ID	73.55	118.37
MT	552.46	889.10
WY	208.80	336.03
SD	412.76	664.27
MN	275.70	443.70
WI	187.13	301.16
IL	123.89	199.38
IN	156.28	251.51
OH	244.75	393.89
PA	46.30	74.51
NY	385.48	620.37
MA	135.72	218.42
Total	3,099.74	4,988.55

I-90 is the longest Interstate Highway in the United States, spanning 3,099.74 miles (4,988.55 km) across the northern portion of the coterminous part of the country. The transcontinental freeway passes through 13 states in the Pacific Northwest, Mountain West, Great Plains, Midwest, and the Northeast regions of the United States. From the Wisconsin–Illinois state line to Massachusetts, approximately 760 miles (1,220 km) of I-90 uses turnpikes and other tolled highways with the exception of segments in Chicago, northeastern Ohio, Pennsylvania, and Albany, New York. The toll road sections comprise 25 percent of the freeway's total length.

According to 2011 data from the Federal Highway Administration, the busiest section of I-90 is in the Chicago area, where a daily average of 306,574 vehicles use the freeway. The lowest daily traffic counts on I-90 were recorded in Wyoming, where an average of 9,820 vehicles used rural sections of the freeway.

=== Washington ===
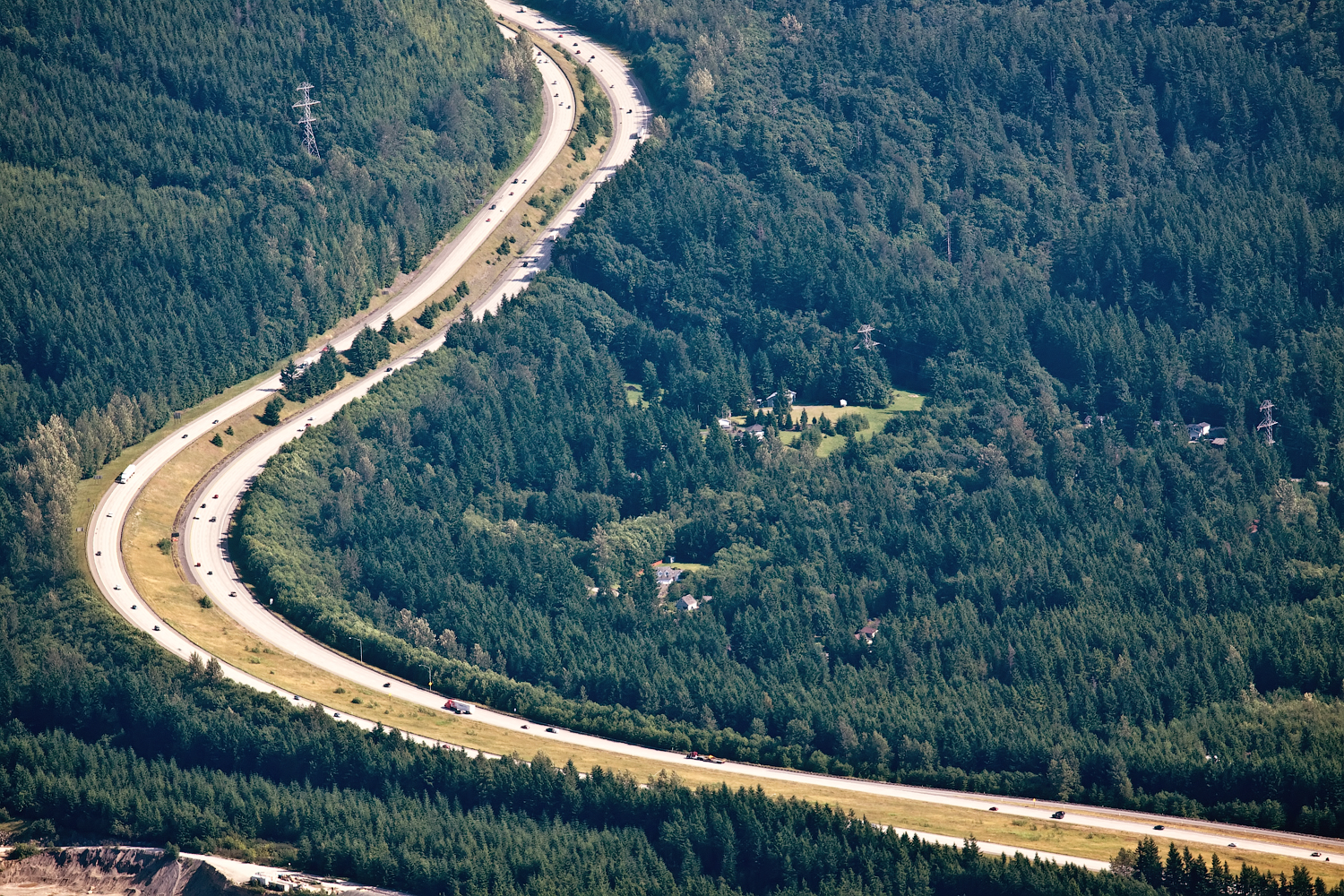
Aerial view of I-90 near North Bend, Washington

The western terminus of I-90 is at an intersection with Washington State Route 519 and 4th Avenue South in the SoDo neighborhood of Seattle. The junction is south of Downtown Seattle, adjacent to the Port of Seattle and two major sports stadiums, Lumen Field and T-Mobile Park. The freeway travels east through an interchange with I-5 and around Beacon Hill before it enters the Mount Baker Ridge Tunnel alongside the 2 Line of the Link light rail system. I-90 emerges from the tunnel on a pair of floating bridges, among the longest of their kind: the eastbound-only Lacey V. Murrow Memorial Bridge and the Homer M. Hadley Memorial Bridge, which carries westbound traffic and the light rail tracks.

The floating bridges cross Lake Washington to Mercer Island, where I-90 travels through a series of tunnels under 14 acres (5.7 ha) of parkland, including Aubrey Davis Park. The freeway continues from the island and enters Bellevue, the largest city of the Eastside region, and intersects I-405 near Factoria. I-90 then travels along Lake Sammamish and through Issaquah as it leaves the Seattle metropolitan area and ascends into the Cascade Range on the Mountains to Sound Greenway, a designated National Heritage Area and National Scenic Byway. The freeway crosses Snoqualmie Pass, elevation 3,022 feet (921 m), at the crest of the mountain range near a ski resort.

From Snoqualmie Pass, I-90 follows the Yakima River into the Kittitas Valley and intersects I-82 in Ellensburg after a brief concurrency with U.S. Route 97 (US 97). The highway crosses the Columbia River on the Vantage Bridge and turns northeast to climb the cliffs of the Columbia Plateau near George. After traveling east across Moses Lake and the surrounding agricultural region, I-90 begins a long concurrency with US 395 at Ritzville as the highways turn northeast towards Spokane. I-90/US 395 is joined by US 2 through western Spokane, where it intersects US 195. The freeway crosses downtown Spokane on an elevated viaduct and splits from US 2 and US 395 to continue east across Spokane Valley towards the Idaho state line.

=== Idaho ===
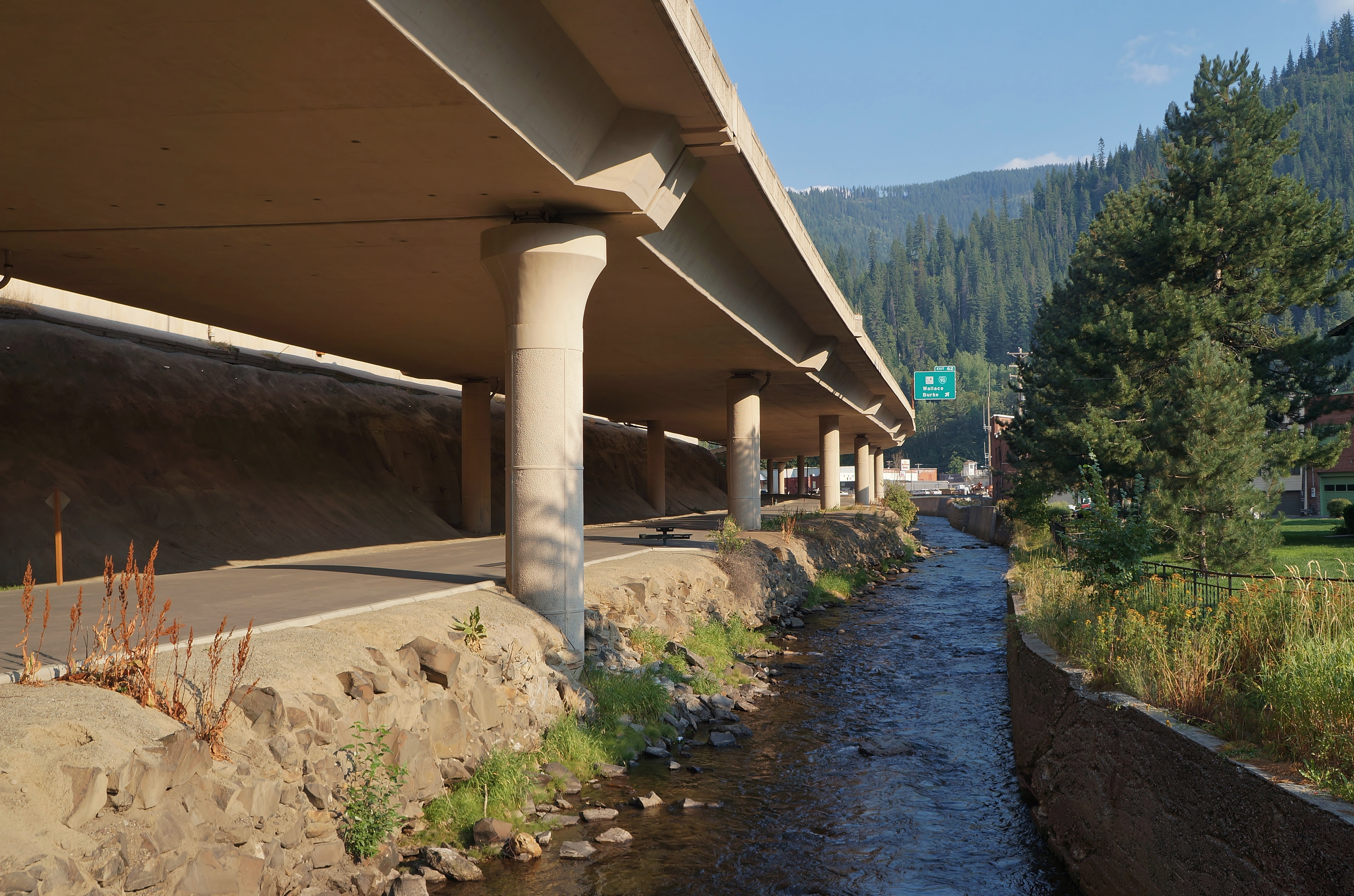
The viaduct bypassing Wallace, Idaho, opened in 1991 as one of the last sections of I-90.

I-90 traverses the Idaho Panhandle region at the north end of the state, where it connects Coeur d'Alene to communities in the Silver Valley. From the Washington state line, the freeway follows the Spokane River through Post Falls and Huetter to the city of Coeur d'Alene, where it intersects US 95, the state's main north–south highway. I-90 then turns southeast to bypass Coeur d'Alene and travel along a series of ridges that face Lake Coeur d'Alene, crossing an arm of the lake on the Veterans Memorial Centennial Bridge.

The freeway continues east across Fourth of July Summit and descends into the Silver Valley, where it follows the Coeur d'Alene River through several small towns along the historic Mullan Road. I-90 serves the cities of Kellogg and Wallace before it ascends into the Bitterroot Range and crosses Lookout Pass, which also marks the Montana state line.

=== Montana ===
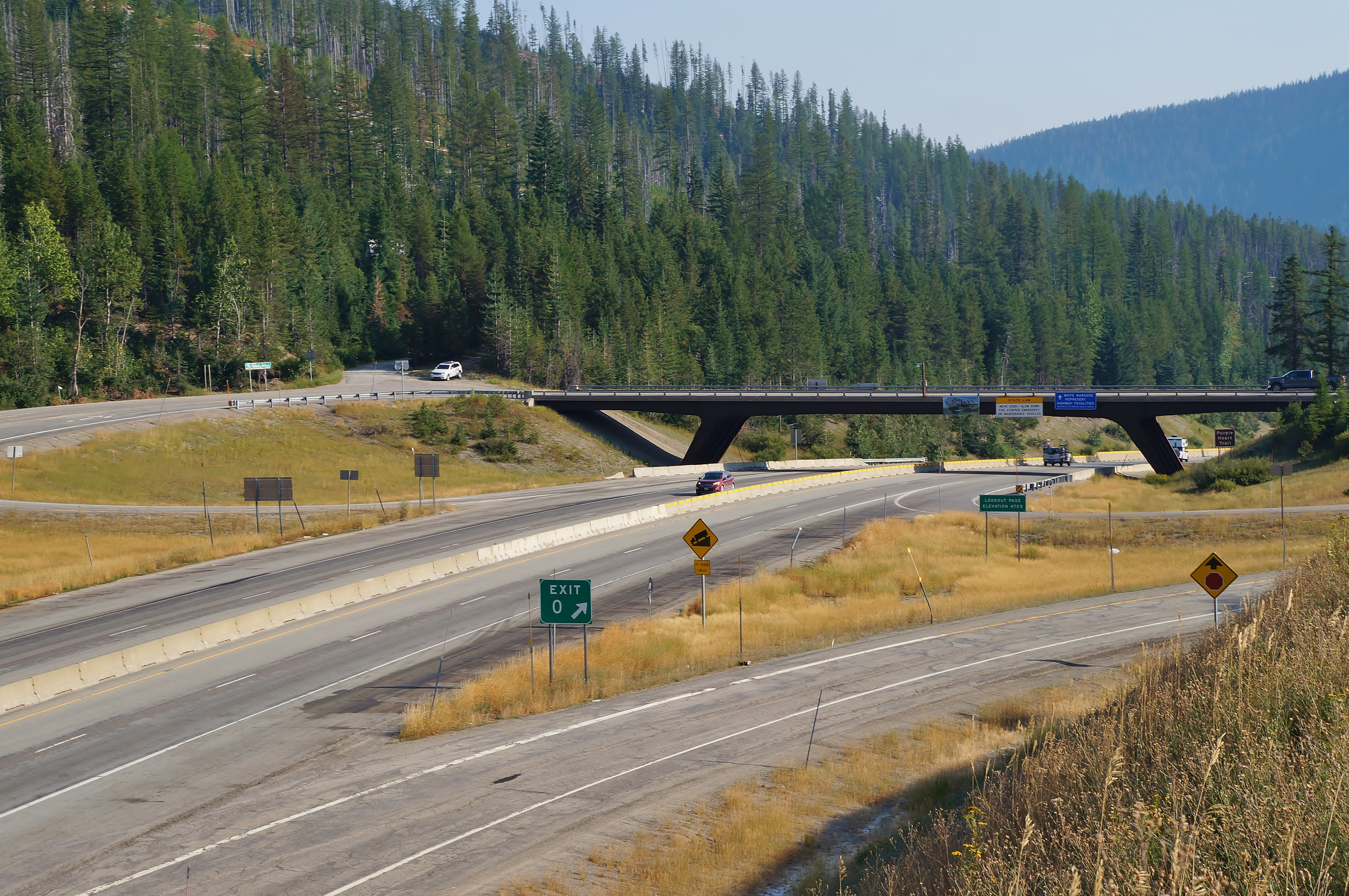
I-90 at Lookout Pass on the Idaho–Montana border

Montana has the longest section of I-90, at almost 552 miles (888 km), despite the highway only serving a portion of the state's east–west width. It descends from Lookout Pass along the St. Regis and Clark Fork rivers between the foothills of the Bitteroot Range and Coeur d'Alene Mountains. The freeway travels east through the Alberton Gorge and crosses the Clark Fork River several times before it reaches the head of the Missoula Valley. After a short concurrency with US 93, I-90 runs along the north side of Missoula and joins US 12 to continue southeast along the foothills of the Garnet Range and Sapphire Mountains.

After it splits from US 12 in Garrison, the freeway turns south to traverse the Deer Lodge Valley. It then turns east to serve Butte, where it overlaps with I-15 for eight miles (13 km) and intersects I-115. I-90 then continues southeast and crosses the Rocky Mountains and Continental Divide at Homestake Pass, which is the highest point on the entire Interstate at 6,329 feet (1,929 m). The freeway travels east across the Jefferson Valley and passes the headwaters of the Missouri River near Three Forks. It then enters the Gallatin Valley.

I-90 travels around Bozeman, where it is joined by US 191, and crosses Bozeman Pass between the Bridger and Gallatin mountains. At the east end of the mountains, the freeway begins to follow the Yellowstone River and is briefly concurrent with US 89, which serves Yellowstone National Park, and splits from US 191 at Big Timber. I-90 continues along the Yellowstone River through Billings, overlapping with US 87 and US 212, until it reaches Lockwood, the western terminus of I-94. The freeways split and I-90 continues east across the Bighorn Basin before it turns south near Hardin to follow the Little Bighorn River into the Crow Indian Reservation. The highway passes the site of the Battle of the Little Bighorn near Crow Agency and continues south along the river and the Wolf Mountains into Wyoming.

From 1995 to 1999, there was no numbered daytime speed limit on rural highways in Montana, including I-90. The speed limit was simply defined as "reasonable and proper" as determined on a case-by-case basis by the Montana Highway Patrol until the Montana Supreme Court ruled it was unconstitutional. The maximum daytime speed limit in Montana was initially set at 75 mph (120 km/h) in 1999 and was later raised to 80 mph (130 km/h) in 2015.

=== Wyoming ===
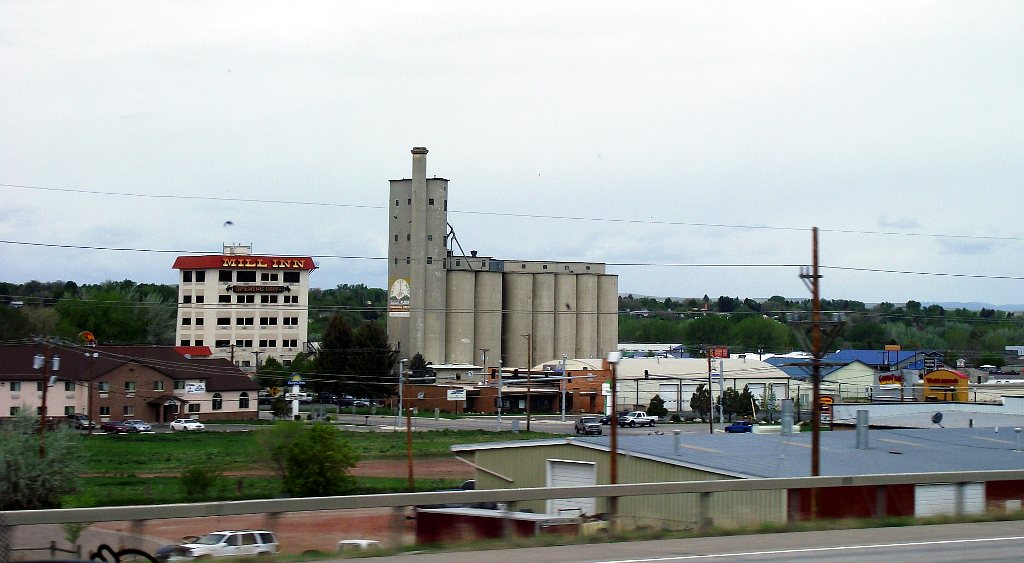
View of southern Sheridan, Wyoming, from I-90

I-90 serves a portion of northeastern Wyoming that is primarily rural. The freeway, briefly concurrent to US 14, travels southeast along a series of creeks to Sheridan in the northeastern foothills of the Bighorn Mountains. I-90 and US 87 split in Sheridan and travel parallel to each other to Fort Phil Kearny, where they rejoin and continue south past Lake Desmet to Buffalo. The highways split again near Buffalo at a junction with I-25, which overlaps with US 87 to Casper.

From Buffalo, the highway turns east to cross the Powder River Basin, a region with several large coal mines. I-90 then reaches Gillette, where it begins a concurrency with US 14 and US 16 to a three-way split in Moorcroft. The freeway continues into the Bear Lodge Mountains (part of the Black Hills) and is rejoined in Sundance by US 14, which looped north to serve the Devils Tower. I-90/US 14 then continues northeast to Beulah, where it enters South Dakota.

=== South Dakota ===
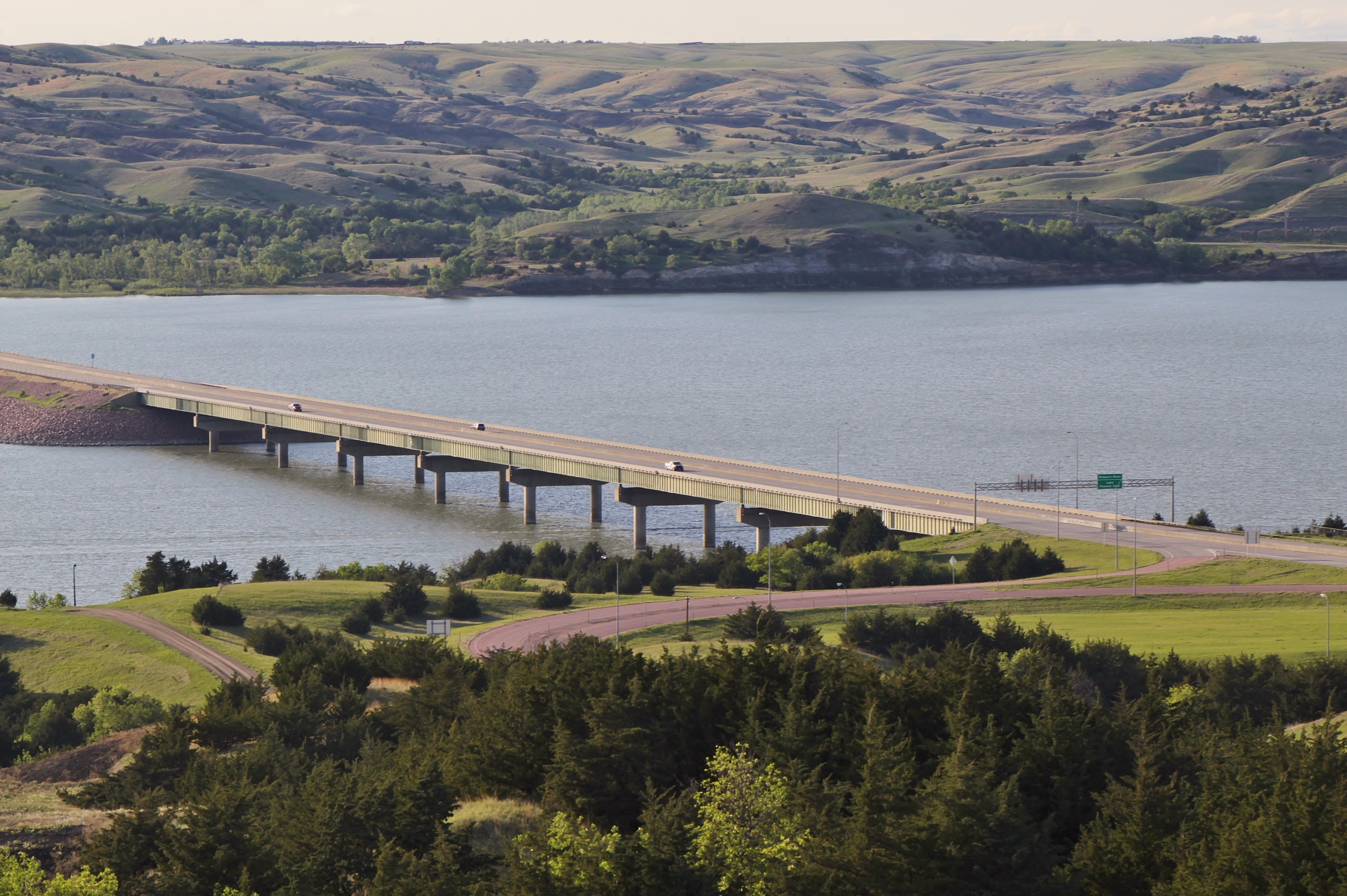
The Lewis and Clark Memorial Bridge, which carries I-90 over the Missouri River near Chamberlain, South Dakota

I-90/US 14 enters South Dakota near Spearfish and travels east through prairie land, where it is briefly concurrent with US 85. Beyond Sturgis, the freeway turns south and follows the edge of the Black Hills to Rapid City, the gateway to Mount Rushmore. It then skirts the northern edge of Rapid City, which is served by spur route I-190, and passes Ellsworth Air Force Base while it continues east across the plains. I-90 splits from US 14 near Wall, home to the Wall Drug roadside attraction and located northeast of Badlands National Park.

The freeway travels southeast into the Buffalo Gap National Grassland and also passes a pair of decommissioned missile silos that form the Minuteman Missile National Historic Site. I-90 continues east along the top of a plateau that faces the White River and passes near Kadoka and Murdo. US 83 briefly joins the highway from Murdo to Vivian, where it splits off to serve the state capital of Pierre. It then crosses the Missouri River on the Lewis and Clark Memorial Bridge near Chamberlain and passes a rest area which overlooks the river and includes the 50-foot (15 m) Dignity statue. From Chamberlain, I-90 continues east across the plains and past several small towns near the city of Mitchell. It then reaches the Sioux Falls area, where it bypasses the city to the north and intersects I-29 and I-229. I-90 leaves Sioux Falls and crosses into Minnesota near Brandon.

=== Minnesota ===
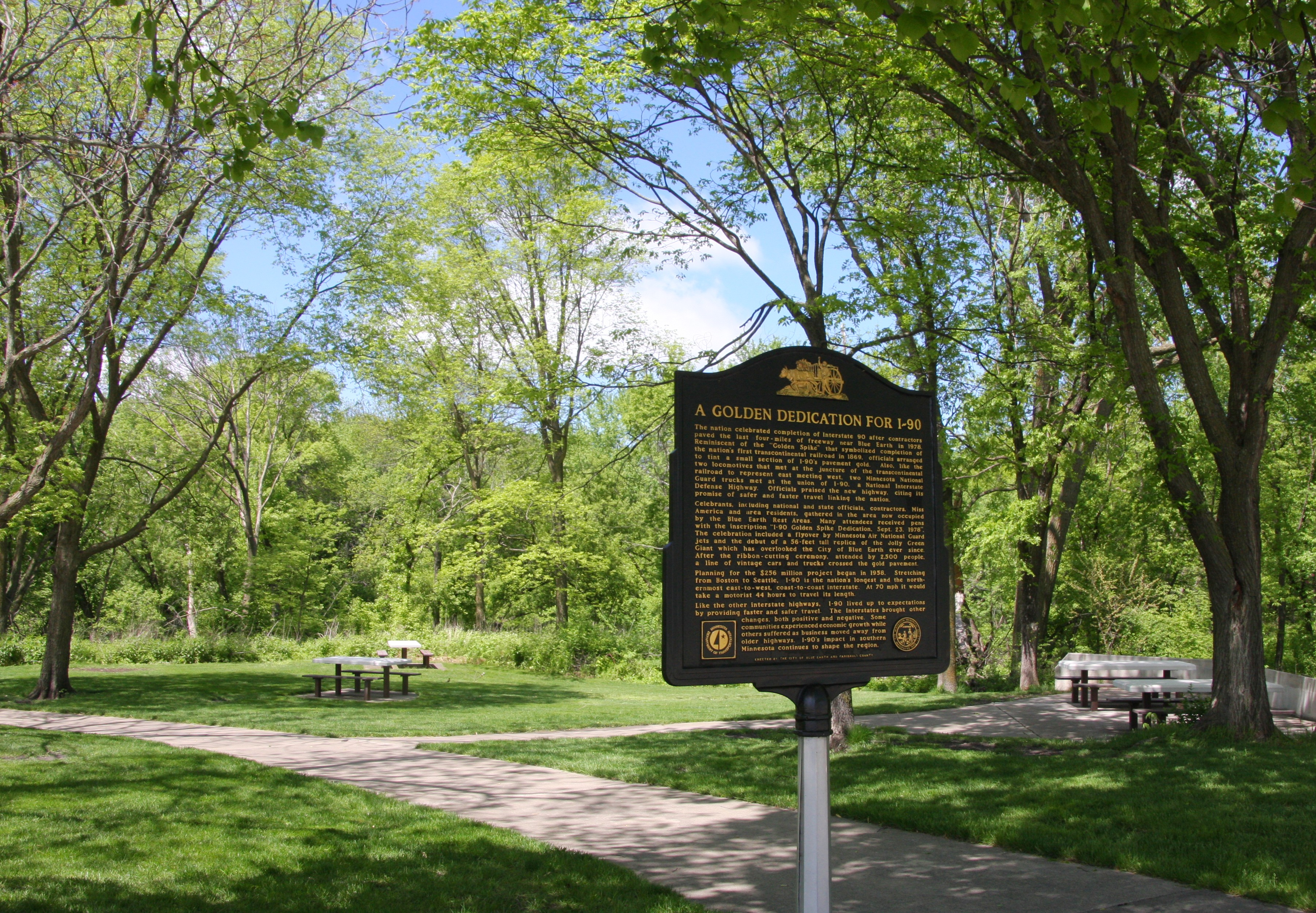
Historic marker to commemorate the completion of I-90 in 1978 near Blue Earth, Minnesota

I-90 crosses the southern portion of Minnesota and carries unsigned Legislative Route 391 across the state. From the South Dakota border near Beaver Creek to Albert Lea, the freeway travels east across farmland and towns in the plains and rolling hills of the Buffalo Ridge. It also intersects several north–south highways, including US 75 in Luverne, US 59 in Worthington, US 71 in Jackson, and US 169 in Blue Earth. I-90 travels around the northern outskirts of Albert Lea and intersects I-35 northeast of the city. It then reaches Austin and a brief concurrency with US 218.

From Austin, the freeway turns northeast to head towards Rochester, which it bypasses to the south and intersects US 63 and US 52. I-90 continues east into the hilly Driftless Area and descends from the bluffs that overlook Lake Onalaska on the Mississippi River. It turns southeast at Dakota and is joined by US 14 until the highways split near La Crescent. I-90 turns east before it reaches La Crescent, where it crosses the Mississippi River on the Dresbach Bridge into Wisconsin.

=== Wisconsin ===
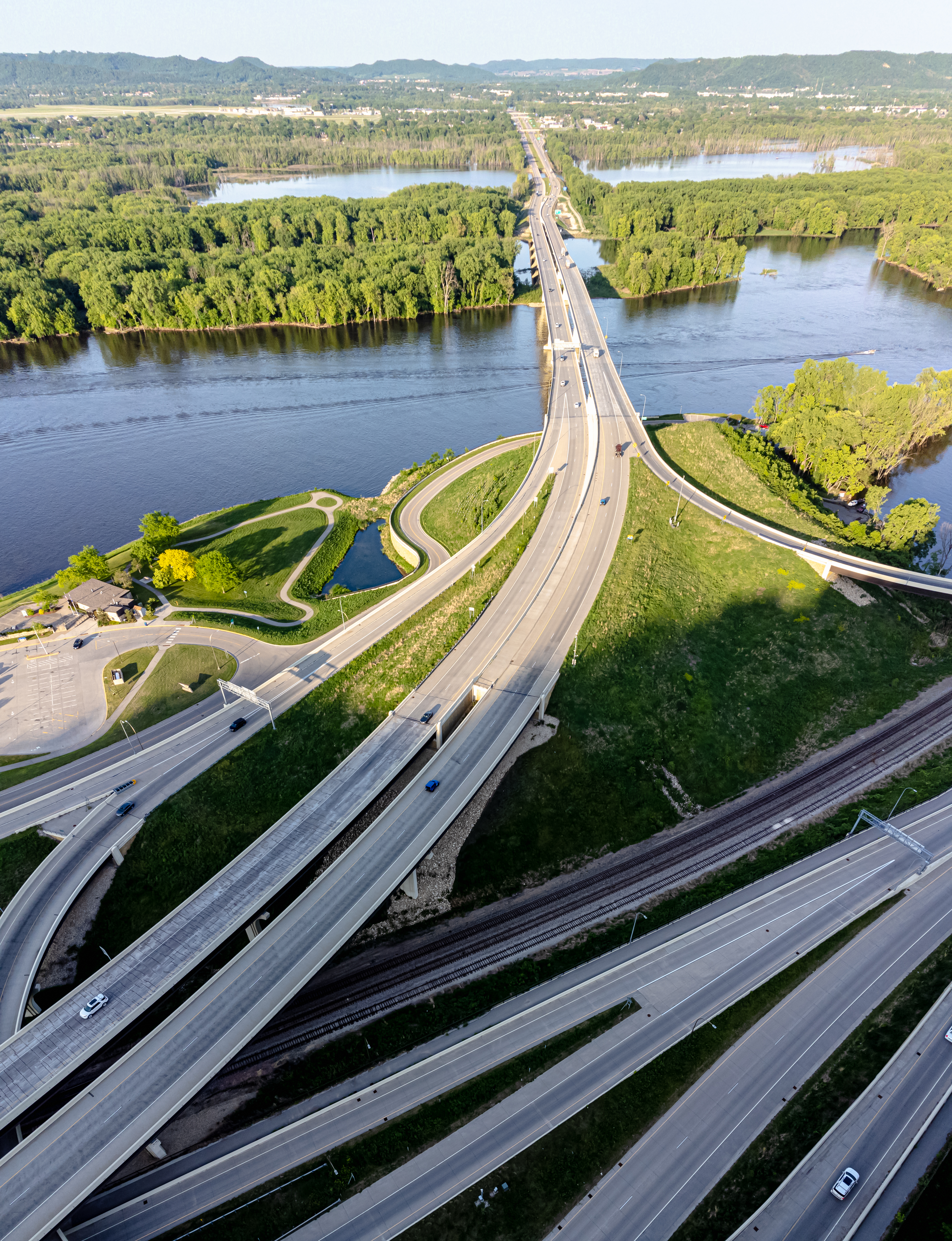
I-90 Mississippi River bridge near La Crosse

I-90 enters Wisconsin near La Crosse and bisects French Island before it reaches Onalaska. This section is briefly concurrent to US 53 between La Crosse and Onalaska. The freeway travels east, generally along the La Crosse River, through several towns and Fort McCoy before it reaches a junction with I-94 in Tomah. The two Interstates join at Tomah and travel southeast along the edge of the hills of the Western Upland, following the Lemonweir and Wisconsin rivers. It passes Wisconsin Dells, situated on the gorge of the same name and home to several water parks and theme parks.

The freeway travels east from Wisconsin Dells to the Portage area, where I-39 begins its concurrency with I-90/I-94. The highway then crosses the Wisconsin River and travels south towards Madison, where it forms an eastern bypass of the city. East of Madison, I-94 separates from I-39/I-90, which continues southeast through Edgerton and Janesville. The highway turns south and enters Beloit, where it intersects I-43 and crosses into Illinois.

=== Illinois ===
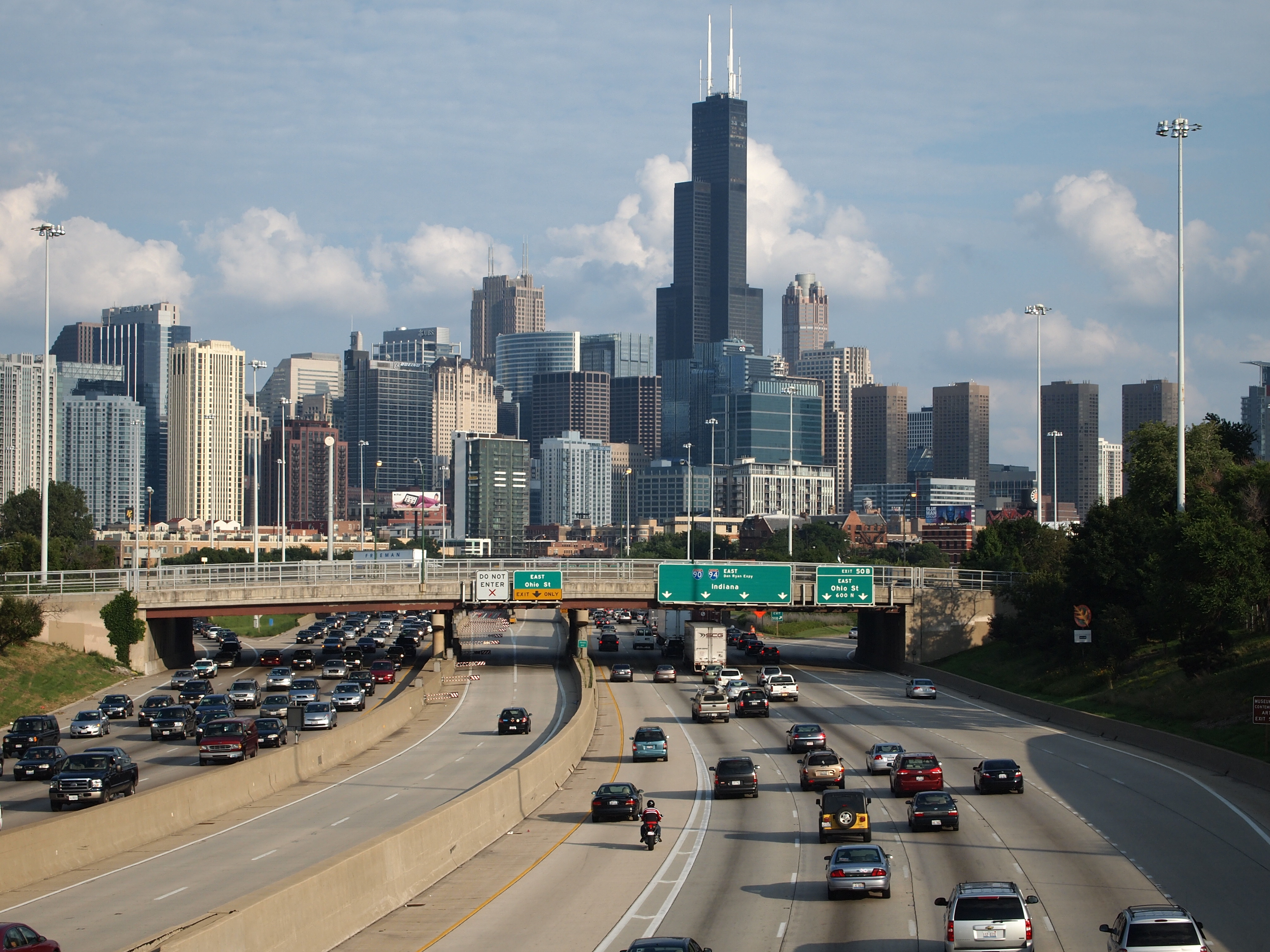
The Kennedy Expressway, looking southeast toward the Chicago skyline

I-90 uses several sections of the Illinois Tollway system as it traverses the northeastern corner of the state, primarily in the Chicago metropolitan area. It enters the state from Beloit, Wisconsin, and remains concurrent to I-39 and US 51 on the Jane Addams Memorial Tollway through the eastern outskirts of Rockford, where the highways split off. I-90 continues on the tollway as it follows US 20 southeast through Belvidere and Elgin in the Fox Valley.

The tollway cuts through the northwestern suburbs of Chicago, where it intersects I-290 in Schaumburg and passes the north side of O'Hare International Airport. On the east side of the airport in Rosemont, I-90 intersects I-294 and I-190, the latter of which serves the airport's passenger terminals and marks the end of the tollway. The freeway, now named the Kennedy Expressway, travels through northwestern Chicago, where the Blue Line of the "L" rapid transit system runs in the median and serves several stops. I-90 turns southeast and is rejoined by I-94 in Irving Park, where it gains a set of reversible express lanes that travel for 6.2 miles (10.0 km) toward the Near West Side.

The Kennedy Expressway travels south through the Near West Side, opposite the Chicago River from the Chicago Loop (the city's central business district), and intersects I-290 again at the Jane Byrne Interchange. The freeway continues onto the Dan Ryan Expressway and crosses the Chicago River near Chinatown and an interchange with I-55. The Dan Ryan is the widest section of I-90, at 12 through lanes, and is split between local and express lanes. I-90/I-94 is joined by the "L" Red Line in the median of the expressway through the city's South Side, where it passes Rate Field, the Illinois Institute of Technology campus, and Washington Park. I-90 splits from the Dan Ryan Expressway in Englewood and turns southeast onto the tolled Chicago Skyway. The tolled Skyway travels towards the Indiana state line, which the freeway crosses near the Calumet River in the East Side.

=== Indiana ===
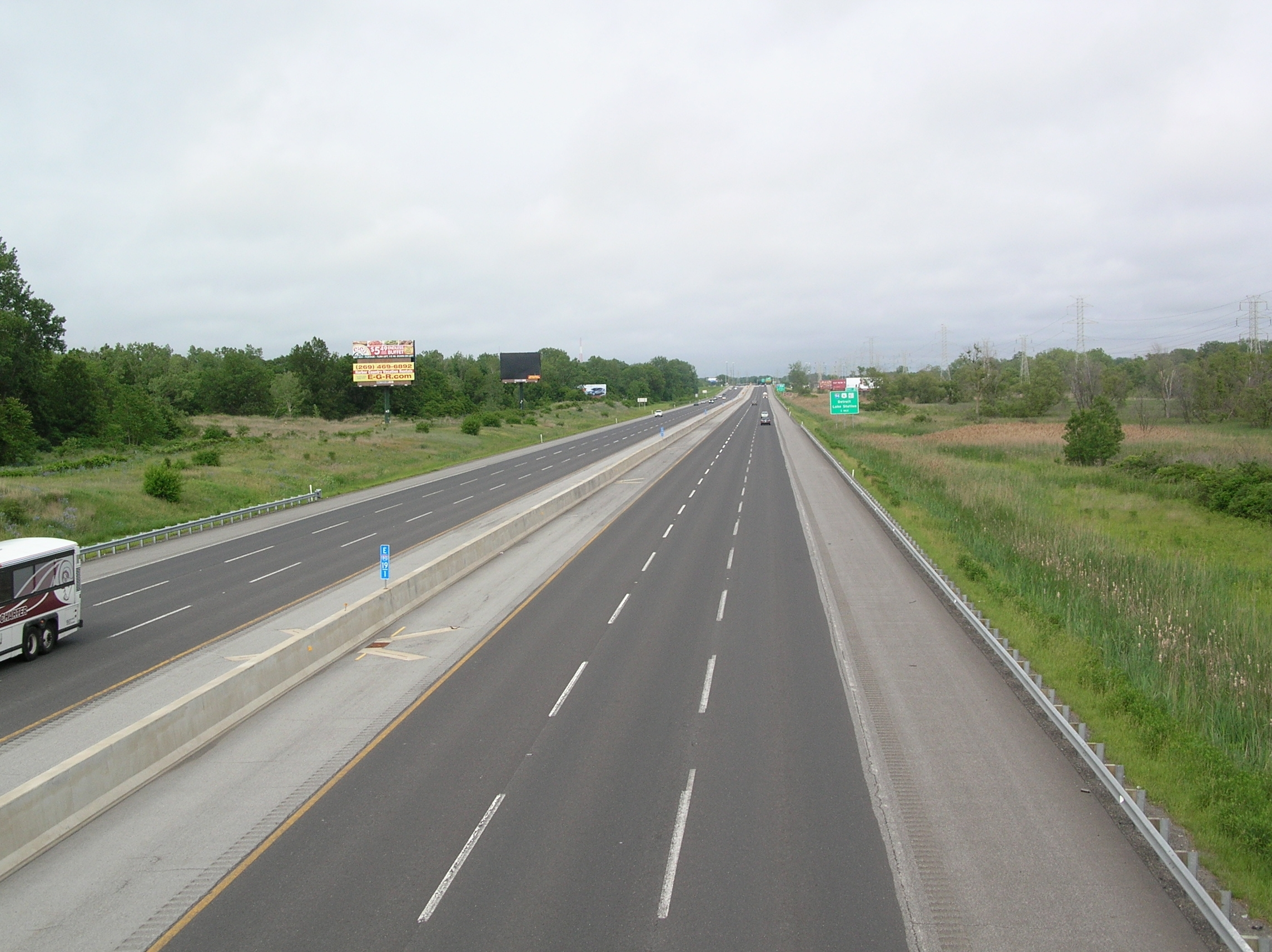
A section of the Indiana Toll Road (carrying I-90) in Gary, Indiana

The entirety of I-90 within Indiana is concurrent with the Indiana Toll Road, which crosses the state's northern fringe and is mostly shared with I-80. From the Illinois state line, the tollway travels south through Hammond and turns east to follow the Grand Calumet River through northern Gary, where it intersects US 41 and US 12. I-90 then crosses I-65 in eastern Gary and I-94 in Lake Station, where it begins a concurrency with I-80.

I-94 travels northeast near the Lake Michigan shoreline from Lake Station to Michigan City, while the Indiana Toll Road (I-80/I-90) follows it to the south. The tollway then moves closer to the Michigan–Indiana state line and turns east, passing through the northern outskirts of South Bend and Elkhart. In South Bend, it intersects US 31 and passes near the University of Notre Dame. I-80/I-90 travels parallel to the state line until it reaches an interchange with I-69 near Fremont, where it turns southeast. The tollway then turns east and crosses the Ohio state line near Angola.

=== Ohio ===
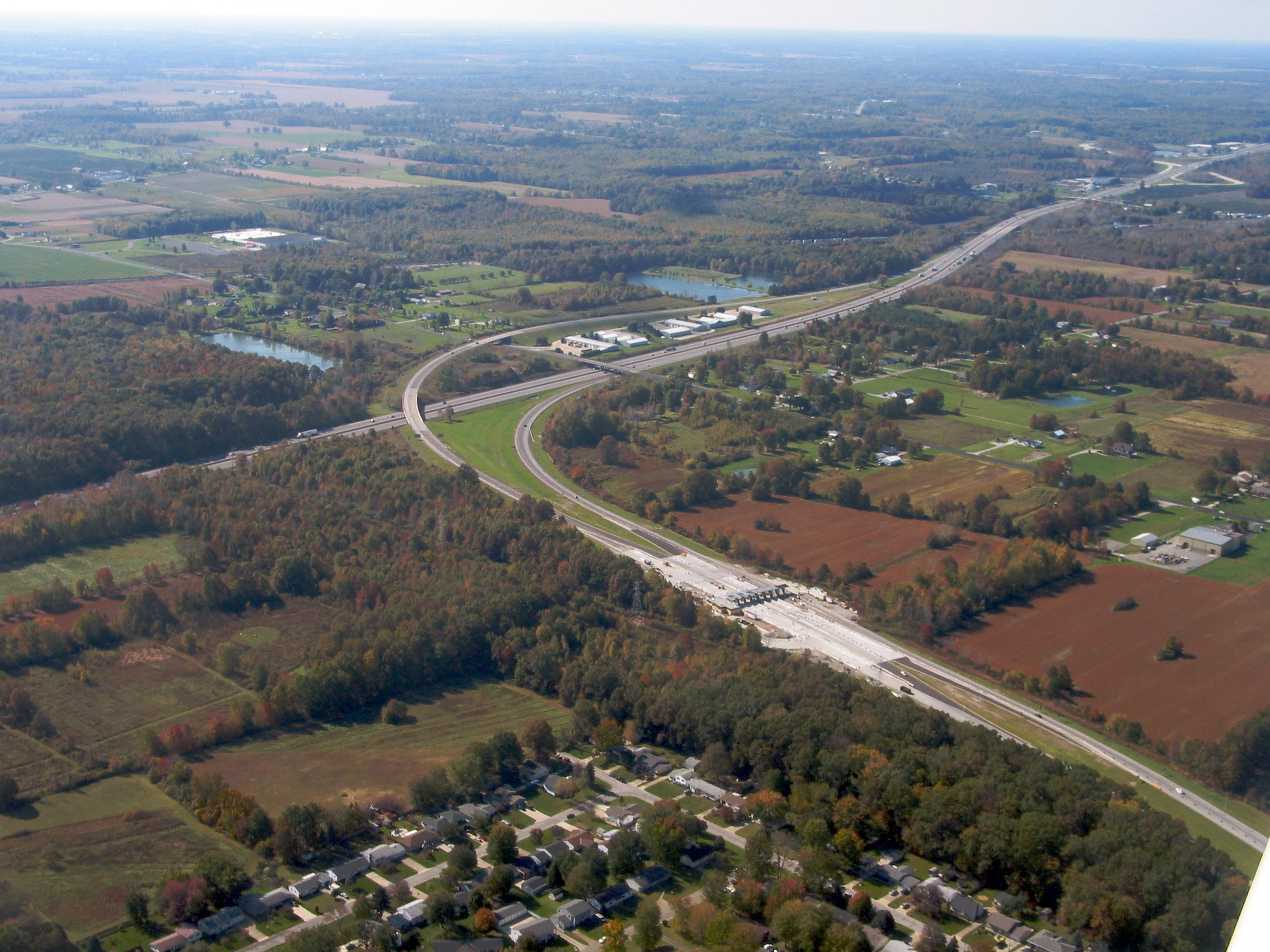
Aerial view of Ohio Turnpike exit 142, showing the connector between I-90 and I-80 on the turnpike

At the state line near Montpelier, I-80/I-90 transitions from the Indiana Toll Road to the Ohio Turnpike, which crosses northern Ohio. The highway continues east around several rural towns as it approaches the Toledo area. The turnpike crosses under I-475 in Maumee without an interchange; access to I-475 is instead provided through a nearby junction with US 20. I-80/I-90 then continues southeast across the Maumee River to Rossford on the southern outskirts of Toledo, where it intersects I-75.

The turnpike travels southeast through a rural area near the southwest shore of Lake Erie, where it passes the cities of Fremont and Sandusky. Near Norwalk, the highway turns northeast to follow State Route 2 (SR 2) and heads to Elyria, where I-90 splits from I-80 (which remains on the turnpike). The freeway then merges with SR 2 and continues northeast through the lakeshore suburbs west of Cleveland, including Rocky River and Lakewood. I-90 and SR 2 separate after crossing the Rocky River and travel parallel to each other as they enter Cleveland. I-90 continues through the southwestern residential neighborhoods of Cleveland and reaches a junction with I-71 and I-490 in Tremont, where it turns north.

From Tremont, I-90 turns north onto the Innerbelt Freeway and crosses the Cuyahoga River into Downtown Cleveland on the George V. Voinovich Bridges. The Innerbelt skirts the south side of Downtown Cleveland, where it intersects I-77 near Progressive Field and turns north to bisect the Goodrich–Kirtland Park neighborhood. Near Cleveland Burke Lakefront Airport, the freeway makes a sharp, 90-degree turn (nicknamed "Dead Man's Curve" for its frequent crashes) and rejoins SR 2 on the Cleveland Memorial Shoreway until they split again in Euclid. I-90 briefly turns southeast but resumes its northeastern route after a junction with I-271 in Willoughby Hills. The freeway travels parallel to the Lake Erie shoreline through farmland and exurban towns and crosses into Pennsylvania near Conneaut.

=== Pennsylvania ===
Within Pennsylvania, I-90 is non-tolled and generally travels northeast around several communities on the Lake Erie shoreline and remains entirely in Erie County. It enters the state in Springfield Township and passes through rural areas along the lake shore, parallel to US 20 and the Lake Road. The freeway then travels through the southern outskirts of Erie, where it intersects I-79 and US 19. I-90 returns to the rural areas of northeastern Erie County and intersects I-86 before it reaches the New York state line near the borough of North East. At 46 miles (74 km), the Pennsylvania section is I-90's shortest within a single state.

=== New York ===
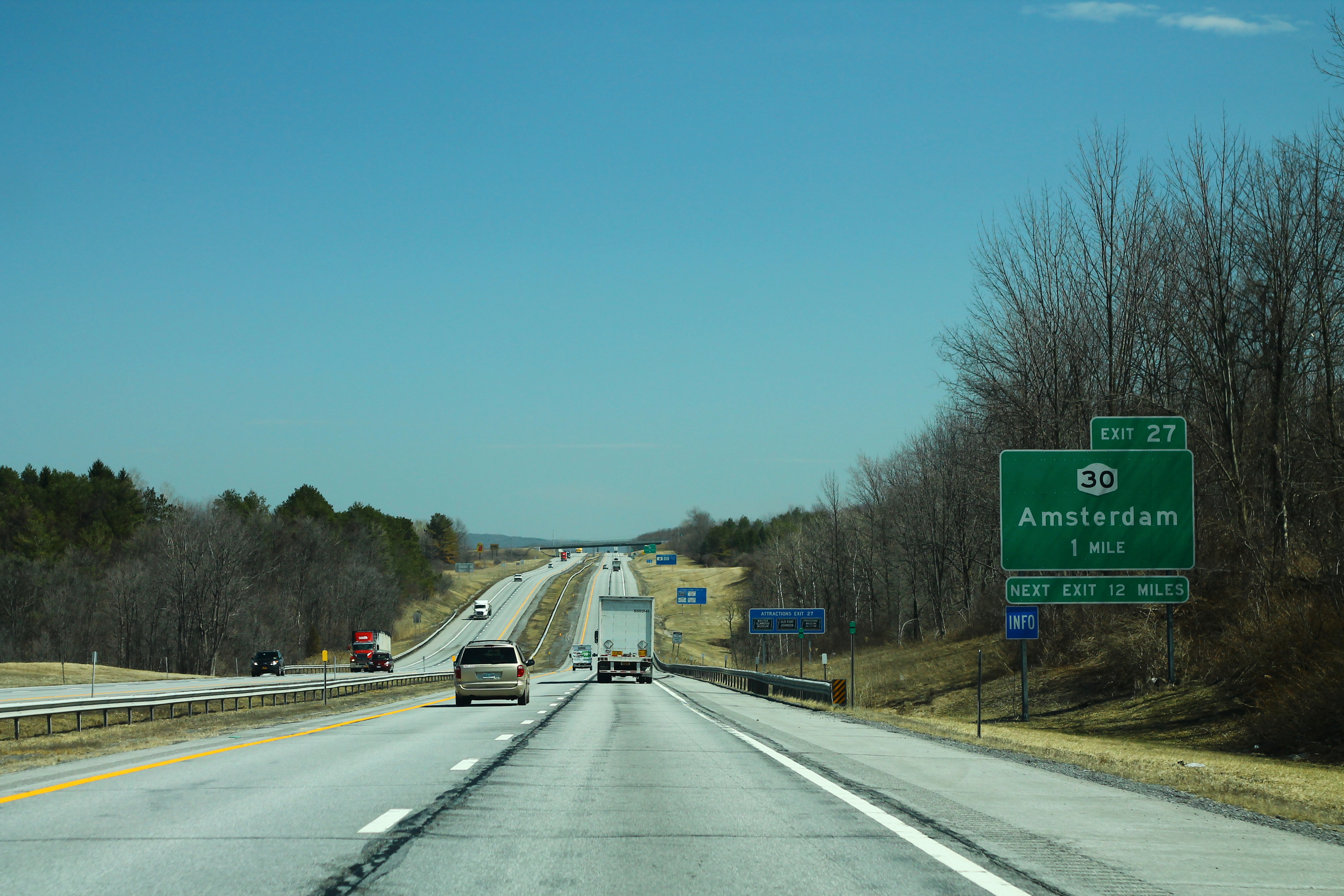
The New York State Thruway near Amsterdam

I-90 enters New York in Chautauqua County and runs concurrently with the mainline of the tolled New York State Thruway. It travels northeast along the Lake Erie shoreline between Lake Road to the north and US 20 to the south through Dunkirk and Fredonia. The highways enter the Buffalo area, where the toll road runs north–south through Cheektowaga and forms an eastern bypass, using auxiliary routes I-190 and I-290 to serve the city. At a junction with I-290 near Buffalo Niagara International Airport, I-90 turns east to follow the historic Water Level Route of the New York Central Railroad, itself parallel to the 19th-century Erie Canal.

The Thruway passes south of Rochester, which it serves via a loop on I-490 and the direct north–south spur I-390. I-90 travels through the Finger Lakes region and moves closer to the Erie Canal as it approaches the Syracuse area. It travels through the city's northern outskirts, where it intersects I-690, I-81, and I-481 from west to east. It then continues to Utica, where the Thruway runs along the north side of the Mohawk River (part of the Erie Canal). The section through Utica, connected to the city's downtown via I-790, was built between the lines of SR 49, which does not merge with the Thruway.

I-90 then closely follows the Mohawk River southeast through several towns and villages between the foothills of the Catskill and Adirondack mountains. The Thruway then reaches Schenectady, which it bypasses to the southwest and intersects I-88 and I-890, the latter of which serves the city's downtown. The highway continues southeast into Albany to a junction with I-87, where I-90 splits from the Thruway, which turns south to serve New York City. I-90 travels east as a toll-free freeway through the northern neighborhoods of Albany and intersects I-787 before it crosses the Hudson River. The freeway travels south around Rensselaer and rejoins the Thruway via the Berkshire Connector, which continues east into the Taconic Mountains toward the Massachusetts state line.

The mileposts and sequential exit numbers on the New York State Thruway mainline originate from New York City, increasing northward on I-87 and westward on I-90; as a result, the mileposts and exit numbers on I-90 through most of New York run backwards compared to the federal preference for mile-based numbers increasing from west to east. The Berkshire Connector uses west-to-east mileposts and exit numbers with a "B" prefix; the toll-free section of I-90 through Albany and Rensselaer uses conventional west-to-east mileposts and exit numbers despite being geographically north–south. I-90 is currently the only Interstate that has a complete set of nine spur routes within one state, all numbers being used. In addition, I-990, a short spur route near Buffalo that is not directly connected to I-90, is the highest number given to an Interstate.

=== Massachusetts ===
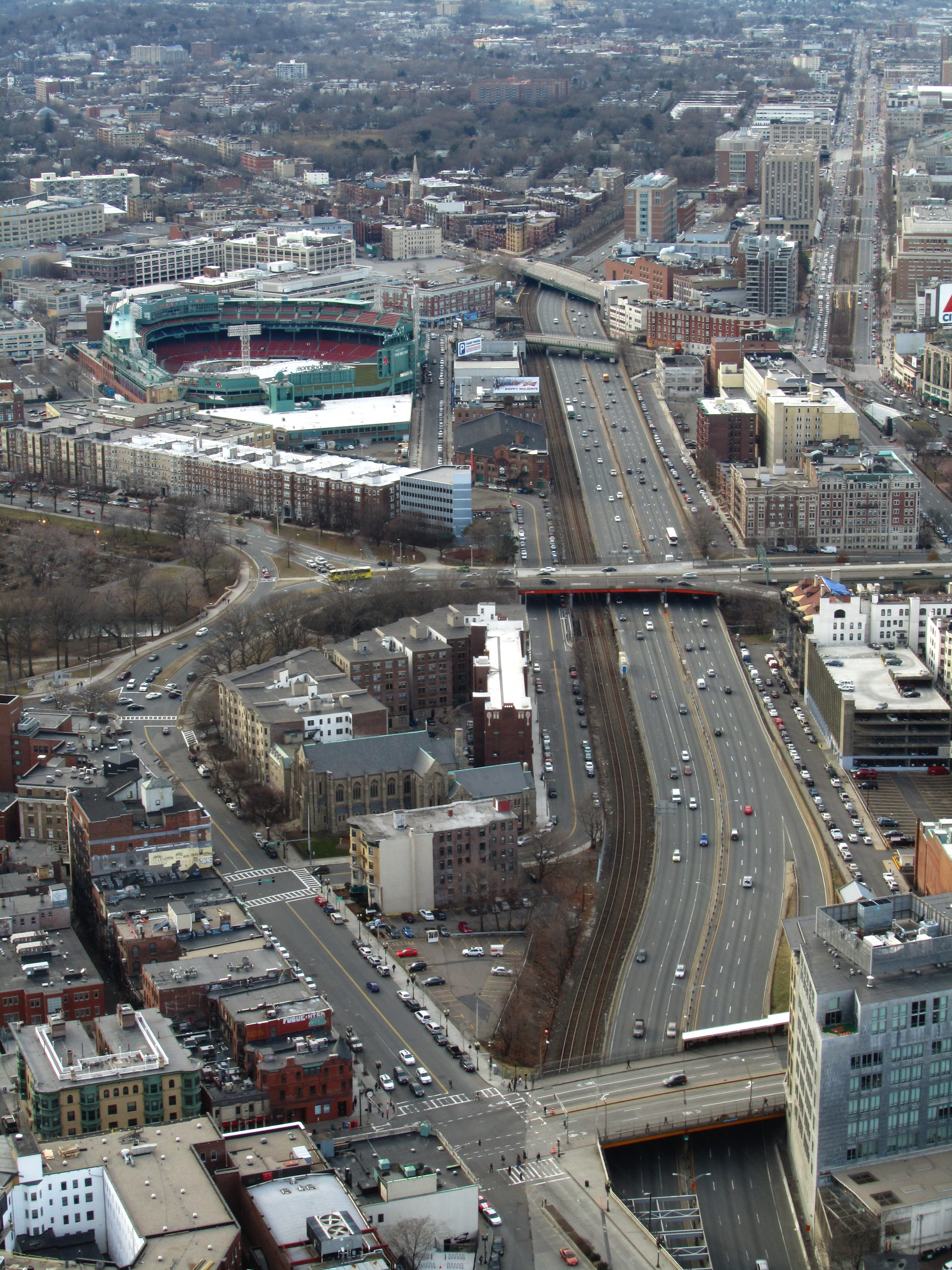
View of the Massachusetts Turnpike in Boston's Fenway–Kenmore neighborhood, seen from the Prudential Tower. Fenway Park is visible at top left.

I-90 in Massachusetts is concurrent with the entirety of the Massachusetts Turnpike (also known as "the Pike" or "MassPike"). The turnpike begins at the New York state line in West Stockbridge and travels southeast through the Berkshires to the Pioneer Valley. The highway travels through the northern suburbs of Springfield, where it intersects I-91 and crosses the Connecticut River into Chicopee. I-90 then crosses over I-391 without an interchange and serves as the northern terminus of I-291 on the eastern outskirts of the city. The turnpike continues east through the hills of Central Massachusetts and serves as the eastern terminus of I-84 in the town of Sturbridge.

From Sturbridge, the turnpike travels northeast towards Worcester and passes through the city's southern outskirts. It serves as the respective northern and western terminus of I-395 and I-290 in Auburn, located southwest of Worcester, and continues to an interchange with I-495 near Westborough at the edge of Greater Boston. I-90 travels through the western suburbs of Boston and travels through Framingham before it intersects I-95/Route 128, the main beltway around Boston, on the border of Weston and Newton. The turnpike continues along the Charles River into Boston, where it descends into a tunnel that passes Boston University, Fenway Park, and under the Prudential Tower complex in the Back Bay neighborhood.

I-90 intersects I-93 on the south side of Downtown Boston and travels under the Fort Point Channel to serve the Seaport District. The turnpike then enters the Ted Williams Tunnel, which travels northeast under Boston Harbor to the passenger terminals at Logan International Airport. After it passes the northwest side of the airport, I-90 terminates at an interchange with Route 1A in East Boston. The section between I-93 and the airport was opened in the early 2000s as part of the Big Dig megaproject, which rebuilt several Boston freeways and extended I-90 by 3.5 miles (5.6 km).

== History ==
=== Predecessors and establishment ===
An east–west controlled access highway to serve the Northern United States was proposed in the early 20th century in several federal government documents, including reports from the Bureau of Public Roads in the 1930s and 1940s. The Interstate Highway System was created by the Federal-Aid Highway Act of 1956, which was approved by the U.S. Congress and signed into law on June 26, 1956. I-90 was assigned to the northernmost transcontinental route in the system by the American Association of State Highway Officials in 1957.

The freeway would travel along existing parts of the United States Numbered Highway System, which was established at the suggestion of the federal government in 1926 to replace the named auto trails. Among these auto trails, which were generally designated by private motorist organizations, were the transcontinental Yellowstone Trail and National Parks Highway, created in the 1910s along the future route of I-90 between Seattle and Boston. The national numbered highways along the corridor included US 10 from Seattle to Billings, Montana; US 87 from Billings to Buffalo, Wyoming; US 16 from Buffalo to Portage, Wisconsin; US 51 from Portage to Rockford, Illinois and US 20 from Rockford to Boston.

=== Tollways and urban construction ===
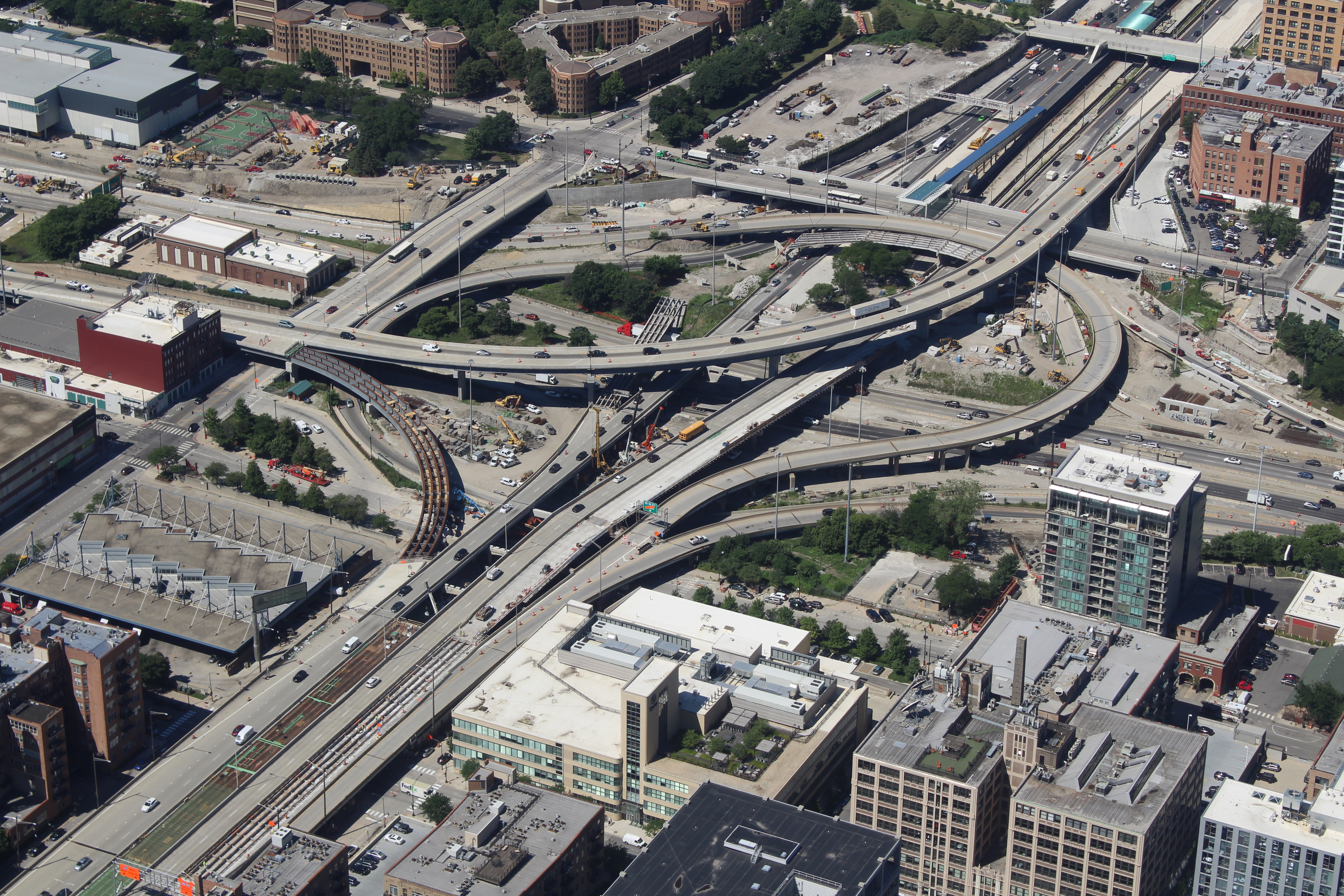
Aerial view of the Circle Interchange in Chicago during reconstruction in 2018

Major portions of I-90 in the Midwest and Northeastern states used existing toll roads built by state governments in the 1950s and 1960s. The Northwest Tollway, Chicago Skyway, Indiana Toll Road, Ohio Turnpike, New York State Thruway, and Massachusetts Turnpike all predate I-90 and were incorporated into the route. This also meant that portions of the route did not adhere to Interstate Highway standards, but they were either deemed adequate or rebuilt to conform by the 1980s. The Pennsylvania section was planned in the early 1950s as the "Erie Extension" of the Pennsylvania Turnpike, but was instead completed as a toll-free road in October 1960 with federal funds. The completion of the section also allowed for full use of the New York State Thruway, which had been finished three years earlier but ended abruptly at the state line.

I-90 would use several expressways and tollways in the Chicago area, the earliest of which was the Tri-State Expressway (now the Kingery Expressway), completed in 1950 and extended into Indiana the following year. It was followed by the Congress Expressway in the western suburbs, first opened in 1955, and the Northwest Tollway in 1958. The last section to be completed in Illinois was the toll-free Dan Ryan Expressway, which opened on December 15, 1962, and was described as the "world's widest freeway" at the time. In 1965, the designation for I-90 was switched with I-94 south of Chicago, which moved it to the tolled Chicago Skyway (completed in 1958); the change was requested by the Illinois and Indiana state governments to avoid confusion and provide a continuous toll connection to the Indiana Toll Road, which had been fully opened in 1956. I-90 was moved onto the Kennedy Expressway in 1977 and its western route was replaced with I-290 from Schaumburg to the Circle Interchange in Chicago.

The other tolled sections of I-90 were completed in the 1950s by their respective state governments. The 241-mile (388 km) Ohio Turnpike opened to traffic on October 1, 1955, three years after construction began. The first segment of the New York Thruway opened in June 1954 and was followed by extensions to Buffalo and the Albany area by the end of the year. It was extended to the Pennsylvania state line in 1957 and to the Massachusetts Turnpike via the Berkshire Connector in 1959. The Berkshire section linked with the Massachusetts Turnpike, which had opened in 1957 from the state line to Newton, a distance of 123 miles (198 km). The turnpike was extended into Boston in two stages: first by 9 miles (14 km) from Newton to Allston in September 1964; and finally with an extension to I-93 near South Station in Downtown Boston that opened on February 18, 1965.

=== Non-tolled construction ===
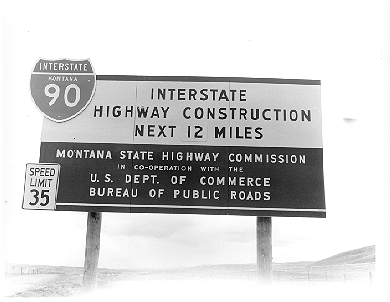
Construction sign on a section of I-90 in Montana

The freeway also incorporated other non-tolled expressway bypasses planned by state governments in the early 1950s and modified to meet Interstate standards. A bypass of Spokane Valley, Washington, opened in November 1956 as the first section in Washington and was extended into neighboring Spokane two years later. Wisconsin opened their first section in November 1959, connecting the terminus of the Illinois Tollway with Janesville, and extended the freeway through the Madison area to Wisconsin Dells in 1962. The Cleveland Innerbelt opened in stages from 1959 to 1962 and was originally planned to connect with the Parma Freeway, which would have carried I-90 around the northwest side of Downtown Cleveland. It was later cancelled in the 1960s amid public opposition. The first Minnesota section, built to bypass Austin, began construction in 1957 and opened in 1961.

Wisconsin was among the first states to complete its rural Interstate system and opened its final section of I-90, from La Crosse to Tomah, in November 1969. The section around Albany, New York, built as a toll-free alternative to the New York Thruway, was completed in 1976 with a connection to the Berkshire Connector, which had been originally intended to carry the I-90 designation across the Hudson River. South Dakota completed its final section in November 1976, which created an unbroken stretch of four-lane highway from the Wyoming state line to Boston but some intersections remained. The Minnesota segment of I-90 was declared complete in September 1978 with a dedication at Blue Earth, where a golden line was painted to emulate the golden spike of the first transcontinental railroad. Two months later, Ohio finished its last section west of Cleveland.

The western states were the last to complete their segments of I-90. Wyoming opened its final section, from the Montana state line to Sheridan, in July 1985 and dedicated it three months later following the completion of Montana's cross-border section. The last two-lane section in Montana, near Springdale, was widened to four lanes in May 1987. One of the last rural sections of I-90 to be built was through Wallace, Idaho, which placed its downtown on the National Register of Historic Places in 1976 to prevent its demolition for the freeway. The 1.5-mile (2.4 km) elevated freeway bypassed Wallace to the north and cost $42 million (equivalent to $86 million in 2024 dollars) to construct. It opened on September 5, 1991, and the city ceremonially retired the last stoplight on I-90 a week later. The Idaho section was declared fully complete in July 1992 after the Veterans Memorial Centennial Bridge opened near Coeur d'Alene.

=== Completion and later projects ===
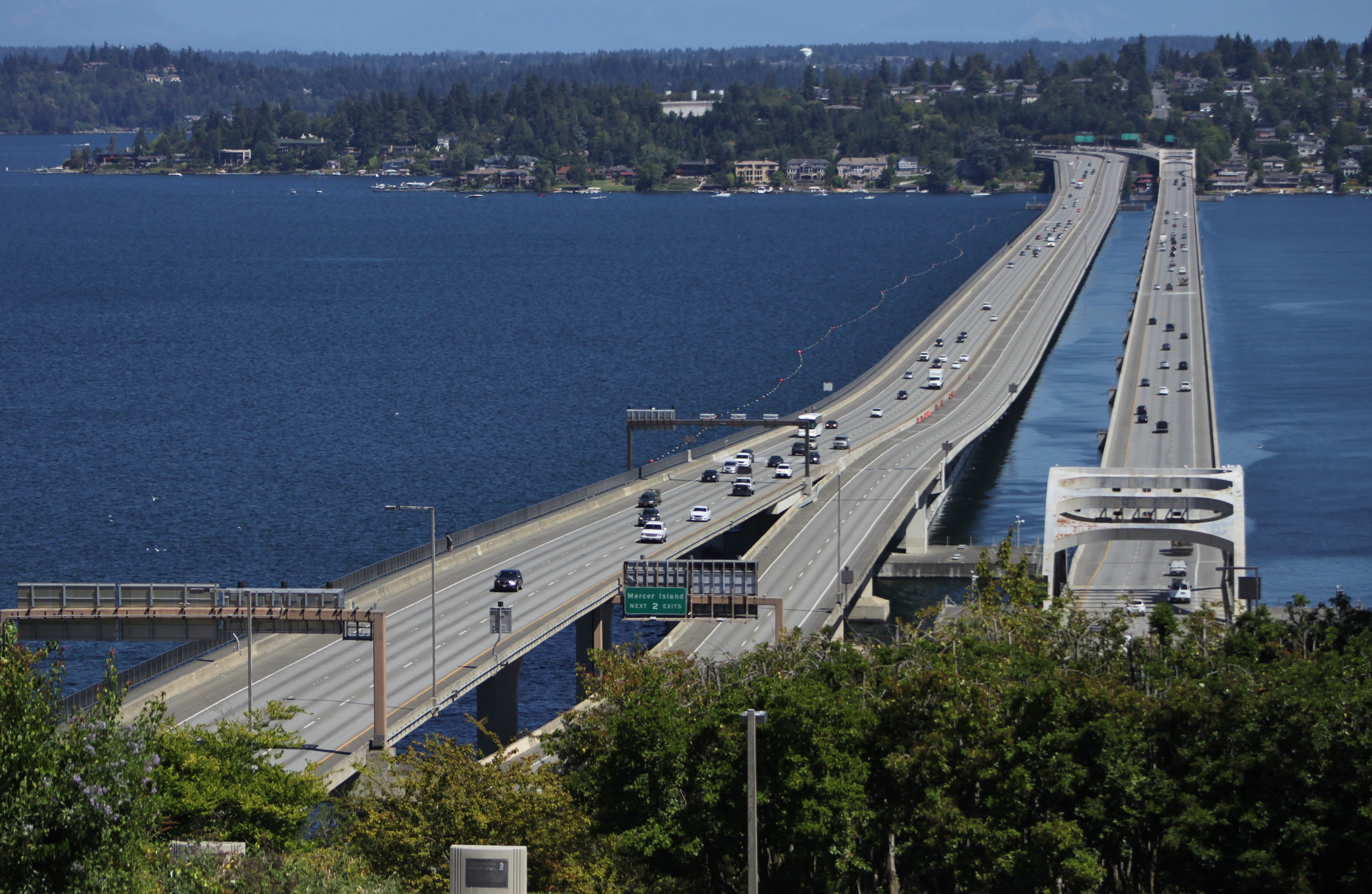
The Homer M. Hadley (left) and Lacey V. Murrow (right) floating bridges carry I-90 across Lake Washington from Seattle to Mercer Island.

Washington was the last state to complete its section of I-90, primarily due to disputes and litigation over the Seattle–Bellevue section. The Snoqualmie Pass section was completed in 1981 with a viaduct for westbound traffic that stands 150 feet (46 m) over Denny Creek. The viaduct replaced an earlier plan for a ground-level freeway at the behest of environmentalists; the Mountains to Sound Greenway was established in 1990 along the corridor between Seattle and Thorp to preserve wilderness and recreational areas and was designated as a National Scenic Byway in 1998, a first for an Interstate Highway. The extension into Seattle was completed in stages between 1989 and 1993 and cost $1.56 billion (equivalent to $3.05 billion in 2024 dollars) to construct. The project involved construction of a new floating bridge, expansion of the Mount Baker Ridge Tunnel, addition of lids with parks, and extensive mitigation for environmental and social impacts. The project was originally planned to be completed in 1992, but was delayed a year due to the sinking of the original floating bridge during renovations in November 1990; the bridge was rebuilt and opened for eastbound traffic on September 12, 1993.

Extensions at both termini of I-90 were completed in the early 2000s as part of separate projects. The west end at Washington State Route 519 in Seattle was rebuilt as a series of ramps near Safeco Field (now T-Mobile Park) to replace an existing intersection. A component of the Big Dig megaproject in Boston that extended I-90 east by 3.5 miles (5.6 km) under Fort Point Channel and Boston Harbor to Logan International Airport opened on January 18, 2003, at a cost of $6.5 billion (equivalent to $10.6 billion in 2024 dollars). The Fort Point Channel tunnel later closed in July 2006 due to a ceiling panel collapse that killed one person. It reopened in January 2007 after repairs and retrofit work.

Other sections of I-90 have been rebuilt or replaced to accommodate modern needs and meet updated safety standards. The 11-mile (18 km) Dan Ryan Expressway in Chicago was reconstructed over a two-year period from 2006 to 2007 at a cost of $975 million (equivalent to $1.42 billion in 2024 dollars), adding auxiliary lanes and improved bridges. The section carried over 300,000 daily vehicles prior to the project. Cleveland's Innerbelt Bridge, which carried I-90 over the Cuyahoga River, was replaced with the George V. Voinovich Bridges, which opened in November 2013 for westbound traffic and September 2016 for eastbound traffic. The old bridge was imploded with explosives on July 12, 2014, and dismantled by the end of the year. The states of Minnesota and Wisconsin replaced the Dresbach Bridge over the Mississippi River in 2016; the project was spearheaded by Minnesota following the I-35W Mississippi River bridge collapse in 2007.

== Names and designations ==
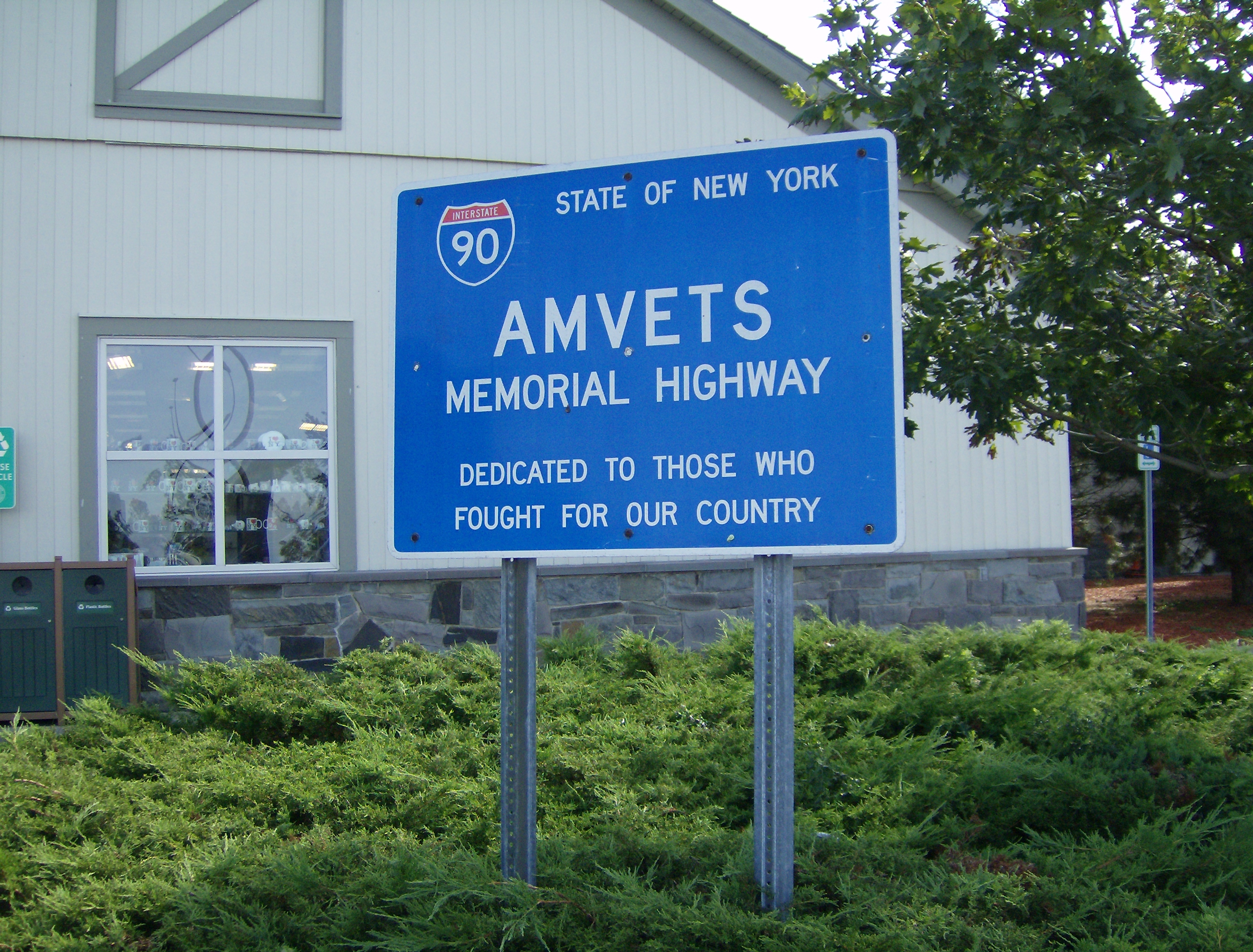
AMVETS Memorial Highway sign on I-90 in New York

I-90 carries several commemorative names designated by state governments, some of which are shared between multiple states. Washington and Minnesota designated their sections as the "American Veterans Memorial Highway". In the states of Idaho, Montana, and South Dakota, I-90 is part of the Purple Heart Trail, which honors Purple Heart recipients. In Wisconsin, I-90 and I-94 were designated as the Wisconsin Veterans Memorial Highway in 1987. From Lorain, Ohio, through Pennsylvania and New York, I-90 is officially designated as the "AMVETS Memorial Highway".

== Major intersections ==
Washington
SR 519 in downtown Seattle
I-5 in downtown Seattle
I-405 in Bellevue near Seattle
I-82 / US 97 in Ellensburg
US 395 in Ritzville; joined for 61 miles (98 km) until Spokane
US 2 / US 395 in Spokane; joined for 4 miles (6.4 km)
Idaho
US 95 in Coeur d'Alene
Montana
US 93 near Missoula; joined for 5 miles (8.0 km)
US 12 in Missoula; joined for 69 miles (111 km) until Garrison
I-15 near Butte; joined for 8 miles (13 km) through Butte
I-115 in Butte
US 191 in Bozeman; joined for 58 miles (93 km) until Big Timber
US 89 in Livingston; joined for 7 miles (11 km)
US 212 in Laurel; joined for 77 miles (124 km) until Crow Agency
US 87 in Billings; joined for 128 miles (206 km) until Sheridan, Wyoming
I-94 near Billings
Wyoming
US 14 in Ranchester; joined for 16 miles (26 km) until Sheridan
US 87 near Buffalo; joined for 12 miles (19 km)
I-25 in Buffalo
US 14 / US 16 in Gillette; joined for 25 miles (40 km) until Moorcroft
US 14 in Sundance; joined for 132 miles (212 km) until Wall, South Dakota
South Dakota
US 85 in Spearfish; joined for 8 miles (13 km)
I-190 / US 16 in Rapid City
US 83 in Murdo; joined for 22 miles (35 km) until Vivian
US 183 in Presho
US 281 near Plankinton
I-29 in Sioux Falls
I-229 in Sioux Falls
Minnesota
US 75 in Luverne
US 59 in Worthington
US 71 in Jackson
US 169 in Blue Earth
I-35 in Albert Lea
US 218 in Austin; joined for 3 miles (4.8 km)
US 63 in Stewartville
US 52 in Rochester
US 14 / US 61 in Dakota; joined for 5 miles (8.0 km) until La Crescent
Wisconsin
US 53 in La Crosse; joined for 2 miles (3.2 km) until Onalaska
US 12 in Tomah, Lyndon, and Delton
I-94 in Tomah; joined for 92 miles (148 km) until Madison
I-39 in Portage; joined for 95 miles (153 km) until Cherry Valley, Illinois
US 51 in Burke
US 151 in Madison
US 12 / US 18 in Madison
US 51 in Christiana; joined for 4 miles (6.4 km) until Albion
I-43 in Beloit
Illinois
US 51 in South Beloit; joined for 17 miles (27 km) until Rockford
US 20 in Hampshire
I-290 in Schaumburg
I-294 in Rosemont near Chicago
I-190 to O'Hare International Airport near Chicago
I-94 in Chicago; joined for 17 miles (27 km)
I-290 in downtown Chicago
I-55 in downtown Chicago
US 12 / US 20 / US 41 near Chicago
Indiana
US 41 in Hammond
US 12 in Gary
I-65 / US 12 / US 20 in Gary
I-94 / US 6 in Lake Station
I-80 in Lake Station; joined for 278 miles (447 km) until Elyria, Ohio
US 421 in New Durham Township
US 31 in South Bend
US 131 in York Township
I-69 in Fremont
Ohio
US 20 in Maumee
I-75 in Rossford near Toledo
I-280 in Lake Township
US 250 near Milan
US 42 in Cleveland
I-71 in Cleveland
I-490 in Cleveland
US 422 in downtown Cleveland
I-77 in downtown Cleveland
US 322 in downtown Cleveland
US 6 in downtown Cleveland
US 20 in Euclid
I-271 in Willoughby Hills near Cleveland
Pennsylvania
US 6N in Springfield Township
I-79 near Erie
US 19 near Erie
I-86 near Erie
US 20 near North East
New York
US 20 in Hanover
US 219 in West Seneca
I-190 in Buffalo
I-290 in Williamsville near Buffalo
I-490 near Bergen
I-390 near Rochester
I-490 near Victor
I-690 near Syracuse
I-81 in Syracuse
I-81 near Syracuse
I-790 in Utica
I-890 near Schenectady
I-88 in Rotterdam
I-890 near Schenectady
I-87 in Albany
US 9 in downtown Albany
I-787 in downtown Albany
US 4 in East Greenbush
US 9 / US 20 in Schodack
Massachusetts
US 20 in Lee
US 202 in Westfield
I-91 / US 5 in West Springfield
I-291 in Chicopee near Springfield
I-84 in Sturbridge
I-395 / I-290 in Auburn
Route 146 in Millbury
I-495 in Hopkinton
I-95 in Weston
I-93 / US 1 in Boston
Route 1A/Logan International Airport in Boston

== Auxiliary routes ==
Source: FHWA

- Rapid City, South Dakota: I-190
- Chicago, Illinois: I-190, I-290
- Cleveland, Ohio: I-490
- Buffalo, New York: I-190, I-290, I-990 (not directly connected)
- Rochester, New York: I-390, I-490, I-590 (not directly connected)
- Syracuse, New York: I-690
- Utica, New York: I-790
- Schenectady, New York: I-890
- Worcester, Massachusetts: I-190 (not directly connected), I-290

I-90 in New York is the only Interstate Highway to have a complete set of auxiliary routes, all nine possible three-digit route numbers, within a single state. Eight of the thirteen states that the highway passes through do not have auxiliary routes of I-90.

== See also ==
- Business routes of Interstate 90
