= I-90 Mississippi River Bridge =

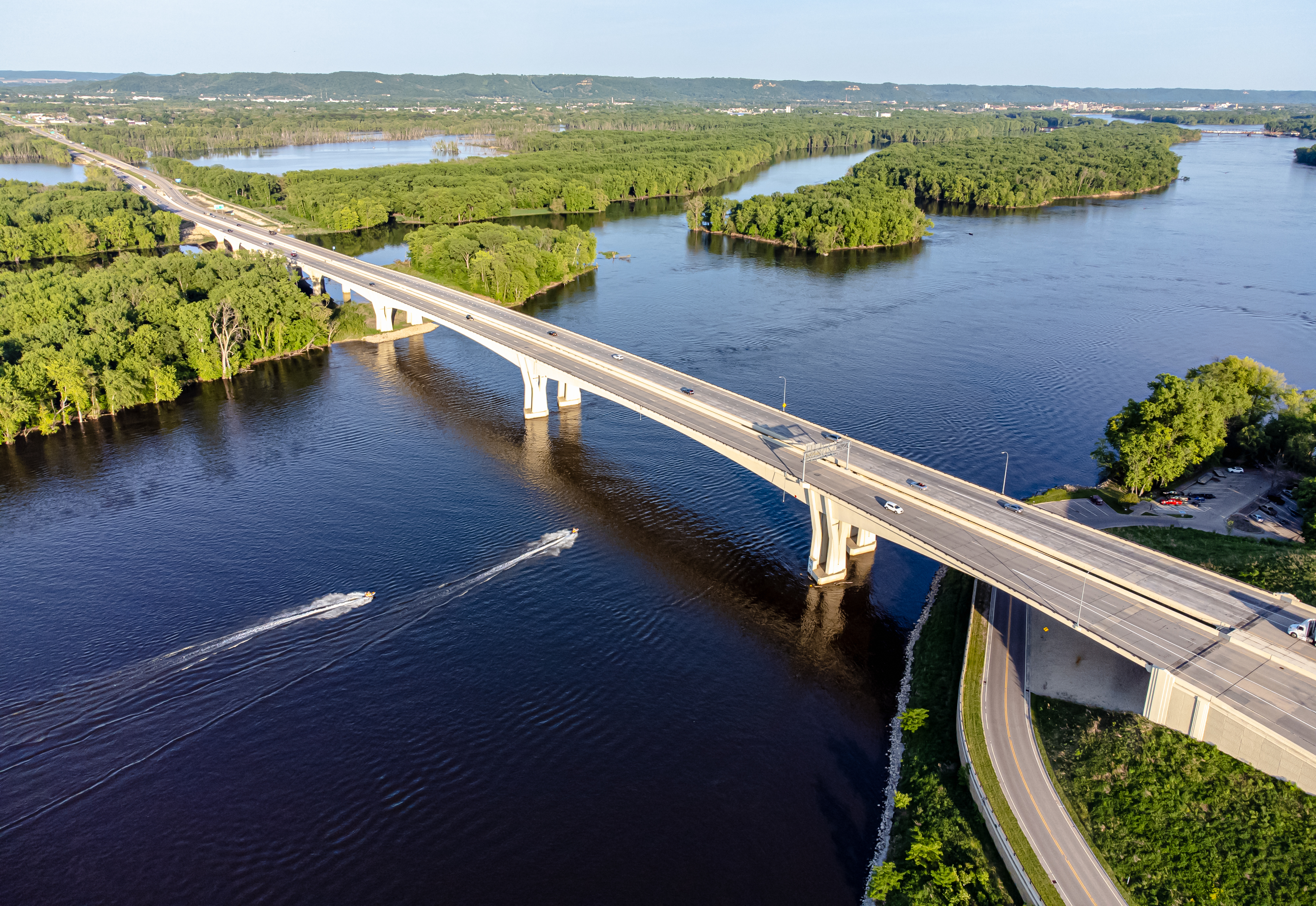
- Dresbach Bridge carrying I-90 across the Mississippi River from Minnesota
- Coordinates: 43°51′28″N 91°17′57″W
- Carries: 4 lanes of I-90
- Crosses: Mississippi River
- Locale: Dresbach, Minnesota to La Crosse, Wisconsin
- Official name: The Dresbach Bridge
- Maintained by: Minnesota Department of Transportation
- ID number: B-32-0045 (Wisconsin), 9320 (Minnesota) (previous bridge)

Characteristics
- Design: Concrete box girder bridge
- Total length: 2,593 feet (790 m)
- Width: 45 feet (14 m)-66 feet (20 m) (each span)
- Longest span: 508 feet (155 m)

History
- Opened: October 2016

Location
- Interactive map of I-90 Mississippi River Bridge

The I-90 Mississippi River Bridge, or the Dresbach Bridge, consists of a pair of parallel bridges that traverse the Mississippi River, connecting the La Crosse, Wisconsin area to Dresbach in rural Winona County, Minnesota. The current bridge was fully opened to traffic in October 2016, replacing a previous 1967 plate girder bridge. It is part of the Interstate 90 route. There is another automobile crossing a few miles south of this bridge; the Mississippi River Bridge, a combination of two bridges, and the La Crosse West Channel Bridge, connecting La Crescent, Minnesota and La Crosse, Wisconsin.

The bridge consists of a pair of parallel, concrete box girder structures over the main river channel and precast concrete girder structures over the back channels. The bridges were completed with a cost of $185.5 million, and have the following specifications:

- 100-year design life
- Length: 2,593 feet (790 m)
- Width: varies between 45 and 66 feet (14 and 20 m)
- Two 12-foot (3.7 m) lanes each direction
- Eastbound acceleration lane
- 12-foot (3.7 m) outside shoulders
- 6-foot (1.8 m) inside shoulders

The bridge connects to a redesigned I-90/US 14/US 61 interchange, and provides access to the Dresbach Rest Area/MN Welcome Center and boat launches from westbound I-90. The westbound I-90 to southbound US 14/US 61 interchange has a fly-under ramp allowing continuous movement with no competing traffic.

== History ==
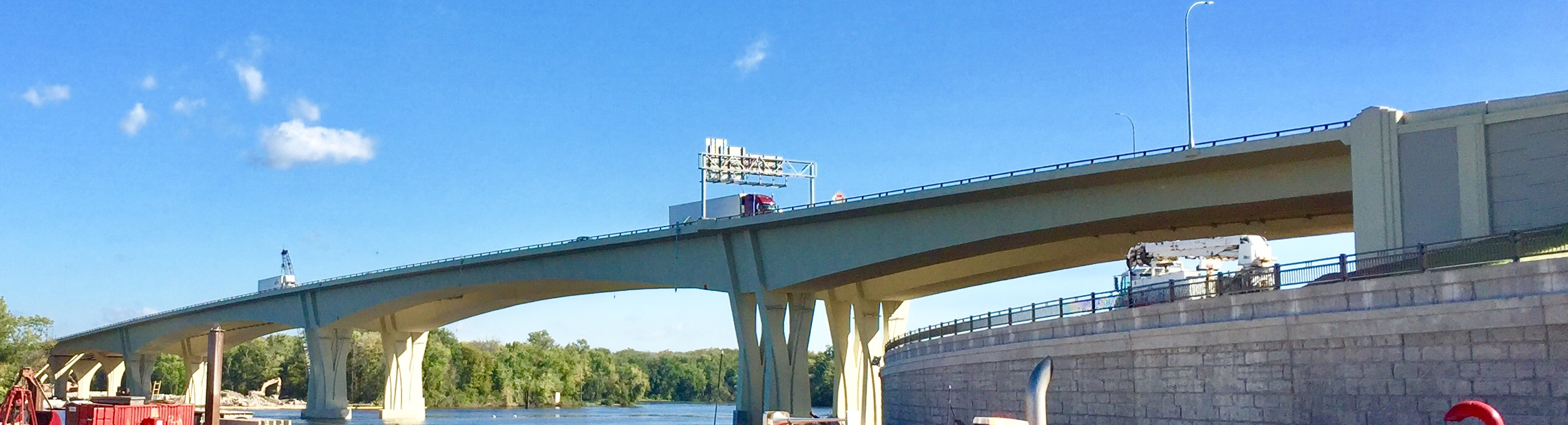

The previous bridge was a plate girder bridge that opened on October 12, 1967; the steel structure was painted dark green, and the bridge had a concrete railing. Although the previous bridge had no weight restrictions and operated at an acceptable level of service at the time of replacement, there were a number of problems with the 1967 bridge and surrounding roadways:

- The deck was deteriorating, the most pressing issue in the short term.
- The bridge was of an obsolete, non-redundant structural design similar to that of the Hoan Bridge in Milwaukee, Wisconsin, which suffered a substantial structural failure. After the Hoan Bridge incident, the I-90 Mississippi River Bridge was hurriedly inspected and found to be in satisfactory condition, but concern about the basic steel structural design remained.
- A lack of standard shoulders inhibited emergency responses to incidents on the bridge and did not provide enough room for disabled vehicles to get out the traffic lanes.
- There were issues with the interchange on the Minnesota side, including a curve on the main travel lanes that was sharper than desirable for an interstate; a confusing design; and congestion on some of the ramps.
- There were capacity problems at the Dresbach Rest Area on the Minnesota side, which had limited room for expansion. Compounding the problem, it was accessible from the eastbound direction, even though it was intended for westbound traffic only.
- There were no provisions for bicyclists and pedestrians on the bridge.

In 2006, the Minnesota Department of Transportation (MnDOT) commissioned a study on ways to rectify some or all of these issues. Some of the options that were presented included:

- Replacing the deck only, estimated cost $23 million.
- Widening and rebuilding the existing structure with either additional piers or strengthening the foundation, estimated cost $40–$58 million.
- Building a new westbound girder bridge and converting the existing bridge to eastbound only, estimated cost $63 million.
- Building a new girder bridge, extradosed bridge, or cable stayed bridge, and demolishing the existing one, estimated cost $59–$71 million.

In addition, the collapse of the I-35W Mississippi River bridge in Minneapolis, on August 1, 2007 led to the effort by MnDOT to replace or modify "fracture-critical" bridges in the state.

A concrete box girder bridge design was ultimately selected. The new bridge was constructed beginning January 2013, parallel to and upstream from the old 1967 plate girder bridge, which was demolished after it was closed April 2016.

== Gallery ==
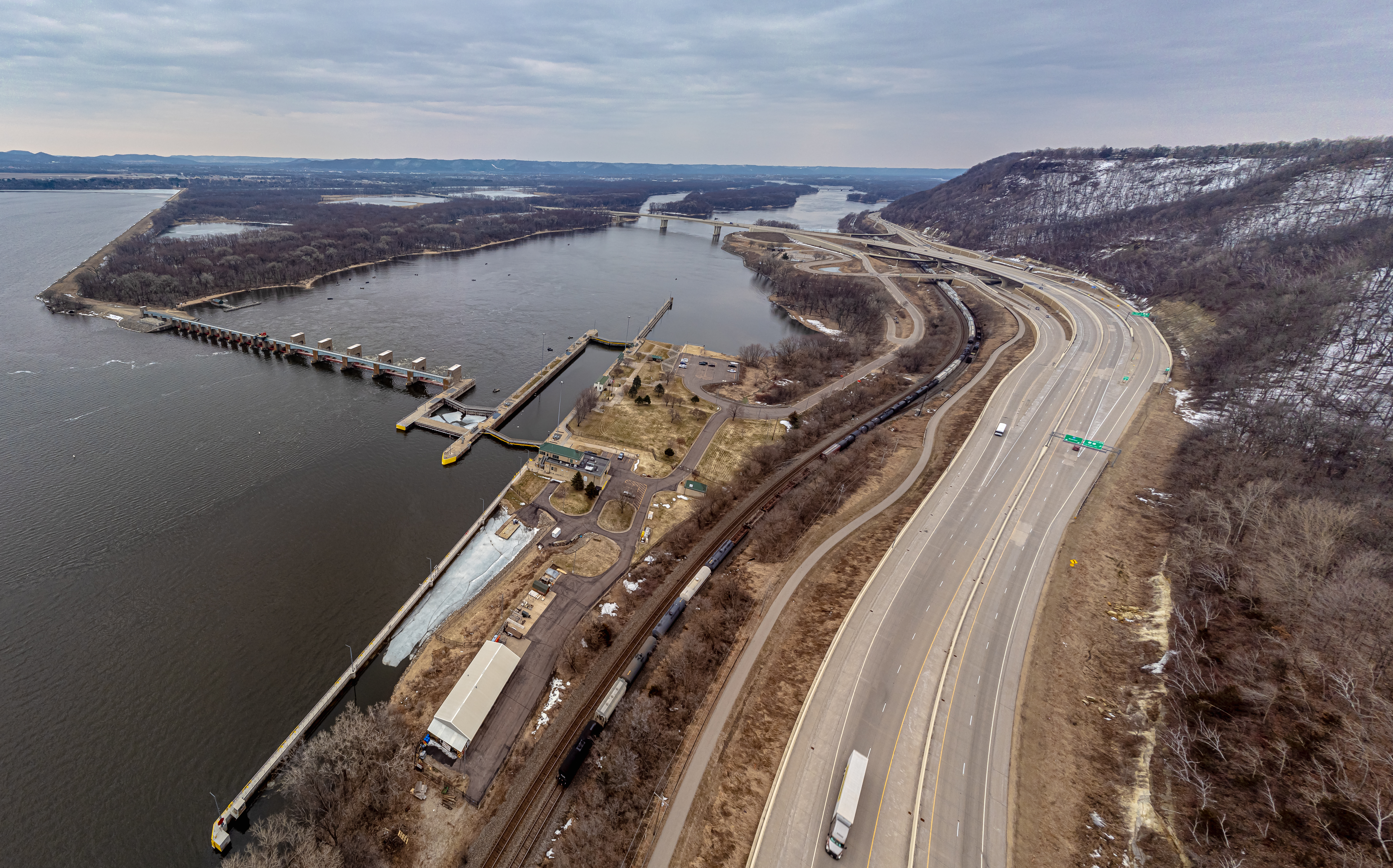
Lock and dam 7 with I-90 in the background

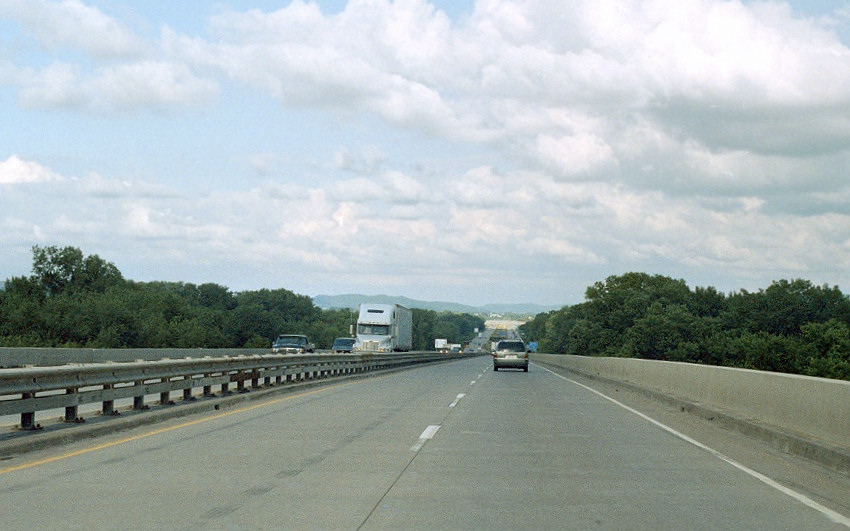
On the original 1967 I-90 bridge, looking east

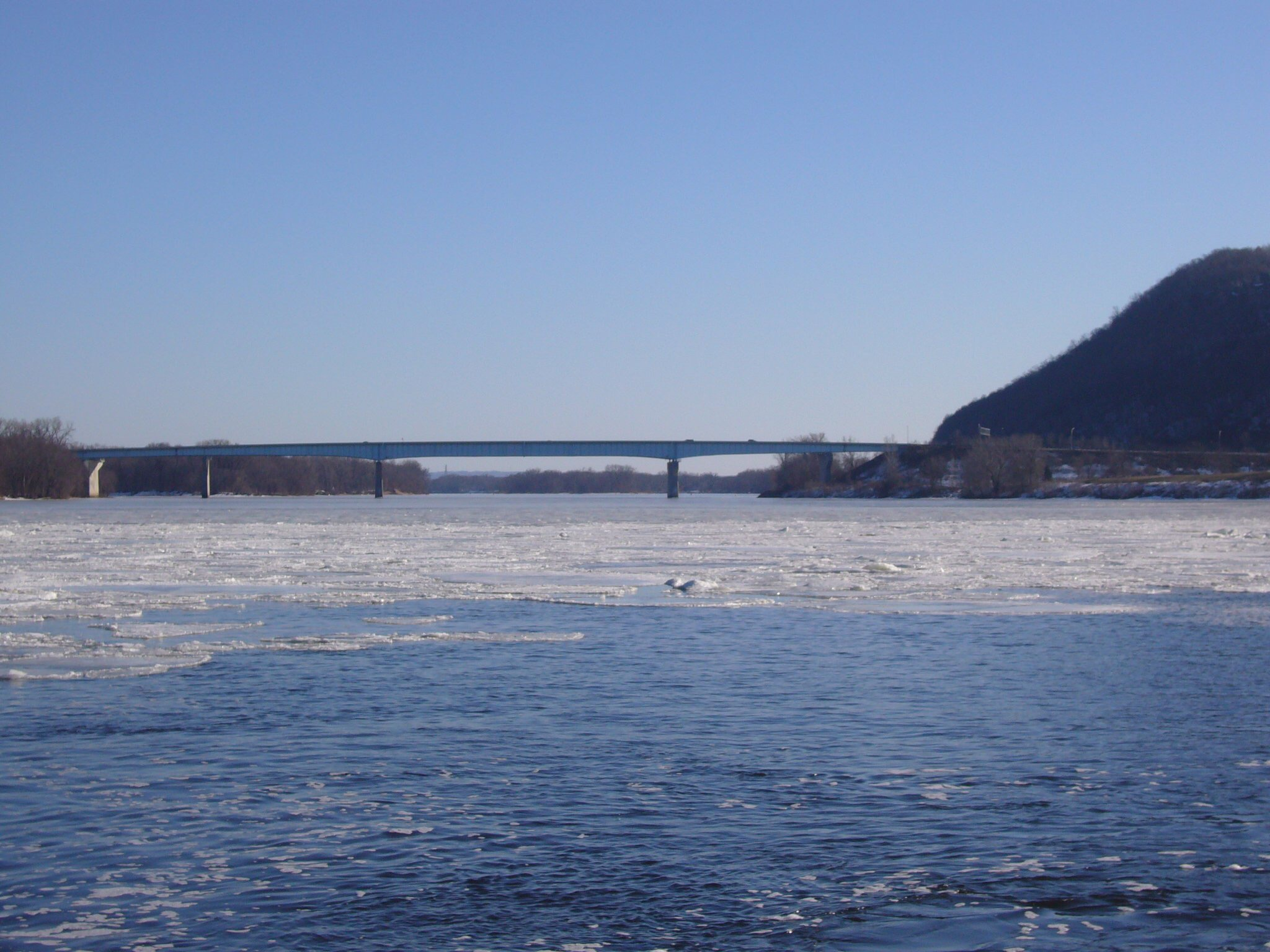
1967 Dresbach bridge, looking downstream (south)

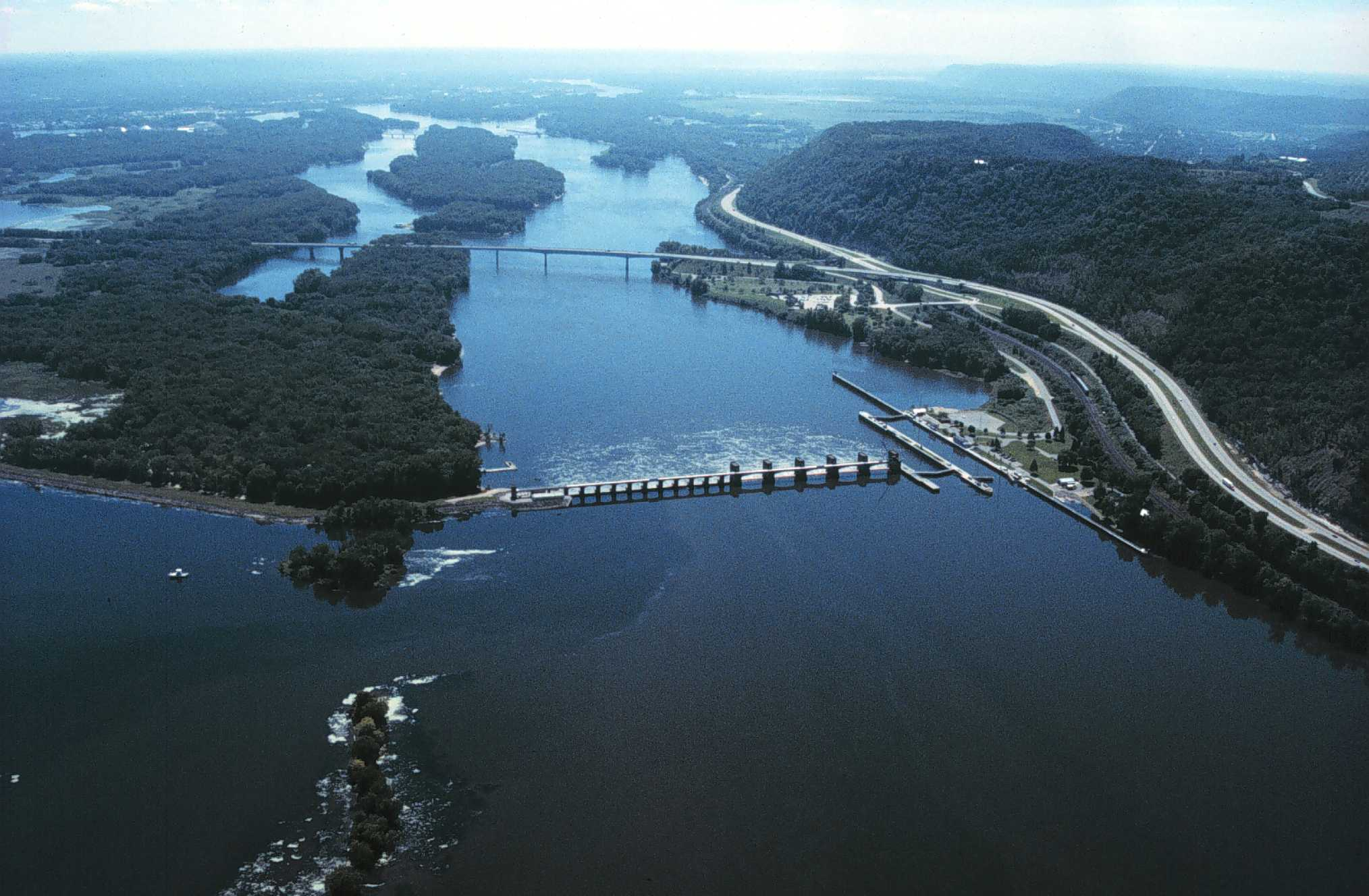
1997 aerial view looking south: 1937 Lock and Dam No. 7 in the foreground and the original 1967 Dresbach Bridge in the background.

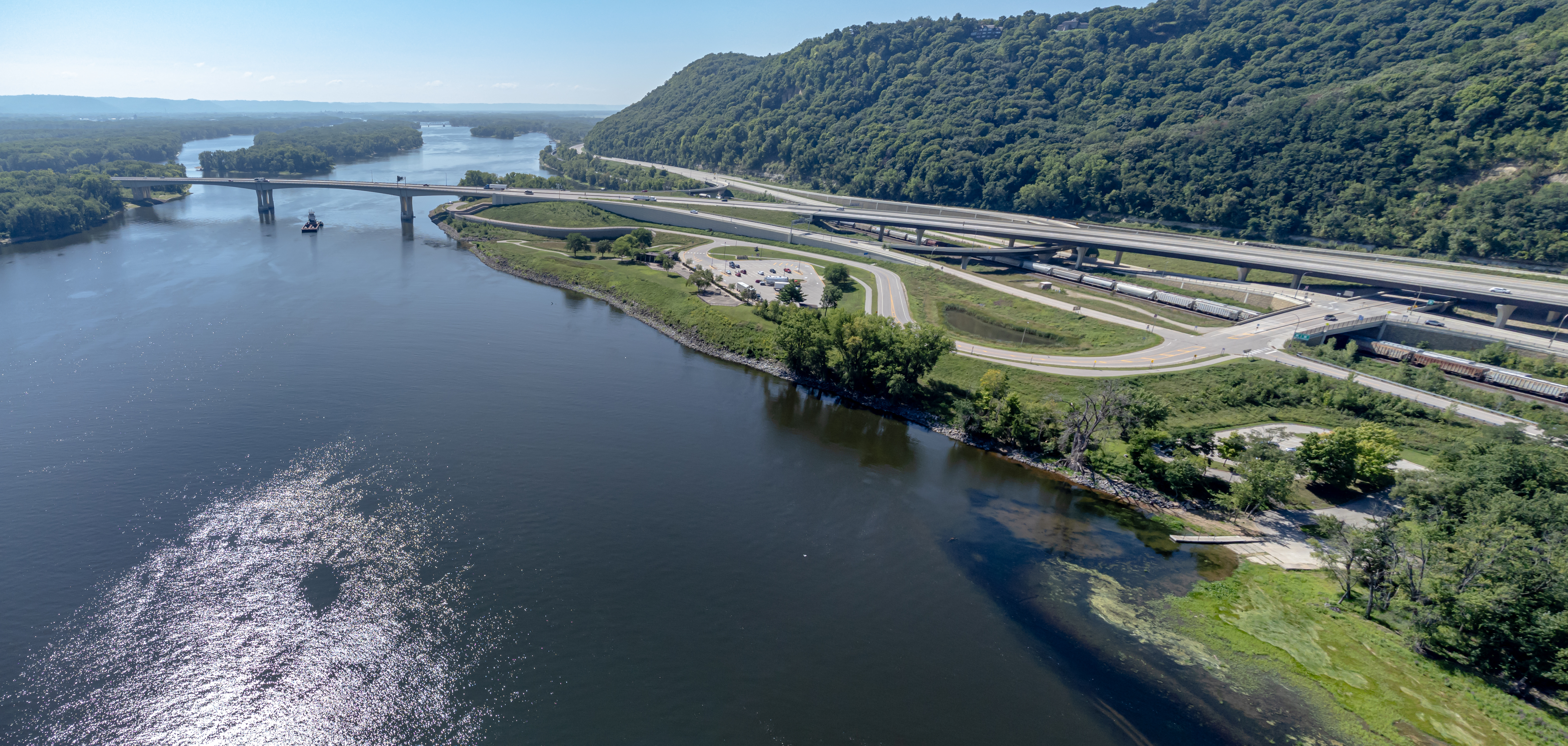
I-90 Mississippi Bridge

== See also ==
- List of crossings of the Upper Mississippi River
- Lock and Dam No. 7
