= Lewis and Clark Memorial Bridge =

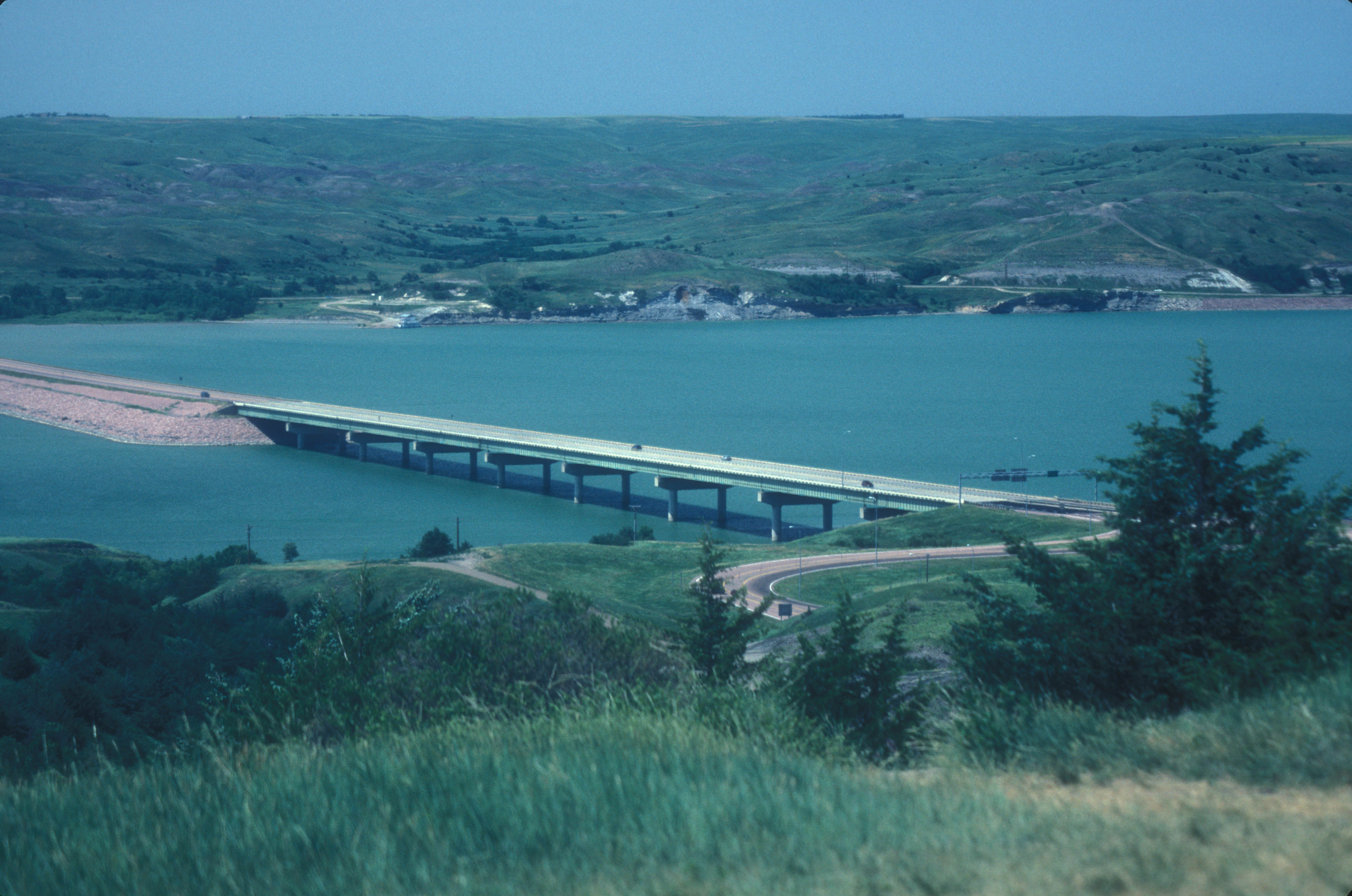
- The bridge in 2007
- Coordinates: 43°48′06″N 99°21′12″W
- Carries: 4 lanes of I-90
- Crosses: Missouri River
- Locale: Chamberlain and Oacoma, South Dakota, United States
- Maintained by: South Dakota Department of Transportation

History
- Construction start: 1967
- Construction cost: $8 million
- Opened: August 1974

The Lewis and Clark Memorial Bridge in the US state of South Dakota is a bridge that carries Interstate 90 (I-90) across the Missouri River and Lake Francis Case between Chamberlain on the east bank and Oacoma on the west bank of the river. Construction on the bridge began in 1967 and cost $8 million. It was dedicated on July 7, 1974, and was opened to traffic in August.

A historical marker, located at the Lewis and Clark Interpretive Center in Chamberlain-Oacoma, South Dakota, overlooks the bridge.

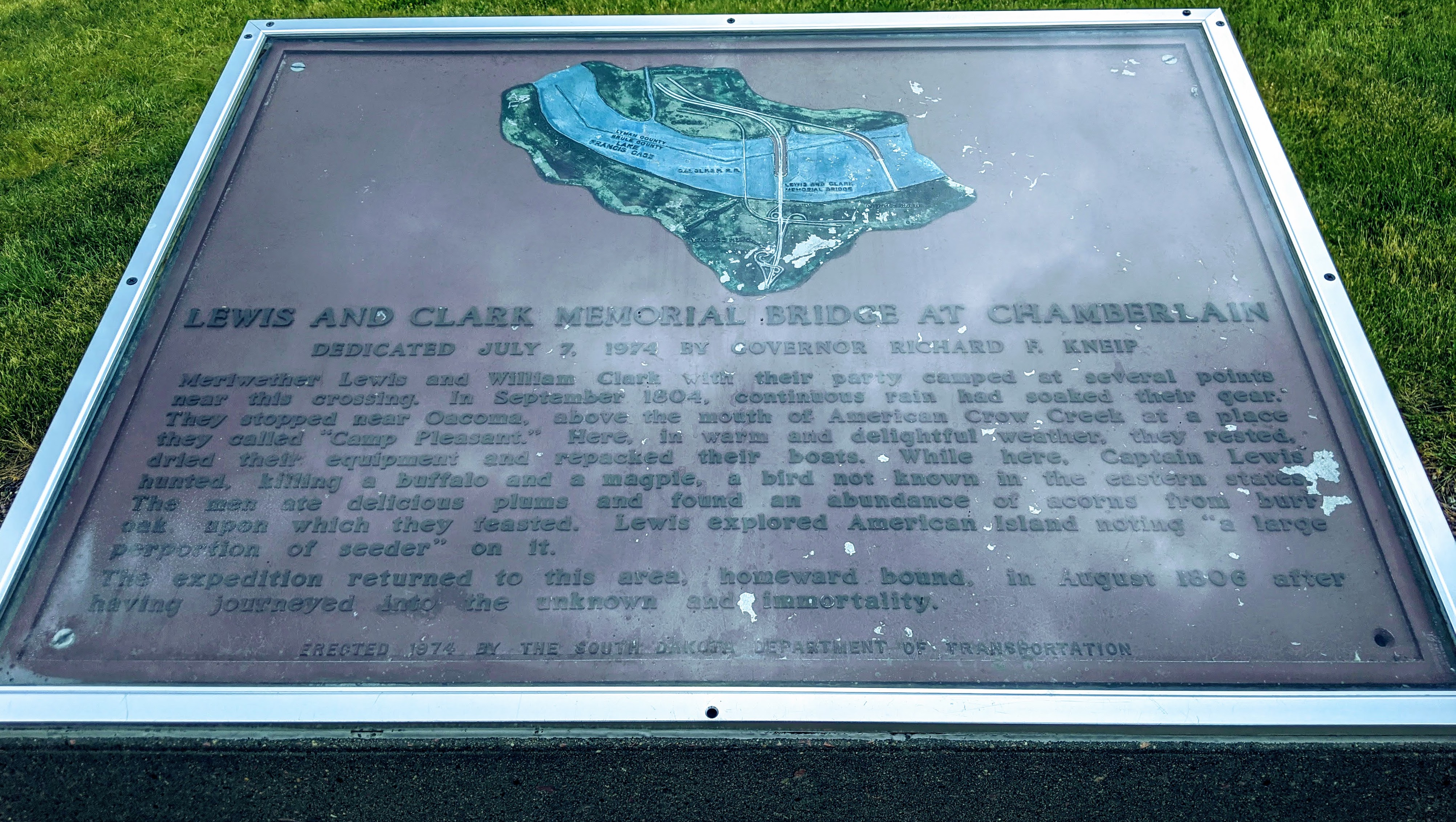
Historical marker at the Lewis & Clark Interpretive Center in Chamberlain-Oacoma, South Dakota.

== See also ==
- List of crossings of the Missouri River
