= National Register of Historic Places listings in Vernon County, Wisconsin =

Location of Vernon County in Wisconsin

This is a list of the National Register of Historic Places listings in Vernon County, Wisconsin, USA. It is intended to provide a comprehensive listing of entries in the National Register of Historic Places that are located in Vernon County, Wisconsin. The locations of National Register properties for which the latitude and longitude coordinates are included below may be seen in a map.

There are 24 properties and districts listed on the National Register in the county.

This National Park Service list is complete through NPS recent listings posted November 13, 2026.

== Current listings ==
	Name on the Register	Image	Date listed	Location	City or town	Description
1	George Apfel Round Barn	George Apfel Round Barn	December 20, 2006 (#06001155)	11314 Cty Hwy P 43°39′15″N 90°41′24″W	Clinton	Round dairy barn with ventilating cupola and a 12-foot silo in the middle, built on a hillside by Apfel and his neighbors in 1914.
2	Archeological Site No. 47 VE-881	Archeological Site No. 47 VE-881	September 30, 1993 (#93001005)	Address Restricted	Sterling	A.k.a. Baumgartner Mound.
3	B. Lawrence Site I	B. Lawrence Site I	June 30, 1975 (#75000080)	Address Restricted	Rockton	Prehistoric village site.
4	Bekkedal Leaf Tobacco Warehouse	Bekkedal Leaf Tobacco Warehouse	November 14, 2003 (#03001167)	504 E. Decker; 43°33′34″N 90°53′01″W	Viroqua	Brick warehouse designed by Parkinson & Dockendorff and built in 1906 for Martin Bekkedal, the largest wholesaler of tobacco in the region at the time. Bought in 1921 by the Northern Wisconsin Co-op Tobacco Pool.
5	Cade Archeological District	Cade Archeological District	November 3, 1988 (#88002176)	E4337 Upper Newton Road	Newton	Rock shelters and ridge-top effigy mounds of a bear, a panther, a turtle, two birds, and two linear mounds.
6	Bert and Mary Cunningham Round Barn	Bert and Mary Cunningham Round Barn	August 14, 2014 (#14000503)	E7702 A Upper Maple Dale Rd. 43°33′36″N 90°51′13″W	Viroqua	Round barn with walls of clay tile and a tile silo in the center, designed for cows on the lower floor and hay storage above. Possibly designed and constructed by Alga Shivers, a son of a slave who built many of the round barns in Vernon and Monroe counties.
7	Goose Island Archeological Site Ve-502	Goose Island Archeological Site Ve-502	July 17, 1980 (#80000199)	Address Restricted	Stoddard	
8	Hanson Petroglyphs	Hanson Petroglyphs	December 31, 1974 (#74000129)	Address Restricted	Viola	Petroglyphs of bird figures carved into a sandstone wall on a ridge above the Kickapoo River.
9	George and Mable Harris Round Barn	George and Mable Harris Round Barn	January 24, 2017 (#100000575)	S1123 Harris Rd. 43°41′19″N 90°29′43″W	Forest	Intact round barn with wooden silo in center, built by Alga Shivers in 1906.
10	Hay Valley Archeological District	Hay Valley Archeological District	December 31, 1974 (#74000130)	Address Restricted	Ontario	
11	Hillsboro Condensed Milk Company	Hillsboro Condensed Milk Company	July 2, 2021 (#100006696)	206 East Madison St. 43°39′08″N 90°20′02″W	Hillsboro	Milk-condensing plant built in 1914 by Valecia Condensed Milk, which promptly went bankrupt. A group of local businessmen picked up the project, and the plant canned milk from the surrounding dairy farms until 1956. Then served as a transit point for milk until 1966. The building now houses the Hillsboro Brewing Company.
12	Larson Cave	Larson Cave	January 6, 1988 (#87002240)	Address Restricted	Westby	Shallow cave containing petroglyphs of stick-like human figures and other shapes.
13	Charles Lord House	Charles Lord House	January 26, 1998 (#97001645)	113 South Street; 43°43′15″N 90°35′11″W	Ontario	Neoclassical-styled home built by the Sullivan brothers in 1912 for Lord, a photographer and ginseng grower.
14	Markee Site	Markee Site	August 22, 1975 (#75000081)	Address Restricted	Rockton	Early-middle Archaic campsite.
15	Masonic Temple Building	Masonic Temple Building	December 1, 2000 (#00001469)	116 S. Main St. 43°33′21″N 90°53′21″W	Viroqua	2-story cream-brick building designed by Parkinson & Dockendorff of La Crosse in Classical Revival style with Beaux Arts influence and built 1921-22, with lodge quarters on the second floor and a theater and shops on the first floor to generate revenue.
16	Norwegian Evangelic Lutheran Church and Cemetery	Norwegian Evangelic Lutheran Church and Cemetery	July 14, 1986 (#86001719)	Coon Prairie and E. Coon Prairie Rds. 43°37′49″N 90°51′12″W	Westby	Rural Lutheran church with two 80-foot towers, designed by Albert Parkinson in Gothic Revival style and built by Theodore Thorson from 1909-10, with windows from the Ford Brothers Glass Company of Minneapolis and altar from the Fond du Lac Church Furniture Company.
17	Rockton Archeological District	Rockton Archeological District	December 31, 1974 (#74000131)	Address Restricted	Ontario	
18	Nils Skumsrud House	Nils Skumsrud House	July 11, 1990 (#90000571)	southeast of the junction of SR 162 and U.S. 14/61; 43°41′48″N 91°02′13″W	Coon Valley	One-room log pioneer cabin with full dovetail corners, built in 1853 by Skumsrud, an immigrant from Biri, Norway. Now the oldest known remaining dwelling in Vernon County and part of Norskedalen.
19	Tollackson Mound Group	Tollackson Mound Group	December 15, 1997 (#97001552)	Address Restricted	Harmony	Group of 11 effigy mounds of birds and mammals on a hillside above a stream, probably made during the late Woodland period.
20	Upper Kickapoo Valley Prehistoric Archeological District	Upper Kickapoo Valley Prehistoric Archeological District	September 24, 1999 (#99001202)	Address Restricted	La Farge	More than 450 sites dating from 10,000 BC to 1150 CE, in a valley that was almost dammed, including rockshelters, burial mounds, petroglyphs, and prehistoric campsites.
21	Vernon County Courthouse	Vernon County Courthouse	January 8, 1980 (#80000200)	N. Dunlap Ave. 43°33′24″N 90°53′35″W	Viroqua	2-story limestone courthouse with a 3-story tower/belfry, designed in High Victorian Gothic style by Carl F. Struck and built in 1880. Murals inside include a scene of settlers arriving in wild Vernon County, painted by Leighton Oyen of LaCrosse.
22	Vernon County Normal School	Vernon County Normal School	July 26, 2011 (#11000479)	410 S. Center Ave. 43°33′11″N 90°53′17″W	Viroqua	3-story Prairie style building designed by Parkinson & Dockendorff and built in 1919. Nearly 2000 teachers trained here by 1972 when it closed. Now houses the Vernon County Museum.
23	Viola Rockshelter (47 Ve 640)	Viola Rockshelter (47 Ve 640)	December 10, 1987 (#87002081)	Address Restricted	Kickapoo Center	Rock shelter in a ravine along the Kickapoo River, with petroglyphs of what may be a boat and a tepee, of unknown dates.
24	Viroqua Downtown Historic District	Viroqua Downtown Historic District	July 17, 2003 (#03000669)	Main St., roughly bounded by W. Court, E. Jefferson and the odd numbered 200 blk of S. Main St. 43°33′19″N 90°53′22″W	Viroqua	Viroqua's old commercial business district, including the 1882 Italianate Casson-Purdy Block, the 1899 Queen Anne-styled Fortney Hotel, the 1899 Michel Brewing Co. Building, the 1901 Italianate Dahl/Beat drugstore/grocery, the 1908 Neoclassical First National Bank, the 1921 Neoclassical Masonic Temple/Theatre, the 1930 20th-Century Commercial Felix Store, and the 1939 U.S. Post Office.

== See also ==
- List of National Historic Landmarks in Wisconsin
- National Register of Historic Places listings in Wisconsin
- Listings in neighboring counties: Allamakee (IA), Crawford, Houston (MN), Juneau, La Crosse, Monroe, Richland, Sauk
