= National Register of Historic Places listings in Monroe County, Wisconsin =

Location of Monroe County in Wisconsin

This is a list of the National Register of Historic Places listings in Monroe County, Wisconsin. It is intended to provide a comprehensive listing of entries in the National Register of Historic Places that are located in Monroe County, Wisconsin. The locations of National Register properties for which the latitude and longitude coordinates are included below may be seen in a map.

There are 14 properties and districts listed on the National Register in the county.

This National Park Service list is complete through NPS recent listings posted July 24, 2026.

== Current listings ==
	Name on the Register	Image	Date listed	Location	City or town	Description
1	Kendalls Depot	Kendalls Depot	August 12, 1981 (#81000050)	North Railroad Street; 43°47′35″N 90°22′09″W	Kendall	Wooden hip-roofed depot of the C&NW Railway, built in 1900. Now a railroad museum and headquarters of the Elroy-Sparta bike trail.
2	Albert and Theresa Marx House	Albert and Theresa Marx House	August 16, 2007 (#07000835)	805 Cashton Avenue; 43°44′45″N 90°46′54″W	Cashton	1906 2.5-story Queen Anne home, with a 2-story round veranda with Neoclassical columns in place of the typical corner tower. Albert and his brother William ran a hardware store/carriage shop/implement dealership, a garage, Reo dealership, and music store.
3	Monroe County Courthouse	Monroe County Courthouse	March 9, 1982 (#82000689)	418 West Main Street; 43°56′37″N 90°48′44″W	Sparta	Red sandstone courthouse designed by Mifflin E. Bell in Romanesque Revival style and built in 1895.
4	St. John's Episcopal Church	St. John's Episcopal Church	March 18, 1983 (#83003406)	400 North Water Street; 43°56′49″N 90°50′36″W	Sparta	Gothic Revival-styled Episcopal church with board and batten exterior, constructed in 1862.
5	St. Lucas Evangelical German Lutheran Church and Cemetery	St. Lucas Evangelical German Lutheran Church and Cemetery	August 14, 2019 (#100004276)	30013 Oxford Rd. 43°44′40″N 90°21′09″W	Glendale	Classic rural frame church constructed in 1899 in Gothic Revival style to serve as spiritual and social center of its German Lutheran community.
6	Sparta Free Library	Sparta Free Library	September 3, 1981 (#81000051)	Court and Main Streets; 43°56′39″N 90°48′41″W	Sparta	One-story Neoclassical Carnegie Library, built 1902. Sparta's first public library.
7	Sparta High School	Sparta High School	July 26, 2021 (#100006747)	201 East Franklin St. 43°56′45″N 90°48′32″W	Sparta	School with Gothic Revival-styled accents decorating plain brick walls, designed by Parkinson & Dockendorff of La Crosse and built 1922-23 by Naset Brothers.
8	Sparta Masonic Temple	Sparta Masonic Temple	September 25, 1987 (#87001734)	200 West Main Street; 43°56′41″N 90°48′45″W	Sparta	Yellow brick Masons' hall and private club with red tile roof, designed by Parkinson & Dockendorff in Classical Revival style with Prairie School elements and built in 1923 by the Naset brothers of Sparta. Now hosts the Monroe County Museum.
9	Tomah Boy Scout Cabin	Tomah Boy Scout Cabin	November 27, 2017 (#100001856)	415 E Council St. 43°58′29″N 90°30′01″W	Tomah	Log cabin built in 1934 as a meeting hall for the local Boy Scout troop. The project was spearheaded by the Tomah Lions Club. Fred Leonard built the cabin with help from Boy Scouts, community members, and Federal Emergency Relief workers.
10	Tomah Post Office	Tomah Post Office	December 7, 2000 (#00001498)	903 Superior Avenue; 43°58′42″N 90°30′18″W	Tomah	The first dedicated post office building in Tomah, designed in Classical Revival style by architects at the US Treasury Dept and built 1927-28 by the Fred R. Comb Company of Minneapolis. Facade is almost identical to the Merrill Post Office. Now used as offices.
11	Tomah Public Library	Tomah Public Library	May 28, 1976 (#76000068)	716 Superior Avenue; 43°58′47″N 90°30′14″W	Tomah	Small 1916 Carnegie Library designed by Claude and Starck in Prairie Style, with a Sullivanesque frieze. Similar to the library in Merrill.
12	Walczak-Wontor Quarry Pit Workshop	Walczak-Wontor Quarry Pit Workshop	July 8, 1999 (#99000819)	Address Restricted	Cataract	
13	Water Street Commercial Historic District	Water Street Commercial Historic District	November 12, 1992 (#92001554)	Roughly bounded by K, Main, Bridge, and Spring Streets and Jefferson Avenue; 43°56′39″N 90°48′41″W	Sparta	Early commercial district of Sparta. Buildings include the 1870 Italianate Union Block, the 1890 Italianate Hoffman Meat Market, the 1895 I.O.O.F Hall, the 1896 Olin Block with iron-clad turret, the 1896 Romanesque Revival Williams Block (pictured), the 1896 courthouse, the 1902 Queen Anne W.E. Foote Grocery and Bakery, the 1917 Jefferson Tobacco Warehouse, the 1927 Franklin Street bridge, the Modernist 1932 Lanham Funeral Home, and the 1943 Camp McCoy USO Recreation Club.
14	William G. and Anne Williams House	William G. and Anne Williams House	June 1, 2005 (#05000531)	220 East Franklin Street; 43°56′46″N 90°48′29″W	Sparta	2.5 story Queen Anne-styled house built from 1891 to 1900, with carriage house. William was a banker, register of deeds, and led development of the Williams block downtown. Now a B&B.

== See also ==
- List of National Historic Landmarks in Wisconsin
- National Register of Historic Places listings in Wisconsin
- Listings in neighboring counties: Jackson, Juneau, La Crosse, Vernon
