= National Register of Historic Places listings in La Crosse County, Wisconsin =

Location of La Crosse County in Wisconsin

This is a list of the National Register of Historic Places listings in La Crosse County, Wisconsin. It is intended to provide a comprehensive listing of entries in the National Register of Historic Places that are located in La Crosse County, Wisconsin. The locations of National Register properties for which the latitude and longitude coordinates are included below may be seen in a map. (Note: The latitude and longitude information provided is primarily from the National Register Information System, and has been found to be fairly accurate for about 99% of listings. For 1%, the location info may be way off. We seek to correct the coordinate information wherever it is found to be erroneous. Please leave a note in the Discussion page for this article if you believe any specific location is incorrect.)

There are 73 properties and districts listed on the National Register in the county. Another property was once listed but has been removed.

This National Park Service list is complete through NPS recent listings posted October 30, 2026.

== Current listings ==
(Note: Numbers represent an alphabetical ordering by significant words. Various colorings, defined here, differentiate National Historic Landmarks and historic districts from other NRHP buildings, structures, sites or objects.)	Name on the Register	Image	Date listed (Note: The eight- or nine-digit number below each date is the number assigned to each location in the National Register Information System database, which can be viewed by clicking the number.)	Location	City or town	Description
1	10th and Cass Streets Neighborhood Historic District	10th and Cass Streets Neighborhood Historic District	December 13, 2000 (#00001534)	Roughly bounded by Main, South 11th Street, Cameron Avenue, and South 8th Street; 43°48′43″N 91°14′32″W	La Crosse	Residential district with 33 contributing properties, including many of the earliest elaborate homes in the city. These include the 1859 Italianate Laverty-Martindale house, the 1871 Italian Villa-styled Webb-Withee house, the 1874 Italianate Governor George Peck house, the 1884 Stick style Frank Burton house, the 1886 Queen Anne Crosby house, and the 1914 Prairie style Kinnear house.
2	23rd and 24th Streets Historic District	23rd and 24th Streets Historic District	November 5, 2010 (#10000839)	Generally bounded by Campbell Road, Losey Blvd. North, Main Street, Vine Street, and 23rd Street North; 43°48′52″N 91°13′14″W	La Crosse	Residential district of upper middle class homes built from 1915 to 1952 in various styles. E.g. the 1915 Lucht bungalow, the 1915 American Foursquare Thomas house, the 1926 Spanish Colonial Beach house, the 1935 Tudor Revival Spangler Rental house, the 1935 Colonial Revival Crowley Rental House, the 1940 International-style Newberg house, and the 1950 Sorensen Ranch house.
3	Agger Rockshelter	Agger Rockshelter	March 25, 1988 (#87002239)	Address Restricted	Stevenstown	
4	Mons Anderson House	Mons Anderson House	May 6, 1975 (#75000071)	410 Cass Street; 43°48′30″N 91°15′05″W	La Crosse	Gothic Revival-styled home with large square turret built from 1861 to 1877 for Anderson, a Norwegian immigrant who ran a store in La Crosse and later shifted into wholesale dry goods. The house was later used as YWCA, then apartments.
5	Bangor Commercial Historic District	Bangor Commercial Historic District	October 11, 2022 (#100008252)	1501-1630 Commercial St., 1515-1601 Bangor St., 105-106 16th Ave. North; 43°53′31″N 90°59′19″W	Bangor	2-block remnant of Bangor's old downtown, including the 1875 Holmlund Funeral Parlor, the 1898 Bangor Variety Store, the 1898 Queen Anne-style Dowe Clothing Store, the 1899 Romanesque Revival-style Bangor Opera House, the 1900 Italianate-style Elsen House Hotel, and the 1963 Contemporary-style Bangor Police Dept.
6	E.R. Barron Building	E.R. Barron Building	June 19, 1985 (#85001362)	426-430 Main Street; 43°48′43″N 91°15′02″W	La Crosse	3-story Romanesque building designed by Schick and Stoltze and built in 1891, with Edward Barron's dry goods store on the first floor, offices on the 2nd floor, and a Masonic Temple on the third floor.
7	Bell Coulee Shelter	Bell Coulee Shelter	July 9, 1997 (#97000782)	Address Restricted; 44°00′11″N 91°02′10″W	Mindoro	Rock shelter containing pictographs and petroglyphs, including 7 buffalo and a human figure, probably made by Oneota people.
8	Bridge No. 1	Bridge No. 1	February 27, 1980 (#80000146)	NW of La Crosse; 44°01′15″N 91°18′28″W	La Crosse	134-foot steel double-span bowstring arch truss bridge with wooden deck, built 1891-92 by the Clinton Bridge Company.
9	Bridge No. 2	Bridge No. 2	February 27, 1980 (#80000147)	NW of La Crosse; 44°01′16″N 91°18′38″W	La Crosse	141-foot steel double-span bowstring arch truss bridge with concrete deck, built 1891-92 by the Clinton Bridge Company.
10	Bridge No. 3	Bridge No. 3	February 27, 1980 (#80000148)	NW of La Crosse; 44°01′17″N 91°18′51″W	La Crosse	110-foot steel single-span bowstring arch truss bridge with wooden deck, built 1891-92 by the Clinton Bridge Company.
11	Bridge No. 4	Bridge No. 4	February 27, 1980 (#80000149)	NW of La Crosse; 44°01′24″N 91°19′14″W	La Crosse	131-foot steel double-span bowstring arch truss bridge with concrete deck, built 1891-92 by the Clinton Bridge Company.
12	Bridge No. 5	Bridge No. 5	February 27, 1980 (#80000150)	NW of La Crosse; 44°01′24″N 91°19′44″W	La Crosse	65-foot wood kingpost bridge, built by the Clinton Bridge Company in 1920 to replace a flood-damaged bridge.
13	Bridge No. 6	Bridge No. 6	February 27, 1980 (#80000151)	NW of La Crosse; 44°01′27″N 91°20′08″W	La Crosse	50-foot steel bowstring arch truss bridge with wooden deck, built 1891-92 by the Clinton Bridge Company.
14	Caledonia Street Commercial Historic District		November 14, 2022 (#100007132)	Both sides of Caledonia St. between Clinton and St. Paul Sts. 43°50′27″N 91°14′48″W	La Crosse	Remnant of the commercial downtown of the village of North La Crosse, including the 1883 Italianate-style Apsey Block, the 1888 Italianate Wannebo Grocery, the 1891 Italianate Willing Dry Goods store, the 1895 Queen Anne-style Horner Block (later used by an undertaker), and the 1920 Neoclassical-style Riviera Theatre.
15	John L. Callahan House	John L. Callahan House	April 14, 1995 (#95000406)	933 Rose Street; 43°50′16″N 91°14′54″W	La Crosse	2.5 story home with bell-roofed turret, designed in Queen Anne style by Schick and Stoltze and built near a lumber mill in 1894 for Callahan, a local physician who used it as home and office. Later it was a funeral parlor, then divided into apartments.
16	Cass and King Street Residential Historic District	Cass and King Street Residential Historic District	November 7, 1997 (#97001410)	Roughly bounded by State, South 21st, and Madison Streets, and West Avenue South; 43°48′36″N 91°14′00″W	La Crosse	Large residential district on the prairie between the Mississippi and the bluffs, with homes built from the 1880s to 1940s representing many styles, including the 1890 Queen Anne Gantert house, the 1891 Richardsonian Romanesque Holway house, the 1901 Tudor Revival Hixon house, the 1902 Georgian Revival Cutler house, the 1912 Prairie Style Salzer house, the 1918 Colonial Revival Scott house, the 1920 Kutzborsky bungalow, the 1922 Neoclassical First Church of Christ, Scientist and the 1924 Neogothic English Lutheran Church.
17	Chambers-Markle Farmstead	Chambers-Markle Farmstead	March 22, 1991 (#91000341)	6104 WI 35; 43°44′57″N 91°12′04″W	La Crosse	Farm begun by John Chambers in 1853. 2.5 story Queen Anne style farmhouse built of local brick for Emmanuel Markle in 1885-86, a barn built in 1923, chicken coop, smoke house, and a 1938 irrigation system that pumped water from the Mississippi.
18	Dr. H. H. Chase and Henry G. Wohlhuter Bungalows	Dr. H. H. Chase and Henry G. Wohlhuter Bungalows	June 30, 1983 (#83003400)	221 and 223 South 11th Street; 43°48′34″N 91°14′25″W	La Crosse	A pair of one-story Prairie Style bungalows, nearly mirror images, designed by Percy Bentley of La Crosse and built in 1913 for friends Chase and Wohlhuter. Chase was a dentist and Wohlhuter managed the La Crosse Theater.
19	Chicago, Milwaukee and Saint Paul Railway Passenger Depot	Chicago, Milwaukee and Saint Paul Railway Passenger Depot	December 1, 1997 (#97001512)	601 Saint Andrew Road; 43°49′56″N 91°14′49″W	La Crosse	Eclectic-styled brick depot of the Chicago, Milwaukee, & St. Paul Railway designed by A.O. Lagerstrom and built in 1927. Now the La Crosse Amtrak station.
20	Christ Church of La Crosse	Christ Church of La Crosse	June 19, 1985 (#85001361)	831 Main Street; 43°48′43″N 91°14′40″W	La Crosse	1898 Episcopal church, designed in Romanesque Revival style by M.S. Detweiler with large corner tower and locally-quarried buff limestone contrasted with red sandstone. Features a Tiffany stained-glass window.
21	Christ Evangelical Lutheran Church of Burr Oak		October 23, 2023 (#100009482)	9113 State Highway 108; 44°02′58″N 91°02′32″W	Farmington	Rural church designed in Gothic Revival style by C.G. Maybury & Son of Winona and built by Charles Schaller in 1898. Has original altar and ca 1901 pipe organ. Flanked by churchyard cemetery.
22	Congregation Sons of Abraham		September 8, 2026 (#100013402)	1820 Main Street; 43°48′42″N 91°13′44″W	La Crosse	Jewish synagogue built in 1948 in Modern Movement architectural style, yet retaining the sanctuary with ark, bimah, eternal light, classrooms, and a social hall. Designed by Boyum, Schubert & Sorenson and built by Theo. Molzahn & Sons.
23	District School No. 1	District School No. 1	March 21, 1996 (#96000303)	US 14/61 E of Jct. with WI 35; 43°45′31″N 91°11′22″W	Shelby	Rural, brick one-room school with bell tower, built in 1917 in Craftsman style with Prairie School influences. Children learned here until consolidation into the La Crosse school system in 1965. Now a bed and breakfast called the Wilson School House Inn.
24	Edgewood Place Historic District	Edgewood Place Historic District	October 28, 2010 (#10000867)	2500 block of Edgewood Pl. 43°49′08″N 91°13′09″W	La Crosse	Secluded neighborhood of period revival homes built from 1935 to 1940, including the 1937 Colonial Revival Orton house, the 1937 Tudor Revival Wittich house, and the 1940 Art Moderne Denzer house.
25	Fire Station No. 4		August 28, 2026 (#100013332)	906 Gillette Street; 43°50′47″N 91°14′37″W	La Crosse	The first modern firehouse in La Crosse, built in 1941. The city's earlier fire stations were tall and rectangular like old brick stores. J. Mandor Matson designed this station to blend in with the surrounding residential neighborhood, giving it hip roofs from Tudor Revival style and elements from Colonial Revival style like the dentil cornice.
26	Fire Station No. 5		November 24, 2021 (#100007159)	1220-1222 Denton St. 43°47′46″N 91°14′20″W	La Crosse	Oldest surviving firehouse in La Crosse, designed by Stoltze and Schick and built in 1895, originally with an equipment room in front, a 4-horse stable in back, and dormitory, offices and hayloft above. Built when the city shifted from volunteers to a paid fire department.
27	Freight House	Freight House	March 2, 1982 (#82000678)	107-109 Vine Street; 43°48′56″N 91°15′11″W	La Crosse	1880 2-story cream brick office building with triptych window and 1-story freight warehouse of the Chicago, Milwaukee and St. Paul Railway. Alongside is the plush business car of Daniel Willard when he was vice-president of the Chicago, Burlington and Quincy Railroad.
28	Joseph B. Funke Company	Joseph B. Funke Company	October 22, 2014 (#14000876)	101 State Street; 43°48′53″N 91°15′14″W	La Crosse	Brick candy factory built in 1898, with offices, salesroom, stockroom and shipping on first floor and production on upper three floors. Employed 220 at its peak. Now known as the Charmont.
29	Hamlin Garland House	Hamlin Garland House	November 11, 1971 (#71000040)	357 West Garland Street; 43°53′56″N 91°04′51″W	West Salem	The house built by William Hull in 1859 was bought by author Garland in 1893 to bring his ailing parents back to the coulee country of his youth. Garland expanded the house and wrote some of his major works there.
30	Dr. Adolf and Helga Gundersen Cottage	Dr. Adolf and Helga Gundersen Cottage	January 4, 2018 (#100001954)	1000 US 14/61; 43°49′06″N 91°16′12″W	La Crosse	Summer cottage at the northern tip of Gundersen Island designed in Scandinavian-flavored Arts and Crafts style by Percy Bentley and Otto Merman and built in 1918 for Adolf, a Norwegian immigrant doctor and founder of Gundersen Clinic.
31	HSR Building		October 2, 2026 (#100013504)	100 Milwaukee Street; 43°49′37″N 91°15′08″W	La Crosse	Low-slung, Brutalist-style building nestled among low earthen berms. Designed by Hackner, Schroeder, Roslansky & Associates as the headquarters of their architectural firm, with the original section built in 1972 and an addition to the south in 1977.
32	Gideon C. Hixon House	Gideon C. Hixon House	December 30, 1974 (#74000095)	429 North 7th Street; 43°48′58″N 91°14′49″W	La Crosse	Italianate house, started in 1859 and added to for decades. Hixon was an early lumber baron, with sawmills at the mouth of the Black River and in Hannibal MO, a leader of the La Crosse National Bank, and a state legislator. Today the house is a museum, still containing most of the furnishings from the Hixon era.
33	Gund Brewing Company Bottling Works	Gund Brewing Company Bottling Works	December 15, 2008 (#08001202)	2130 South Avenue; 43°47′32″N 91°14′35″W	La Crosse	Progressive beer-bottling factory built in 1903, designed by Louis Lehle with modern sanitization and pasteurization machines that gave Gund's beer a reliable shelf life, and electrical power that allowed an efficient plant layout. Now remodeled as apartments.
34	Holy Trinity School	Holy Trinity School	March 17, 2021 (#100006283)	1417 13th St. South; 43°47′47″N 91°14′14″W	La Crosse	Catholic parish school designed by Parkinson & Dockendorff with Prairie Style influence and built in 1909, serving as a school until 2002.
35	La Crosse Armory	La Crosse Armory	April 22, 2016 (#16000206)	2219 South Ave. 43°47′31″N 91°14′31″W	La Crosse	The building was originally built in 1902 as a stable for the Gund Brewing Company, designed by C.F. Struck in Romanesque Revival style. Starting in 1921 Gund leased the building to the Wisconsin Army National Guard as its armory.
36	La Crosse City Hall	La Crosse City Hall	October 26, 2026 (#100013558)	400 La Crosse Street; 43°49′01″N 91°14′54″W	La Crosse	6-story Brutalist-style complex designed by Hackner, Schroeder, Roslansky & Associates and built by Peter Nelson & Sons in 1970.
37	La Crosse County School of Agriculture and Domestic Economy	La Crosse County School of Agriculture and Domestic Economy	March 13, 1987 (#87000438)	700 Wilson Street; 43°52′34″N 91°13′42″W	Onalaska	Designed by Parkinson & Dockendorff of La Crosse in Collegiate Gothic style and built in 1909, this was the 5th school of Agriculture and Domestic Science in the state. Later became Onalaska High School.
38	LaCrosse Commercial Historic District	LaCrosse Commercial Historic District	September 2, 1994 (#94001064)	Roughly bounded by Jay Street, Second Street South, State Street, and Fifth Avenue South; 43°48′44″N 91°15′06″W	La Crosse	The old downtown, including the 1866 Voegle grocery and saloon, the 1870 Italianate Solberg grocery store, the 1894 Romanesque/Queen Anne Rehfuss dry goods building, the 1903 Chicago school Doerflinger department store, the 1920 NeoClassical Rivoli building, and the 1940 Moderne Hoeschler Exchange building.
39	La Crosse Plow Company Building	La Crosse Plow Company Building	February 2, 2016 (#15001055)	525 North Second Street; 43°49′01″N 91°15′05″W	La Crosse	2-story tractor factory built in 1937, an early use of curtain wall construction.
40	LaCrosse State Teachers College Training School Building	LaCrosse State Teachers College Training School Building	July 15, 1999 (#99000850)	1615 State Street; 43°48′48″N 91°13′55″W	La Crosse	Teacher training college building designed by Brust and Brust in Collegiate Gothic style and built in 1939, with support from the New Deal's PWA. A.k.a. Morris Hall.
41	Laverty-Martindale House	Laverty-Martindale House	November 23, 1977 (#77000033)	237 South 10th Street; 43°48′33″N 91°14′31″W	La Crosse	Italianate house with cupola built around 1860 for Thomas (a storekeeper and Civil War soldier) and Maria Laverty, then bought in 1868 by Stephen (mill owner, Civil War soldier, and insurance agent) & Katharine Martindale.
42	Otto and Ida Loeffler House	Otto and Ida Loeffler House	July 22, 2019 (#100004206)	1603 Main St. 43°48′42″N 91°13′57″W	La Crosse	Georgian Revival-styled house built in 1909, with wide eaves and exposed rafters drawn from Craftsman style, and a polygonal bay drawn from Queen Anne. Otto was an immigrant from Pomerania who with his brother ran a clothing and tailor business in La Crosse, and later sold imported wines and liquors.
43	Losey Memorial Arch	Losey Memorial Arch	May 30, 2002 (#02000598)	1407 La Crosse Street; 43°49′06″N 91°14′07″W	La Crosse	Classical Revival arch designed by Hugo Schick and built in 1901 at entry to city cemetery. Joseph Losey was a local attorney who worked to beautify the cemetery in the late 1800s.
44	Main Hall/La Crosse State Normal School	Main Hall/La Crosse State Normal School	March 14, 1985 (#85000579)	1724 State St., Univ. of WI, La Crosse; 43°48′49″N 91°13′47″W	La Crosse	First building of the state teacher training school which would become UW-La Crosse. Designed in Renaissance Revival style by Van Ryn & DeGelleke and built 1908 to 1909, this building was the entire school for its first 11 years.
45	Maria Angelorum Chapel	Maria Angelorum Chapel	March 29, 2006 (#06000204)	901 Franciscan Way; 43°48′14″N 91°14′37″W	La Crosse	Chapel of the Franciscan Sisters of Perpetual Adoration, designed by Eugene R. Liebert in Romanesque Revival style and built 1901-1906, with altar and pews built by the Egid Hackner altar company of La Crosse.
46	Midway Village Site	Midway Village Site	December 18, 1978 (#78000111)	West of Holmen	Holmen	Archeological site where Woodland, Mississippian and Oneota people left behind pottery, stone tools, a few copper tools, and evidence that some of them grew corn and beans.
47	Mindoro Cut	Mindoro Cut	May 15, 2007 (#07000428)	County Road C, between Mindoro and West Salem; 43°58′26″N 91°05′42″W	Hamilton	74-foot deep hand-hewn cut, threaded by Highway 108 through the top of Phillips Ridge. Dug in 1907 with picks, shovels, wheelbarrows and dynamite, it is believed to be the second deepest hand-hewn cut in the U.S., and the only one that survives largely unaltered.
48	Carl August Mundstock Farm	Carl August Mundstock Farm	November 21, 1994 (#94001332)	US 14/61, N side, E of jct. with WI 35; 43°45′36″N 91°11′12″W	Shelby	Farm includes gambrel-roofed barn, 1906 Queen Anne-styled brick farmhouse, and outbuildings. Now the Four Gables B&B.
49	Frank Eugene Nichols House	Frank Eugene Nichols House	February 11, 1993 (#93000027)	421 North Second Street; 43°53′10″N 91°14′10″W	Onalaska	1888 Queen Anne-styled house built on a knoll overlooking Lake Onalaska by local lumber baron Nichols, with original matching carriage house and cast-iron fence.
50	Oak Grove Cemetery		December 11, 2023 (#100009621)	1407 La Crosse Street; 43°49′08″N 91°13′51″W	La Crosse	Began as a private, secular cemetery in 1851 named Wautonga. Improved starting in 1872 with Henry Bliss and John Thorpe designing sections to fit the rural cemetery aesthetic, with paths meandering over the hills through naturalistic clumps of trees. Includes a mausoleum, family memorials, and a memorial to Civil War vets.
51	Oehler Mill Complex	Oehler Mill Complex	May 22, 2013 (#13000314)	W5539 & W5565 County Road MM; 43°45′11″N 91°11′05″W	Shelby	Rural flour and grist mill built in 1862 on Mormon Creek by German immigrants Valentine and Gottfried Oehler, along with a large root cellar built in 1876 and both brothers' Italianate homes built in the 1880s.
52	Will Ott House	Will Ott House	January 15, 1980 (#80000152)	1532 Madison Street; 43°48′24″N 91°13′58″W	La Crosse	Classic Queen Anne home with 3-story turret and interior finished in various hardwoods. Designed by Schick and Stoltz and built in 1900. Ott was the president of Segelke and Kohlhaus Manufacturing.
53	Our Lady of Sorrows Chapel	Our Lady of Sorrows Chapel	September 11, 1986 (#86002302)	519 Losey Boulevard South; 43°48′19″N 91°13′08″W	La Crosse	Gothic Revival chapel designed by Schick and Stoltze and built in 1891 as a burial place for bishops and priests of the La Crosse Diocese.
54	Overhead Site	Overhead Site	December 18, 1978 (#78000112)	Address restricted	La Crosse	Archaeological site next to Pammel Creek, occupied by various peoples, evidenced by Archaic points, Hopewell burials, Middle Woodland ceramics, and decorated Oneota ceramics.
55	Palmer Brother's Octagons	Palmer Brother's Octagons	August 7, 1979 (#79000092)	358 North Leonard Street and WI 16; 43°54′05″N 91°04′54″W	West Salem	Two octagon houses, built in Neshonoc and later moved to West Salem when the railroad bypassed Neshonoc. Monroe Palmer was a mill owner who built the first house around 1855. His brother Dr. Horace Palmer built the second house around 1860.
56	Physical Education Building/La Crosse State Normal School	Physical Education Building/La Crosse State Normal School	April 11, 1985 (#85000791)	UW La Crosse Campus off US 16; 43°48′52″N 91°13′48″W	La Crosse	3-story red brick building housing gymnasium and pool, designed by Parkinson & Dockendorff in Collegiate Gothic style and built in 1916. A.k.a. Wittich Hall.
57	Powell Place	Powell Place	December 22, 1983 (#83004299)	200-212 Main Street; 43°48′47″N 91°15′12″W	La Crosse	Red-brick Italianate commercial building with metal window hoods, cornice, and columns, built by Benjamin Healey in 1878. Among other occupants, Dr. David Franklin Powell had offices in the building from 1881 to 1891. He had been an army scout, an army surgeon, traveled with Buffalo Bill's Wild West Show, sold patent medicines like White Beaver's Cough Cream, and served as mayor of La Crosse four times.
58	W. A. Roosevelt Company	W. A. Roosevelt Company	February 16, 1984 (#84003690)	230 North Front Street; 43°48′53″N 91°15′13″W	La Crosse	5-story Chicago-style warehouse with offices, designed by Parkinson & Dockendorff and built in 1916. Roosevelt Co. was a regional wholesaler of plumbing, heating and electrical supplies.
59	Roosevelt School	Roosevelt School	August 7, 2017 (#100000924)	1307 Hayes Street; 43°51′16″N 91°14′17″W	La Crosse	2-story school designed in Spanish Colonial Revival style by Otto Merman and built in 1923 by Peter Nelson and Son. Now an apartment complex.
60	Samuels' Cave	Samuels' Cave	June 11, 1991 (#86003275)	Address restricted	Barre Mills	Rockshelter containing petroglyphs and pictographs of human forms and animals, probably created by Oneota people.
61	Sand Lake Archeological District	Sand Lake Archeological District	April 20, 1984 (#84003694)	Address Restricted	Onalaska	Oneota village site, with ridged fields nearby. Features included post molds arranged in ovals (probably wigwam-like shelters), shell-tempered potsherds, end-scrapers, deer mandibles, elk scapula, and some Woodland-era potsherds.
62	Sand Lake Site (47Lc44)	Sand Lake Site (47Lc44)	June 30, 1983 (#83003401)	Address Restricted	Onalaska	Here ridged fields of the Oneota were rapidly covered by sediments around 1450 AD, preserving remnants of corn, squash, beans and tobacco, hoes made from bison and elk scapulas, and other tools.
63	Smith Valley School	Smith Valley School	July 30, 1981 (#81000044)	4130 Smith Valley Road; 43°50′40″N 91°10′40″W	La Crosse	Rural one-room school built in 1887 by Seidenberg and Hemke. Served the valley until 1977.
64	Swennes Archaeological District	Swennes Archaeological District	July 18, 1985 (#85001573)	Address Restricted	Onalaska	Oneota camp (possibly winter camp) with storage pits and hearths.
65	Derwood and Myrtle Trimbell House	Derwood and Myrtle Trimbell House	May 10, 2022 (#100007696)	224 Van Ness St. North; 43°53′55″N 91°04′39″W	West Salem	Prairie Style house designed by Percy Bentley and Otto Merman and built in 1920 for the family of Derwood Trimbell, who published the West Salem Nonpareil newspaper.
66	U.S. Fish Control Laboratory	U.S. Fish Control Laboratory	September 17, 1981 (#81000045)	Riverside Park; 43°49′06″N 91°15′20″W	La Crosse	Facility built in 1924 which rescued fish from flooded lands and distributed them, "infected" with glochidia, to other areas. Also studied how to control the sea lamprey.
67	Valley View Site	Valley View Site	December 15, 1978 (#78000113)	North of Medary	Medary	Small, palisaded Oneota village site, on a terrace above the La Crosse River.
68	James Vincent House	James Vincent House	October 20, 1988 (#88002024)	1024 Cass Street; 43°48′31″N 91°14′28″W	La Crosse	Well-preserved brick Italianate home with Queen Anne elements, designed by W.L. Carroll and William Parker and built in 1885, with the interior finished in various hardwoods. Vincent was a lumber man, co-owning one of the first lumber yards in La Crosse.
69	War Eagle Shipwreck (sidewheel steamboat)	War Eagle Shipwreck (sidewheel steamboat)	March 26, 2020 (#100005114)	Adjacent to Riverside North Park in the Black River; 43°49′24″N 91°15′26″W	La Crosse	225-foot oak-hulled sidewheel steamer built in 1854 in Fulton, Ohio to transport passengers and freight on the Mississippi between Galena and St. Paul. Most notably, in 1861 it helped transport the 1st Minnesota Volunteer Infantry to fight at Bull Run and Gettysburg. Sank in 1870 when kerosene caught fire during loading, with 7 lives lost.
70	Waterworks Building	Waterworks Building	July 27, 1979 (#79000093)	119 King Street; 43°48′38″N 91°15′11″W	La Crosse	City pumping station for the fire hydrant system. Brick Romanesque Revival building designed by John A. Cole, built in 1880, and expanded around 1890.
71	Wisconsin Telephone Company Building	Wisconsin Telephone Company Building	March 7, 1985 (#85000491)	125 North 4th Street; 43°48′48″N 91°15′03″W	La Crosse	Neoclassical building with terra cotta ornamentation, designed by H. J. Esser of Milwaukee and Hugo Schick of La Crosse and built in 1901 for the Wisconsin Telephone Company, which figured in an important Wisc. Supreme Court case. Remodeled in 1920 by Otto Merman as the Security Savings Bank.
72	Razy and John Wright House	Razy and John Wright House	November 22, 2021 (#100007152)	W5670 Cty. Rd. F 43°48′43″N 91°11′16″W	Medary	Whimsical stone-clad cottage built in 1924, combining elements of Arts and Crafts, Tudor Revival, Rustic and Storybook styles. Razy was a dressmaker and businessperson; John was a fireman. The design is attributed to Otto Merman.
73	George Zeisler Building	George Zeisler Building	February 25, 1993 (#93000069)	201 Pearl Street; 43°48′46″N 91°15′15″W	La Crosse	Small brick Italianate-styled commercial building built in 1886 as a "sample room" for Zeisler's Plank Road Brewery.

== Former listings ==
	Name on the Register	Image	Date listed	Date removed	Location	City or town	Description
1	William W. Cargill House		1974 (#74002337)	1978	235 West Ave., S.	La Crosse	Demolished in 1975.
2	West Salem Village Hall		September 14, 1981 (#81000046)	June 15, 1984	103 South Leonard Street	West Salem	1897 brick municipal building with bell tower. Demolished in 1982.

== See also ==
- List of National Historic Landmarks in Wisconsin
- National Register of Historic Places listings in Wisconsin
- Listings in neighboring counties: Houston (MN), Jackson, Monroe, Trempealeau, Vernon, Winona (MN)
