= Weinbrenner Shoe Factory =

- U.S. National Register of Historic Places
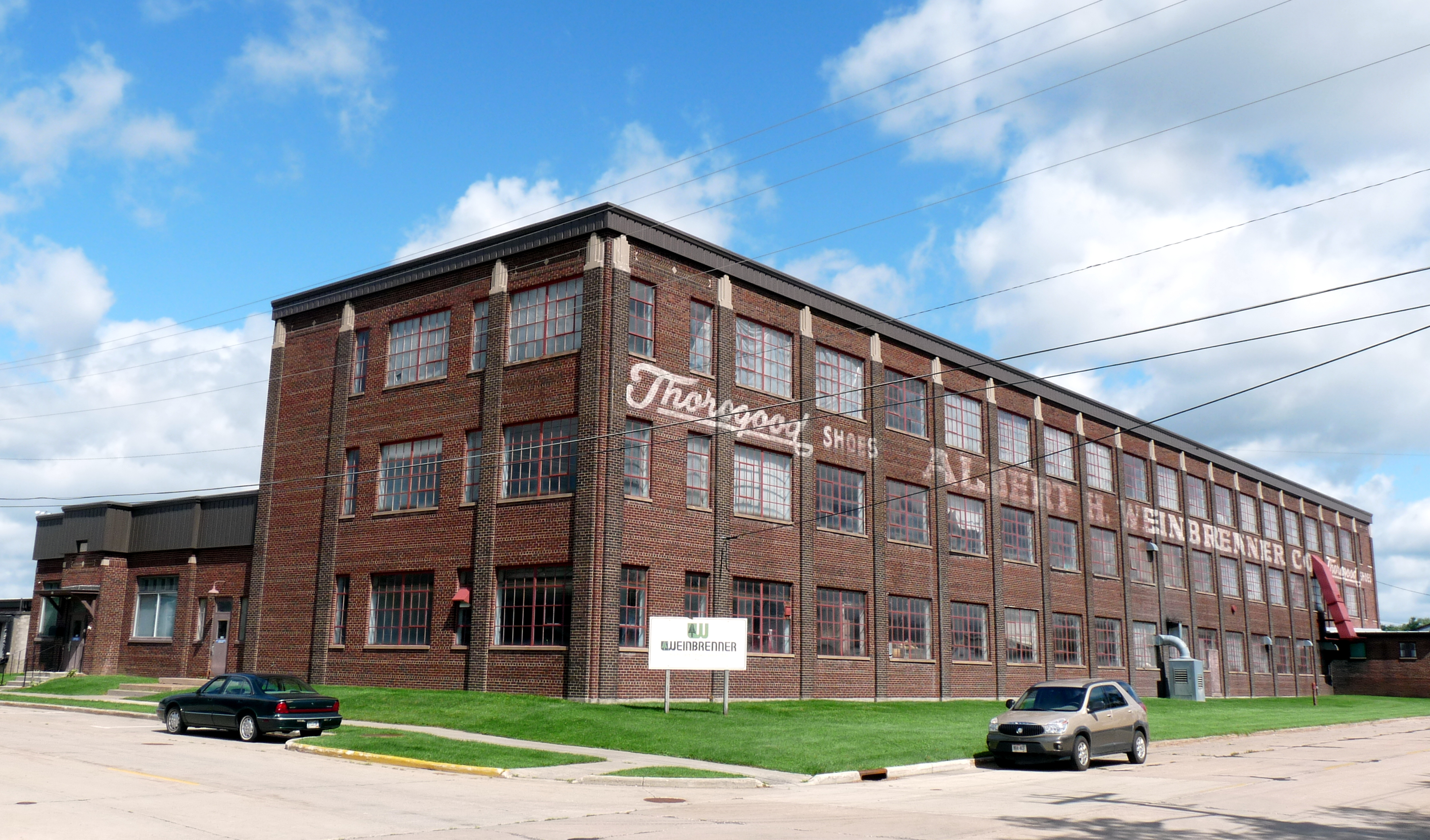
- Location: Shoe Factor, Marshfield, Wisconsin
- Built: 1935
- Architect: Gus Krasin
- Architectural style: astylistic utilitarian with Art Deco influence
- NRHP reference No.: 08000841
- Added to NRHP: August 27, 2008

The Weinbrenner Shoe Factory is a brick-clad factory complex designed by Gus Krasin, started in 1935 during the Great Depression by the city of Marshfield and the FERA, aiming to coax the Weinbrenner Shoe Company to move jobs to Marshfield. In 2008 the factory was placed on the National Register of Historic Places, considered locally significant for its association of the city with Weinbrenner, whose arrival was important to the city during difficult times. It is also significant as "the only intact historic manufacturing facility remaining in Marshfield."

== History ==
Marshfield began in 1872 when the Wisconsin Central Railroad built its line through the wilderness, pushing north toward Ashland. Six years later in 1878, William Upham and his family started a large sawmill to cut logs delivered by the railroad from the forests up north. The sawmill stood just kitty-corner to the north of the current shoe factory, with a mill pond in the low area to the west that is now Miller Park. Over the years, the Uphams expanded their manufacturing operation to include a furniture factory on the block that now holds the shoe factory.

However, the forests to the north eventually ran out. Upham's planing mill closed in 1899. Manufacturing of wood products continued, but Marshfield's economy began to diversify, serving the surrounding agricultural businesses, and adding a brewery, Felker Brothers steel products, and Marshfield Canning Co.

By 1934 the U.S. was in the Great Depression. Marshfield was short on jobs and commerce. The Upham furniture factory had closed and the city had bought it and was demolishing the old wooden buildings as make-work for the unemployed, using funds from the New Deal's Federal Emergency Relief Administration. In that environment, H.C. Bartmann who owned a shoe store in Marshfield, returned from a visit to the Weinbrenner company in Milwaukee with news that the shoe manufacturer was interested in moving some of their production to a smaller town.

The Weinbrenner Shoe Company had been founded in Milwaukee in 1892 to make work boots for loggers - founded by Albert H. Weinbrenner and Joseph Peffer. Starting as a small shop, it grew, merged with another shoe factory, and in 1909 built a new four-story factory at 226 E. Juneau St. These changes at Weinbrenner were typical of the shoe industry before the Depression: more centralization, more mechanization, and less-skilled workers. The centralization trend changed around the time of the Depression, as high overhead and labor costs in the cities pushed shoe companies to decentralize, moving production to smaller towns.

When Marshfield leaders heard of the possible factory and jobs, they arranged a trip to visit Weinbrenner in Milwaukee, and invited the CEO to consider Marshfield for their factory. The communities of New London, Stoughton and Baraboo also courted Weinbrenner, but in early May of 1935 Weinbrenner signed a contract with Marshfield. With that, the city moved fast, setting up the Marshfield Industrial Foundation to manage the project. They financed the project by issuing mortgage notes, arranging more FERA funding, and through some contribution from Weinbrenner. Marshfield architect Gus Krasin designed the 3-story factory building, and construction began in late May.

Once in operation, the factory was to benefit the local economy, but the city made sure that the construction phase did too. The architect was from Marshfield. The general contractor was Marshfield Construction, with most of the workers local. Lumber, sand, gravel and cement were supplied locally. Wausau Iron Works built the steel frame of the building. Noll Appliance of Marshfield installed the windows. Schreiner & Sons installed heating and plumbing systems. William Merkel wired the building, and Felker Brothers built the smoke stack.

Training of workers to make shoes in the factory began that summer, at the Purdy vocational school a few blocks away. The contract called for mostly local people to work in the factory, with no more than five families brought in from outside the area. At the start, employees were about 45% men and 55% women. On Weinbrenner's side, the contract spared them the up-front cost of building a factory in a time when the economy was weak.

The main block of the factory is three stories tall with a footprint 272 by 52 feet - the full length of the city block. It is typical of factory buildings of that day, classed as an "industrial loft" type of building, characterized as:

A multistory building with relatively large, open floor areas - lofts - in which various types of light manufacturing operations are housed. The program of an industrial loft is to provide adequate light, ventilation, and materials handling devices for production areas as unobstructed as possible by columns and auxiliary functions, such as elevators.

The main block has large windows to admit light, separated by pilaster strips of darker brick, capped with Art Deco-style ornaments. Across the northeast side is painted in large letters "Thorogood SHOES, ALBERT H. WEINBRENNER CO. Thorogood SHOES". The original 1935 plant included a one-story office block on the southwest and another one-story block in the middle of the southwest side.

In less than four months, in mid-September, the new factory was ready to open. Tim Heggland observes in the NRHP nomination, "That so much was accomplished in so short a time was a tribute to everyone involved and shows what could be done when all the resources of a city were marshaled to achieve a common goal." The city celebrated by crowning a Queen of Industry in the factory to the music of choirs and the 135th Regiment Band.

Shoe production began in November 1935 with almost 200 employees. The city retained ownership of the building, leasing it to Weinbrenner for ten years, with Weinbrenner holding the option to renew for two more decades. The move was a success, and Weinbrenner continued decentralizing, opening new plants in Merrill and Antigo in 1936. Surviving the lean years of the Depression and the boom of World War II, the Marshfield factory had produced over 9 million pairs of shoes and boots by 1945.

One-story additions were made to the factory in 1937-1941 and 1945-1948, both designed by Gus Krasin and with the exterior styled to match his original 1935 design. More workspace was created in 1956 when an interior courtyard was filled.

Gus A. Krasin, the architect, was born in Volynia, Russia in 1885, and at age seven immigrated with his family to the U.S. After some moves, his family farmed near Tigerton. In 1903 he left the farm to become a carpenter. In 1907 he had his brother started a contracting firm in Tigerton, while Gus took correspondence courses on architecture. In 1909 he and his brother moved their firm to Marshfield, where he ran an architecture practice from 1910 on. He was the only professional architect in Marshfield until around 1950, designing his own 1936 house at 808 S. Oak Avenue, the 1942 armory at 201 S. Oak Avenue, and the 1947 Dairyland Broadcasting building at 1710 N. Central Ave.

In 2008 the factory in Marshfield was still making boots, still employing about 200 people. In that year the factory, little changed other than the additions, was placed on the National Register of Historic Places, considered significant for its historic association with Weinbrenner Shoe Company, "one of Marshfield's largest and oldest industrial enterprises and one whose arrival in Marshfield in 1935 was of considerable historic importance to the city during the difficult times of the Depression." The factory is still used for its original purpose, and is the most intact old manufacturing building left in Marshfield. It is also "an excellent example of the kind of creative, self-funded relief projects that cities like Marshfield sponsored in the early years of the Great Depression to help their own citizens."

As of 2025, Weinbrenner is still making shoes in the 90-year-old factory, but plans to move to a new building in 2026. After that, the city plans to have a developer adapt the building into eighty units of apartments, within easy walking distance of the downtown.
