= Charles Samuel Richter House =

Historic house in Wisconsin, United States

- U.S. National Register of Historic Places
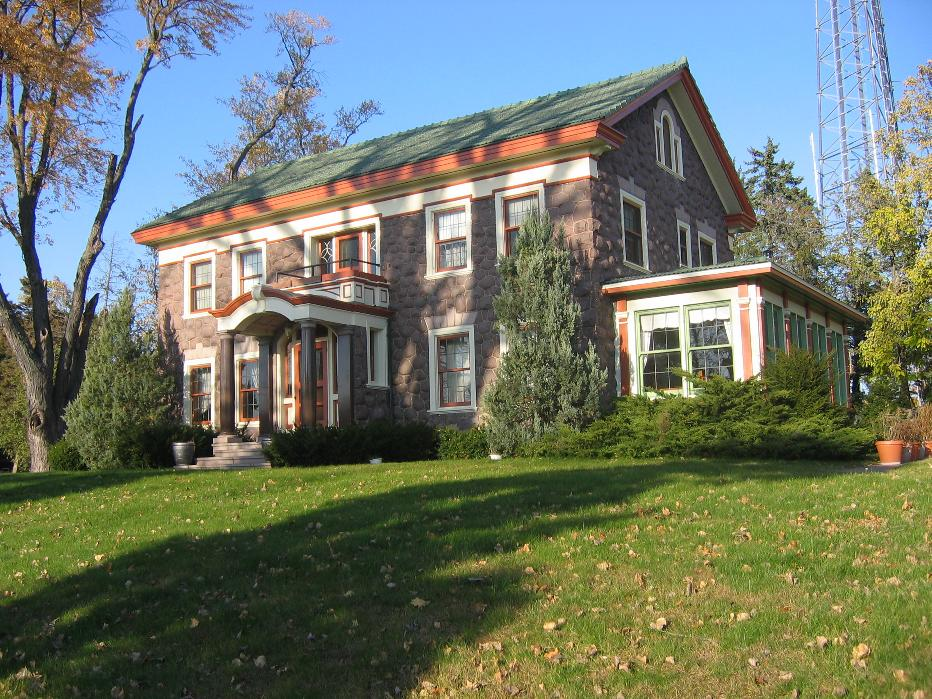
- Charles Samuel Richter House, Montello, Wisconsin, October 2008

- Location within Wisconsin Location within the United States
- Location: 55, 103, and 105 Underwood Ave., Montello, Wisconsin
- Coordinates: 43°47′36″N 89°19′49″W
- Built: 1909-1912
- Architect: Parkinson & Dockendorff
- Architectural style: Colonial Revival
- NRHP reference No.: 96000908
- Added to NRHP: August 16, 1996

The Charles Samuel Richter House is a house in Montello, Wisconsin, United States, listed on the National Register of Historic Places. The house was built by Charles Samuel Richter, the president of the Montello Granite Company. It is sited on a hill overlooking both Montello Lake and Buffalo Lake. The plans were drawn in 1908, and construction lasted three years until it was completed in 1912. The house has thick walls with granite on the exterior and cinderblock in the middle. The two round pillars around the front entrance are solid granite, and required six months of mechanical polishing to make them perfect. The interior has hardwood floors, 54 leaded glass windows, stained glass above the bookcases on either side of the fireplace, and a curved open stairway in the foyer. At the time it was built, it was billed as the only granite house in the world.

It was designed by architects Parkinson & Dockendorff.
