= Waupaca Free Public Library =

- U.S. National Register of Historic Places
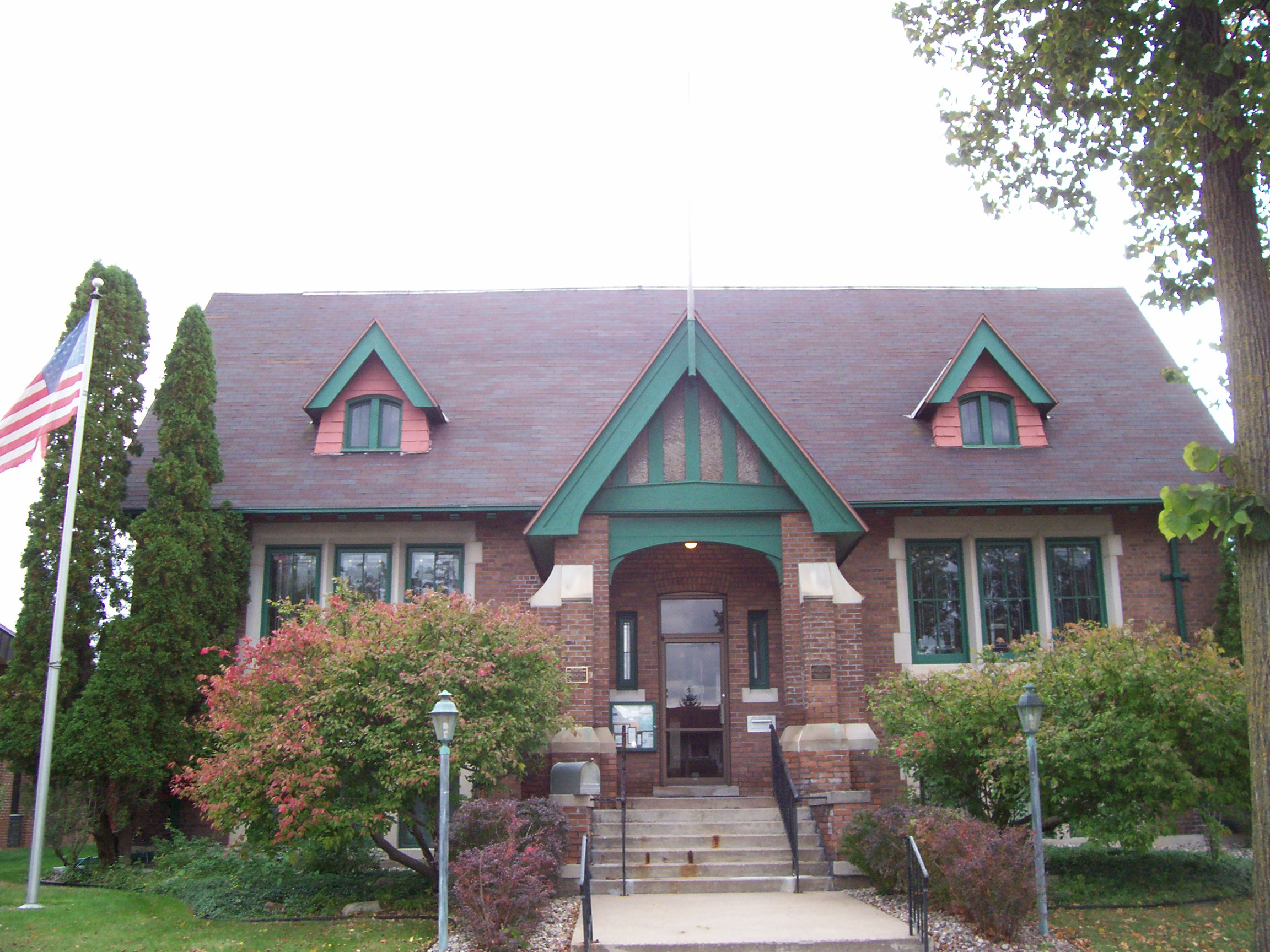

- Location within Wisconsin Location within the United States
- Location: 321 S. Main St., Waupaca, Wisconsin
- Coordinates: 44°21′19″N 89°5′5″W
- Area: less than one acre
- Built: 1914
- Architect: Parkinson and Dockendorff; Starmont, James
- Architectural style: English Tudor Revival/Arts and Crafts
- MPS: Public Library Facilities of Wisconsin MPS
- NRHP reference No.: 96000732
- Added to NRHP: June 28, 1996

The Waupaca Free Public Library is a historic Carnegie library located on Main Street in Waupaca, Wisconsin, United States. It was built from 1913 to 1914 and designed by architects Parkinson and Dockendorff from La Crosse, Wisconsin. The design combines elements of English Tudor Revival and American Arts and Crafts architectural styles. The construction was funded with a grant from the Carnegie Corporation. It was listed on the National Register of Historic Places in 1996.
