= National Register of Historic Places listings in Wisconsin =

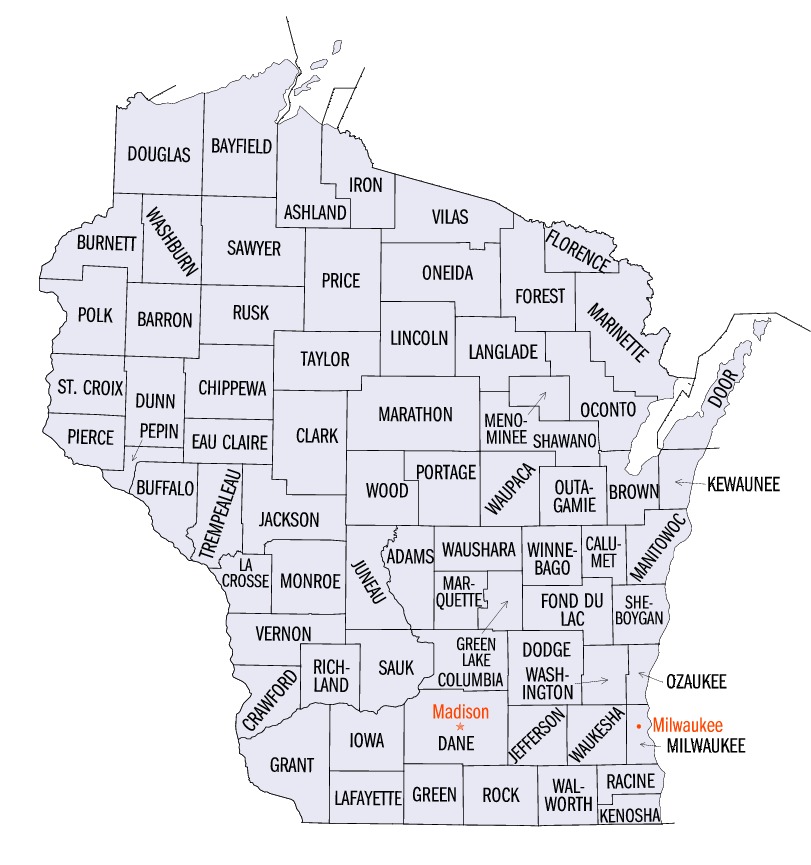
Wisconsin counties

This is a list of properties and districts listed on the National Register of Historic Places in Wisconsin. There are over 2,500 listed sites in Wisconsin. Each of the state's 72 counties has at least one listing on the National Register.

This National Park Service list is complete through NPS recent listings posted October 23, 2026.

Contents: Counties in Wisconsin (links in italic lead to a new page)
Adams - Ashland - Barron - Bayfield - Brown - Buffalo - Burnett - Calumet - Chippewa - Clark - Columbia - Crawford - Dane - Dodge - Door - Douglas - Dunn - Eau Claire - Florence - Fond du Lac - Forest - Grant - Green - Green Lake - Iowa - Iron - Jackson - Jefferson - Juneau - Kenosha - Kewaunee - La Crosse - Lafayette - Langlade - Lincoln - Manitowoc - Marathon - Marinette - Marquette - Menominee - Milwaukee - Monroe - Oconto - Oneida - Outagamie - Ozaukee - Pepin - Pierce - Polk - Portage - Price - Racine - Richland - Rock - Rusk - Sauk - Sawyer - Shawano - Sheboygan - St. Croix - Taylor - Trempealeau - Vernon - Vilas - Walworth - Washburn - Washington - Waukesha - Waupaca - Waushara - Winnebago - Wood

== Numbers of properties and districts ==
There are approximately 2,300 properties and districts listed on the National Register of Historic Places in Wisconsin. The numbers of properties and districts in the state or in any of its 72 counties are not directly reported by the National Register. Following are approximate tallies of current listings from lists of the specific properties and districts.

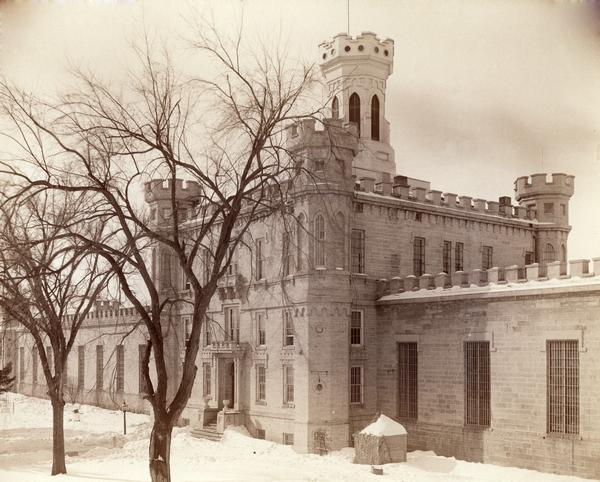
Wisconsin State Prison Historic District, Waupun, Dodge County

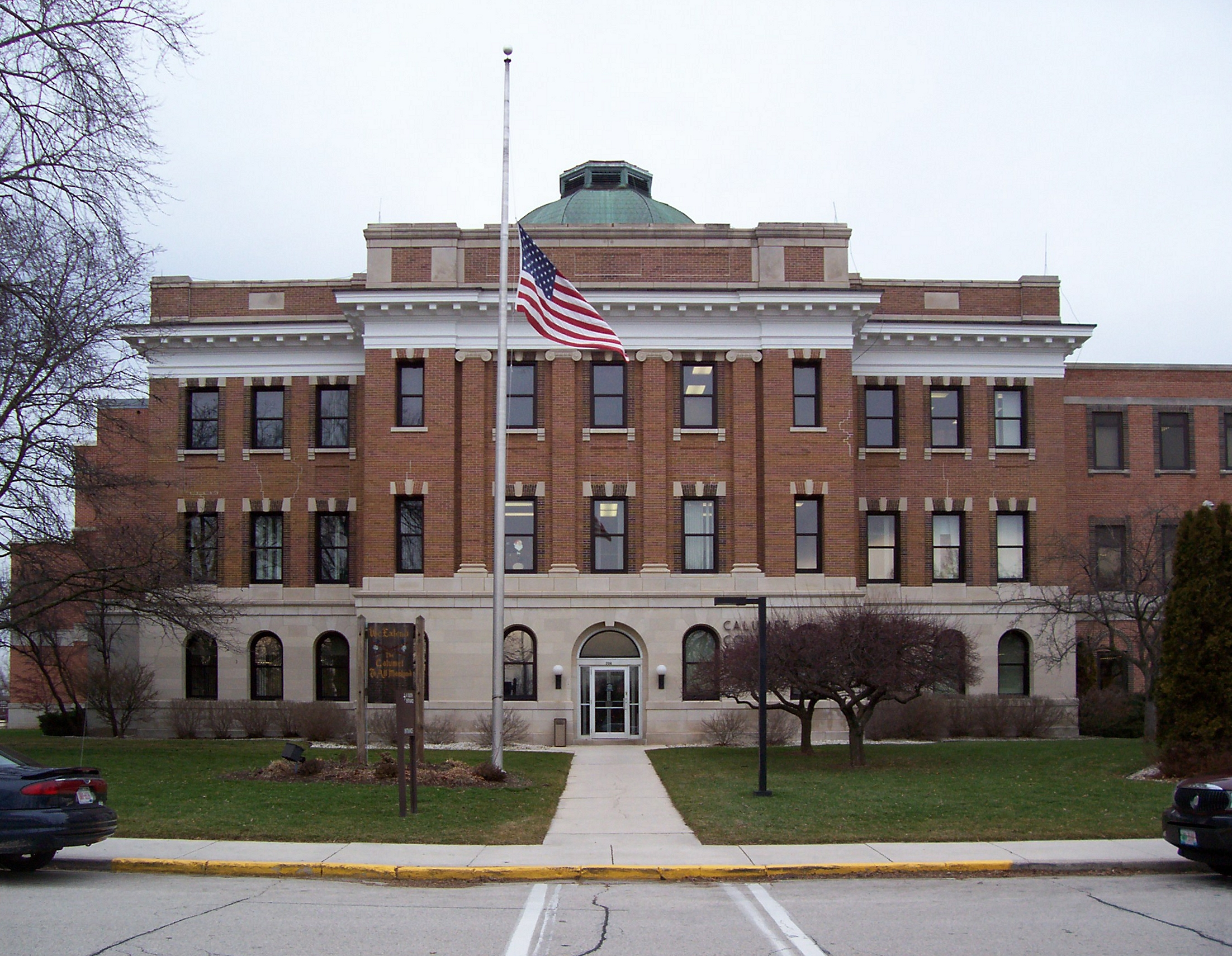
Calumet County Courthouse

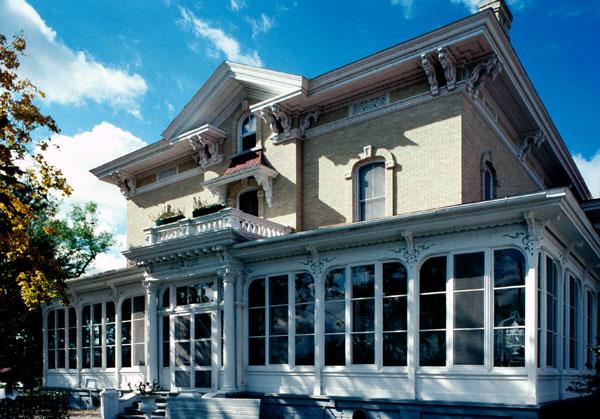
Villa Louis, Prairie du Chien, Crawford County

	County	# of Sites
1	Adams	3
2	Ashland	42
3	Barron	10
4	Bayfield	26
5	Brown	64
6	Buffalo	13
7	Burnett	9
8	Calumet	11
9	Chippewa	13
10	Clark	21
11	Columbia	56
12	Crawford	29
13.1	Dane: Madison	158
13.2	Dane: Other	107
13.3	Dane: Total	265
14	Dodge	40
15	Door	82
16	Douglas	21
17	Dunn	8
18	Eau Claire	65
19	Florence	7
20	Fond du Lac	53
21	Forest	11
22	Grant	40
23	Green	31
24	Green Lake	17
25	Iowa	41
26	Iron	5
27	Jackson	9
28	Jefferson	60
29	Juneau	9
30	Kenosha	29
31	Kewaunee	17
32	La Crosse	73
33	Lafayette	13
34	Langlade	6
35	Lincoln	6
36	Manitowoc	40
37	Marathon	34
38	Marinette	14
39	Marquette	7
40	Menominee	1
41.1	Milwaukee: Milwaukee (city)	219
41.2	Milwaukee: Other	74
41.3	Milwaukee: Total	293
42	Monroe	14
43	Oconto	26
44	Oneida	25
45	Outagamie	52
46	Ozaukee	42
47	Pepin	2
48	Pierce	11
49	Polk	14
50	Portage	22
51	Price	13
52	Racine	59
53	Richland	15
54	Rock	142
55	Rusk	3
56	St. Croix	36
57	Sauk	62
58	Sawyer	4
59	Shawano	6
60	Sheboygan	64
61	Taylor	8
62	Trempealeau	18
63	Vernon	24
64	Vilas	19
65	Walworth	52
66	Washburn	3
67	Washington	31
68	Waukesha	157
69	Waupaca	27
70	Waushara	3
71	Winnebago	93
72	Wood	22
(duplicates)		(4)
Total:		2,659

== See also ==
- National Historic Preservation Act of 1966
- List of National Historic Landmarks in Wisconsin
- United States National Register of Historic Places listings
- List of bridges on the National Register of Historic Places in Wisconsin
- List of the oldest buildings in Wisconsin
- List of historical societies in Wisconsin
