= Sacred Heart Catholic Church (Heron Lake, Minnesota) =

Historic church in Minnesota, United States

- Church of the Sacred Heart (Catholic)
- U.S. National Register of Historic Places
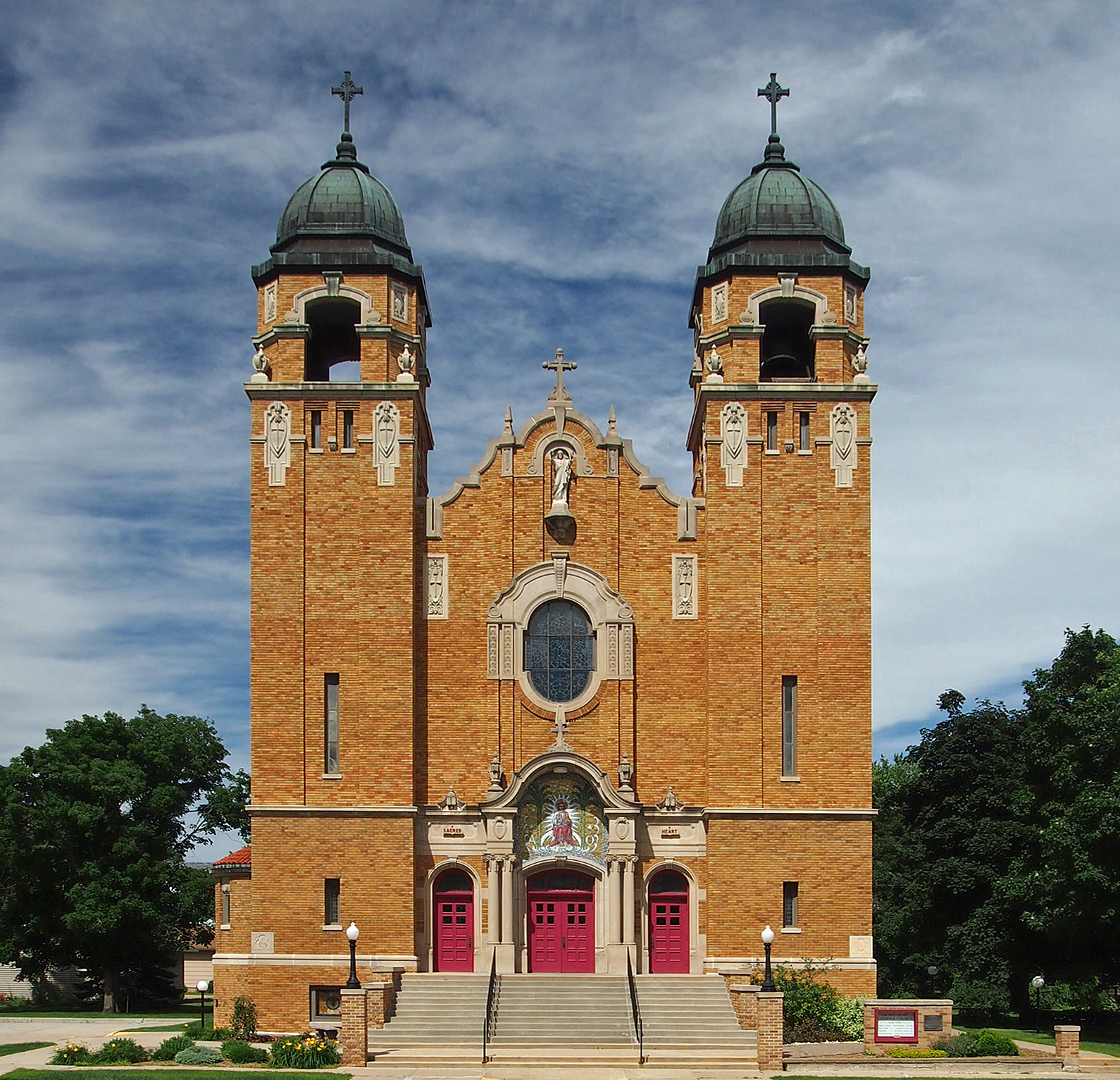
- Church of the Sacred Heart from the southwest

- Location within Minnesota Location within the United States
- Location: 9th St. and 4th Ave., Heron Lake, Minnesota
- Coordinates: 43°47′41″N 95°19′2″W
- Area: less than one acre
- Built: 1921
- Architect: A. Parkinson & B. Dockendorff
- Architectural style: Neo-Baroque
- NRHP reference No.: 89000157
- Added to NRHP: March 20, 1989

The Sacred Heart Catholic Church is a Roman Catholic church in Heron Lake, Minnesota, United States. It is part of the Diocese of Winona–Rochester. Built in 1921 at a cost of $150,000, the church was designed by architects Parkinson & Dockendorff of La Crosse, Wisconsin. The design is Neo-Baroque with neoclassical touches. It was modeled after Central European churches and based on a basilica plan with prominent twin bell towers. It was dedicated in August 1921 in a ceremony officiated by Bishop Patrick R. Heffron of the Diocese of Winona. The church was listed on the National Register of Historic Places in 1989.
