= Lincoln School (Shawano, Wisconsin) =

- U.S. National Register of Historic Places
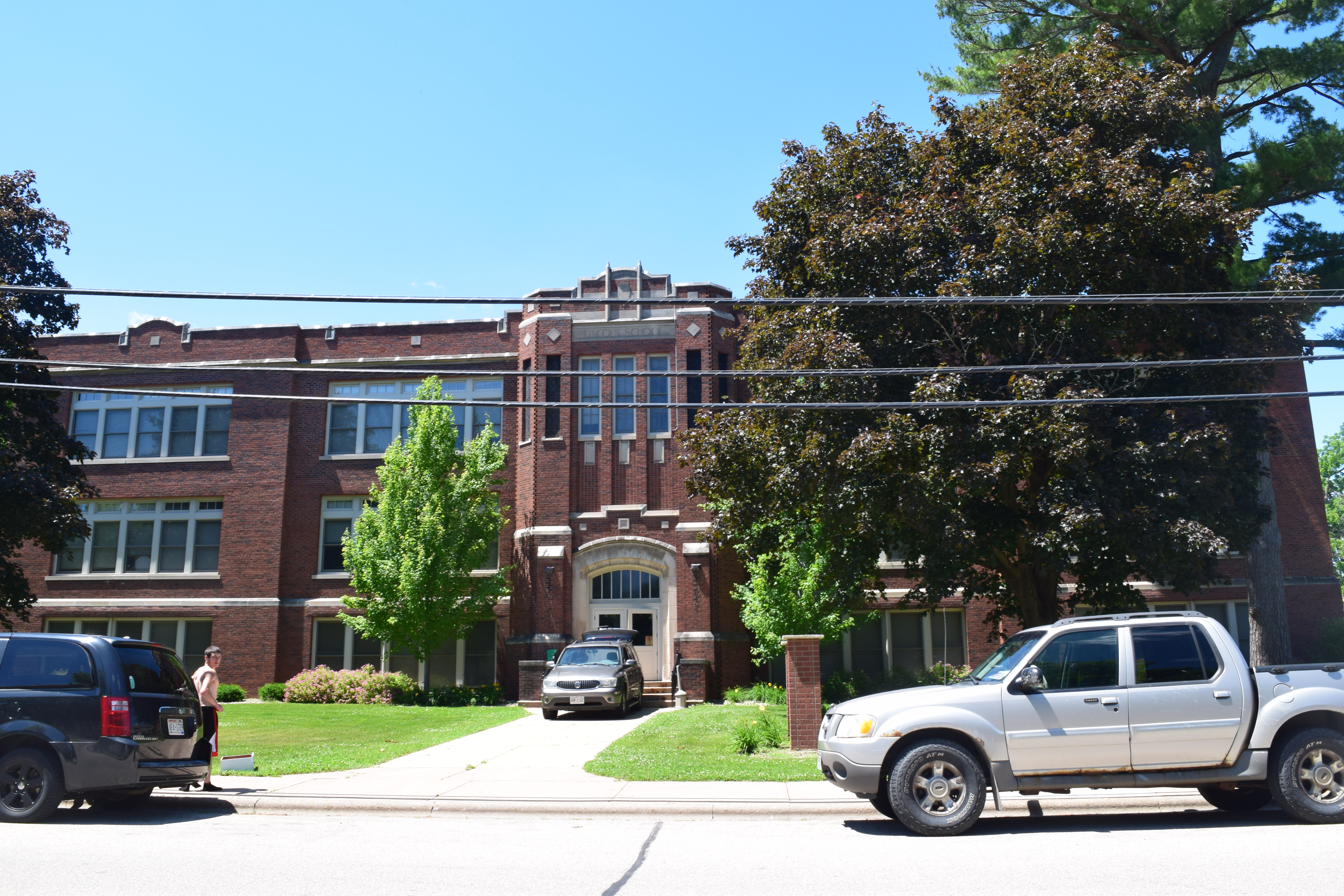

- Location within Wisconsin
- Location: 237 S. Sawyer St. Shawano, Wisconsin
- Coordinates: 44°46′44″N 88°36′28″W
- Built: 1924-1925
- Architect: Parkinson & Dockendorff
- Architectural style: Collegiate Gothic
- NRHP reference No.: 13000865
- Added to NRHP: November 7, 2013

The Lincoln School is located in Shawano, Wisconsin.

== Description ==
The school houses classes for grades from kindergarten through 8th grade. It was built to replace a previous school that had been destroyed after a fire. The school's design was advanced for the time, featuring showers, a fireplace, manual training and domestic sciences rooms, and a dental office.
