= National Register of Historic Places listings in Jackson County, Wisconsin =

Location of Jackson County in Wisconsin

This is a list of the National Register of Historic Places listings in Jackson County, Wisconsin. It is intended to provide a comprehensive listing of entries in the National Register of Historic Places that are located in Jackson County, Wisconsin. The locations of National Register properties for which the latitude and longitude coordinates are included below may be seen in a map.

There are 9 properties and districts listed on the National Register in the county.

This National Park Service list is complete through NPS recent listings posted February 6, 2026.

== Current listings ==
	Name on the Register	Image	Date listed	Location	City or town	Description
1	Black Hawk Powwow Grounds	Black Hawk Powwow Grounds	March 28, 2007 (#07000244)	W8426 WI 54E; 44°20′07″N 90°44′18″W	Komensky	Ho-Chunk ceremonial center since at least 1884, where the people gather for ceremonial dances, meetings, and socializing.
2	Black River Falls Commercial Historic District	Black River Falls Commercial Historic District	August 9, 2021 (#100006789)	Generally bounded by Harrison, North Water, Fillmore, and North 3rd Sts. 44°17′42″N 90°50′56″W	Black River Falls	Remnants of the old downtown which was rebuilt in the years after the flood disaster of 1911, including stores and shops in various architectural styles.
3	Black River Falls Public Library	Black River Falls Public Library	December 27, 2007 (#07001330)	321 Main St. 44°17′43″N 90°51′05″W	Black River Falls	1914 Carnegie library designed by Henry Ottenheimer with Prairie School influences. Now a museum of the Jackson County Historical Society.
4	Gullickson's Glen	Gullickson's Glen	December 21, 1978 (#78000102)	Address Restricted	Irving	Rock shelter with petroglyphs.
5	Franklin E. and Eva E. Keefe House	Franklin E. and Eva E. Keefe House	February 2, 2023 (#100008607)	221 North 3rd St. 44°17′55″N 90°51′03″W	Black River Falls	Grand 1910 house designed by James McGillivray in a transitional style, with the bay windows, the tall chimney, and various surface textures of Queen Anne style mixed with symmetry, columns and pediments from Colonial Revival style.
6	Millston Union Church	Millston Union Church	September 12, 2022 (#100008109)	W6647 Berry St. 44°11′30″N 90°38′48″W	Millston	Red brick Gothic Revival-style church built in 1904 by locals supervised by Edward Mill.
7	Silver Mound Archeological District	Silver Mound Archeological District	January 17, 1975 (#75000067)	Western side of Highway 95 south of Schroeder Rd at KOA campground. 44°25′36″N 90°57′35″W	Alma Center	Bluff where Paleo-Indians quarried quartzite for tools shortly after the last glacier receded. This Hixton orthoquartzite is distinctive, so the distribution of the tools gives clues about very early travel and commerce.
8	Spring Creek School	Spring Creek School	September 5, 2024 (#100010817)	N5311 Moss Hill Road; 44°15′48″N 90°53′34″W	Albion	Intact one-room school built in 1885, typical of that period, with one classroom and small kitchen and library. Served as a school until 1962; as a museum since then.
9	Union High School	Union High School	January 20, 1978 (#78000103)	N. 3rd St.223 N. Fourth St. 44°17′51″N 90°51′05″W	Black River Falls	3-story brick school with tower designed by W.H.J. Nichols in Second Empire style and built in 1871. Served as high school until 1897, then elementary school, and now elderly housing.

== See also ==
- List of National Historic Landmarks in Wisconsin
- National Register of Historic Places listings in Wisconsin
- Listings in neighboring counties: Clark, Eau Claire, Juneau, La Crosse, Monroe, Trempealeau, Wood
