= Sparta Masonic Temple =

- U.S. National Register of Historic Places
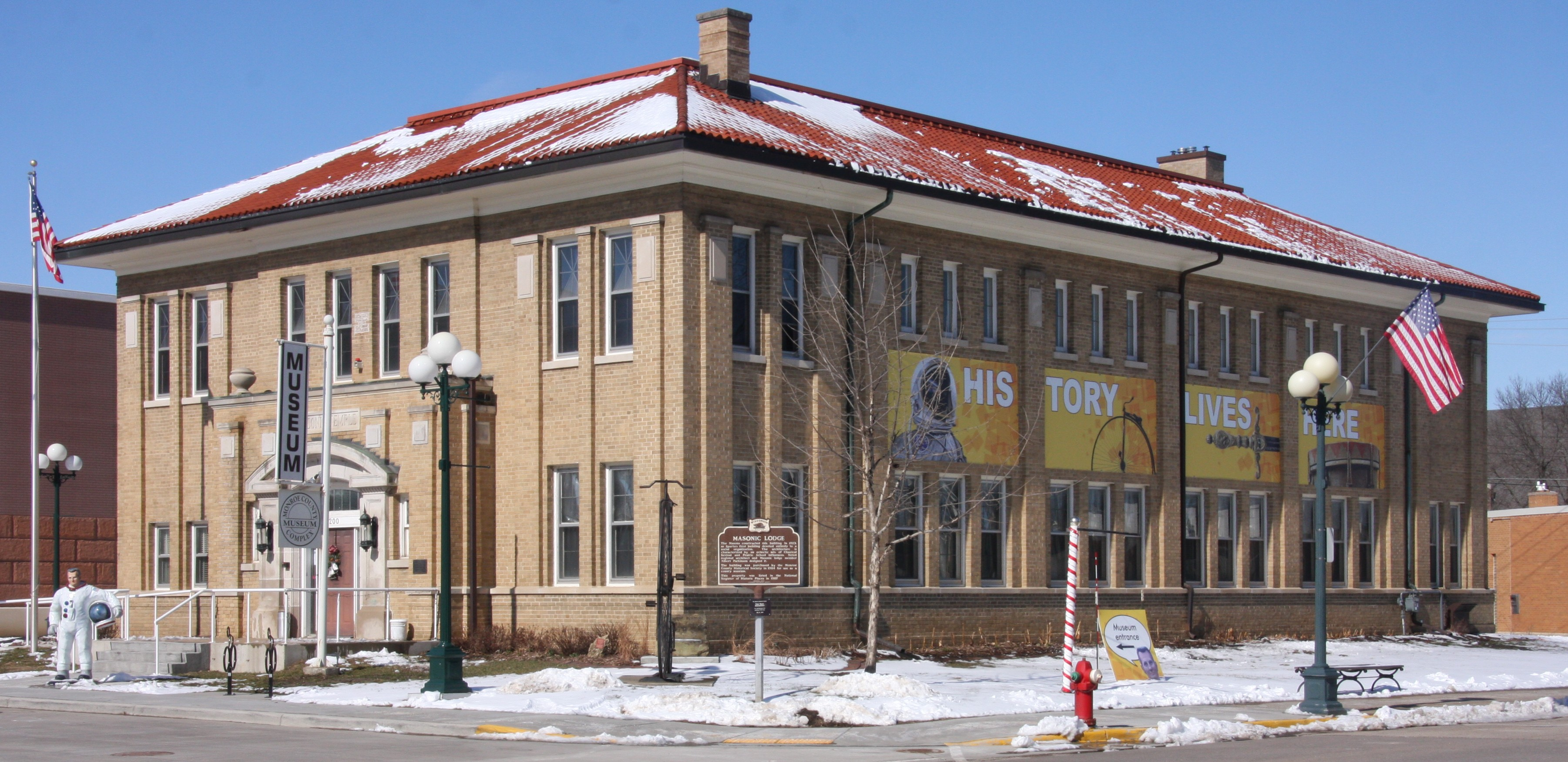
- Monroe County Museum (historic Masonic Temple) at the intersection of Court and Main Streets in Sparta, Wisconsin.

- Location within Wisconsin Location within the United States
- Location: 200 West Main Street, Sparta, Wisconsin
- Coordinates: 43°56′41″N 90°48′45″W
- Area: less than one acre
- Built: 1923
- Built by: Naset Brothers
- Architect: Parkinson & Dockendorff
- Architectural style: Classical Revival, Prairie School
- NRHP reference No.: 87001734
- Added to NRHP: September 25, 1987

The Monroe County Museum is a historic building located in Sparta, Wisconsin. It was constructed in 1923 as a meeting hall for a local Masonic Lodge, and was listed on the National Register of Historic Places in 1987 under the historic name "Sparta Masonic Temple".

An order of Masons was organized in Sparta in 1854. Meetings were held in homes until 1891, when a Masonic Temple was constructed at the corner of Main and Water Streets. By 1919 the various lodges that shared the building had outgrown it, so they bought land and constructed the new building, which is the subject of this article.

Sparta's new Masonic Temple was completed in 1923, with construction delayed because of the steel shortage due to WWI. The building was designed by Parkinson & Dockendorff of La Crosse, combining the proportions of Classical Revival style with the low-pitched hip roof and wide eaves of Prairie Style. The framework is reinforced concrete and steel, clad in cream brick. Two-story pilasters are formed from that brick. The roof is covered in red tile. The Sparta Herald gave a nice description of the inside when it opened in 1923:

"Entering the marble wainscoted vestibule you come to the main hallway at the end of which a pair of French doors open into the dining room. On the right, as you enter, is the ladies reception room; next is what the lodge boys call their living room, all richly and substantially furnished in big comfortable leather davenports and easy chairs with a generous fire place at one end, and French doors opening into the dining room at the other; the woodwork is all oak, stained dark. .....On the left of the entrance hall is a large cloak room for men; next, a door opens into a well-lighted, pleasant card and reception room with tables and chairs done in Indian gray, where members can smoke, play cards, and visit.

The big dining room with its polished maple floor is designed for serving refreshments and banquets and for dancing parties and socials. A stage on one side is provided for musicians. The kitchen has ample cupboards, a pantry, and plenty of shelves and drawers to hold all dishes and supplies. It has a hotel range and an electric range, together with an electric percolator for coffee. The room is well lighted and pleasant."

In 1987 the building was bought by the Monroe County Historical Society. The museum's exhibits include Monroe County people, pioneer history, agriculture, military history, industry, business, and the home.
