= Albert and Theresa Marx House =

Historic house in Wisconsin, United States

- U.S. National Register of Historic Places
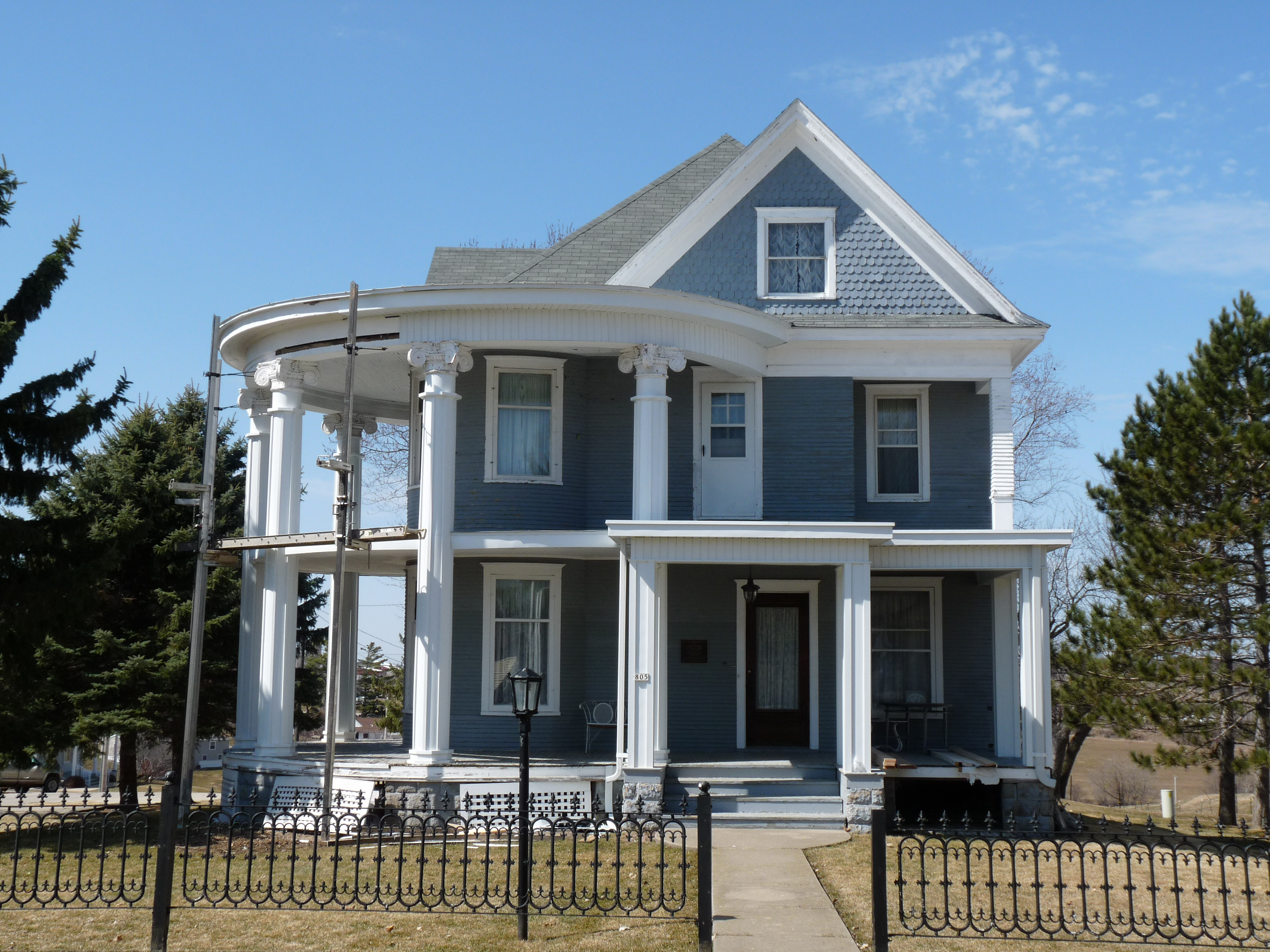

- Location within Wisconsin Location within the United States
- Location: 805 Cashton Ave., Cashton, Wisconsin
- Coordinates: 43°44′37″N 90°46′54″W
- Built: 1906
- Architectural style: Queen Anne/Classical Revival
- NRHP reference No.: 07000835
- Added to NRHP: August 16, 2007

The Albert and Theresa Marx House is a historic house located in Cashton, Wisconsin. It was added to the National Register of Historic Places on August 16, 2007.

== History ==
Perhaps the defining feature of the house is its open, two-story circular veranda and adjoining entrance porch, which wraps around the southeast corner of the house, dominating the front elevation. Two-story Ionic columns support the flat roof of the 9-foot wide veranda, while square posts support the decked entrance porch that extends variously from seven to thirteen feet from the house. The house was originally built for Albert Marx and his wife, Theresa Mashak Marx. Albert had originally moved to Cashton in 1894 and married Theresa in 1901.
