= Wittich Hall =

- Physical Education Building/La Crosse State Normal School
- U.S. National Register of Historic Places

- Location within Wisconsin Location within the United States
- Location: UW-La Crosse campus off Wisconsin Highway 16, La Crosse, Wisconsin
- Coordinates: 43°48′52″N 91°13′48″W
- Area: less than one acre
- Built: 1916
- Architects: B. Dockendorff; A.E. Parkinson
- Architectural style: Collegiate Gothic
- NRHP reference No.: 85000791
- Added to NRHP: April 11, 1985

Physical Education Building/La Crosse State Normal School was the original physical education building at the La Crosse Normal School, now the University of Wisconsin–La Crosse, in La Crosse, Wisconsin. The building was constructed in 1916 and was named Wittich Hall after one of the school's physical education professors, Walter J. Wittich.

It was designed by architects Parkinson & Dockendorff.
