= St. John's Episcopal Church (Sparta, Wisconsin) =

Historic church in Wisconsin, United States

- U.S. National Register of Historic Places
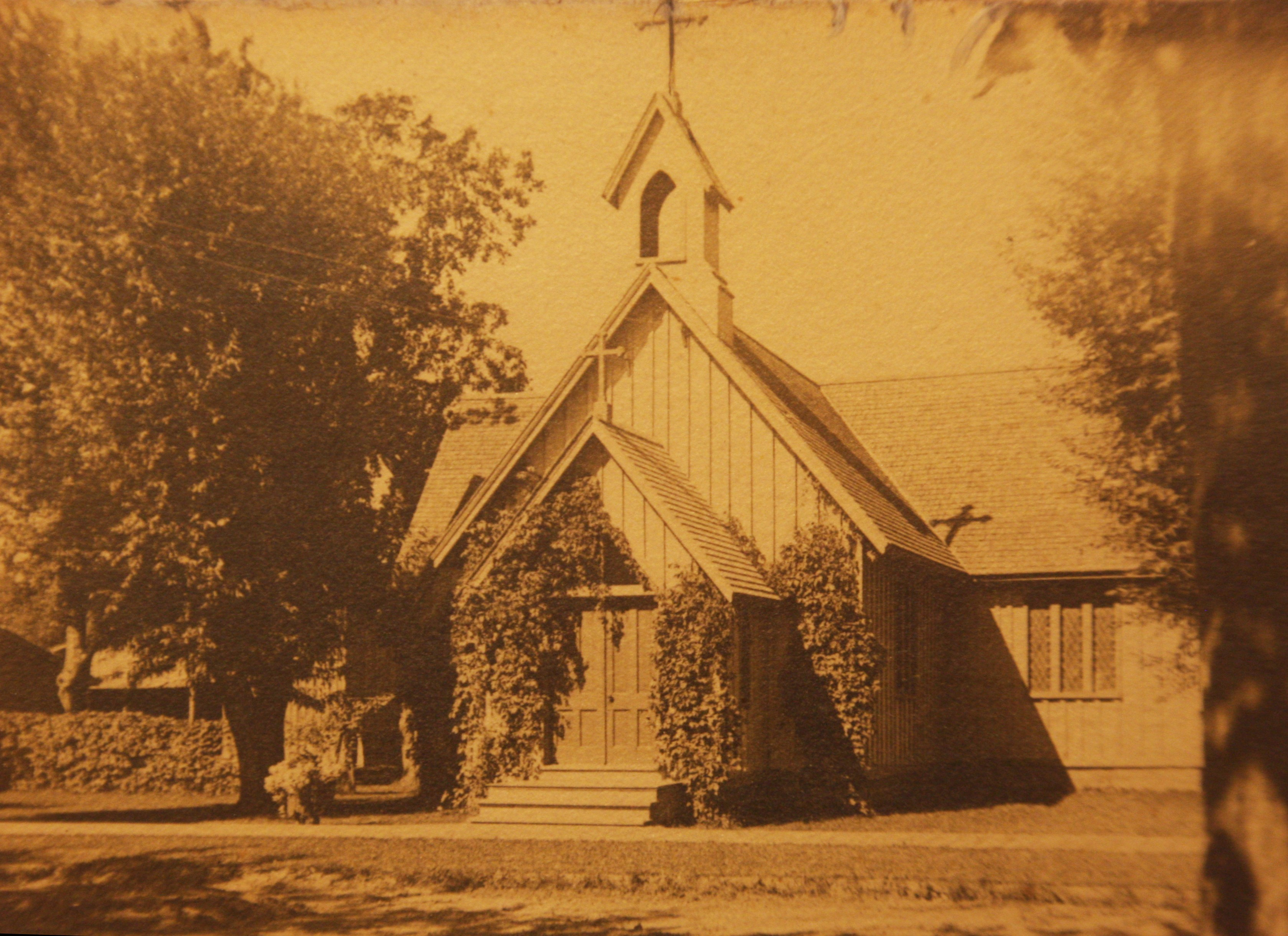
- 1890s postcard of the historic church
- Location: 400 North Water Street; Sparta, Wisconsin
- Coordinates: 43.94809°N 90.81119°W
- Built: 1863
- NRHP reference No.: 83003406
- Added to NRHP: March 18, 1983 Priest: Fr. Peter Augustine Vicar

St. John's Episcopal Church is located in Sparta, Wisconsin. It was added to the National Register of Historic Places in 1983 for its architectural significance. The church is part of the Episcopal Diocese of Eau Claire.
