= Northern Wisconsin Co-op Tobacco Pool Warehouse =

- Northern Wisconsin Co-op Tobacco Pool or Bekkedal Leaf Tobacco Warehouse
- U.S. National Register of Historic Places
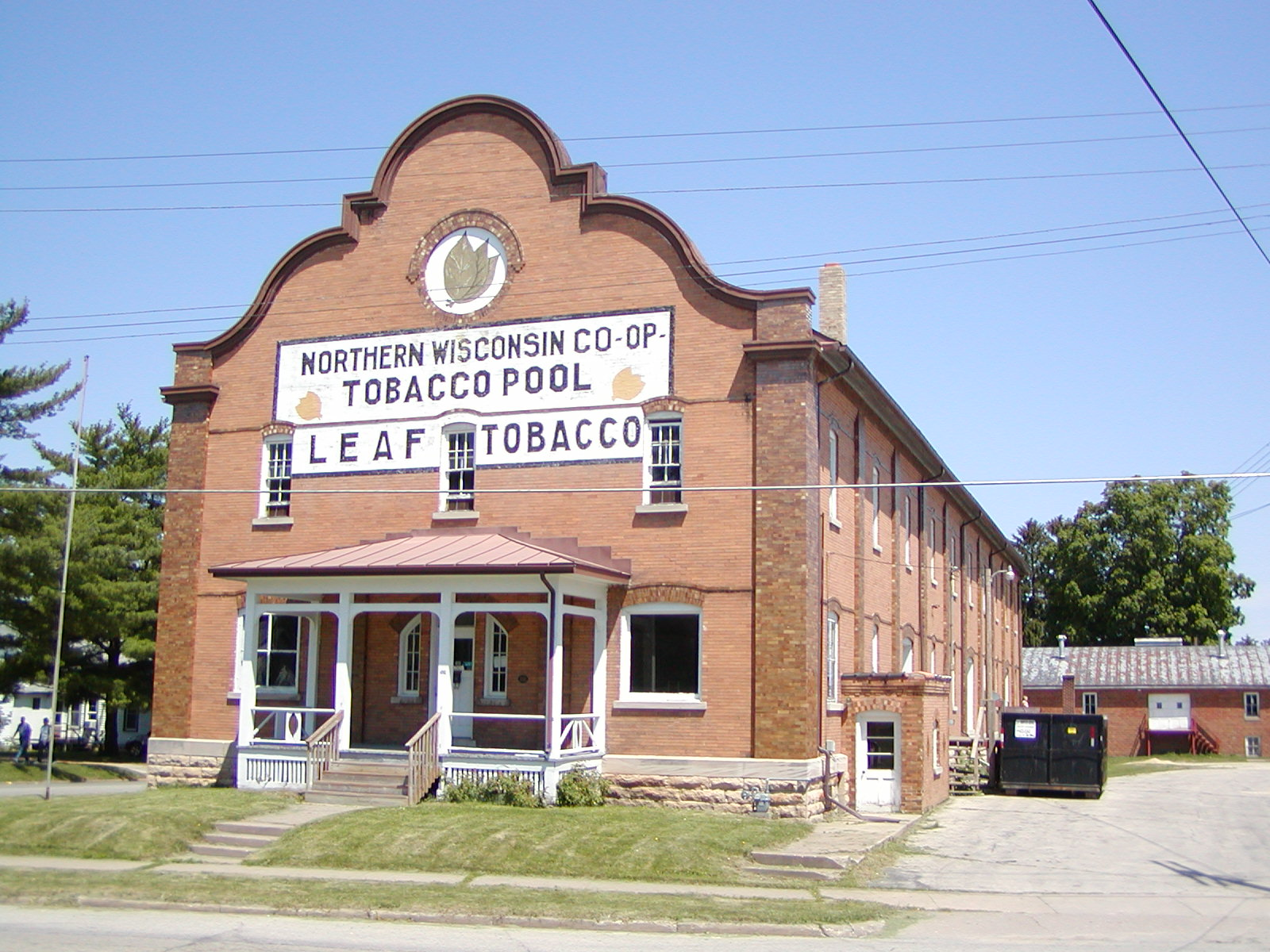
- Northern Wisconsin Co-op Tobacco Pool Warehouse
- Location: Viroqua, Wisconsin
- Coordinates: 43°33′27″N 90°53′1.5″W
- Built: 1906
- Architect: Parkinson and Dockendorff
- Architectural style: Late Victorian
- NRHP reference No.: 03001167
- Added to NRHP: November 14, 2003

The Northern Wisconsin Co-op Tobacco Pool Warehouse or Bekkedal Leaf Tobacco Warehouse is located at 504 East Decker Street Viroqua, Vernon County, Wisconsin USA. It was designed by the architects Parkinson & Dockendorff. It was added to the National Register of Historic Places on November 14, 2003.

== History ==
Tobacco farming came to Wisconsin in the 1830s from the eastern United States and was appropriated by immigrant Norwegian farmers. Being a profitable cash crop, pioneers traveling to Vernon County brought the craft with them, farming much of the Coon Valley and Westby. Martin H. Bekkedal immigrated in the 1880s and became the largest tobacco leaf wholesaler in western Wisconsin by 1900. His 1906 brick veneered hybrid post-and-beam warehouse was one of the largest tobacco warehouses in the state.

== Building features ==
The profitability in tobacco is evident in the stylish curved parapets on the north and south walls with tobacco leaf medallion decorations.

The building contains offices, a receiving room with a scale to weigh incoming tobacco, sorting and packing rooms in the basement, and "sweating" rooms where the temperature can be raised above 115 degrees to cure the tobacco.

== Grower co-op ==
When prices dropped in 1921, the nation's first tobacco marketing co-operative was formed, the Northern Wisconsin Tobacco Co-op Pool. The co-op then purchased the building from Bekkedal. By enlisting 75% of the local growers, they shut out wholesalers and were able to better control their livelihood. Their success spawned other farmer co-operatives such as in dairy farming.

The warehouse is now privately owned.
