= Masonic Temple Building (Viroqua, Wisconsin) =

- U.S. National Register of Historic Places
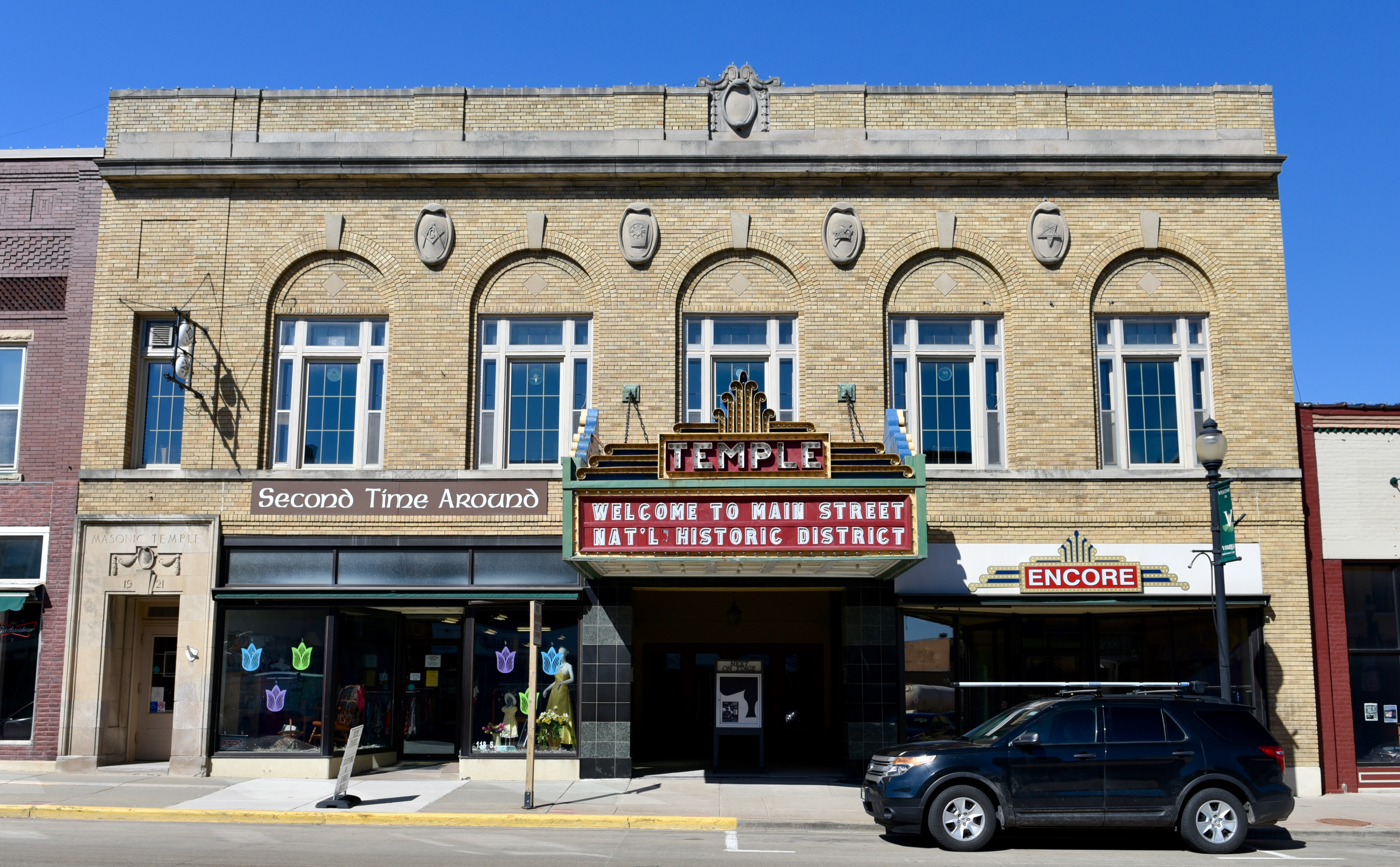
- Location exterior

- Location within Wisconsin Location within the United States
- Location: 116 S. Main St., Viroqua, Wisconsin
- Coordinates: 43°33′21″N 90°53′21″W
- Area: less than one acre
- Built: 1922
- Architect: Parkinson, A.E.; Dockendorff, Bernard, et al.
- Architectural style: Classical Revival
- NRHP reference No.: 00001469
- Added to NRHP: December 1, 2000

The Masonic Temple Building in Viroqua, Wisconsin was built in the Classical Revival style. It was designed by architects Albert E. Parkinson and Bernard Dockendorff and was listed on the National Register of Historic Places in 2000.

It is a two-story 110 by 218 feet (34 m × 66 m) building.

After the former Masonic Temple was destroyed by fire in 1920, the current structure was built to house the Masonic Temple on the second floor, and the middle part of the first level built to house the Temple Theatre. Construction on the building began in September 1921 and was completed in January 1922.

A dedication ceremony was held on August 24, 1922.
