= Tollackson Mound Group =

- U.S. National Register of Historic Places
- Nearest city: Harmony, Wisconsin
- NRHP reference No.: 97001552 and 98001464
- Added to NRHP: December 15, 1997 (original); December 15, 1998 (increase)

Tollackson Mound Group, referred to as 47VE927, is an archeological site located in the town of Harmony, in Vernon County, Wisconsin, United States, that was listed on the National Register of Historic Places in 1997 and expanded in its borders in 1998.

== History ==
The mounds were built by an Effigy Mound tribe, ancestors of the Oneota, between 500 and 1050 CE. About 950 years ago mound construction stopped, and Effigy Mound people seem to have abandoned most if not all of the interior hill country of western Wisconsin. Archaeologists have suggested that human populations in the region became too large to be supported by wild resources.

White-tailed deer may have become scarce in the open oak savannas and prairies of western Wisconsin, and the Effigy Mound people might have had too few deer to survive the winters. It is at the end of Effigy Mound time that these people begin to grow corn, suggesting that their needs were no longer met by wild resources.
