= 23rd and 24th Streets Historic District =

- U.S. National Register of Historic Places
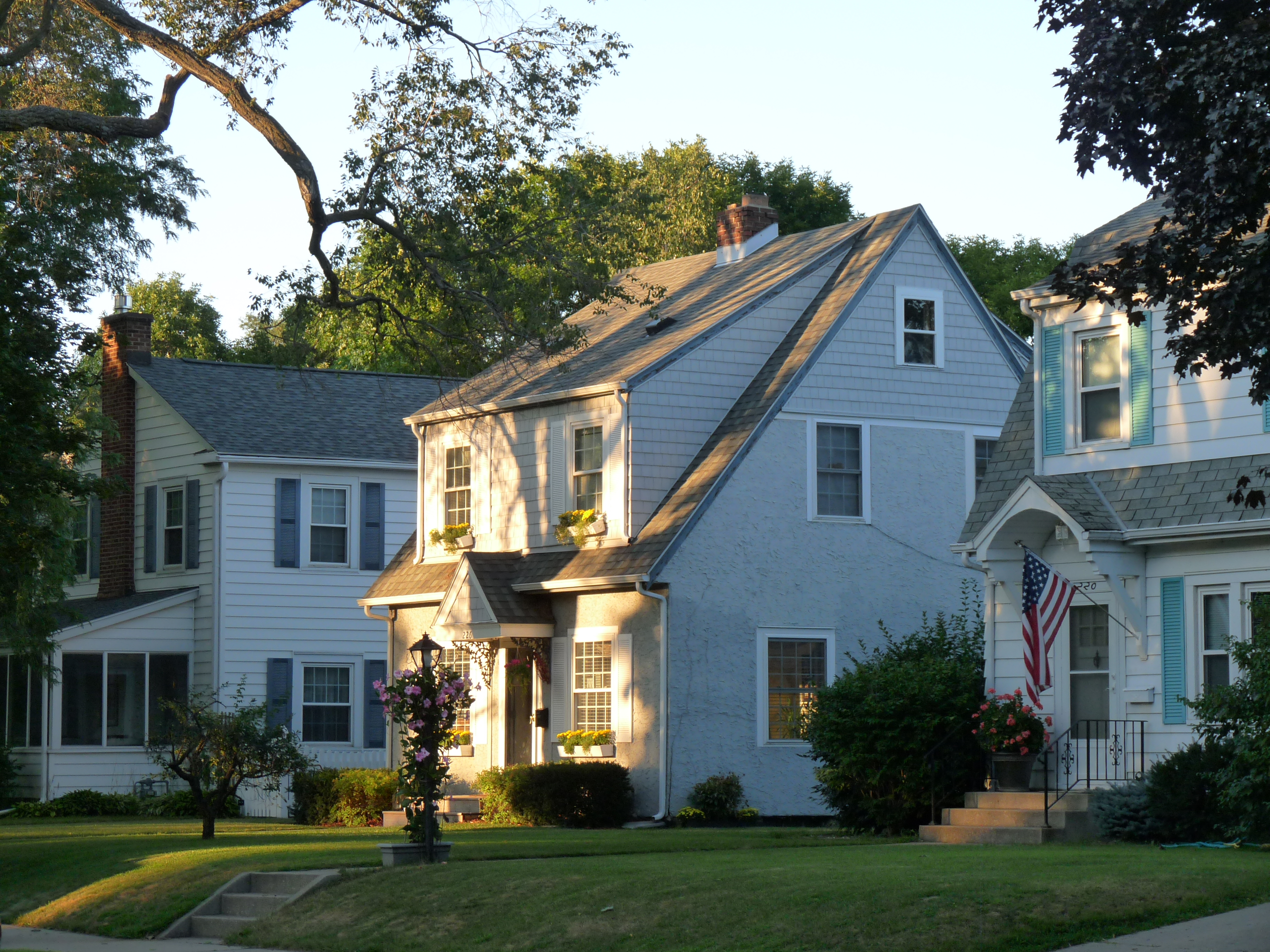

- Location within Wisconsin Location within the United States
- Location: Generally bounded by Campbell Road, Losey Blvd. North, Main Street, Vine Street, and 23rd Street North, La Crosse, Wisconsin
- Coordinates: 43°48′52″N 91°13′14″W
- NRHP reference No.: 10000839
- Added to NRHP: November 5, 2010

The 23rd and 24th Streets Historic District is located in La Crosse, Wisconsin. It was added to the National Register of Historic Places in 2010.

== History ==
Contributing buildings in the district were constructed from 1915 to 1952. Most houses were built for middle-class citizens.
