= Harmony, Vernon County, Wisconsin =

Harmony, Wisconsin
- Town
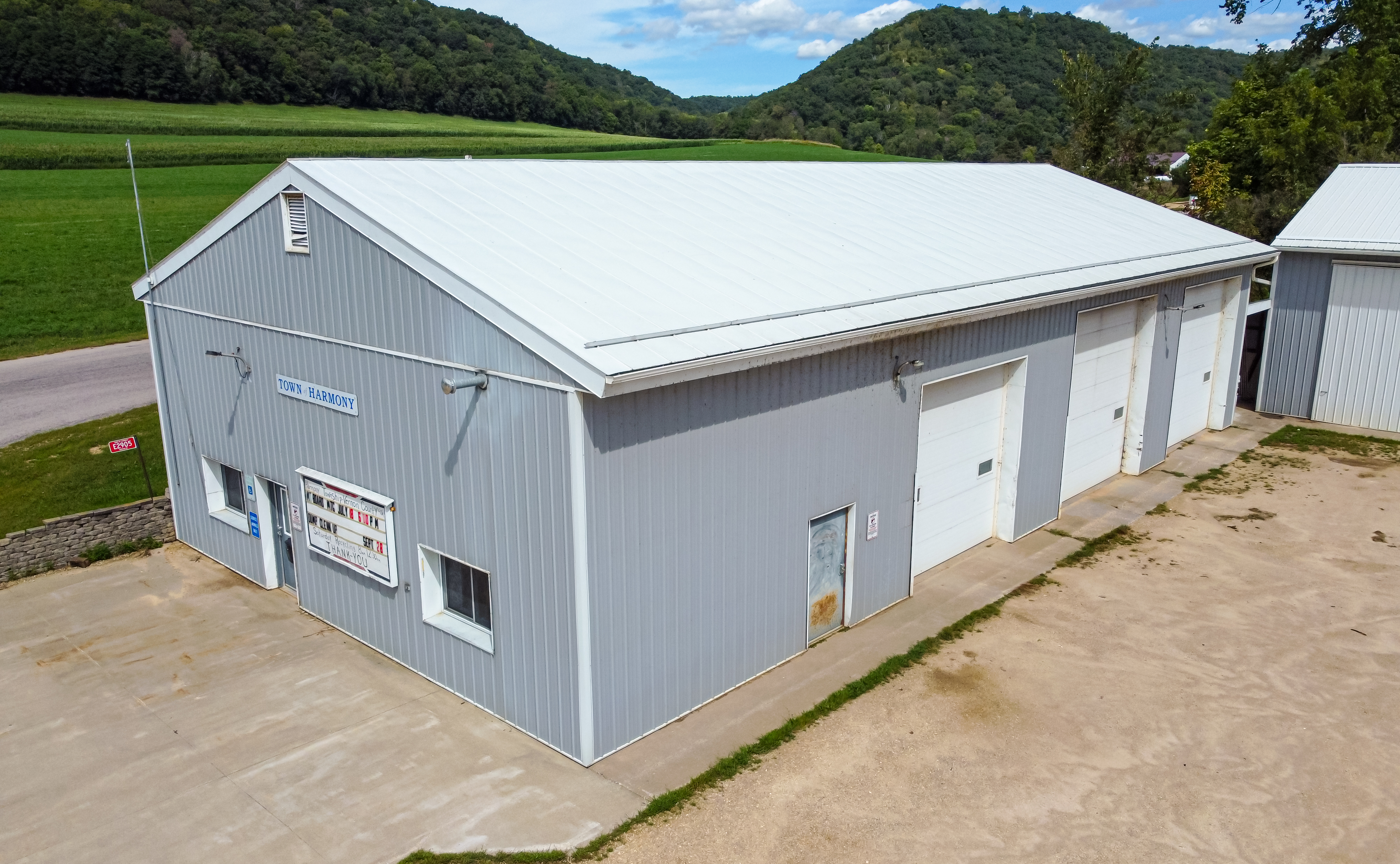
- Town hall

- Location in Vernon County and the state of Wisconsin.
- Coordinates: 43°34′43″N 91°5′30″W
- Country: United States
- State: Wisconsin
- County: Vernon

Area
  - Total: 42.9 sq mi (111.1 km^{2})
  - Land: 42.9 sq mi (111.1 km^{2})
  - Water: 0 sq mi (0.0 km^{2})
- Elevation: 745 ft (227 m)

Population (2020)
  - Total: 882
  - Density: 20.6/sq mi (7.94/km^{2})
- Time zone: UTC-6 (Central (CST))
  - Summer (DST): UTC-5 (CDT)
- Area code: 608
- FIPS code: 55-32725
- GNIS feature ID: 1583352
- Website: https://tn.harmony.wi.gov/

Harmony is a town in Vernon County, Wisconsin, United States. The population was 882 at the 2020 census. The unincorporated community of Newton is located in the town.

== Geography ==
According to the United States Census Bureau, the town has a total area of 42.9 square miles (111.1 km^{2}), all land.

== Demographics ==
As of the census of 2010, there were 755 people, 266 households, and 208 families residing in the town. The population density was 17.2 people per square mile (6.7/km^{2}). There were 308 housing units at an average density of 6.5 per square mile (2.5/km^{2}). The racial makeup of the town was 98.1% White, 0.4% Native American, 0.3% Asian, 0.5% from other races, and 1.5% from two or more races. Hispanic or Latino of any race were 1.5% of the population.

There were 266 households, out of which 32.3% had children under the age of 18 living with them, 11% had a female householder with no husband present, and 21.8% were non-families. 16.9% of all households were made up of individuals, and 6% had someone living alone who was 65 years of age or older. The average household size was 2.84 and the average family size was 3.23.

In the town, the population was spread out, with 30.9% under the age of 20, 6% from 20 to 24, 18.4% from 25 to 44, 33.7% from 45 to 64, and 11.3% who were 65 years of age or older. The median age was 40.6 years. For every 100 females, there were 100.8 males.

The median income for a household in the town was $41,000, and the median income for a family was $51,417. Males had a median income of $36,375 versus $19,167 for females. The per capita income for the town was $21,556. About 18.3% of families and 33.6% of the population were below the poverty line, including 58.6% of those under age 18 and 3.1% of those age 65 or over.

== Historical places ==
- The Tollackson Mound Group is located within the town.
