= La Crosse County School of Agriculture and Domestic Economy =

- U.S. National Register of Historic Places
- Location within Wisconsin Location within the United States
- Location: 700 Wilson Ave., Onalaska, Wisconsin
- Coordinates: 43°52′34″N 91°13′42″W
- Area: less than one acre
- Built: 1909
- Architect: Parkinson & Dockendorff
- Architectural style: Collegiate Gothic
- NRHP reference No.: 87000438
- Added to NRHP: March 13, 1987

The La Crosse County School of Agriculture and Domestic Economy was a historic structure in Onalaska, Wisconsin. It was designed by architects Parkinson & Dockendorff from La Crosse, Wisconsin. It opened in 1909 as a school offering instruction in agriculture and domestic science. The school closed in 1925. The building has also been known as the Onalaska High School Annex. It was listed on the National Register of Historic Places in 1987. The building was demolished in 1989.
