= Westby Coon-Prairie Lutheran Church =

Historic church in Wisconsin, United States

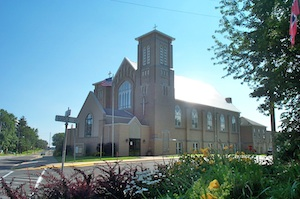
Westby Coon-Prairie Church

Westby Coon-Prairie Lutheran Church is an ELCA Lutheran church located in Westby, Wisconsin and is part of the La Crosse Area Synod. It is currently served by Pastor Alyssa Weaver. As of 2025, the congregation has 1,018 total members.

== History ==
- Norwegian Evangelic Lutheran Church and Cemetery
- U.S. National Register of Historic Places
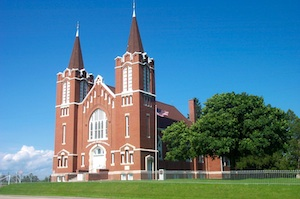
- Country Coon-Prairie Church

- Location within Wisconsin Location within the United States
- Nearest city: Westby, Wisconsin
- Area: 15 acres (6.1 ha)
- Built: 1910
- Built by: Thorson, Theodore
- Architect: Parkinson & Dockendorff
- Architectural style: Late Gothic Revival
- NRHP reference No.: 86001719
- Added to NRHP: July 14, 1986

On June 22, 1851, Rev. C. L. Clausen arrived at the settlement which would eventually become the city of Westby, Wisconsin and held services in a local barn. Two years later on July 12, 1853, Coon Prairie Lutheran Church was established by Pastor Nels Brandt and the first pastor of the congregation was Rev. H. A. Stub in 1855. The current building used by the congregation was built in 1909 in the city of Westby at a cost of $21,000, named Westby Coon-Prairie; with another building built just outside town, named Country Coon-Prairie, on the original site of the congregation's first church. Both buildings are used by the congregation for worship services with the Country Coon-Prairie building used only during the summertime. The Country Coon-Prairie site was added to the National Register of Historic Places in 1986.

The Norwegian Evangelic Lutheran Church and Cemetery, also known as Country Coon Prairie Church and Coon Prairie Cemetery, was built in 1910. It was designed by architects Parkinson & Dockendorff in Late Gothic Revival architecture. It was listed on the National Register of Historic Places in 1986.
