= Willard D. Purdy Junior High and Vocational School =

- U.S. National Register of Historic Places
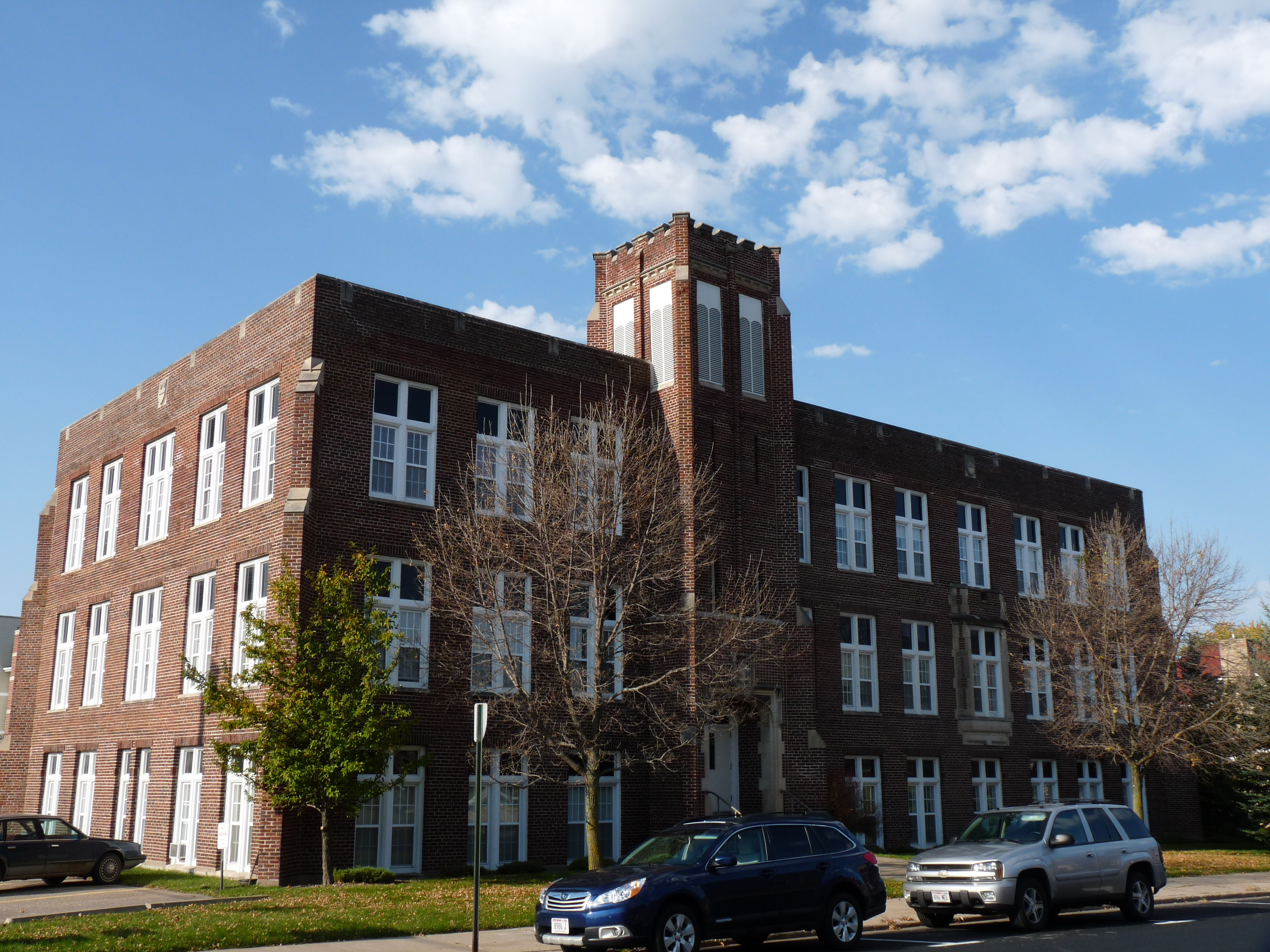
- William D. Purdy Junio High, October 2010

- Location within Wisconsin Location within the United States
- Location: 110 W. Third St., Marshfield, Wisconsin
- Coordinates: 44°39′54″N 90°10′35″W
- Area: 2 acres (0.81 ha)
- Built: 1919
- Architect: Childs & Smith (1919); Parkinson & Dockendorff (1926)
- Architectural style: Late Gothic Revival
- NRHP reference No.: 92001188
- Added to NRHP: September 8, 1992

The Willard D. Purdy Junior High and Vocational School, also known as Purdy School, is a historic school building located on Third Street in Marshfield, Wisconsin, United States. Built in 1919, it was the first junior high school in Marshfield. It was named after a local soldier who died in World War I. The building was designed in the Collegiate Gothic style by Childs & Smith from Chicago. A substantial addition to the school in 1926 increased the size by more than three-fold and was designed by architects Parkinson & Dockendorff from La Crosse, Wisconsin. The building was listed on the National Register of Historic Places in 1992.
