= Parkinson & Dockendorff =

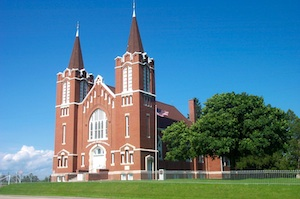
Norwegian Evangelic Lutheran Church in Westby

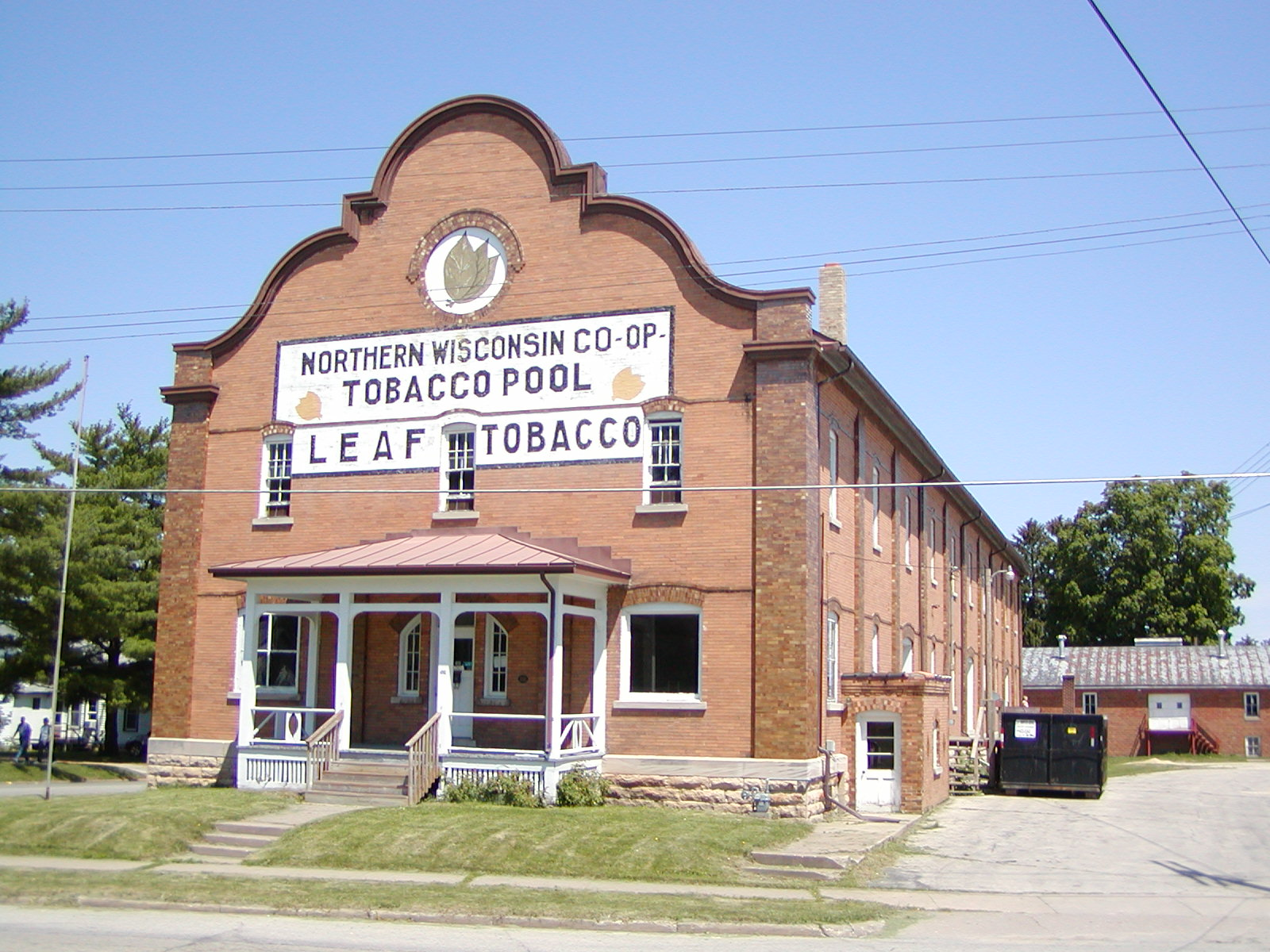
Bekkedal Leaf Tobacco Warehouse in Viroqua

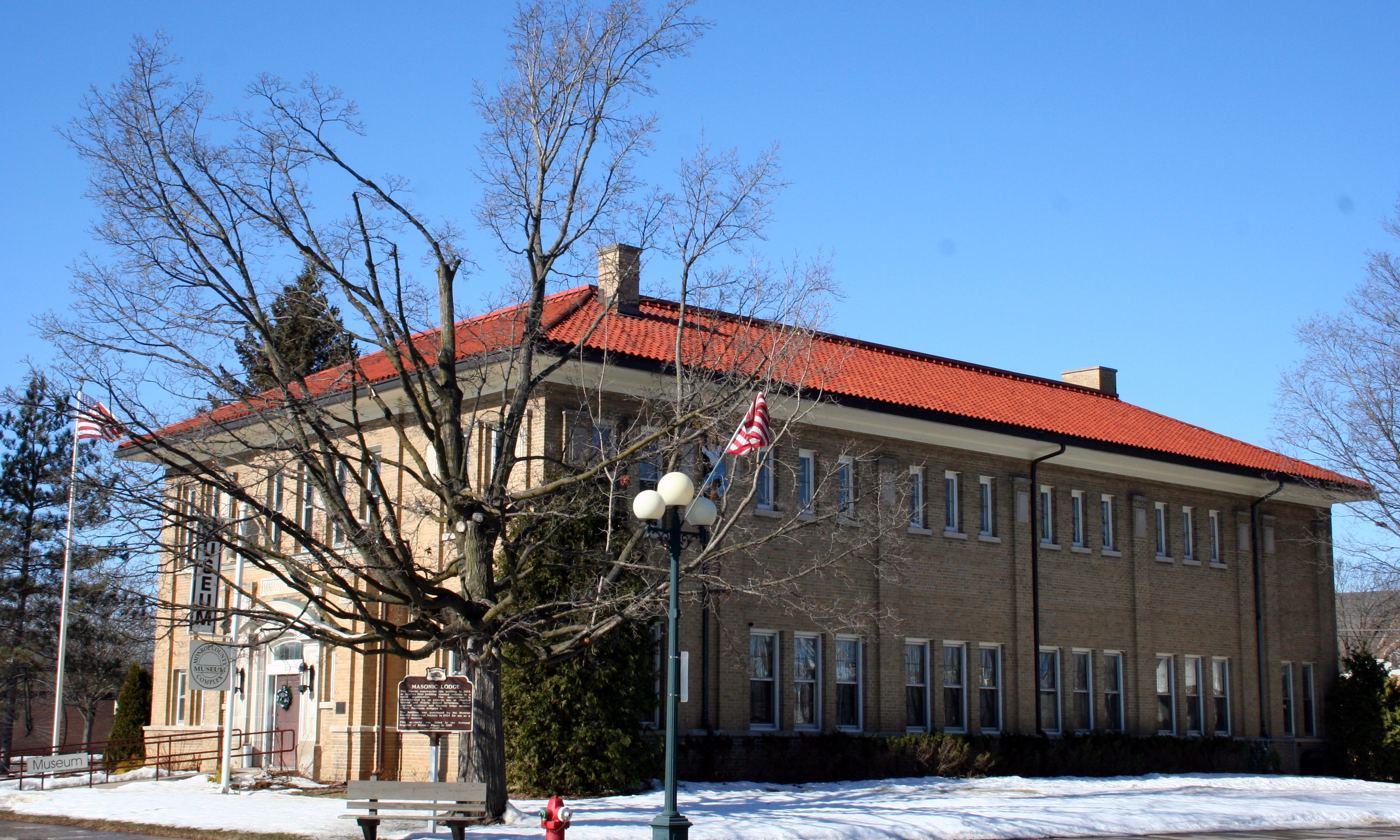
Sparta Masonic Temple

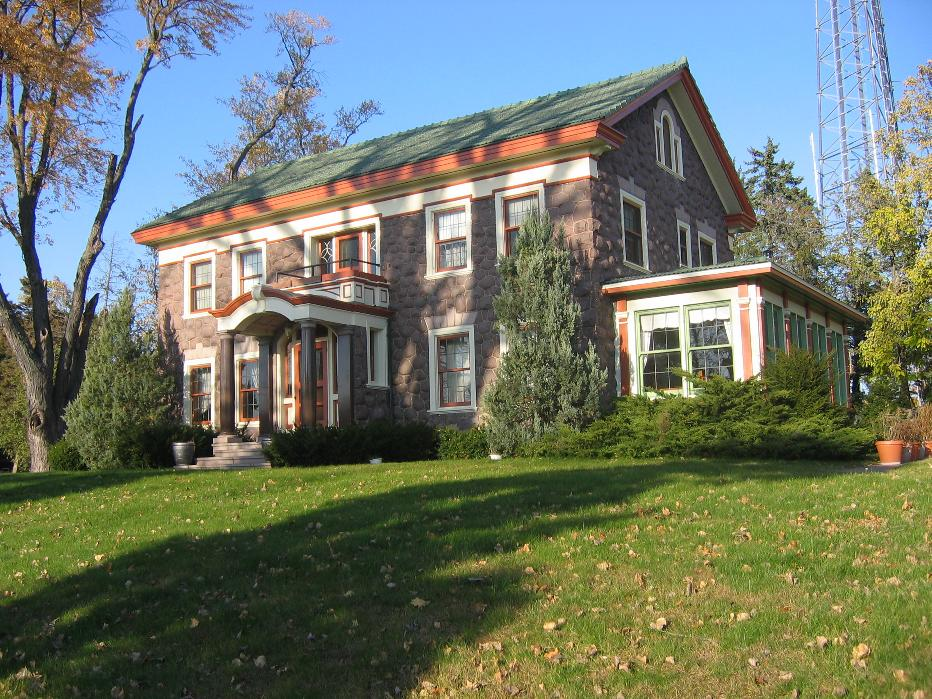
Charles Samuel Richter House in Montello

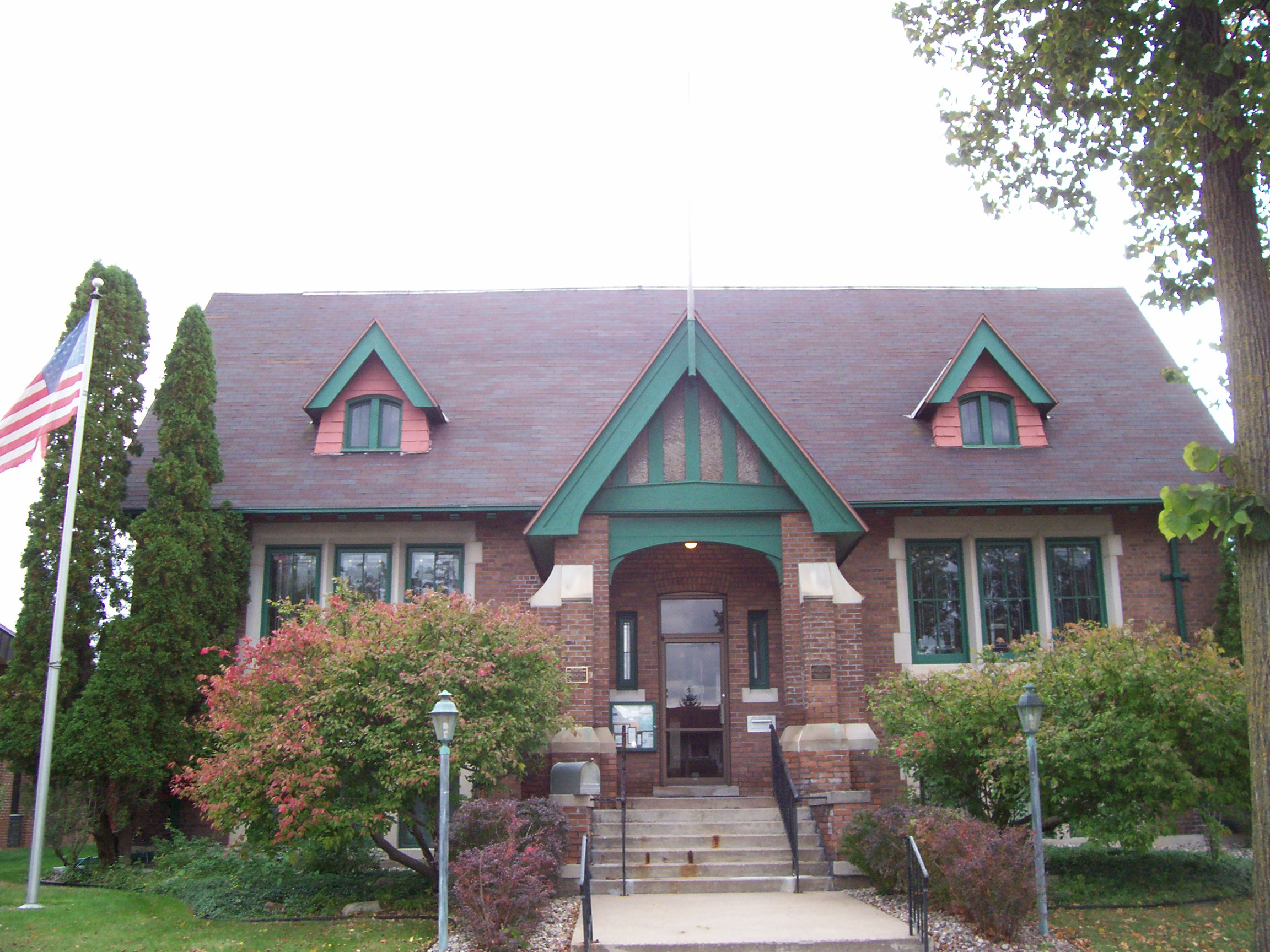
Waupaca Free Public Library

Parkinson & Dockendorff was an architectural firm based in La Crosse, Wisconsin, that was known for its works designed from 1905 through the 1930s. The firm's two named partners were Albert Edward Parkinson (1870 – September 19, 1952) and Bernard Joseph Dockendorff (January 22, 1878 – September 23, 1952). The firm is credited with designing over 800 public buildings, including "many of the most significant surviving Early Modern (1900–1940) commercial and public buildings" in La Crosse. A number of Parkinson & Dockendorff's works are listed on the National Register of Historic Places.

== Biographies ==
Parkinson was born in England and trained in architecture by his father. He moved to the United States and established an architecture practice at Sparta, Wisconsin, by 1897.

Dockendorff was born in La Crosse and was the son of German immigrants. After attending the La Crosse public schools, he studied architecture at the Technicum in Darmstadt, Germany, and with Ludwig Becker in Mayence. After returning to La Crosse, he established a partnership with Parkinson in 1905. Parkinson died on September 19, 1952. Dockendorff died four days later.

== Works ==
Works include:

=== Works in La Crosse ===
- Hoeschler Building – Scenic Center (1930), 115–117 Fifth Avenue South, La Crosse, Wisconsin (Parkinson & Dockendorff)
- Newburg Building – The Studio (1917), 413–421 Main Street, La Crosse, Wisconsin (Parkinson & Dockendorff)
- Physical Education Building/La Crosse State Normal School, University of Wisconsin–La Crosse Campus off US 16, La Crosse, Wisconsin (Dockendorff, B.), NRHP-listed
- Rivoli Building and Theater (1920), 115–123 Fourth Street North, La Crosse, Wisconsin (Parkinson & Dockendorff)
- St. Rose Convent - Reconstruction (1924)

=== Works elsewhere ===
- Bekkedal Leaf Tobacco Warehouse, 504 East Decker, Viroqua, Wisconsin (Parkinson and Dockendorf), NRHP-listed
- Berlin High School, 289 East Huron Street, Berlin, Wisconsin (Parkinson & Dockendorff), NRHP-listed
- Church of the Sacred Heart (Freeport), 110 3rd Avenue, NE, Freeport, Minnesota (Dockendorff, Bernard), NRHP-listed
- Church of the Sacred Heart (Heron Lake), 9th Street and 4th Avenue, Heron Lake, Minnesota (Parkinson, A. & B. Dockendorff), NRHP-listed
- La Crosse County School of Agriculture and Domestic Economy, 700 Wilson Ave., Onalaska, Wisconsin (Parkinson & Dockendorff), NRHP-listed
- Lincoln School (1925), 237 South Sawyer Street, Shawano, Wisconsin (Parkinson and Dockendorf), NRHP-listed
- Masonic Temple Building (Viroqua, Wisconsin), 116 South Main Street, Viroqua, Wisconsin (Dockendorff, Bernard, et al.), NRHP-listed
- Norwegian Evangelic Lutheran Church and Cemetery, Coon Prairie and East Coon Prairie Roads, Westby, Wisconsin (Parkinson & Dockendorff), NRHP-listed
- Willard D. Purdy Junior High and Vocational School, 110 West Third Street, Marshfield, Wisconsin (Parkinson & Dockendorff), NRHP-listed
- Charles Samuel Richter House, 55, 103, and 105 Underwood Avenue, Montello, Wisconsin (Parkinson & Dockendorff), NRHP-listed
- Sparta Masonic Temple, 200 West Main Street, Sparta, Wisconsin (Parkinson & Dockendorff), NRHP-listed
- Van Brunt Memorial School, 611 Mill Street, Horicon, Wisconsin (Parkinson & Dockendorff), 1922.
- Waupaca Free Public Library, 321 South Main Street, Waupaca, Wisconsin (Parkinson and Dockendorff), NRHP-listed
- Sacred Heart of Jesus Church, Cashton, Wisconsin (1919)
- Saint Patrick Church, Sparta, Wisconsin (1905)
- Saint Joseph Church, Lakefield, Minnesota (1924)
- Saint Joseph Church, Miesville, Minnesota (1907)
- Saint Gabriel Church, Fulda, Minnesota (1911)
- Saint Raphael Church, Springfield, Minnesota (1914)
- Saint Wenceslaus Church, Jackson, Minnesota (1924)
