= National Register of Historic Places listings in Chippewa County, Wisconsin =

Location of Chippewa County in Wisconsin

This is a list of the National Register of Historic Places listings in Chippewa County, Wisconsin. It is intended to provide a comprehensive listing of entries in the National Register of Historic Places that are located in Chippewa County, Wisconsin. The locations of National Register properties for which the latitude and longitude coordinates are included below may be seen in a map.

There are 13 properties and districts listed on the National Register in the county.

This National Park Service list is complete through NPS recent listings posted March 21, 2025.

== Current listings ==
	Name on the Register	Image	Date listed	Location	City or town	Description
1	Bridge Street Commercial Historic District	Bridge Street Commercial Historic District	June 24, 1994 (#94000648)	Roughly Bridge St. from Columbia to Spring Sts. 44°56′12″N 91°23′34″W	Chippewa Falls	33 contributing properties built from 1873 to 1943, including the Romanesque Revival First National Bank built in 1873, several Italianate buildings from the 1880s, the 1890 Caesar Harness Shop, and the 1908 Neoclassical Federal Building.
2	Chippewa Shoe Manufacturing Company	Chippewa Shoe Manufacturing Company	March 7, 1994 (#94000133)	28 W. River St. 44°56′04″N 91°23′30″W	Chippewa Falls	Four-story brick shoe factory built in 1910 and operated until 1974, at its peak employing 175 and producing 1500 pairs of shoes and boots per day. The one survivor of five shoe factories that diversified Chippewa's economy as lumbering waned.
3	Cook-Rutledge House	Cook-Rutledge House	August 7, 1974 (#74000060)	505 W. Grand Ave. 44°55′56″N 91°23′57″W	Chippewa Falls	This High Victorian-Italianate mansion was started in 1873 by James M. Bingham lawyer and lieutenant governor, then expanded by Edward Rutledge, a lumberman and assistant to Frederick Weyerhaeuser. From 1915 on it was home to the family of Dayton Cook, county judge.
4	Cornell Pulpwood Stacker	Cornell Pulpwood Stacker	December 23, 1993 (#93001425)	Cornell Mill Yard Park; 45°10′29″N 91°09′17″W	Cornell	175 foot tall conveyor for stacking pulpwood for Cornell Wood Products' paper mill, used from 1912 to 1971. Cornell's is probably the only such stacker remaining in the US.
5	Hotel Chippewa	Hotel Chippewa	June 30, 1994 (#94000598)	16-18 N. Bay St. 44°56′04″N 91°23′33″W	Chippewa Falls	3-story brick railroad hotel built in 1915. It was modern at the time, with a telephone in every room and iron fire escapes.
6	Marsh Rainbow Arch Bridge	Marsh Rainbow Arch Bridge	June 25, 1982 (#82000642)	Spring St. 44°56′11″N 91°23′26″W	Chippewa Falls	Patented 93 foot single-span reinforced concrete arch bridge over Duncan Creek, built in 1916. It was the only bridge over Duncan that survived the flood of 1934.
7	McDonell Central Catholic High School	McDonell Central Catholic High School	October 6, 1982 (#82001840)	3 S. High St. 44°55′50″N 91°23′16″W	Chippewa Falls	Neoclassical-styled Catholic high school built in 1907, funded by lumberman Alexander McDonell. The building now houses the Heyde Center for the Arts.
8	D. R. Moon Memorial Library	D. R. Moon Memorial Library	December 2, 1985 (#85003096)	E. Fourth Ave. 44°57′44″N 90°56′07″W	Stanley	The Classical revival library was built in 1901 in memory of Delos R. Moon, president of the Northwestern Lumber Company, who brought the sawmill to Stanley in the 1880s.
9	Notre Dame Church and Goldsmith Memorial Chapel	Notre Dame Church and Goldsmith Memorial Chapel	April 7, 1983 (#83003369)	117 Allen St. 44°56′09″N 91°23′12″W	Chippewa Falls	Catholic church built 1870-1872 of sandstone quarried in Irvine Park under leadership of Father Charles Goldsmith. The Romanesque Revival chapel was added in 1894 in memory of Goldsmith.
10	L.I. Roe House	L.I. Roe House	August 27, 1980 (#80000112)	410 N. Franklin St. 44°57′48″N 90°55′53″W	Stanley	Large home built in 1892 and expanded in 1906. Norwegian immigrant Roe was a clerk in the Northwestern Lumber Company's store, president of the school board, first president of the Citizen's State Bank, and ran a wood products factory.
11	Sheeley House	Sheeley House	September 5, 1985 (#85001949)	236 W. River St. 44°55′58″N 91°23′40″W	Chippewa Falls	Brick Italianate saloon and boarding house built in 1884, at the height of logging in the Chippewa Valley. Now a restaurant and saloon.
12	West Hill Residential Historic District	West Hill Residential Historic District	October 20, 2021 (#100006503)	Generally bounded by Coleman, Superior, Central, Governor, and Dover Sts. 44°56′03″N 91°24′14″W	Chippewa Falls	Old neighborhood on a bluff above the Chippewa River, with homes in various styles ranging from the 1875 brick Italianate-style Le Duc house, built by a bookkeeper for a lumber company during the boom years, to a 1951 Ranch-style house.
13	Z.C.B.J. Hall	Z.C.B.J. Hall	June 25, 1992 (#92000812)	WI 27, 7 mi (11 km). N of Cadott; 45°02′19″N 91°08′46″W	Arthur	Social hall clad in stamped metal siding, built by Bohemian (Czech) immigrants in 1907. See Zapadni Ceska Bratrska Jednota.

== See also ==
- List of National Historic Landmarks in Wisconsin
- National Register of Historic Places listings in Wisconsin
- Listings in neighboring counties: Barron, Clark, Dunn, Eau Claire, Rusk, Taylor
