= National Register of Historic Places listings in Rusk County, Wisconsin =

Location of Rusk County in Wisconsin

This is a list of the National Register of Historic Places listings in Rusk County, Wisconsin. It is intended to provide a comprehensive listing of entries in the National Register of Historic Places that are located in Rusk County, Wisconsin. The locations of National Register properties for which the latitude and longitude coordinates are included below may be seen in a map.

There are three properties and districts listed on the National Register in the county.

This National Park Service list is complete through NPS recent listings posted September 26, 2025.

== Current listings ==
	Name on the Register	Image	Date listed	Location	City or town	Description
1	Flambeau Mission Church	Flambeau Mission Church	August 7, 1979 (#79000113)	11 miles S of Ladysmith on 27; then 5 miles W on D 45°18′08″N 91°11′55″W	Washington	Oldest church in Rusk County, built on the banks of the Chippewa River in 1882, during the peak of log driving, to serve the French and Indian community called Flambeau Farms.
2	Harold J. and Agnes McFarlane Stone House and Barn	Harold J. and Agnes McFarlane Stone House and Barn	November 22, 2016 (#16000803)	N6435 Hackett Rd. 45°31′14″N 90°48′08″W	Hawkins	Dairy barn and farmhouse with walls of local fieldstone hauled on stone-boat by Harold from his rock-piles and laid by Charles Burce in 1941. The barn has concrete quoins and the stonework on the house is rather whimsical, with tapered walls and a repeated wheel motif.
3	State Bank of Ladysmith	State Bank of Ladysmith	January 17, 1980 (#80000192)	102 W. 2nd St. 45°27′52″N 91°06′08″W	Ladysmith	1912 Classical Revival building with facade of rusticated granite, formerly known as Pioneer Bank, the Rusk County Bank, and "the bank with the clock." The bank originally rented out office space on the second floor, including to two lumber companies.

== See also ==
- List of National Historic Landmarks in Wisconsin
- National Register of Historic Places listings in Wisconsin
- Listings in neighboring counties: Barron, Chippewa, Price, Sawyer, Taylor, Washburn
