= National Register of Historic Places listings in Barron County, Wisconsin =

Location of Barron County in Wisconsin

This is a list of the National Register of Historic Places listings in Barron County, Wisconsin. It is intended to provide a comprehensive listing of entries in the National Register of Historic Places that are located in Barron County, Wisconsin. The locations of National Register properties for which the latitude and longitude coordinates are included below may be seen in a map.

There are 10 properties and districts listed on the National Register in the county. Another property was once listed but has been removed.

This National Park Service list is complete through NPS recent listings posted August 29, 2025.

== Current listings ==
| | Name on the Register | Image | Date listed | Location | City or town | Description |
|---|---|---|---|---|---|---|
| 1 | Barron County Pipestone Quarry | Barron County Pipestone Quarry | December 22, 1978 (#78000077) | East of Rice Lake | Rice Lake | Site where American Indians quarried pipestone for making ceremonial pipes. |
| 2 | Chicago, St. Paul, Minneapolis and Omaha Railroad Passenger Station | Chicago, St. Paul, Minneapolis and Omaha Railroad Passenger Station | June 21, 2007 (#07000588) | 426 Tainter Ave. 45°30′21″N 91°44′19″W | Rice Lake | Depot built in 1909, before automobiles, when railways were major carriers of both passengers and freight. |
| 3 | Cumberland Public Library | Cumberland Public Library | June 25, 1992 (#92000804) | 1305 Second Ave. 45°32′03″N 92°01′18″W | Cumberland | Carnegie Library opened in 1906 with a $10,000 donation from Andrew Carnegie. Style is Classical Revival. |
| 4 | Franklin School | Franklin School | March 24, 2015 (#15000107) | 1011 S. Main St. 45°29′23″N 91°43′58″W | Rice Lake | Brick grade school designed by William Linley Alban in Art Deco style and built in 1936 during the Great Depression, but funded by the city of Rice Lake alone. |
| 5 | Island of Happy Days | | February 24, 1995 (#95000141) | Stout Island, Red Cedar Lake; 45°36′39″N 91°35′16″W | Cedar Lake | Rustic summer retreat of the heirs of the Stout of Knapp-Stout & Co, the lumber company, from 1903 to 1927. |
| 6 | Rice Lake Mounds (47 BN-90) | Rice Lake Mounds (47 BN-90) | September 7, 1979 (#79000059) | Address Restricted | Rice Lake | Several burial mounds believed to have been constructed by Dakota people near the lakeshore in the northern portion of the city — now located within a city park. |
| 7 | St. Mary's Rectory | St. Mary's Rectory | April 4, 2011 (#11000152) | 1575 Second Ave. 45°32′19″N 92°01′21″W | Cumberland | Catholic rectory built in 1904 in an unusual mix of Queen Anne and Richardsonian Romanesque styles. |
| 8 | Edward N. and Mary T. Stebbins House | Edward N. and Mary T. Stebbins House | October 18, 2006 (#06000945) | 130 E. Division Ave. 45°24′05″N 91°51′20″W | Barron | 1895 Georgian Revival house built by Edward N. Stebbins, factory owner and mayor of Barron, who came from Pennsylvania in 1891. |
| 9 | Wajiwan ji Mashkode Archeological District | Wajiwan ji Mashkode Archeological District | September 11, 2003 (#03000938) | Address Restricted | Rice Lake | |
| 10 | ZCBJ Hall | ZCBJ Hall | April 11, 1985 (#85000768) | 320 W. 3rd St. 45°36′28″N 91°46′44″W | Haugen | Meeting hall of Zapadni Ceska Bratrska Jednota, or Western Czechoslovak Fraternal Association, built in 1913 in Boomtown style. |

== Former listings ==
| | Name on the Register | Image | Date listed | Date removed | Location | City or town | Description |
|---|---|---|---|---|---|---|---|
| 1 | Rice Lake Carnegie Library | | June 20, 1980 (#80000434) | March 20, 1986 | 16 S. Main St. | Rice Lake | Neoclassical brownstone Carnegie library built in 1905 and demolished in 1985. |

== See also ==
- List of National Historic Landmarks in Wisconsin
- National Register of Historic Places listings in Wisconsin
- Listings in neighboring counties: Burnett, Chippewa, Dunn, Polk, Rusk, Sawyer, St. Croix, Washburn
