= Empire Block =

Empire Block may refer to:

- Empire Block (Pendleton, Oregon), listed on the National Register of Historic Places in Umatilla County, Oregon
- Empire Block (Superior, Wisconsin), listed on the National Register of Historic Places in Douglas County, Wisconsin
