= National Register of Historic Places listings in Douglas County, Wisconsin =

Location of Douglas County in Wisconsin

This is a list of the National Register of Historic Places listings in Douglas County, Wisconsin. It is intended to provide a comprehensive listing of entries in the National Register of Historic Places that are located in Douglas County, Wisconsin. The locations of National Register properties for which the latitude and longitude coordinates are included below may be seen in a map.

There are 21 properties and districts listed on the National Register in the county. Another property was once listed but has been removed.

This National Park Service list is complete through NPS recent listings posted September 4, 2026.

== Current listings ==
	Name on the Register	Image	Date listed	Location	City or town	Description
1	Berkshire Block	Berkshire Block	June 27, 1985 (#85001466)	917-927 Tower Avenue; 46°43′37″N 92°06′15″W	Superior	Business block built in 1892 in Romanesque Revival style with exterior of Kasota limestone, and finished by Scandinavian craftsmen. First housed the State Bank of Wisconsin, later department stores, Holden Insurance, and now AMSOIL.
2	Brule-St. Croix Portage	Brule-St. Croix Portage	October 15, 1970 (#70000033)	Brule River State Forest; 46°23′18″N 91°45′25″W	Solon Springs	Two-mile portage trail from the St. Croix River in the Mississippi watershed to the Bois Brule River in the Great Lakes watershed. Used by Native Americans and early European explorers. The first recorded was du Lhut in 1680, later Jonathan Carver and Henry Schoolcraft.
3	Davidson Windmill	Davidson Windmill	August 3, 1979 (#79000075)	SE of Superior on WI 13; 46°38′56″N 91°54′21″W	Lakeside	Finnish immigrant Jacob Davidson (Jaako Tapola) constructed this windmill in 1900 to grind animal feed.
4	Douglas County Courthouse	Douglas County Courthouse	March 9, 1982 (#82000664)	1313 Belknap Street; 46°43′16″N 92°05′49″W	Superior	Massive three-story limestone and marble courthouse built 1918-1919 in Classical Revival style.
5	Empire Block	Empire Block	June 27, 1985 (#85001467)	1202-1208 Tower Avenue; 46°43′27″N 92°06′12″W	Superior	Victorian Romanesque business block designed by Carl Wirth and built in 1892. Lurye's Furniture was an occupant from 1937 to 2012.
6	Antoine and Sarah Gordon House		June 10, 2022 (#100007769)	97 Cty. Rd. Y 46°15′31″N 91°44′27″W	Gordon	The core of this house is a log cabin built in 1859 by the founder of Gordon as his home, trading post, and a resting place on the stagecoach line running from Fort Snelling to Bayfield. The Gordons helped support a local Ojibwa and Metis community into the 1880s.
7	Lake Nebagamon Auditorium	Lake Nebagamon Auditorium	September 14, 1981 (#81000041)	1st Street; 46°30′48″N 91°41′56″W	Lake Nebagamon	Rustic-styled community center with cobblestone chimney, built in 1936.
8	Maryland Block	Maryland Block	June 27, 1985 (#85001468)	1221-1227 Tower Avenue; 46°43′24″N 92°06′15″W	Superior	Neoclassical commercial building developed by the Land and River Improvement Company and built in 1892. A.k.a. the Badger Building.
9	METEOR (Whaleback carrier)	METEOR (Whaleback carrier)	September 9, 1974 (#74000081)	NW tip of Barkers Island; 46°43′23″N 92°03′47″W	Superior	380-foot whaleback freighter, the last remaining in the world. Built in 1896 in Superior, the Meteor hauled iron ore, grain, and liquids up and down the Great Lakes until 1969. Now a museum. A boundary decrease was approved on April 26, 2018.
10	Minnesota Block-Board of Trade Bldg.	Minnesota Block-Board of Trade Bldg.	June 27, 1985 (#85001470)	1501-1511 Tower Avenue; 46°43′14″N 92°06′14″W	Superior	Four-story Neoclassical building, supposedly fireproof, designed by C. C. Haight and built in 1892 by the Land and River Improvement Company. Housed Spicer-Fanning Dry Goods in lower floors and Board of Trade in upper.
11	New Jersey Building	New Jersey Building	September 22, 1983 (#83003373)	1422-1432 Tower Avenue and 1705-1723 Belknap Street; 46°43′16″N 92°06′11″W	Superior	Business block built in 1889 in Romanesque Revival style by the Land and River Improvement Co. Named for the investors, from New Jersey. Originally housed 5 storefronts on street level and six luxury apartments above.
12	New York Block	New York Block	June 27, 1985 (#85001472)	1402-1412 Tower Avenue; 46°43′18″N 92°06′12″W	Superior	Romanesque Revival business block built in 1890 by the Land and River Improvement Co. Named for the investors, from New York. Housed ten stores at street level.
13	Northern Block	Northern Block	June 27, 1985 (#85001471)	2229 East 5th Street; 46°42′14″N 92°02′55″W	Superior	Business block constructed in 1892 by local investors.
14	Martin Pattison House	Martin Pattison House	February 12, 1981 (#81000042)	906 East 2nd Street; 46°43′05″N 92°03′46″W	Superior	Queen Anne-style home with four-story turret, built around 1890 by Pattison, a lumber and mining baron and mayor of Superior. Became the Superior Children's Home orphanage from 1920 to 1962. Now the Fairlawn Museum.
15	Roosevelt Terrace	Roosevelt Terrace	January 12, 2005 (#04001483)	1700-1714 North 21st Street and 2105-2109 Ogden Avenue; 46°42′55″N 92°06′10″W	Superior	Apartment building owned by James Roosevelt, Sr., father of FDR. Designed by Carl Wirth in 1890 in Richardsonian Romanesque style.
16	Superior Entry South Breakwater Light	Superior Entry South Breakwater Light	March 1, 2007 (#07000102)	Superior Entry South Breakwater offshore end. 0.4 mi (0.64 km). NE of Wisconsin Point; 46°42′37″N 92°00′22″W	Superior	Lighthouse built in 1913 to guide ships to the entry to Duluth-Superior harbor through the ten-mile sandbar which shelters it.
17	A.D. Thompson Cabin		August 11, 2022 (#100007979)	13393 South St. Croix Rd. 46°16′49″N 91°46′14″W	Gordon	Rustic log cabin built in 1906 as a summer retreat from Minneapolis for Thompson, a grain broker and director of the Northern(?) Railroad.
18	Trade and Commerce Building	Trade and Commerce Building	May 8, 1979 (#79000076)	916 Hammond Avenue; 46°43′38″N 92°05′50″W	Superior	Five-story office building designed by Clarence H. Johnston, Sr. in Richardsonian Romanesque style and built around 1890 by Henry Minot's Superior Improvement Company. Later housed Superior's city hall.
19	Washington Block	Washington Block	June 27, 1985 (#85001473)	1517-1523 Tower Avenue; 46°43′12″N 92°06′14″W	Superior	Office block built in 1890 by the Land and River Improvement Company and W. H. Folsom of New York. Housed the Northwest Hanna Coal Company offices, among others.
20	Wemyss Building	Wemyss Building	June 27, 1985 (#85001474)	1301-1305 Tower Avenue; 46°43′23″N 92°06′15″W	Superior	Commercial building, probably designed by Carl Wirth, with elements of Romanesque and Classical Revival styles. Built in 1892 by the Land and River Improvement Company and named for its manager, Rowland J. Wemyss. The building was demolished.
21	Wisconsin Point	Wisconsin Point	July 8, 2021 (#100006701)	Address Restricted	Superior vicinity	Site of a Chippewa village and cemetery from the mid-1800s.

== Former listing ==
	Name on the Register	Image	Date listed	Date removed	Location	City or town	Description
1	Massachusetts Block		June 27, 1985 (#85001469)	April 6, 2011	1525-1531 Tower Avenue; 46°43′10″N 92°06′14″W	Superior	Office block designed by Carl Wirth in Romanesque Revival style and constructed 1889. Part of Speculative Commercial Blocks of Superior's Boom Period 1888–1892 Thematic Resource. Demolished 1990.

== See also ==
- List of National Historic Landmarks in Wisconsin
- National Register of Historic Places listings in Wisconsin
- Listings in neighboring counties: Bayfield, Burnett, Carlton (MN), Pine (MN), St. Louis (MN), Sawyer, Washburn
