= National Register of Historic Places listings in Burnett County, Wisconsin =

Location of Burnett County in Wisconsin

This is a list of the National Register of Historic Places listings in Burnett County, Wisconsin. It is intended to provide a comprehensive listing of entries in the National Register of Historic Places that are located in Burnett County, Wisconsin. The locations of National Register properties for which the latitude and longitude coordinates are included below may be seen in a map.

There are 9 properties and districts listed on the National Register in the county.

This National Park Service list is complete through NPS recent listings posted March 21, 2025.

== Current listings ==
	Name on the Register	Image	Date listed	Location	City or town	Description
1	Altern Site	Altern Site	March 31, 1980 (#80000391)	Address Restricted	Hertel	A group of well-preserved circular and linear mounds constructed from Middle Woodland to historic times.
2	Burnett County Abstract Company	Burnett County Abstract Company	May 7, 1980 (#80000109)	214 N. Oak St. 45°46′40″N 92°41′01″W	Grantsburg	1907 building that housed the Burnett County Abstract Company which performed title searches, facilitating transfers of real estate in the county. The Burnett County courthouse was located across the street until the county seat was moved to Siren.
3	Daniels Town Hall	Daniels Town Hall	December 20, 2006 (#06001154)	9602 WI 70; 45°46′08″N 92°28′40″W	Daniels	Swedish Lutherans built this church at Mud Hen Lake in 1886, but the congregation moved in 1893. The building has been the Daniels Town Hall ever since.
4	Ebert Mound Group (47Bt28)	Ebert Mound Group (47Bt28)	July 9, 1982 (#82000639)	Address Restricted	Yellow Lake	
5	Fickle Site (47BT25)	Fickle Site (47BT25)	January 26, 1990 (#89002310)	Address Restricted	Siren	
6	Jacobson House and Mill Site		April 22, 1980 (#80000110)	E of Grantsburg on SR M 45°45′33″N 92°33′45″W	Grantsburg	Clapboard, side-gabled house built in 1873.
7	Northwest and XY Company Trading Post Sites	Northwest and XY Company Trading Post Sites	February 15, 1974 (#74000059)	N of Webster on County U 45°56′21″N 92°25′18″W	Webster	Site of competing British fur trading posts of North West Company and XY Company from 1802 to 1805, now reconstructed at Forts Folle Avoine Historical Park.
8	Sandrock Cliffs	Sandrock Cliffs	May 1, 1990 (#90000632)	Address Restricted; 45°47′37″N 92°46′11″W	Grantsburg	Remnants of the retreating Cambrian sea left deep sandstone which was carved by glacial meltwater, revealing cliffs revered by indigenous people.
9	Yellow River Swamp Site 47-Bt-36	Yellow River Swamp Site 47-Bt-36	February 28, 1985 (#85000405)	Address Restricted	Webster	

== See also ==
- List of National Historic Landmarks in Wisconsin
- National Register of Historic Places listings in Wisconsin
- Listings in neighboring counties: Barron, Chisago (MN), Douglas, Pine (MN), Polk, Washburn
