= St. Mary's Rectory =

St. Mary's Rectory may refer to:

- St. Mary's Rectory (Iowa City, Iowa), listed on the U.S. National Register of Historic Places (NRHP)
- St. Mary's Rectory (Aquasco, Maryland), NRHP-listed
- St. Mary's Rectory (Sandusky, Ohio), NRHP-listed
- St. Mary's Rectory (Cumberland, Wisconsin), NRHP-listed
