= Sheely =

Sheely may refer to:

- Earl Sheely (1893 - 1952), first baseman for the Chicago White Sox
- Sheelytown (Omaha), ethnic Irish neighborhood in South Omaha, Nebraska

== See also ==
- Sheeley (disambiguation)
