= National Register of Historic Places listings in Washburn County, Wisconsin =

Location of Washburn County in Wisconsin

This is a list of the National Register of Historic Places listings in Washburn County, Wisconsin. It is intended to provide a comprehensive listing of entries in the National Register of Historic Places that are located in Washburn County, Wisconsin. The locations of National Register properties for which the latitude and longitude coordinates are included below may be seen in a map.

There are 3 properties and districts listed on the National Register in the county, and one former listing.

This National Park Service list is complete through NPS recent listings posted September 12, 2025.

== Current listings ==
	Name on the Register	Image	Date listed	Location	City or town	Description
1	Bishop Stanislaus Vincent Bona Cabin		November 12, 2020 (#100005753)	W9420 Bona Dr. 46°07′38″N 92°01′04″W	Minong	Large rustic cabin built in 1925 on Scovils Lake and used by Roman Catholic Bishop Stanislaus Vincent Bona and priests for fishing and leisure.
2	Mrs. Richard Polson House	Mrs. Richard Polson House	February 8, 1984 (#84003798)	Trails End Rd, east of 53, north of Spooner; 45°50′20″N 91°52′30″W	Spooner	1917 Prairie School home designed by Purcell & Elmslie. Mrs. Polson built the house as a wedding gift for her son and his wife.
3	George V. Siegner House	George V. Siegner House	March 1, 1982 (#82000716)	513 Dale Street; 45°49′43″N 91°53′36″W	Spooner	Queen Anne-styled home built by the owner of Spooner's Big C.O.D. Bee Hive department store of the early 1900s.

== Former listing ==
	Name on the Register	Image	Date listed	Date removed	Location	City or town	Description
1	Salem Lutheran Church		July 3, 1980 (#80004596)	September 6, 1984	301 8th Avenue West	Shell Lake	Late Gothic Revival-style Lutheran church with stained glass windows, built in 1895. Demolished in 1984.

== See also ==
- List of National Historic Landmarks in Wisconsin
- National Register of Historic Places listings in Wisconsin
- Listings in neighboring counties: Barron, Bayfield, Burnett, Douglas, Rusk, Sawyer
