= Kasota limestone =

Type of rock in southern Minnesota

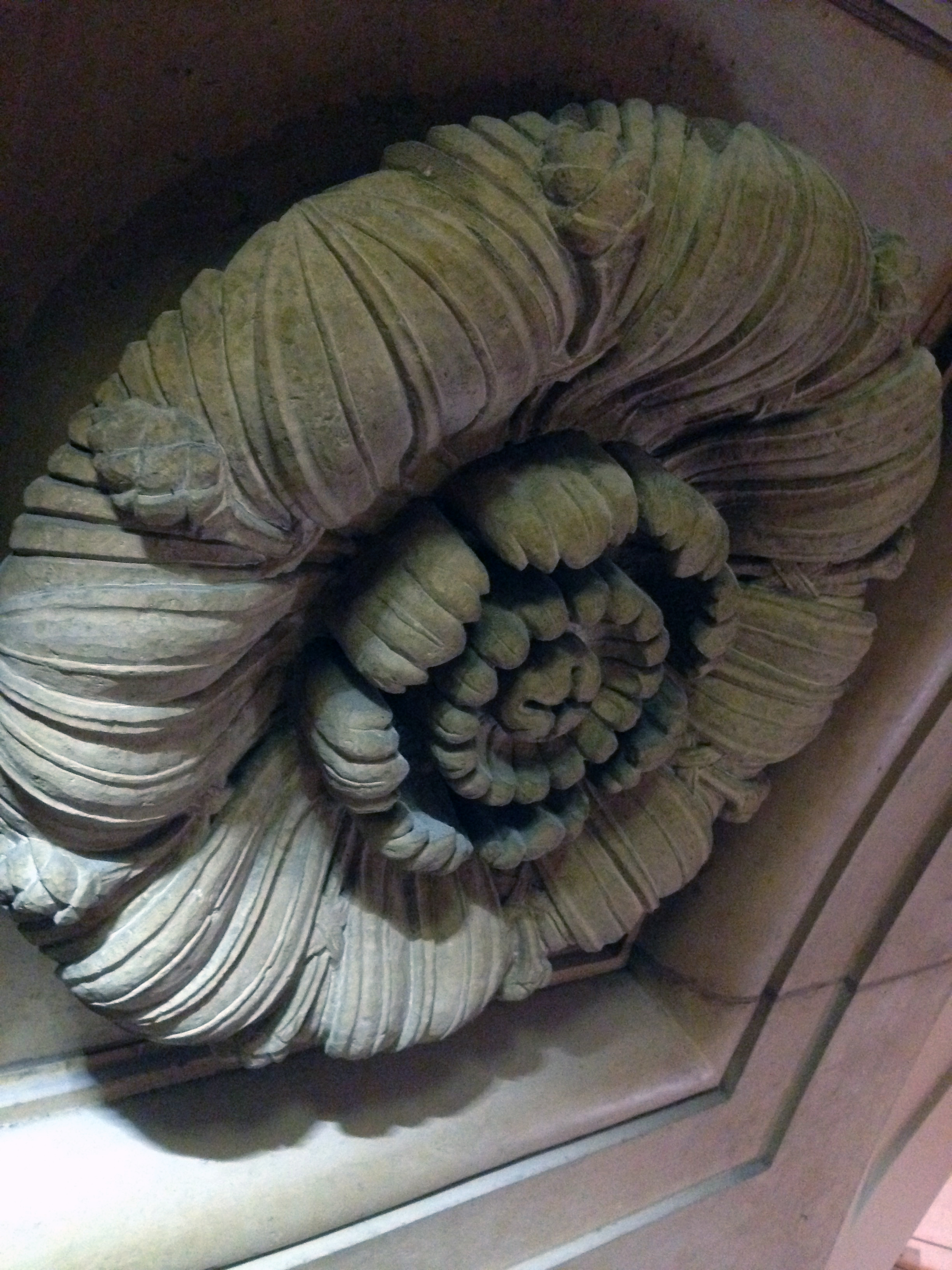
Kasota stonework detail in the Minnesota State Capitol

Kasota limestone or simply, Kasota stone, also called Mankato stone, is a dolomitic limestone found in southern Minnesota, especially near the Minnesota River and its tributaries. This sedimentary rock is part of the Oneota Dolomite of southern Minnesota and is approximately 450 million years old (lower Ordovician Period). This particular limestone is rich in dolomite and magnesium, making it resistant to weathering, and it is thus widely used as a building material. Its name is taken from Kasota Township where the stone has been quarried.

== Buildings ==
- Smithsonian National Museum of the American Indian, in Washington, DC.
- Cathedral of the Immaculate Conception, Springfield, IL, consecrated in 1928.
- Hesburgh Library, Notre Dame, IN, opened in 1963.
- United States Courthouse, Davenport, IA, completed in 1933.
- Minnesota State University, Mankato, most of the buildings on the original Wilson campus (Main in 1869) and the Highland campus, including the new campus signs, Preska and Sears Halls.
- "Kasota Building" Minneapolis (Gateway District). The building was demolished in an Urban Renewal act during the late 1950s.
- Target Field, the home of the Major League Baseball Minnesota Twins in Minneapolis, Minnesota.
- University of St. Thomas's Minneapolis campus and much of its St. Paul Campus, Minneapolis-St. Paul, MN.
- Scoville Memorial Library (now Scoville Hall) of Carleton College in Northfield, Minnesota, designed by Patton and Fisher of Chicago.
- Minnesota State Capitol interior walls, St. Paul, MN, completed in 1905.
- Gustavus Adolphus College's original "Old Main" building (St. Peter, MN, USA), completed in 1876.
- Liberty Memorial and National World War I Museum, Kansas City, MO.
- Philadelphia Museum of Art, Philadelphia, PA, completed 1928.
- PNC Park, the home of the Major League Baseball Pittsburgh Pirates in Pittsburgh, Pennsylvania.
- Berkshire Block, exterior, Superior, WI.
- Alan I W Frank House external facade; designed by Walter Gropius and Marcel Breuer in 1939.
- Milwaukee Journal Sentinel building, Milwaukee, WI, completed in 1924.
- Sterling Memorial Library floor of the main entrance hall, or "nave".
- Annunciation Catholic Church in Minneapolis, MN

== Gallery ==
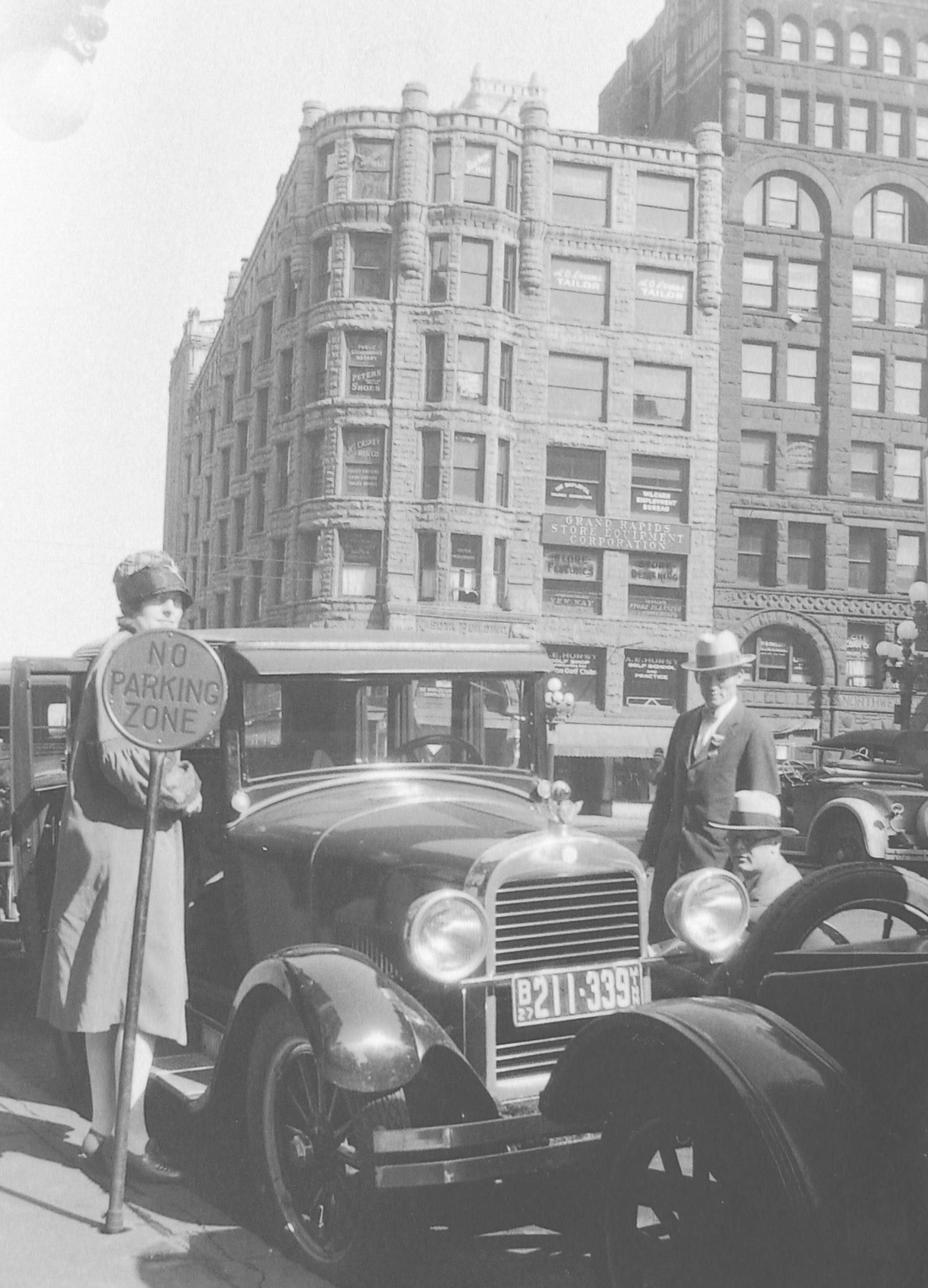
"Kasota Building" Minneapolis 1927

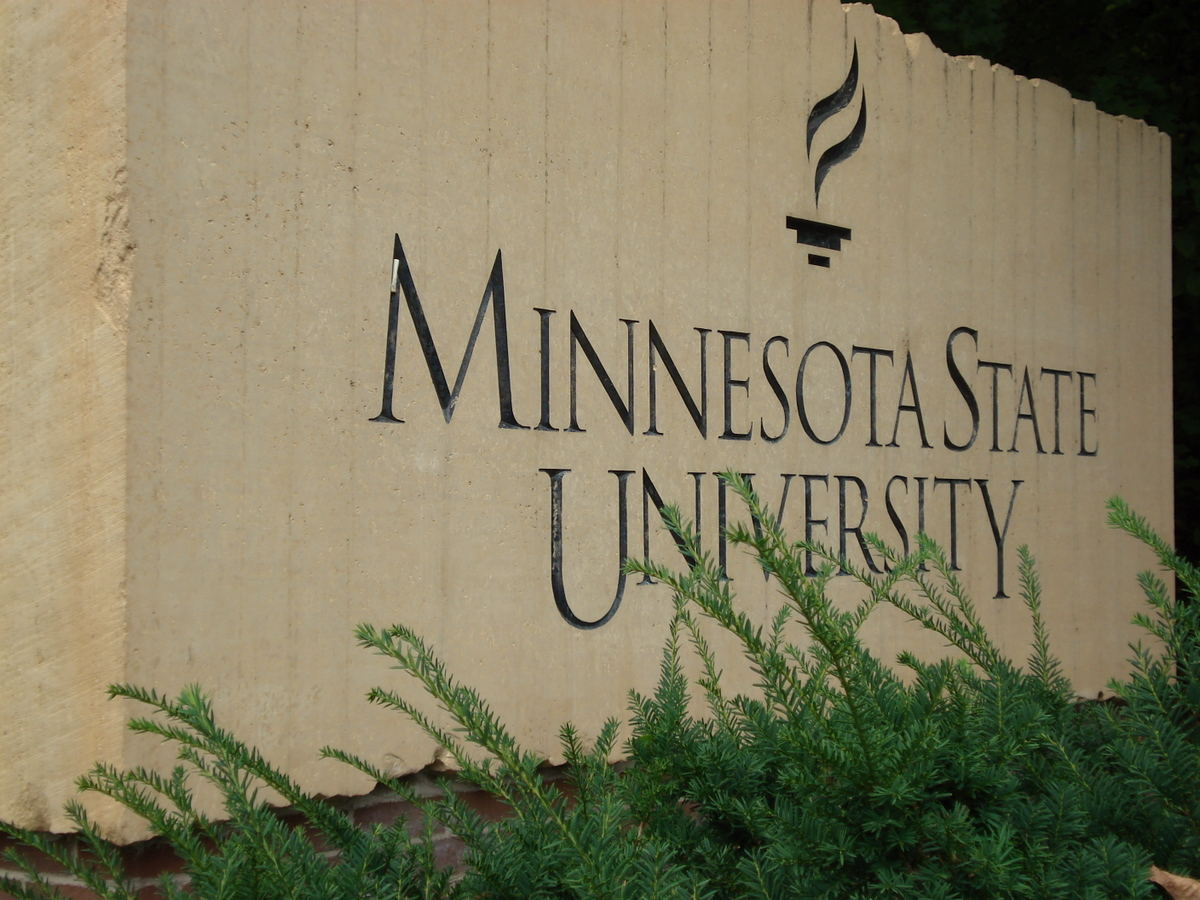
The entrance signs to Minnesota State University, Mankato are carved out a single block of Kasota stone.

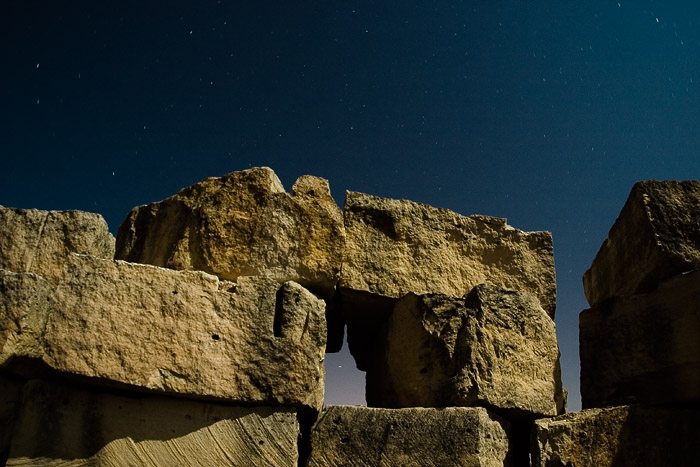
Kasota limestone at night.
