= West Hill Residential Historic District =

Historic district in Wisconsin, United States

- U.S. National Register of Historic Places
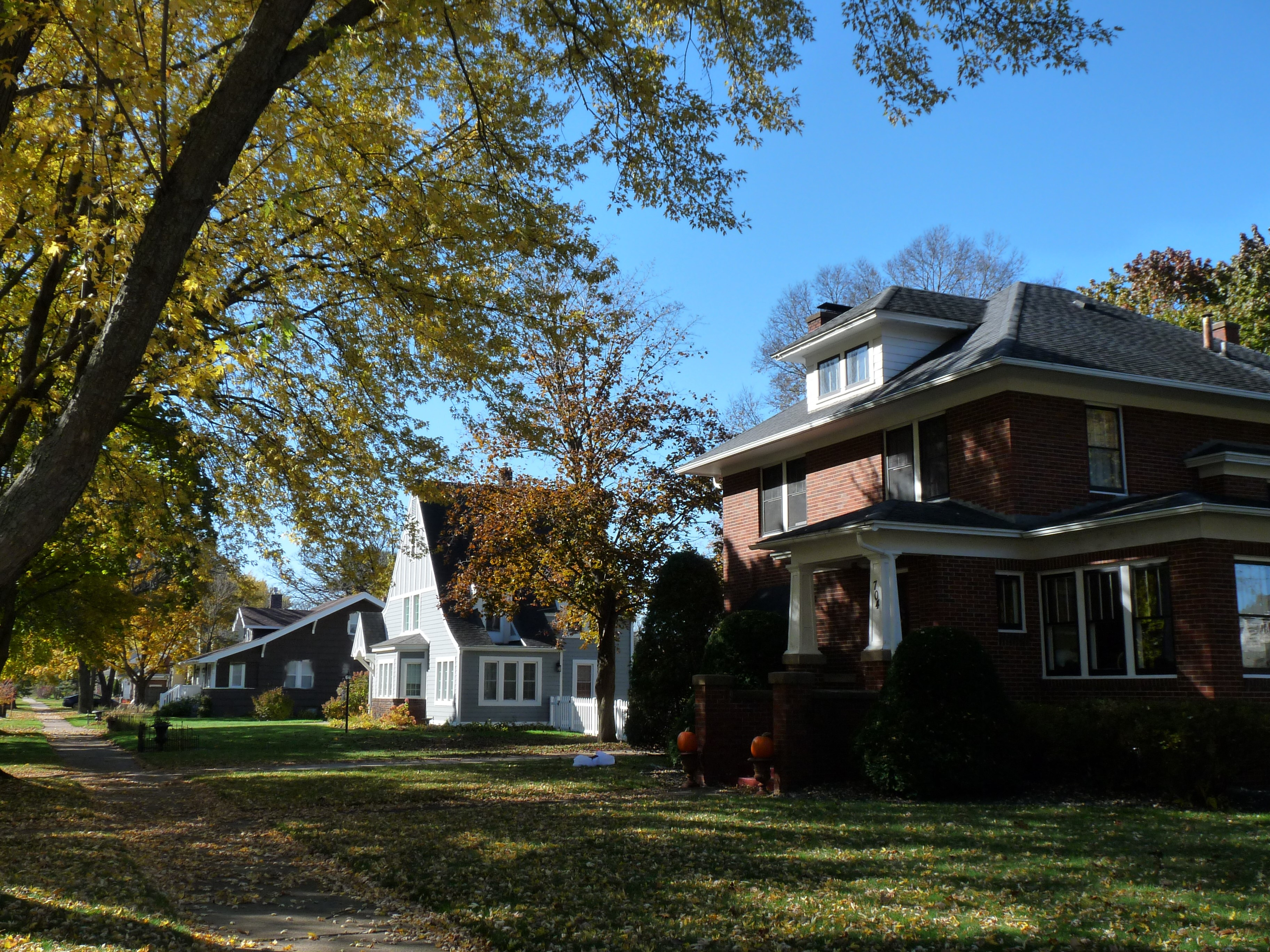
- From left, the 1923 Dierken bungalow, the 1927 Tudor Revival G.W. Knight house, and the 1925 American Foursquare Myrman house
- Location: Generally bounded by Coleman, Superior, Central, Governor, and Dover Streets, Chippewa Falls, Wisconsin
- Area: 66 acres (27 ha)
- NRHP reference No.: 100006503
- Added to NRHP: Oct 20, 2021

The West Hill Residential Historic District is a historic neighborhood on a bluff above the Chippewa River west of downtown Chippewa Falls, Wisconsin. It includes 163 contributing properties in a variety of styles, ranging from mansions of lumber executives built in the 1870s to ranch houses of the 1950s. In 2021 the district was placed on the National Register of Historic Places.

The community of Chippewa Falls began when Jean Brunet led a crew up the Chippewa River into the wilderness in 1836 or 1837 to build a sawmill at the Falls. They managed to build a mill, and despite setbacks it grew into what by the 1880s was said to be "the largest sawmill under one roof in the world." The settlement around the mill grew into a city. After peaking in the 1880s, the sawmill business declined until the big mill finally closed in 1911, but by then other industries were under way: flour mills, a brewery, a woolen mill, shoe factories, a sugar beet factory, and others. For more background, see Chippewa Falls history.

Most of Chippewa Falls' early homes were mixed in with the businesses along Bridge Street, River Street, and Spring Street. In the 1870s when that area filled up and the needs of businesses began crowding homes out of the commercial area, neighborhoods filled in up "Catholic Hill" to the east and to the west of the business district. Part of that west side included stylish homes of the wealthy, and many of those homes remain relatively intact in what has become the West Hill Historic district.

Styles of buildings in the district followed much the same progression as in other cities in Wisconsin. These are good examples of different styles in the district, listed roughly in the order built:

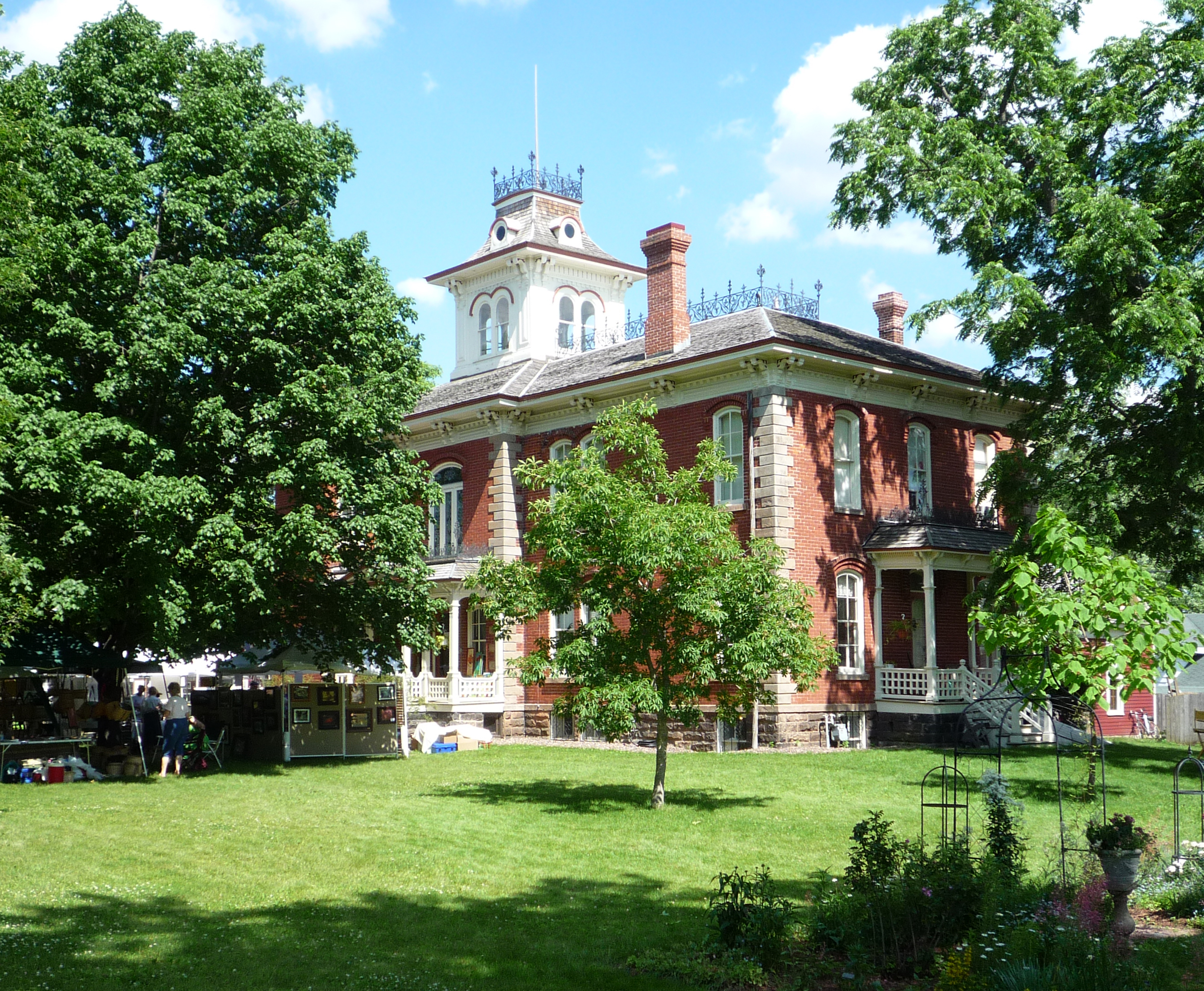
Cook-Rutledge house, 1873, Italianate style

- The Cook-Rutledge House at 505 W Grand Ave is a 2-story mansion begun in 1873 by attorney and Assemblyman James M. Bingham and his wife Justine. Edward Rutledge, vice president of the Chippewa Lumber and Boom Company, bought it in 1887 and expanded and remodeled it to its current appearance. The style is Italianate, with its hallmarks the low-pitched roof with paired brackets under the eaves, and the decorative hood moulds above the windows. A belvedere on the roof is also typical of the style, though not usually so large as this and not usually with the flared roof. The house also has tall decorative chimneys, metal cresting on the roof, stone quoins highlighting the corners of the red brick walls, a large porte-cochère out front, and an 1873 carriage barn behind. Attorney Dayton Cook and his family lived in the house from 1915 to 1973. The house is now a museum.

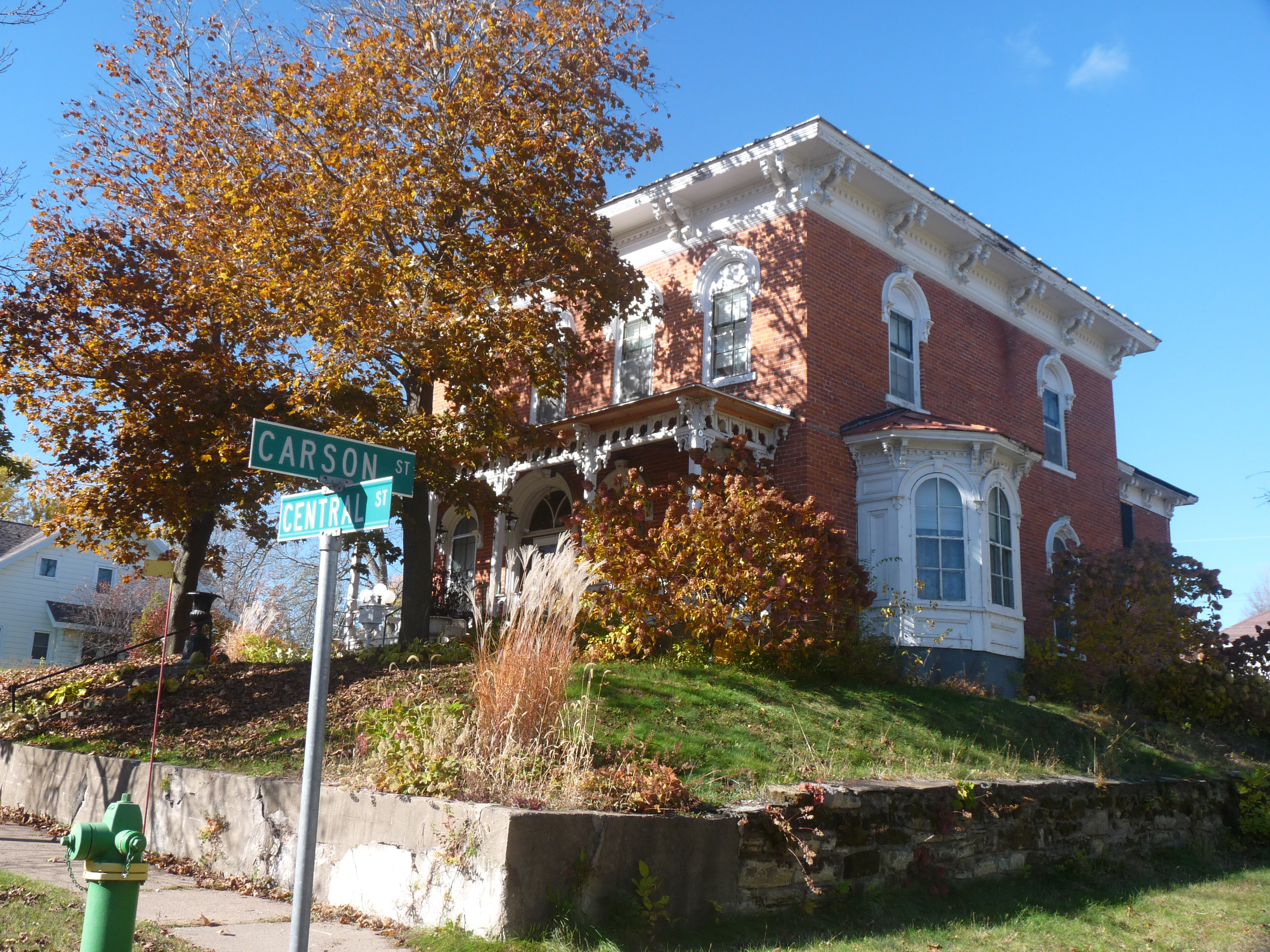
LeDuc house, 1875 Italianate

- The LeDuc house at 604 W Central St is a simple square Italianate house - this one built in 1875. Like Cook-Rutledge it stands two stories with red brick walls on a stone foundation with a hip roof and eaves supported by paired brackets. Unlike Cook-Rutledge, it lacks quoins, the windows have round-arched tops sheltered by more elaborate hood mouldings, and an elaborate 5-sided bay windows faces Carson Street. An elaborate porch spans the facade, and a square wing extends from the back. This house had a square cupola on top, but it was removed in the 1930s. Elzear LeDuc was a bookkeeper for Chippewa Lumber and Boom Company. He and his wife Eleanor had ten children, so needed the large house, but it was started during the uncertain years following the Panic of 1873 and financial difficulties delayed its completion for over five years. The LeDucs and their descendants lived in the house for over a century.

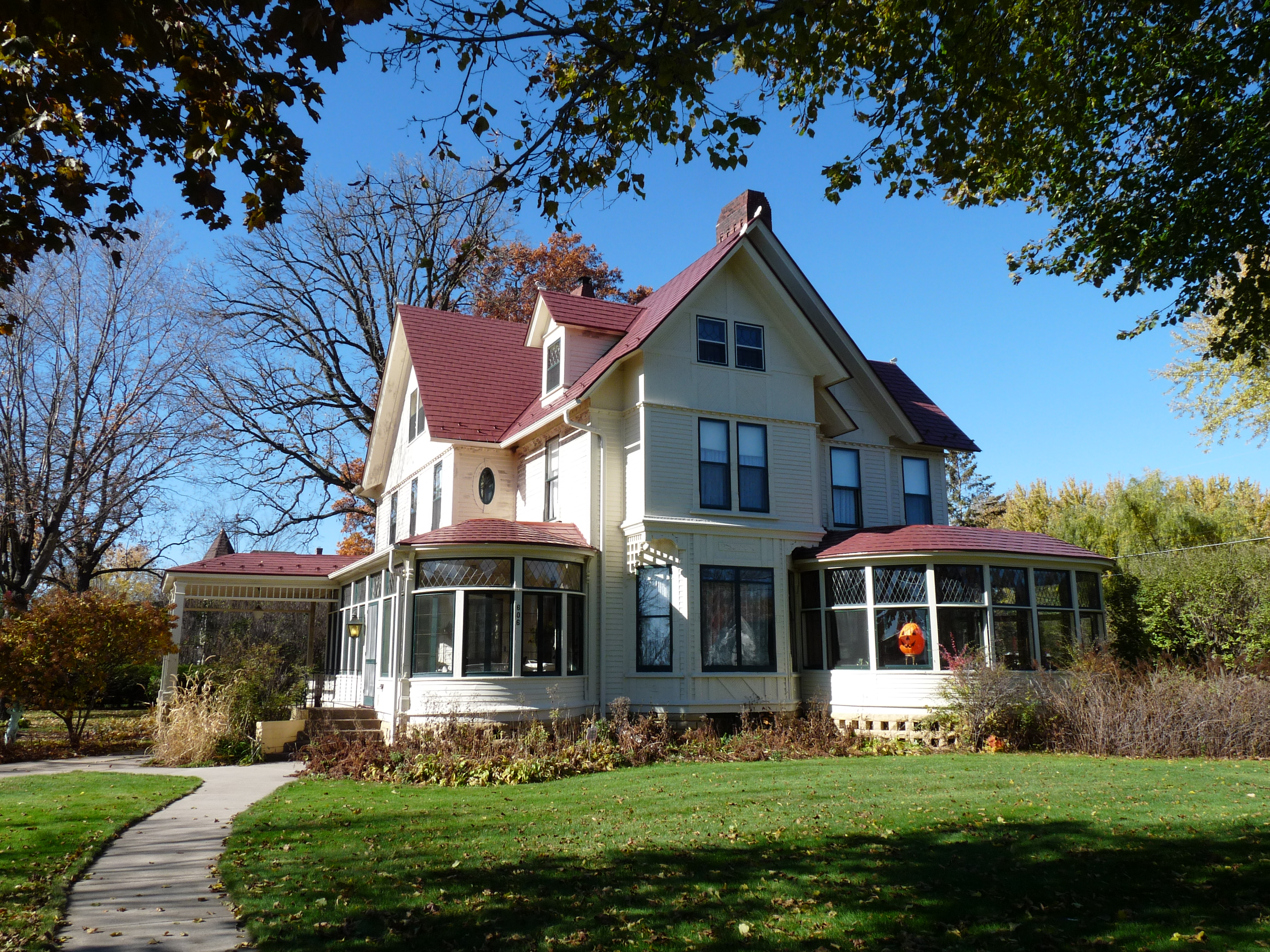
Irvine house, 1885 Queen Anne/Stick style

- The Irvine house at 606 Superior St is a 2.5-story Queen Anne-style house built in 1885, making it a fairly early Queen Anne. Typical of the style, it has a complex roof, asymmetric porches, prominent chimneys, and a variety of surface textures. Where many Queen Annes would have shingles in the gable ends, this house has "stickwork" boards framing narrow boards running at diagonals - an unusual texture. This house also has a porte-cochère. The diamond-pane leaded glass windows in the porches were added after the turn of the century.
  William Irvine's career touches on many aspects of the logging boom that built Chippewa Falls. In 1866 at age 14 he started working with his brother-in-law as a raftsman for Pound, Halbert & Company - i.e. guiding rafts of sawed logs from the sawmill that stood where Duncan Creek meets the Chippewa River downstream to places like Reads Landing, where the Chippewa joins the Mississippi. He worked at other jobs in the company: watchman, log scaler, and clerk. In 1869 Pound/Halbert was reorganized as the Union Lumber Company. When Union Lumber failed after the Panic of 1873 and was reorganized, William became a sales manager. After it became Chippewa Lumber and Boom Company and Frederick Weyerhauser took it over in 1881, William was promoted to secretary, and in 1885 to general manager. He managed the large company from the burning and rebuilding of its huge mill in 1886 to its closing in 1911, when the stands of white pine upstream were dwindling. "Irvine is credited with prolonging the life of the Chippewa Falls sawmill by at least five years through his insistence, over stockholders' opposition, of the purchase of the Manitowish tract of timber." He also served as vice-president of Lumberman's National Bank and on the board of the Wisconsin Central Railroad. In later years he arranged gifts of 237 acres from Chippewa Lumber and Boom to the city for a park and he and his wife Adelaide added personal donations. That park is now Irvine Park.

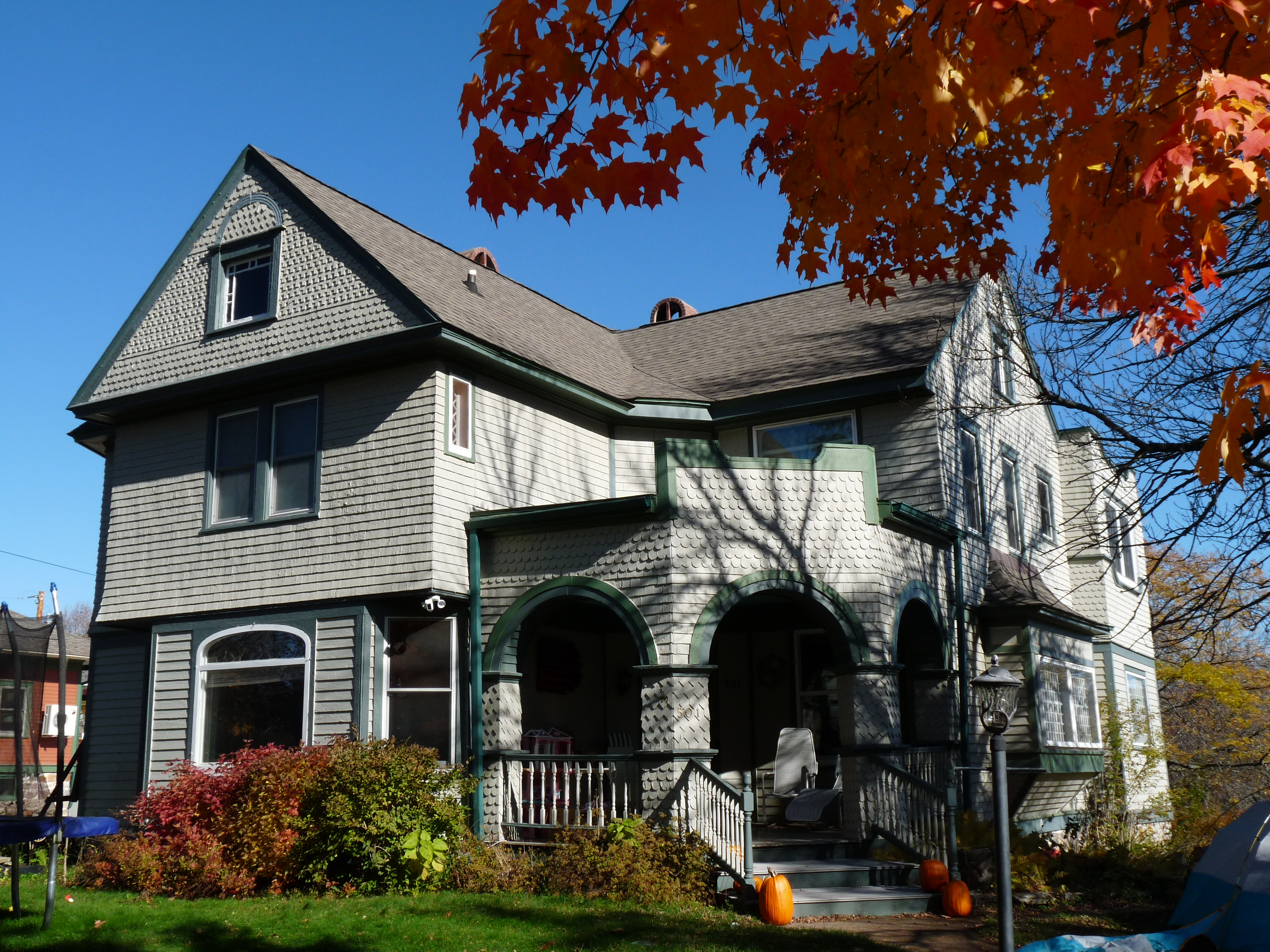
Hayes house, 1893 Shingle style

- The Dr. C.A. Hayes house at 501 N Superior St is a Shingle style house built in 1893. The hallmark of this style is the extensive wood shingles covering the second story and attic walls. The gable end facing Superior Street has three different patterns: fishscale, diamond, and a battlement pattern. The shingles wrap most corners smoothly without trim cornerboards. The house also has an interesting 3-sided entry porch, panels of stained glass in some windows, and decorative chimneys topped with brick arches.

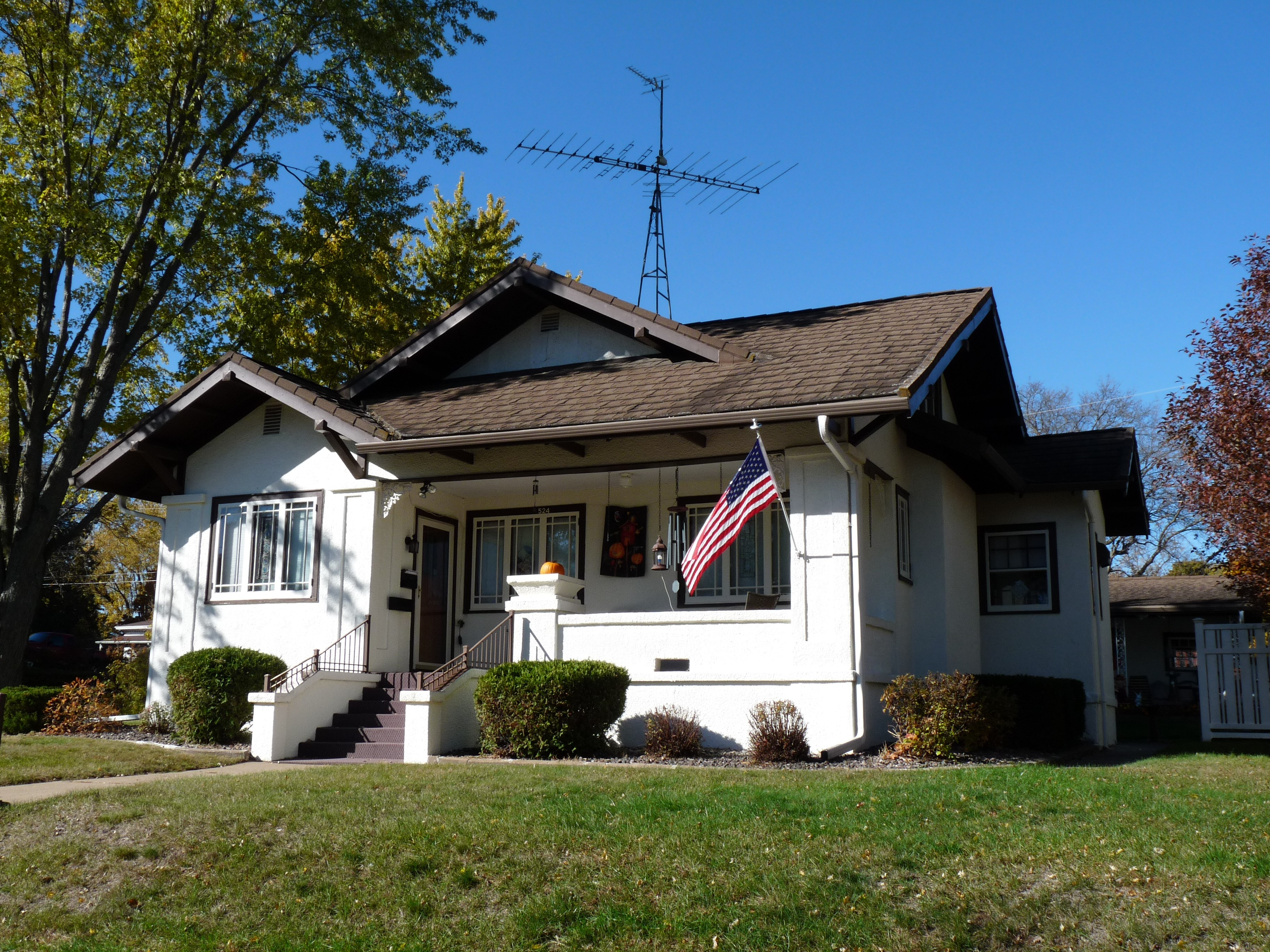
Sundet house, 1915 bungalow with Prairie Style influence

- The Sundet house at 524 W Central St is a 1.5-story bungalow with Prairie Style elements, built in 1915 yet very intact. The house has a complex roof, stucco-clad walls with abstracted pilasters at the front corners, and an open front porch. Prairie elements are the broad eaves that emphasize the horizontal and the banded windows. Christopher and Helena Sundet immigrated from Norway in the 1880s. He owned a music store at 318 N. Bridge St that "sold pianos, musical merchandise, and 'talking machines'."
- The Henry and Marie Brynelson house at 707 W. Columbia St was built in 1920, designed by Fallows, Huey & Macomber of Minneapolis. It combines Prairie Style's strong horizontal emphasis in the low hip roof, the wide eaves, and the string course and windows - with the Classical Revival portico with Tuscan columns supporting an entablature. Henry was the VP and manager of the Hand Made Shoe Co.
- The Julie Dierkin house at 724 W Dover St was built in 1923 - a 1.5 story Craftsman-style bungalow. Hallmarks of the Craftsman style in this building are the exposed rafter tails and the knee brackets under the eaves. This house also has a full-width front porch and a rectangular bay window. Its walls are clad in shingles.
- The John Myrman house at 704 W. Dover St is a 2-story American Foursquare-style house built in 1925. The hallmark of this style is the cube-shaped massing of the two-story house, usually with a hip roof. This house is clad in red brick, with a sun room on the side, and with a hip-roofed front porch supported by tapered square columns on brick bases.

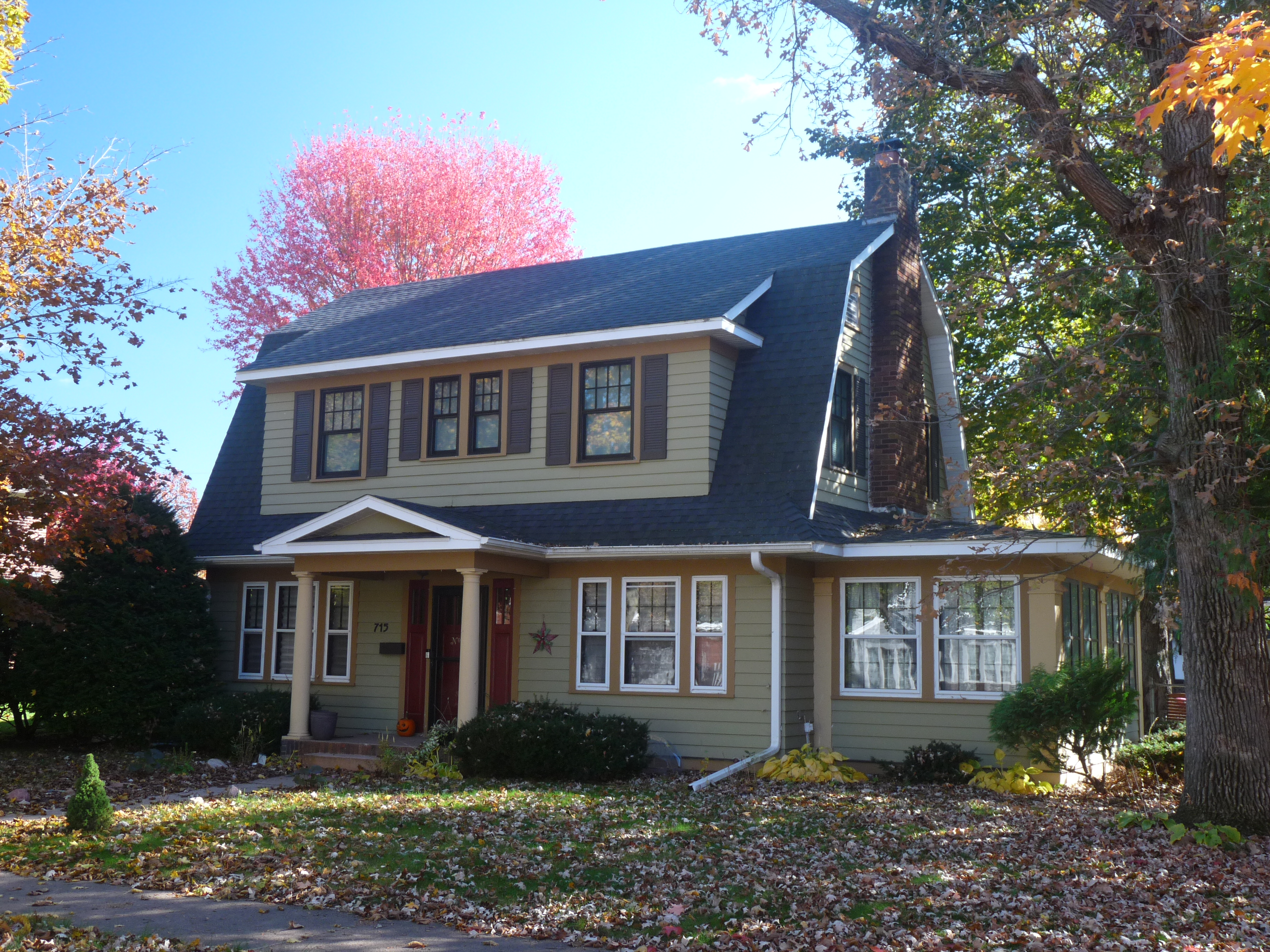
Paquette house, 1925 Dutch Colonial Revival

- The Paquette house at 715 W Dover St is a Dutch Colonial Revival-style house built in 1925. The hallmark of this style is the gambrel (barn-like) roof. The Colonial Revival elements on this house are the front door with sidelights, sheltered by a porch with Tuscan columns supporting a pedimented roof. At the end is a sunroom with its corners supported by pilasters.

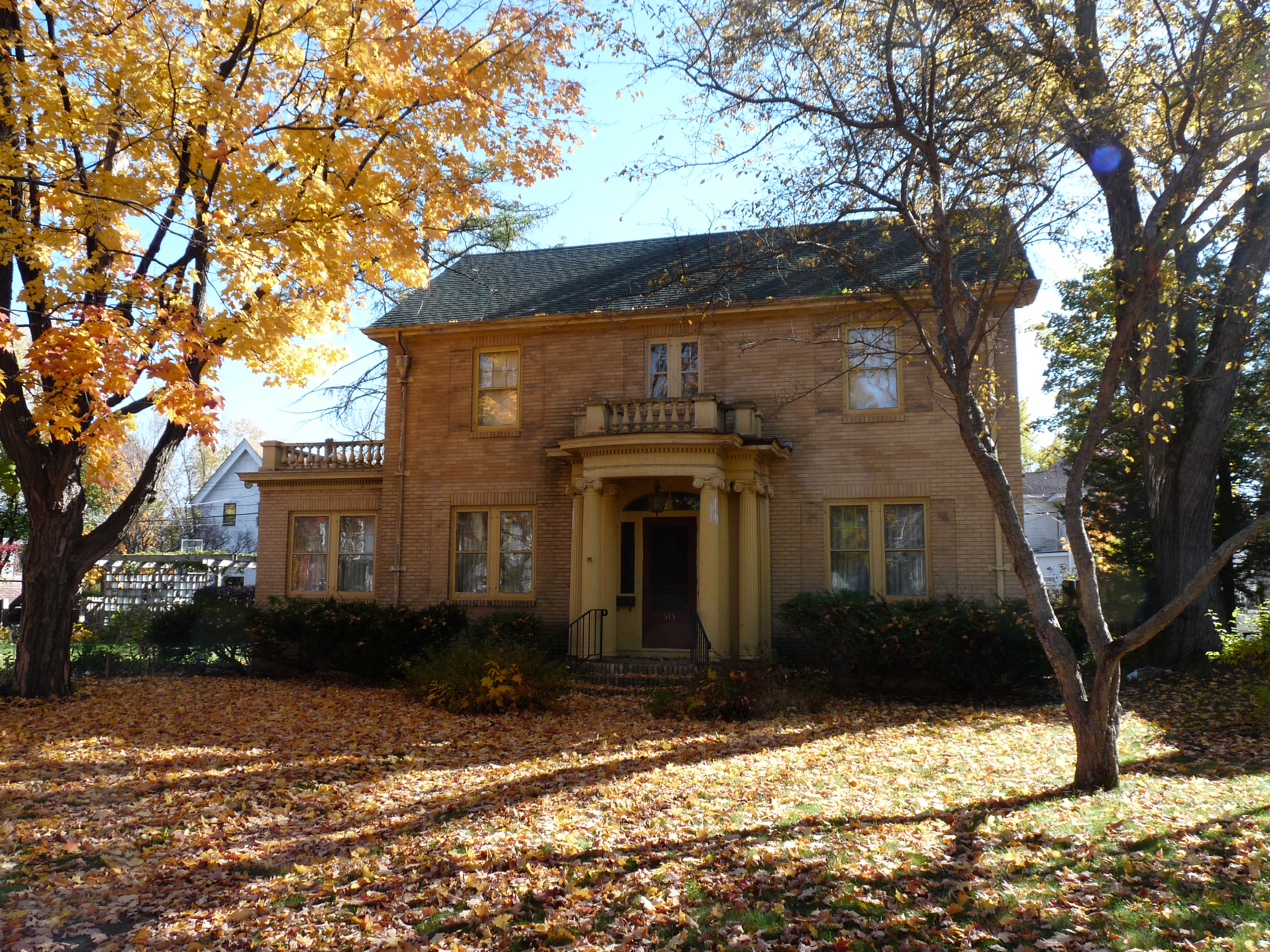
Stiels house, 1928 Colonial Revival

- The C.E. Stiels house at 515 W Dover St is a Colonial Revival-style house built in 1928. Hallmarks of this style are the symmetry of the front and the sidelights and fanlight above the front door. The door is also framed by an elaborate portico of fluted Ionic columns supporting a denticulated entablature capped with a classical balustrade. This house has a sunroom on one side, and half-round windows and cornice returns on the gable ends. C.E. ran an insurance agency. The Lebeis house up the street at 715 W Dover a simpler version, in darker brick.

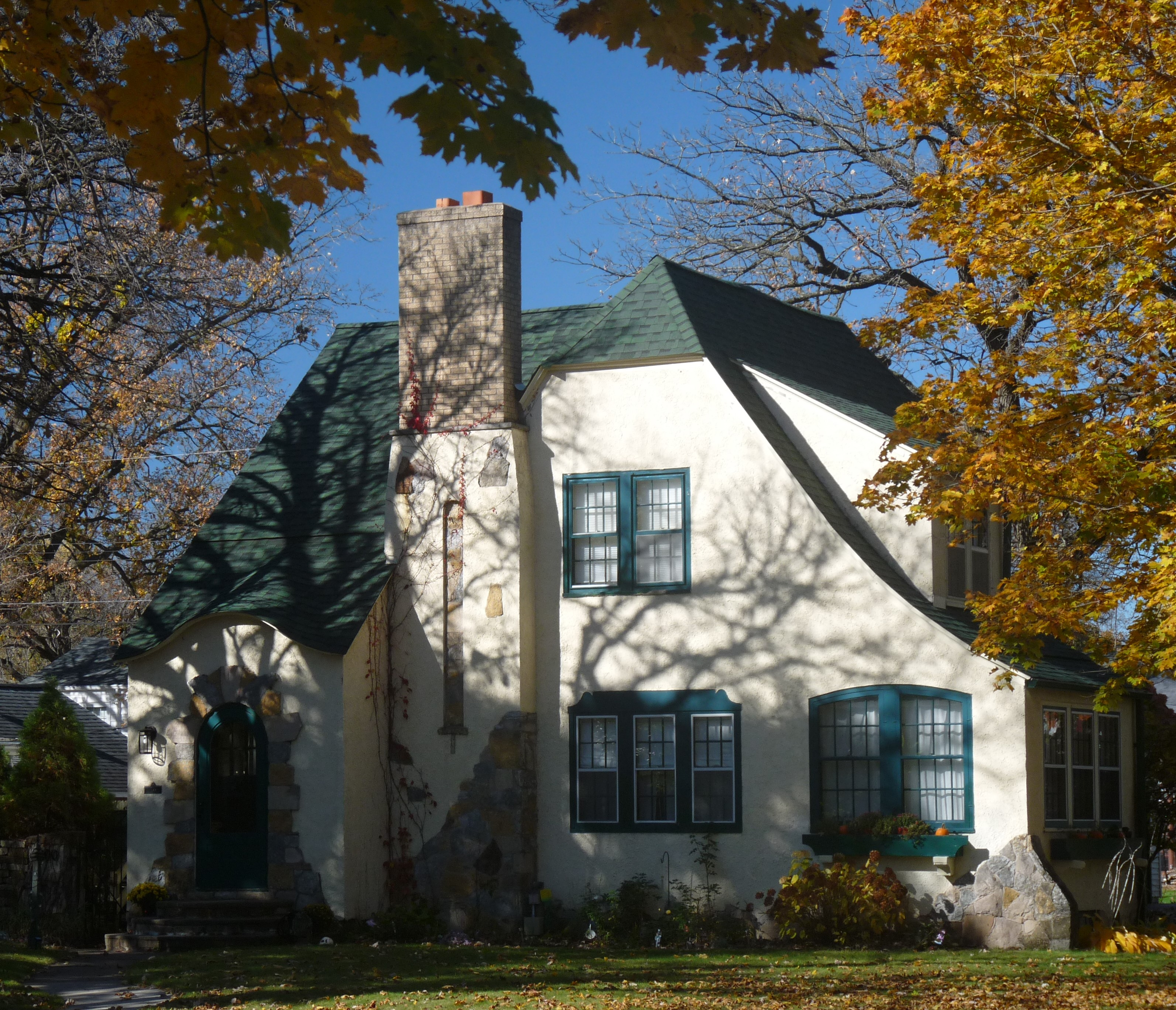
Shea house, 1929 Tudor Revival

- The Joseph and Marieau Shea house at 800 W. Dover St is a Tudor Revival-style house built in 1929. Hallmarks of this style are the steep roof, the prominent chimney, and the rough decorative stonework. This house has a complex roof with some curved sections. The walls are clad in stucco. Joseph was a traveling salesman. The G.W. Knight house just up the street at 710 W Dover is an example of Tudor Revival style clad in clapboard, built in 1927.

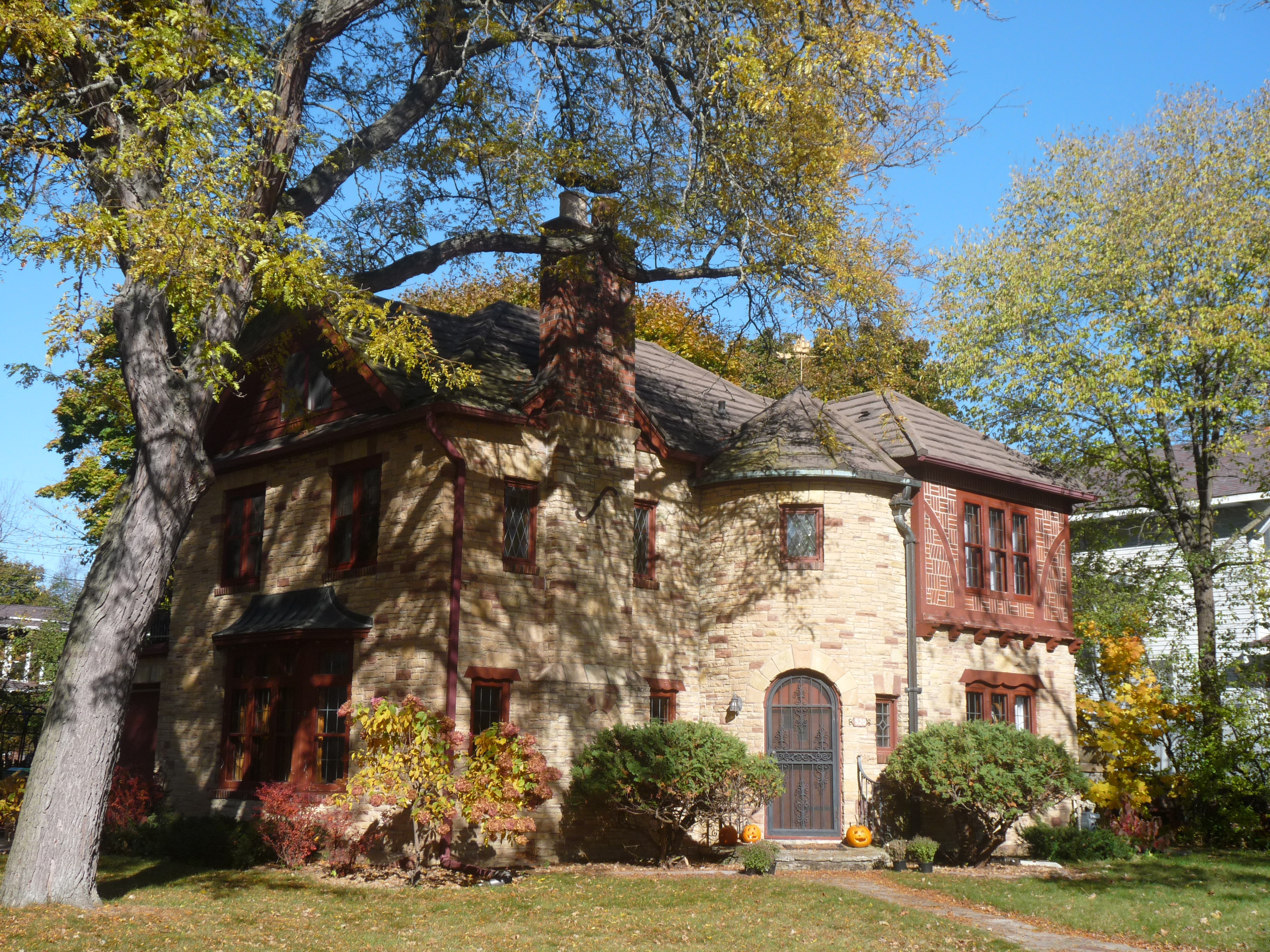
Roerick house, 1935 French Provincial style

- The Robert and Marguerite Roerick house at 520 W. Grand Ave. is a French Provincial-style house built in 1935. The house has an L-shaped floorplan, with a round tower inside the L. The arched front door opens into the tower. A large chimney is prominent, with pots at the top. The roof is complex and covered in tile. Walls are clad in rough stone except the second story of one wing which is half-timbered. Robert was a salesman and manager for the J.C. Penney store in town.
- The ranch house at 504 Superior, overlooking the corner of Superior and Willow streets, was built in 1951. It is one story with an L-shaped footprint, clad in brick with picture windows.
