= Sheeley =

Sheeley may refer to:

- Sharon Sheeley, American songwriter
- James Sheeley House, Italianate building in Chippewa Falls, Wisconsin
- Sheeley Mountain, mountain in Fulton County, New York

== See also ==
- Shelley (disambiguation)
