= George V. Siegner House =

Historic house in Wisconsin, United States

- U.S. National Register of Historic Places
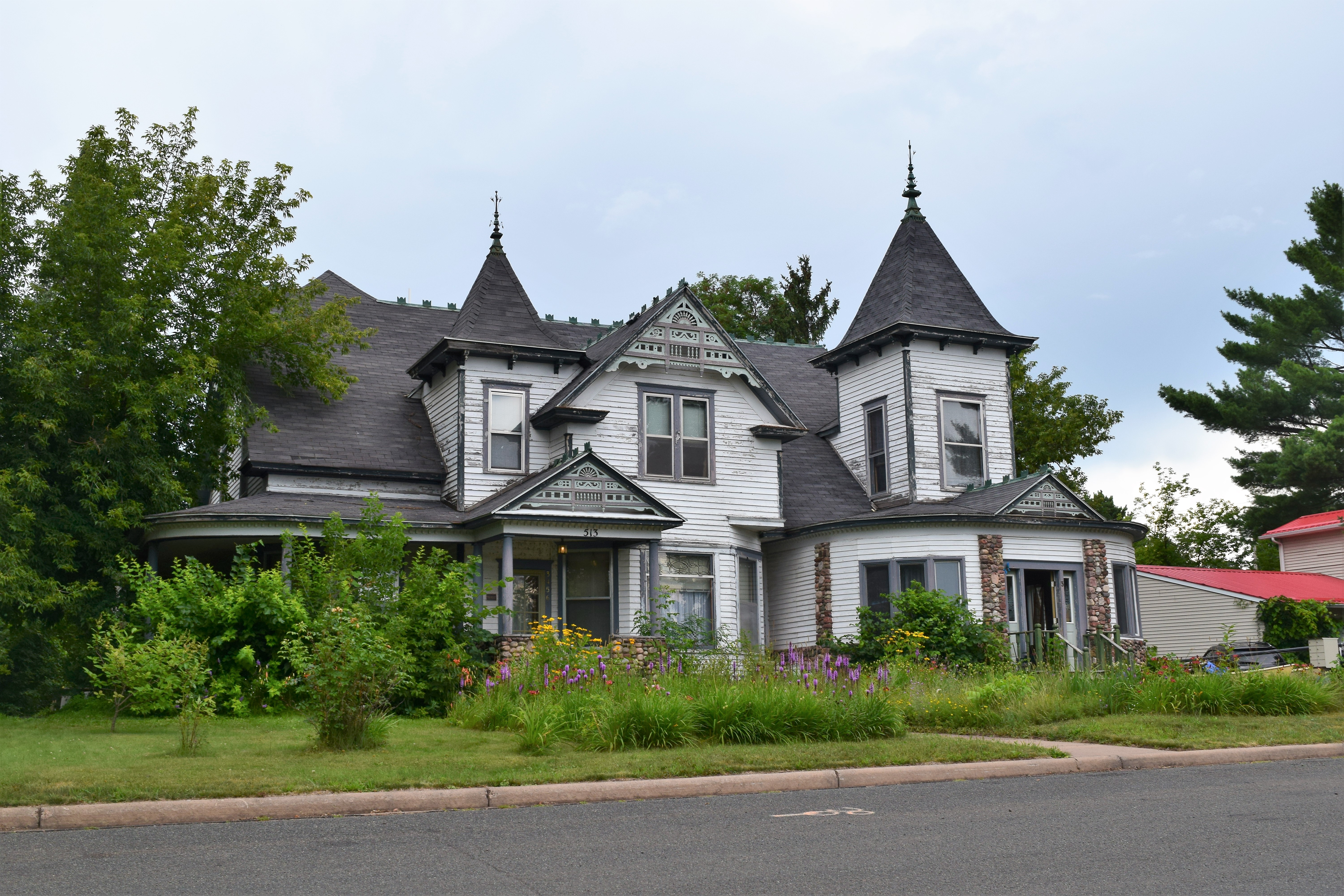
- Location: 513 Dale St., Spooner, Wisconsin
- Coordinates: 45°49′43″N 91°53′36″W
- Area: less than one acre
- Built: 1904
- Architectural style: Queen Anne
- NRHP reference No.: 82000716
- Added to NRHP: March 1, 1982

The George V. Siegner House is a historic house at 513 Dale Street in Spooner, Wisconsin. The house was built in 1904 for businessman George V. Siegner, owner of the local Big C.O.D. Bee Hive Department Store. Siegner, who moved to the area in 1893, was so successful that he became both the richest man in Washburn County and one of its largest landowners. The Queen Anne house, a later example of the style, is one of the few homes in the city with a formal design. The house features gables with decorative woodwork, two square towers with finials at their peaks, and wraparound porches at both front entrances.

The house was added to the National Register of Historic Places on March 1, 1982.
