= Burnett County Abstract Company =

- U.S. National Register of Historic Places
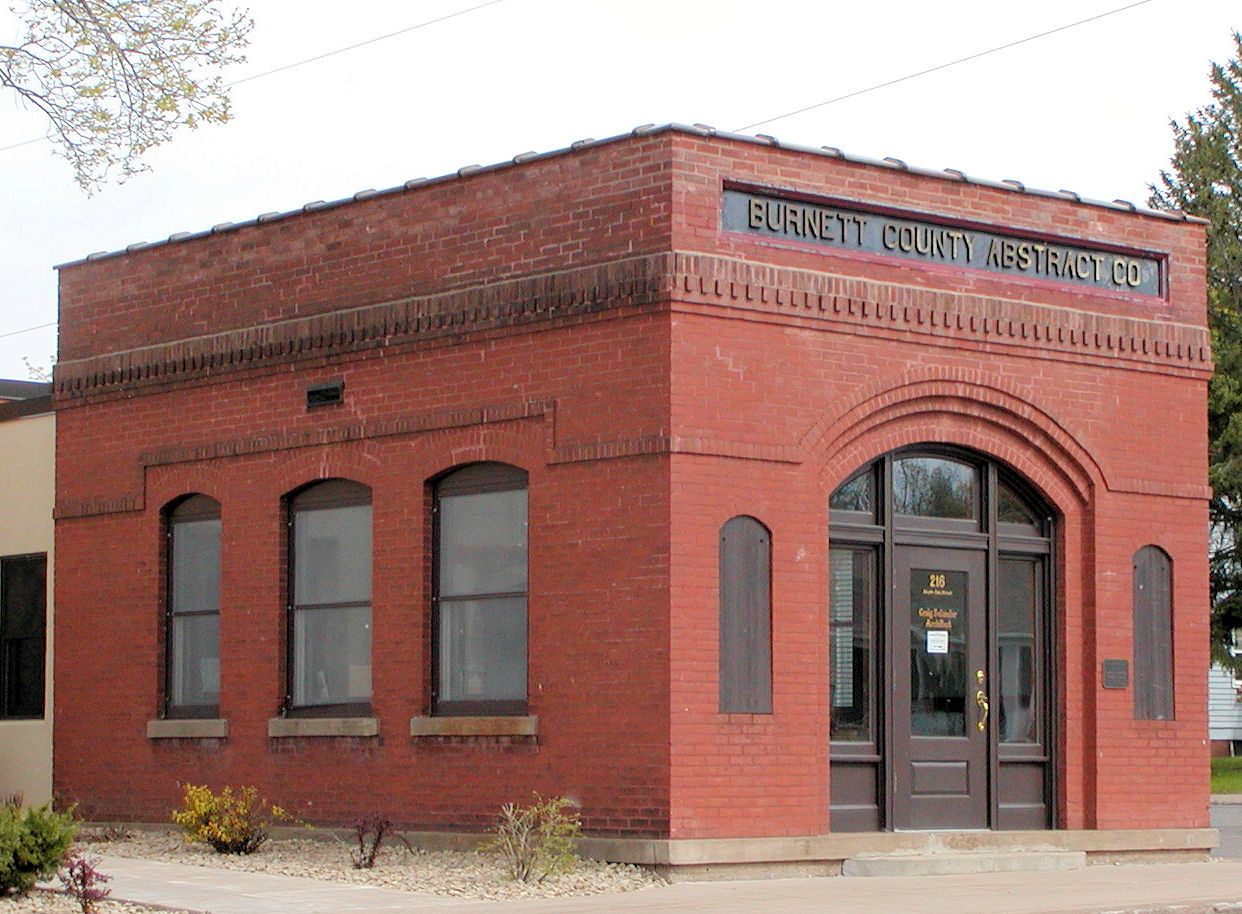
- Burnett County Abstract Company
- Location: 214 N. Oak St. Grantsburg, Wisconsin
- Coordinates: 45.77765°N 92.6839°W
- NRHP reference No.: 80000109
- Added to NRHP: May 7, 1980

Burnett County Abstract Company is a real estate services company providing full title, escrow, and closing services in Burnett County, Wisconsin. It is located in Siren.

The company was founded in 1906 in Grantsburg by six citizens of that town. Its historic Grantsburg building, completed in 1908, was added to the National Register of Historic Places in 1980.
