= Sandrock Cliffs =

- U.S. National Register of Historic Places
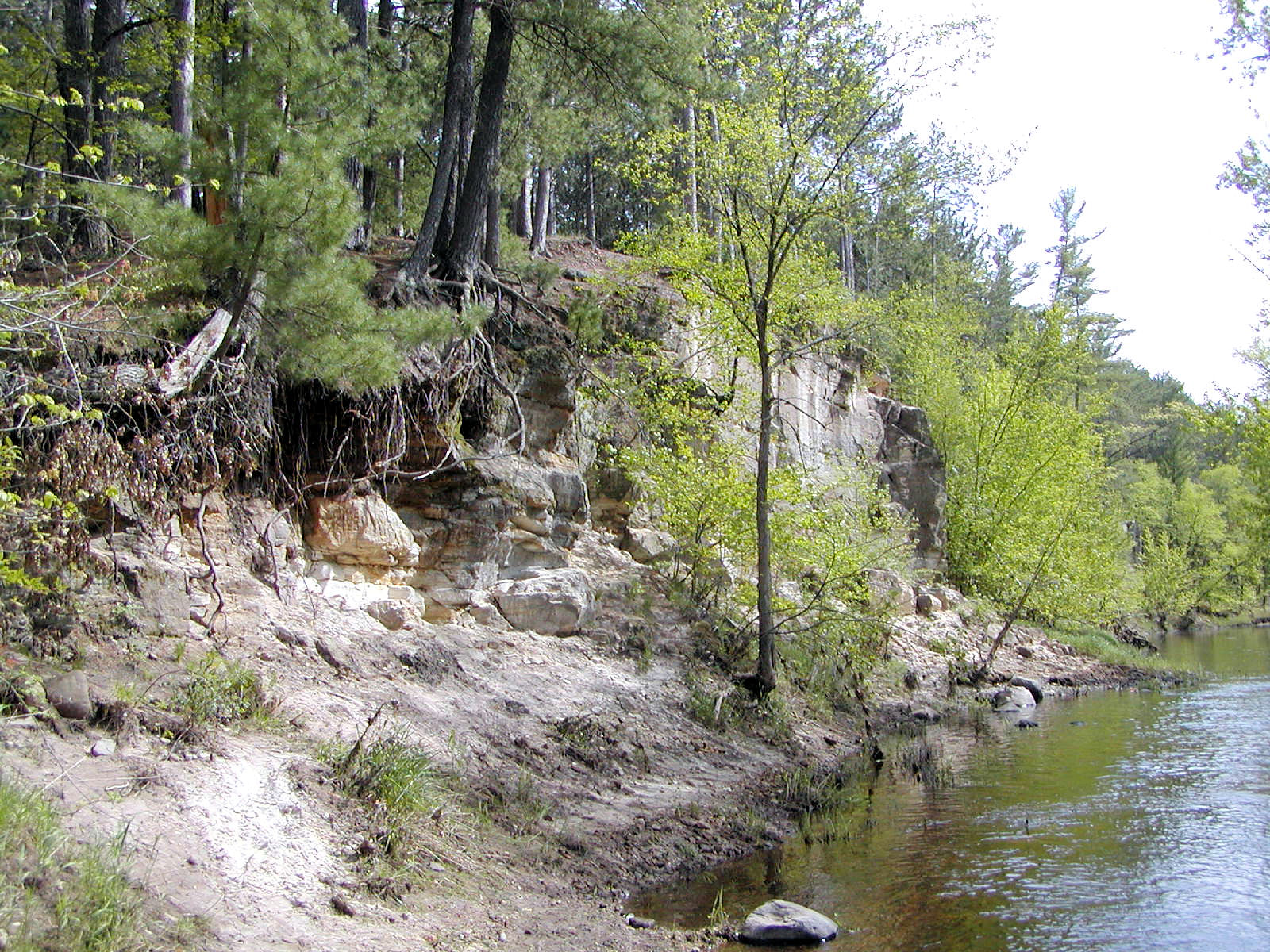
- Sandrock Cliffs

- Location within Wisconsin Location within the United States
- Nearest city: Grantsburg, Wisconsin
- Coordinates: 45°47′37″N 92°46′11″W
- Area: 2.6 acres (1.1 ha)
- NRHP reference No.: 90000632
- Added to NRHP: May 1, 1990

The Sandrock Cliffs are located in Burnett County, Wisconsin.

== History ==
The cliffs are remnants of the retreating Cambrian sea-left deep sandstone which was carved by glacial meltwater, revealing cliffs revered by indigenous people. In 1990, the site was added to the National Register of Historic Places.
