= State Bank of Ladysmith =

- U.S. National Register of Historic Places
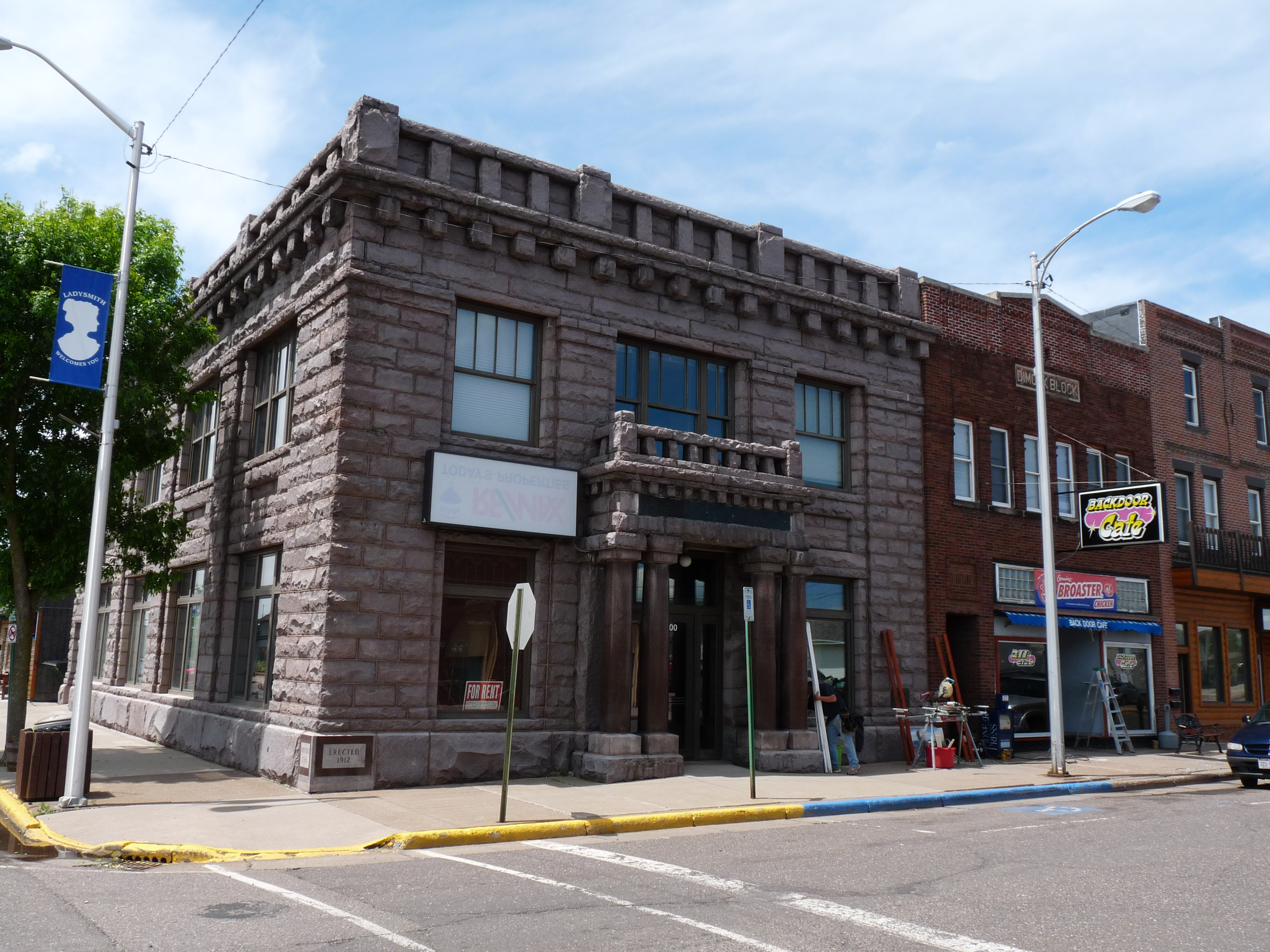
- Location: 102 W. 2nd St., Ladysmith, Wisconsin
- Coordinates: 45°27′51.8″N 91°06′08.4″W
- Area: 0.1 acres (0.040 ha)
- Built: 1912
- Built by: W.E. Maddux Contractors
- Architectural style: Neoclassical
- NRHP reference No.: 80000192
- Added to NRHP: January 17, 1980

The State Bank of Ladysmith is a historic bank building at 102 W. 2nd Street in Ladysmith, Wisconsin. The building was constructed in 1912 as a permanent home for the State Bank of Ladysmith. The two-story granite-faced building has a Neoclassical design. It is listed on the National Register of Historic Places.

== History ==
The State Bank of Ladysmith was established in 1903, shortly after a new lumber mill brought population and economic growth to Ladysmith. In 1912, the bank, wanting a permanent home, had a two-story building constructed. The bank operated on the first floor of the building and rented the second floor as office space; while it originally housed two lumber companies, most of the second floor's occupants through the years were attorneys and doctors. Upon its opening, the new building was praised by local newspapers, with the Ladysmith News-Budget calling it "the finest business structure in the city, with no exception." After the State Bank closed, the Pioneer Bank occupied the building from 1927 to 1964. The building was listed on the National Register of Historic Places on January 17, 1980.

== Architecture ==
The W.E. Maddux contractors designed the Neoclassical building. The two street-facing sides of the building are faced with ashlar-cut red granite, which was quarried at Lohrville but cut at the construction site because of a quarry strike. A portico surrounds the front entrance, with two polished granite columns on either side and dentillation and a balcony on top. The portico originally included a carved panel above the door as well, though it has since been removed. The building's cornice is also dentillated, and a parapet runs along the street-facing sides of the roof.
