= Flambeau Mission Church =

Historic church in Wisconsin, United States

- U.S. National Register of Historic Places
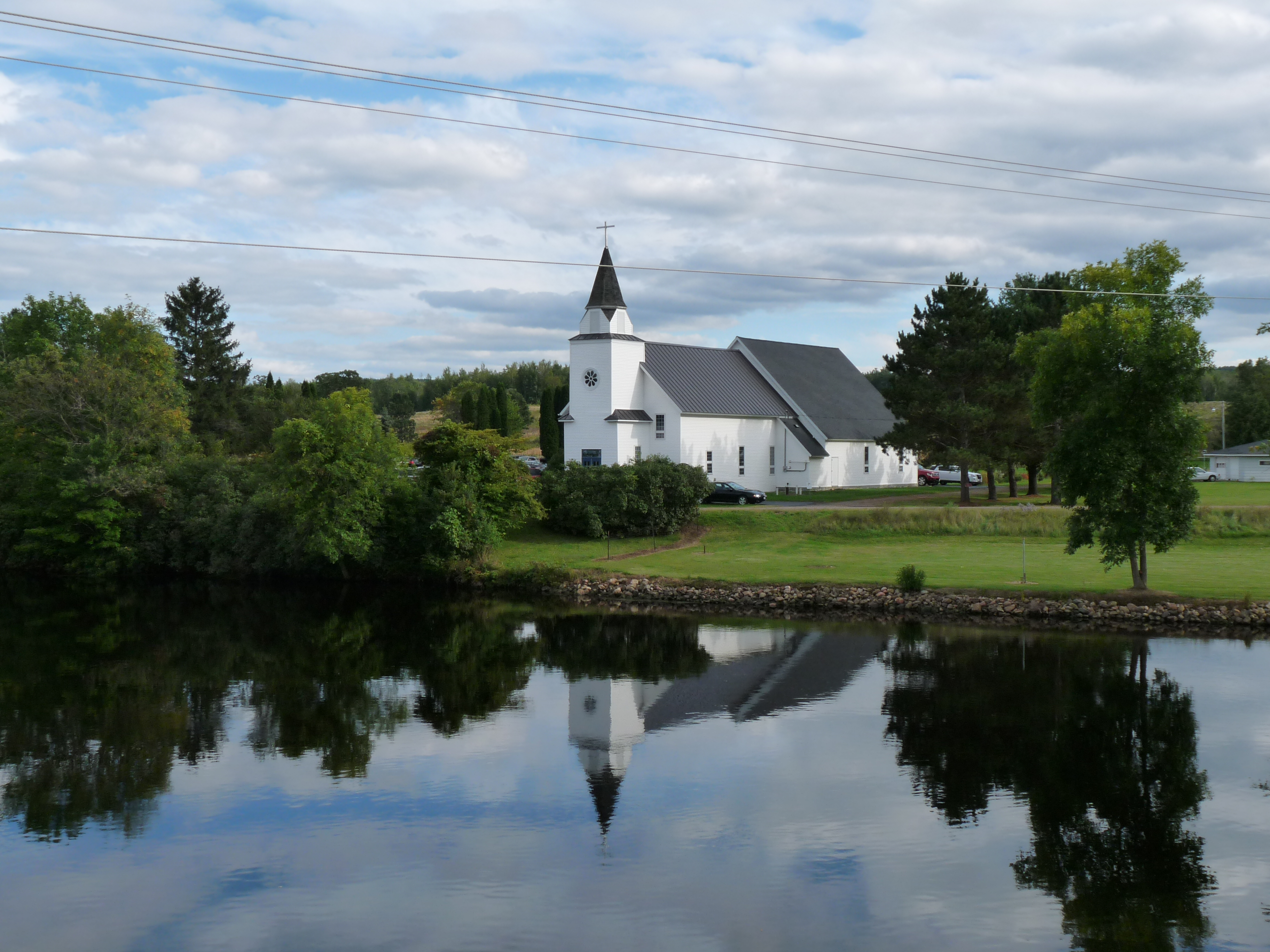

- Location within Wisconsin Location within the United States
- Nearest city: Ladysmith, Wisconsin
- Coordinates: 45°18′8″N 91°11′55″W
- Area: 1 acre (0.40 ha)
- Built: 1884
- Built by: Thomas Orthman
- NRHP reference No.: 79000113
- Added to NRHP: August 7, 1979

The Flambeau Mission Church (also known as St. Francis of Assisi Mission Church) is a historic church south of Ladysmith, Wisconsin, United States. The church was the first church in Rusk County, built just below the junction of the Chippewa and Flambeau Rivers in 1882 to serve the French and Indian community called Flambeau Farms. It was added to the National Register of Historic Places in 1979.

In the later 1800s, logging and log-driving made the Flambeau and Chippewa rivers a busy place. White settlement began around 1847 and by 1864 the Daniel Shaw Lumber Company had established a farm near the junction of the rivers to supply its logging operations. In addition to river traffic, the stagecoach line from Chippewa Falls into the logging frontier also stopped at Shaw's farm.

A mile and a half to the east, a village of Chippewa Indians had taken root on the south bank of the river. Franciscan missionaries visited the village and around 1881 they built a simple mission church facing the river, with local carpenter Thomas Orthman and other residents working under the direction of Father Chrysostom Verwyst and Father Casimir. In back was a one-story priest's quarters. In 1884 a 2-story annex was added, intended as a monastery but never used for that purpose. The bell tower was added in 1903.

The Chippewa community had about 70 confirmed members at the 1881 dedication of the church. This was around the peak of pine logging, and the Flambeau settlement had about 11 saloons. With the passing of logging, all of this has faded. The church is the only building surviving from the little logging community.
