= Island of Happy Days =

Historic estate in Wisconsin, United States

- U.S. National Register of Historic Places
- U.S. Historic district
- Location within Wisconsin Location within the United States
- Location: Stout Island, Red Cedar Lake, Cedar Lake, Wisconsin
- Coordinates: 45°36′39″N 91°35′16″W
- Area: 9 acres (3.6 ha)
- Built: 1909–11
- Architect: Arthur Heun
- Architectural style: Rustic Style
- NRHP reference No.: 95000141
- Added to NRHP: February 24, 1995

The Island of Happy Days is a historic estate located on Stout Island in Red Cedar Lake, Barron County, Wisconsin. Built from 1909 to 1911, the estate was a summer home for the family of Frank Deming Stout, heir to the Knapp, Stout & Co. fortune. The estate was designed by Arthur Heun in a rustic style resembling Adirondack resorts. Stout and his family visited the home until Stout's death in 1927; he called it "the dearest place on earth". The home is now a resort called Stout's Island Lodge.

The Island of Happy Days was added to the National Register of Historic Places on February 24, 1995.
