= L.I. Roe House =

Historic house in Wisconsin, United States

- U.S. National Register of Historic Places
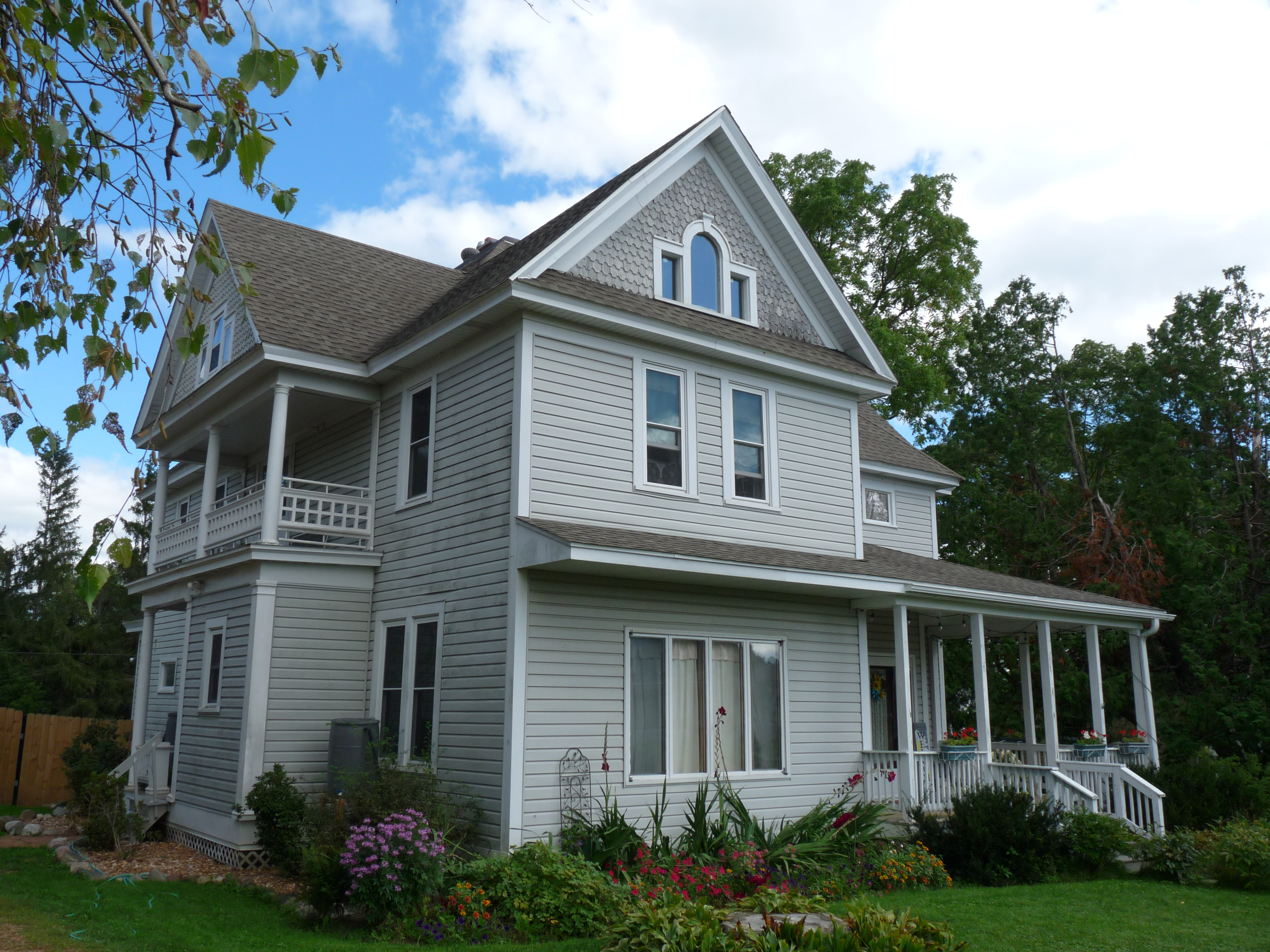
- Location: 410 N. Franklin St., Stanley, Wisconsin
- Coordinates: 44°57′48″N 90°55′53″W
- Area: 0.7 acres (0.28 ha)
- Built: 1892, 1906
- Architectural style: Colonial Revival
- NRHP reference No.: 80000112
- Added to NRHP: August 27, 1980

The L.I. Roe House is located in Stanley, Wisconsin.

== History ==
The house was originally built in 1892 and expanded in 1906. Norwegian immigrant Roe was a clerk in the Northwestern Lumber Company's store, president of the school board, first president of the Citizen's State Bank, and ran a wood products factory.

It was listed on the National Register of Historic Places in 1980 and on the State Register of Historic Places in 1989.
