= St. Mary's Rectory (Cumberland, Wisconsin) =

- U.S. National Register of Historic Places
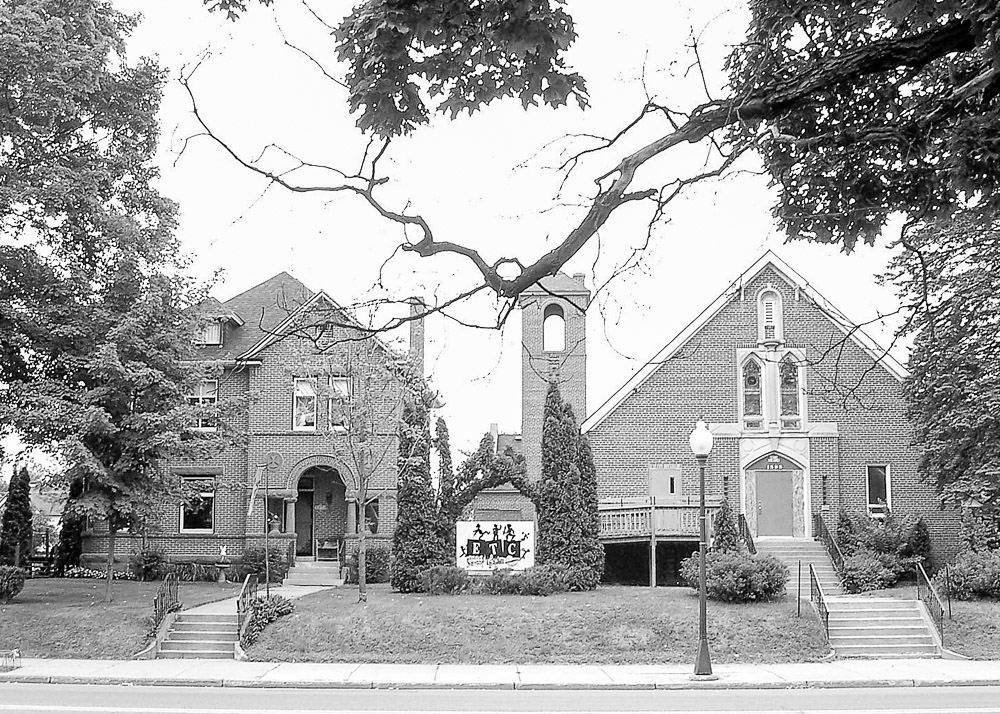
- Former St. Mary's Rectory and Church
- Location: 1575 Second Ave; Cumberland, Wisconsin
- Coordinates: 45.538611°N 92.022500°W
- Built: 1904
- Architectural style: Queen Anne
- NRHP reference No.: 11000152
- Added to NRHP: April 4, 2011

The St. Mary's Rectory in Cumberland, Wisconsin, also referred to as its address, 1575 Second Avenue, is a former Roman Catholic rectory. It was built in 1904 and attached to the parish of St. Mary's of the Wayside, which merged with St. Anthony Abbot in 1973.

The rectory was added to the National Register of Historic Places in 2011. Additionally, it is listed on the Wisconsin State Register of Historic Places.

== History ==
The rectory was built for the Reverend Dr. Stephen Leinfelder, who was the youngest American to hold degrees in both philosophy and theology. It remained church property until it was sold in 1985, at which time it became a boarding house. The building was sold again in 1991 and was converted into a bed and breakfast by the new owners, named The Rectory. The owners later closed the bed and breakfast, and the building is now their private residence.
