= Berkshire Block =

- U.S. National Register of Historic Places
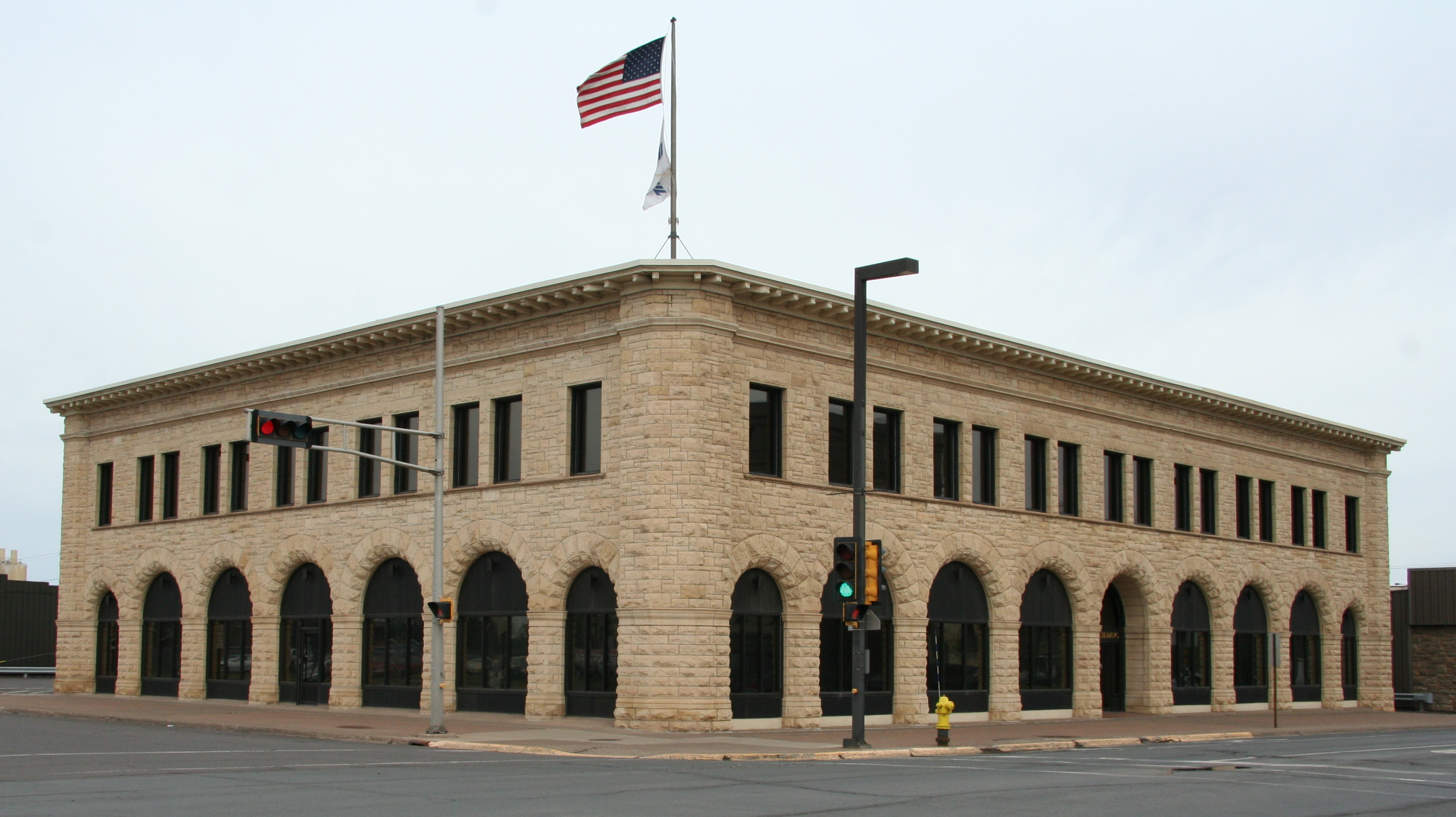
- Berkshire Block

- Location within Wisconsin Location within the United States
- Location: 917-927 Tower Ave., Superior, Wisconsin
- Coordinates: 46°43′37″N 92°06′15″W
- Area: less than one acre
- Built: 1892
- Architectural style: Richardsonian Romanesque
- MPS: Speculative Commercial Blocks of Superior's Boom Period 1888--1892 TR
- NRHP reference No.: 85001466
- Added to NRHP: June 27, 1985

The Berkshire Block is located in Superior, Wisconsin.

== History ==
The building originally housed a bank, followed by department stores and insurance company. Currently, it serves as the headquarters for Amsoil.
