= James Sheeley House =

- Sheeley House
- U.S. National Register of Historic Places
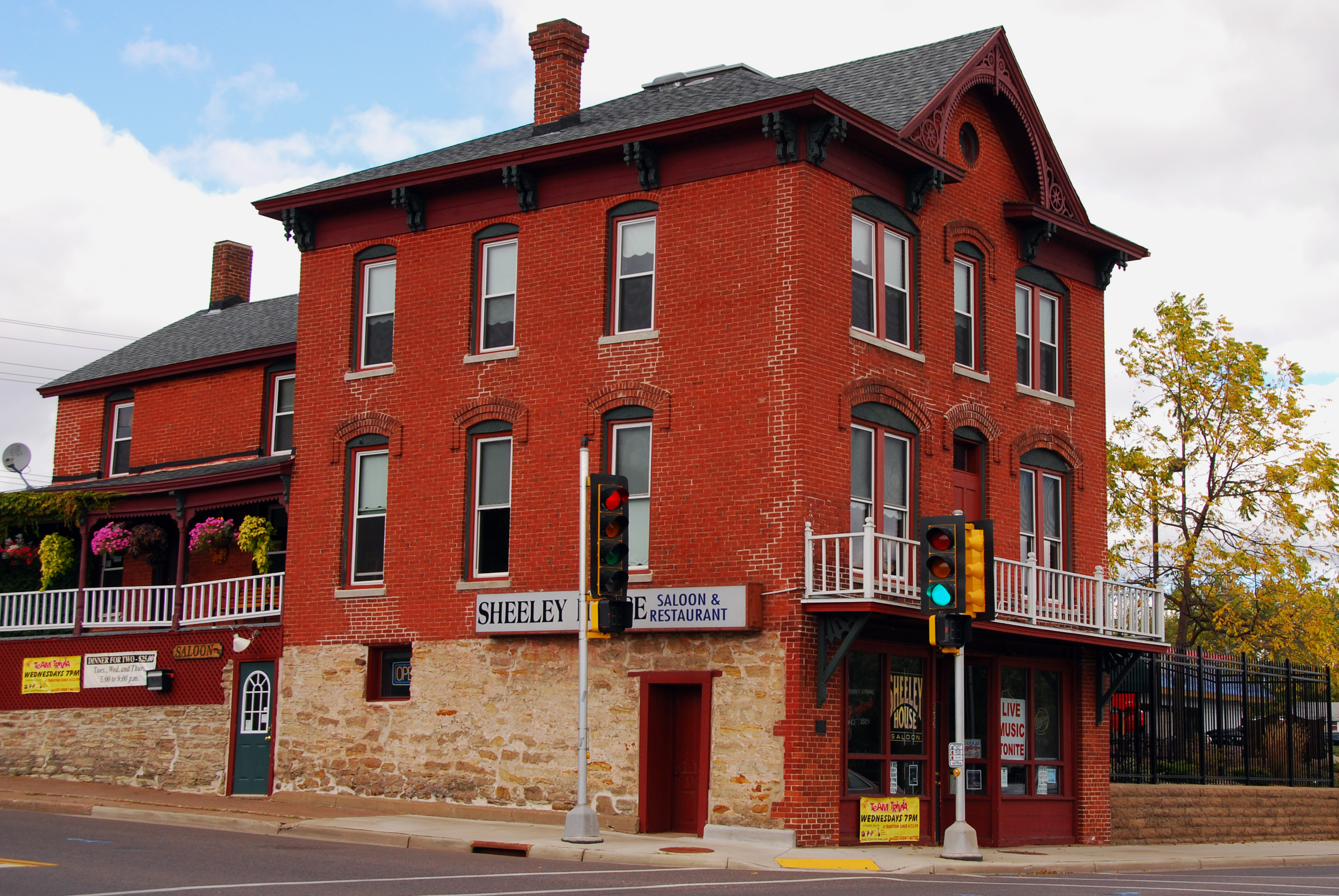

- Location within Wisconsin Location within the United States
- Location: Chippewa Falls, Wisconsin
- Coordinates: 44°55′59.556″N 91°23′38.3922″W
- Built: 1884
- Architectural style: Italianate
- NRHP reference No.: 85001949
- Added to NRHP: September 5, 1985

The James Sheeley House is an Italianate building in Chippewa Falls, Wisconsin, United States. Originally used as a boarding house, it is currently a restaurant.

== History ==
The history of the site began before the American Civil War when the first buildings were erected. In 1868 Carl Hering purchased the property and moved his family into the small house on River Street. Hering's carriage and blacksmith shop was located behind the house, facing Pine Street. John B. Paul, who operated a boarding house one block west of the Sheeley House, purchased the Hering property in 1884. He removed the small carriage shop and surfaced the entire building with local red brick. The Paul House had a ground floor saloon, first floor living quarters, a large kitchen, the boarders' dining room and second floor sleeping rooms.

James Sheeley, an Irish immigrant, stayed at the Paul House while working on the railroad from Wabasha, Minnesota to Chippewa Falls. In 1905 he and his wife, Kate, bought the property. James tended the bar; Kate and their children, Anna, William, and Howard, prepared meals and maintained the rooms. When James died in 1913, Kate continued to serve meals and rent rooms, but leased the saloon operation. Before the saloon closed in 1967, Frank "Frenchy" LaCour had tapped the "coldest beer in town" for 28 years. After Kate's death in 1934, Anna Sheeley no longer served food, but continued to rent rooms to boarders. By 1981 it was necessary for Anna Sheeley to leave her home of 76 years.

In 1981, although this once handsome building was greatly in need of repair and its purpose was obsolete, the Sheeley House was structurally sound. David and Sharon Raihle were able to visualize the restoration and save one of the last boarding houses in the Chippewa Valley. Using information and pictures from the Sheeley family, it was possible to determine the appearance of the original interior and exterior of the building. Meticulous care was taken to not only preserve the old, but to retain the function of the Sheeley House Restaurant and Saloon. Current owner Jim Bloms purchased the Sheeley House on August 23, 2001. Per local news in November 2013 and quoting the Sheeley house web site "The James Sheeley House will be closing its doors November 30th pending a change in ownership. All gift certificates must be redeemed by that date."

The Sheeley House Saloon was purchased April 1, 2016 by Jes and Brian Jensen.

== Architecture ==
The current Sheeley House began taking shape after the property was purchased by John B. Paul in 1884, who surfaced the building with local red brick. Extensive renovations began in 1981, restoring the original interior and exterior of the building from old photographs, duplicating new trim from existing samples, and a new cedar shingle roof installed. The metal ceiling and French tile floor in the bar are original. A new bar was built duplicating the bar in the Paul House Saloon picture.
