= Cook-Rutledge House =

Historic house in Wisconsin, United States

- U.S. National Register of Historic Places
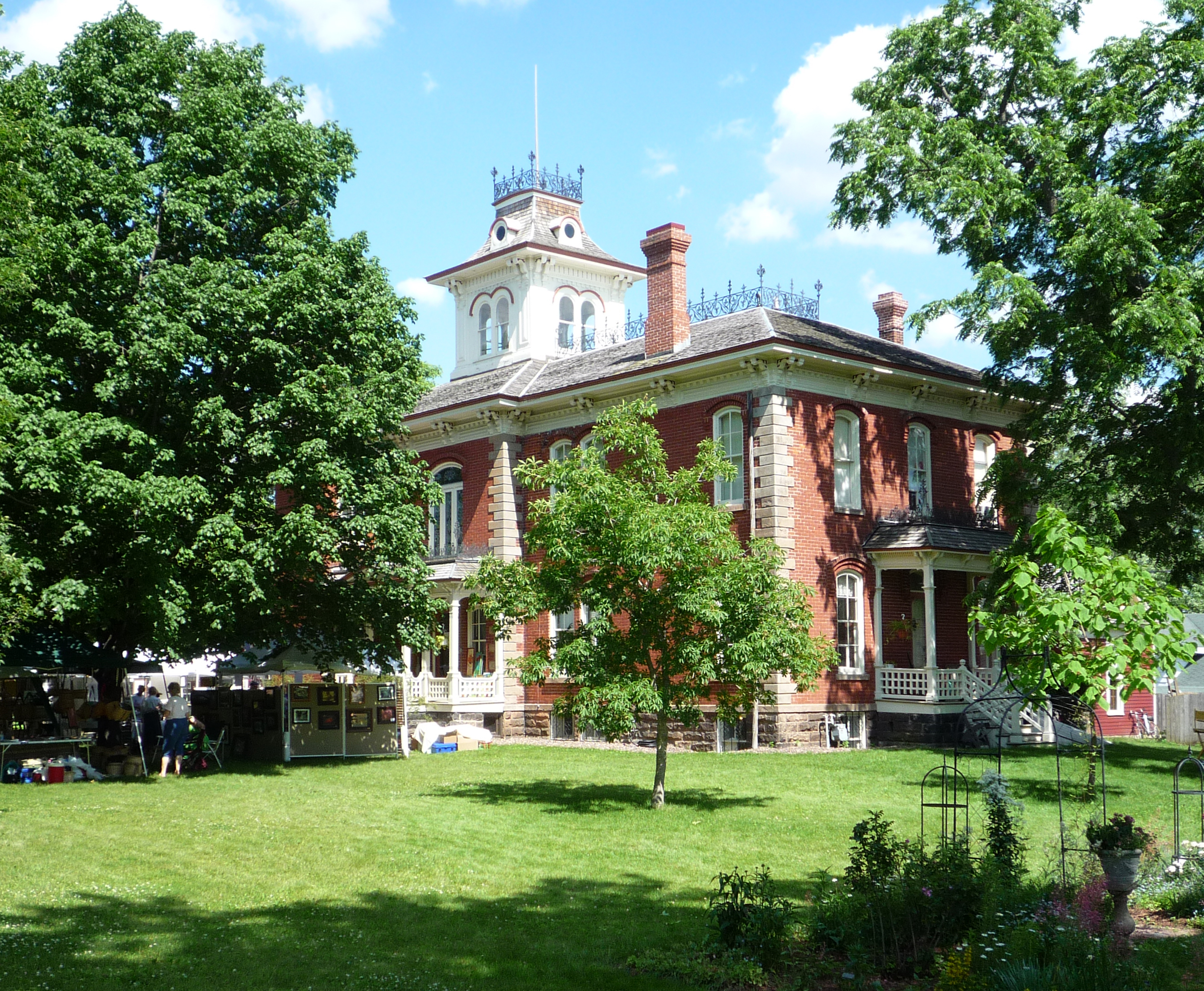

- Location within Wisconsin Location within the United States
- Interactive map showing the location for the Cook-Rutledge House
- Location: 505 W. Grand Ave. Chippewa Falls, Wisconsin
- Coordinates: 44°55′57″N 91°23′58″W
- Built: c. 1873
- Architectural style: Italianate
- NRHP reference No.: 74000060
- Added to NRHP: August 7, 1974

The Cook Rutledge House is a historic Italianate-style house located in Chippewa Falls, Wisconsin. It was added to the National Register of Historic Places in 1974.

== History ==
The house was built around 1873 by lawyer and future Lieutenant Governor of Wisconsin James M. Bingham and his wife, Justine.

After James's death, Justine sold the house in 1887 to Irish immigrant Edward Rutledge, vice-president of the Chippewa Lumber and Boom Company and an assistant to Frederick Weyerhaeuser. In 1888 Rutledge altered the mansion to its present appearance.

In 1915 the house was sold to Dayton E. Cook, a prominent lawyer and county judge. His family lived there for many years, finally selling the house to the Chippewa County Historical Society in 1973. The house serves as a museum. The site is also available to rent for special occasions.
