= Empire Block (Superior, Wisconsin) =

- U.S. National Register of Historic Places
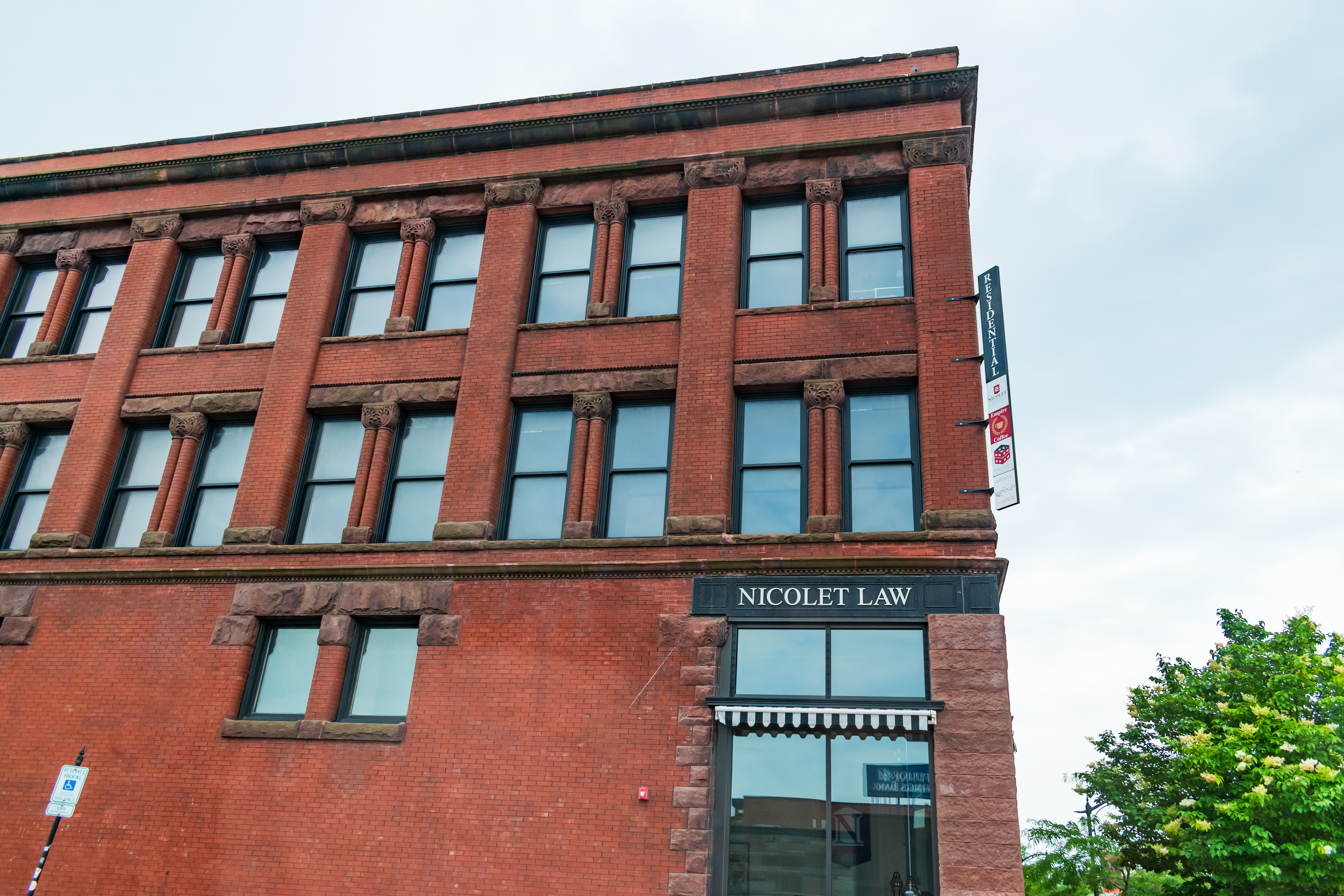
- Empire Block
- Location: 1202-1208 Tower Ave., Superior, Wisconsin
- Coordinates: 46°43′27″N 92°06′12″W
- Area: less than one acre
- Built: 1892
- Architect: Carl Wirth
- Architectural style: Romanesque Revival
- MPS: Speculative Commercial Blocks of Superior's Boom Period 1888--1892 TR
- NRHP reference No.: 85001467
- Added to NRHP: June 27, 1985

The Empire Block is located in Superior, Wisconsin.

== History ==
For roughly seventy years, a furniture store was located in the building. Other businesses housed within it include a pizzeria. The building was listed on the National Register of Historic Places in 1985 and the State Register of Historic Places in 1989.
