= National Register of Historic Places listings in Portage County, Wisconsin =

Location of Portage County in Wisconsin

This is a list of the National Register of Historic Places listings in Portage County, Wisconsin. It is intended to provide a comprehensive listing of entries in the National Register of Historic Places that are located in Portage County, Wisconsin. The locations of National Register properties for which the latitude and longitude coordinates are included below may be seen in a map.

There are 22 properties and districts listed on the National Register in the county.

This National Park Service list is complete through NPS recent listings posted August 28, 2026.

== Current listings ==
	Name on the Register	Image	Date listed	Location	City or town	Description
1	Clark Street-Main Street Historic District	Clark Street-Main Street Historic District	June 7, 2021 (#100006599)	Roughly bounded by Prentice, Clark, Freemont, and Main Sts. 44°31′23″N 89°34′20″W	Stevens Point	Upscale neighborhood east of the downtown, including for example the 1876 Italianate-style McGlachlin house, the 1885 Second Empire-style Moen house, the 1886 Queen Anne-style Scott house, the 1913 American Foursquare Atwell house, the 1915 Craftsman Cashin house, the 1921 Abb bungalow, the 1930 Tudor Revival Dr. Krembs house, the 1935 Colonial Revival Pfiffner house, the 1941 Neoclassical-style Nigbor house, and the 1963 Molepske Ranch house.
2	Folding Furniture Works Building	Folding Furniture Works Building	July 29, 1993 (#93000666)	1020 First St. 44°31′32″N 89°35′13″W	Stevens Point	The first factory here, built by John Worzalla in 1919 to build cribs and a folding children's swing that he patented, burned in 1931. He immediately rebuilt a larger, similar factory with old-fashioned clapboard siding and lots of windows for light. Later known as Lullabye Furniture Warehouse. Now apartments.
3	Fox Theater	Fox Theater	July 26, 1982 (#82000698)	1116-1128 Main St. 44°31′25″N 89°34′59″W	Stevens Point	Point's Grand Opera House was built in 1896 by G.F. Andrae, designed by Oscar Cobb in Romanesque style. It hosted charity events, theater productions, and speeches by Eugene Debs and William Jennings Bryan.
4	August G. and Theresa Green House	August G. and Theresa Green House	June 1, 2005 (#05000533)	1501 Main St. 44°31′32″N 89°34′38″W	Stevens Point	Queen Anne home designed by J. H. Jeffers and built in 1903. August was a Prussian immigrant who ran a meat market and lumber and coal business in Point, and invested in real estate.
5	Hardware Mutual Insurance Companies Building	Hardware Mutual Insurance Companies Building	December 1, 1994 (#94001358)	1421 Strongs Ave. 44°31′19″N 89°34′55″W	Stevens Point	The Classical Revival building designed by Childs & Smith of Chicago and built in 1922 for the Hardware Mutual Fire Insurance Company and Hardware Mutual Casualty Company features carvings, paintings and designs from artists around the U.S. Now houses offices of Sentry Insurance.
6	Hotel Whiting	Hotel Whiting	September 13, 1990 (#90001457)	1408 Strongs Ave. 44°31′19″N 89°34′57″W	Stevens Point	Mediterranean Revival-style hotel, designed by Alfred Clas and opened in 1923. Inside, a one-time bar contains murals with scenes from local history painted by local artist John Pfiffner in 1946. Now apartments and offices.
7	J. L. Jensen House	J. L. Jensen House	July 28, 1988 (#88001151)	1100 Brawley St. 44°31′09″N 89°34′50″W	Stevens Point	2.5-story exuberant Queen Anne home designed by Stevens Point architect J. H. Jeffers and built in 1901 for Jensen, who had owned a grocery store since 1881. Includes a Victorian-styled playhouse and garage. Now a B&B.
8	Christina Kuhl House	Christina Kuhl House	January 9, 1978 (#78000126)	1416 Main St. 44°31′25″N 89°34′41″W	Stevens Point	Second Empire house built in 1886 by family of cabinet-makers, brewers, and developers.
9	Mathias Mitchell Public Square-Main Street Historic District	Mathias Mitchell Public Square-Main Street Historic District	August 13, 1986 (#86001513)	Roughly Main St. from Strongs Ave. to Second St. 44°31′24″N 89°35′04″W	Stevens Point	Point's old downtown, platted by Mitchell in 1847. He donated the square to the city, and it has hosted a farmers' market since 1870. Buildings include the 1864 Italianate Bank of Stevens Point, the 1890 Queen Anne Ossowski Saloon/Glinski Tailor building (pictured), the 1896 Romanesque J.O. Johnsen General Store, the 1913 Zinda Saloon, the 1915 Art Deco Shafton glassware store, and the 1921 Neoclassical Citizens National Bank.
10	David McMillan House	David McMillan House	December 16, 1974 (#74000117)	1924 Pine St. 44°31′05″N 89°34′30″W	Stevens Point	High Victorian Gothic home built in 1873. McMillan brought his family west from New York in 1864 to operate a sawmill on the Plover River which supplied his lumber yard in Keokuk. His sons established the company lumber town McMillan north of Marshfield.
11	J. H. Morgan House	J. H. Morgan House	October 1, 1974 (#74000118)	2820 Madison Ave. 44°27′21″N 89°31′42″W	Plover	Greek Revival-styled house built in 1860 by C.J. Packard, when Plover was the seat of Portage County. Possibly modeled after similar houses back in New York. 1308 Madison Ave. is wrong address.
12	Nelson Hall	Nelson Hall	June 29, 2005 (#05000643)	1209 Fremont St. 44°31′33″N 89°34′04″W	Stevens Point	First dormitory at Stevens Point Normal School, designed by Van Ryn & DeGelleke in Prairie School style and built 1915-17. It was originally a women's dormitory, including a dining hall, kitchen, parlor, rec room, study room, and infirmary.
13	New Hope Norwegian Evangelical Lutheran Church and Cemetery	New Hope Norwegian Evangelical Lutheran Church and Cemetery	September 3, 2019 (#100004342)	1410 Cty. Rd. T 44°30′52″N 89°15′51″W	New Hope	Traditional rural wooden church built 1889 by its rural Norwegian immigrant Lutheran community. The overall vertical emphasis and pointed-arch windows are hallmarks of Gothic Revival architecture. Includes two adjacent cemeteries.
14	Old Plover Methodist Church	Old Plover Methodist Church	March 27, 1980 (#80000393)	Madison Ave. 44°27′25″N 89°32′27″W	Plover	Oldest surviving church building in the county, built by Presbyterians, when Greek Revival style was in and Plover was the county seat. It originally had a squarish-topped steeple. Sold to Methodist congregation in 1866. Now a museum.
15	Pipe School	Pipe School	November 4, 1993 (#93001171)	Jct. of Pipe Rd. and Co. Hwy. T 44°24′33″N 89°14′00″W	Lanark	Highly-intact one-room school built in 1889 with fieldstone foundation, balloon-frame structure, pressed-metal ceiling, and roof sheathed in tin. Served as a school until 1960.
16	L. A. Pomeroy House	L. A. Pomeroy House	November 5, 1992 (#92001560)	203 Laconia St. 44°27′01″N 89°17′12″W	Amherst	Very-intact 3-story Queen Anne home designed by J.H. Jeffers and built in 1904 for L.A. Pomeroy, who helped organize the International Bank in Amherst, pushed on the county board for better roads, and managed the Amherst opera house.
17	Rising Star Flouring Mill	Rising Star Flouring Mill	May 11, 2018 (#100002444)	3190 Cty. Rd. Q 44°29′38″N 89°18′38″W	Nelsonville	Wooden gristmill built by Jerome Nelson in 1868. In early years it ground local winter wheat into flour which was sold to logging camps and other customers. Still very intact.
18	John Gilbert Rosholt House	John Gilbert Rosholt House	April 27, 2010 (#10000232)	237 N. Main St. 44°37′54″N 89°18′34″W	Rosholt	2.5-story Queen Anne style house finished in 1906, with a garage built in 1908 when John bought his first auto. Rosholt started the sawmill and bank and was the central figure in the community's development.
19	Severance-Pipe Farmstead	Severance-Pipe Farmstead	October 29, 1993 (#93001163)	Pipe Rd., 1/8 mi. E of Co. Hwy. T 44°24′39″N 89°13′54″W	Lanark	Remarkably intact old farm begun by New Hampshire immigrant John Severance, and later run by Thomas Pipe and his family for over 100 years. Structures are the balloon framed, Greek Revival-influenced farmhouse and a granary built in the 1850s, a small animal barn built around 1860, an 1880 dairy barn, an 1880 privy, a 1900 corn crib, and a 1900 garage.
20	Sisters of St. Joseph Complex	Sisters of St. Joseph Complex	October 23, 2023 (#100009476)	1300 Maria Drive; 44°32′04″N 89°34′49″W	Stevens Point	Convent complex of the Sisters of St. Joseph of the Third Order of St. Francis, begun in 1902. This order focused on staffing parochial schools for Polish Catholic parishes in the Midwest. Includes grotto built in 1923.
21	Stevens Point State Normal School	Stevens Point State Normal School	December 12, 1976 (#76000074)	2100 Main St. 44°31′28″N 89°34′07″W	Stevens Point	Built in 1894, the building now known as "Old Main" was at that time Wisconsin's sixth normal school. Selby and Perkins of Chicago designed the Richardsonian Romanesque-styled hall, since added to.
22	Temple Beth Israel	Temple Beth Israel	March 1, 2007 (#07000101)	1475 Water St. 44°31′13″N 89°34′59″W	Stevens Point	Synagogue of Point's local Jewish community, built in 1905 and used through 1986. Once surrounded by a largely Jewish neighborhood. Now a museum.

== See also ==
- List of National Historic Landmarks in Wisconsin
- National Register of Historic Places listings in Wisconsin
- Listings in neighboring counties: Adams, Marathon, Shawano, Waupaca, Waushara, Wood
