= National Register of Historic Places listings in Adams County, Wisconsin =

Location of Adams County in Wisconsin

This is a list of the National Register of Historic Places listings in Adams County, Wisconsin, United States. It is intended to provide a comprehensive listing of entries in the National Register of Historic Places that are located in Adams County, Wisconsin. The locations of National Register properties for which the latitude and longitude coordinates are included below may be seen in a map.

There are 3 properties and districts listed on the National Register in the county.

This National Park Service list is complete through NPS recent listings posted March 21, 2025.

== Current listings ==
	Name on the Register	Image	Date listed	Location	City or town	Description
1	Adams County Courthouse	Adams County Courthouse	March 9, 1982 (#82000627)	402 Main St. 43°58′15″N 89°48′55″W	Friendship	1914 Neoclassical building, designed by Arthur Peabody, sited in Friendship after a hotly contested vote with the neighboring city of Adams.
2	Gunning–Purves Building	Gunning–Purves Building	March 3, 2015 (#15000056)	311 Main St. 43°58′18″N 89°48′59″W	Friendship	1904 commercial building with pressed metal ornamentation from George L. Mesker & Co. on the outside and inside. Has housed a bank, a realtor, a furniture store, a funeral home, and now the Adams County Heritage Center.
3	Roche-a-Cri Petroglyphs	Roche-a-Cri Petroglyphs	May 11, 1981 (#81000031)	1.5 miles north of Friendship on Hwy 13; 44°00′06″N 89°49′04″W	Friendship	Oneota rock art on a sandstone bluff, vandalized by early soldiers and settlers.

== See also ==
- List of National Historic Landmarks in Wisconsin
- National Register of Historic Places listings in Wisconsin
- Listings in neighboring counties: Columbia, Juneau, Marquette, Portage, Sauk, Waushara, Wood
