= Alan Galbraith =

Alan Galbraith may refer to:

- Alan Galbraith (politician)
- Alan Galbraith (record producer)
- Alan Galbraith (lawyer), King's Counsel in New Zealand
