= McMillan House =

McMillan House may refer to:

- McMillan House (Daphne, Alabama), listed on the National Register of Historic Places (NRHP) in Baldwin County
- Robert McMillan House, Clarkesville, Georgia, listed on the NRHP in Habersham County
- McMillan-Garrison House, Clarkesville, Georgia, listed on the NRHP in Habersham County
- Samuel McMillan House, Shawhan, Kentucky, listed on the NRHP in Harrison County
- McMillan House (Latta, South Carolina), listed on the NRHP in Dillon County
- Alexander McMillan House, Knoxville, Tennessee, NRHP-listed
- Clotworthy-McMillan House, Heber City, Utah, listed on the NRHP in Wasatch County
- David McMillan House, Stevens Point, Wisconsin, listed on the NRHP in Portage County
