= Pipe School =

- U.S. National Register of Historic Places
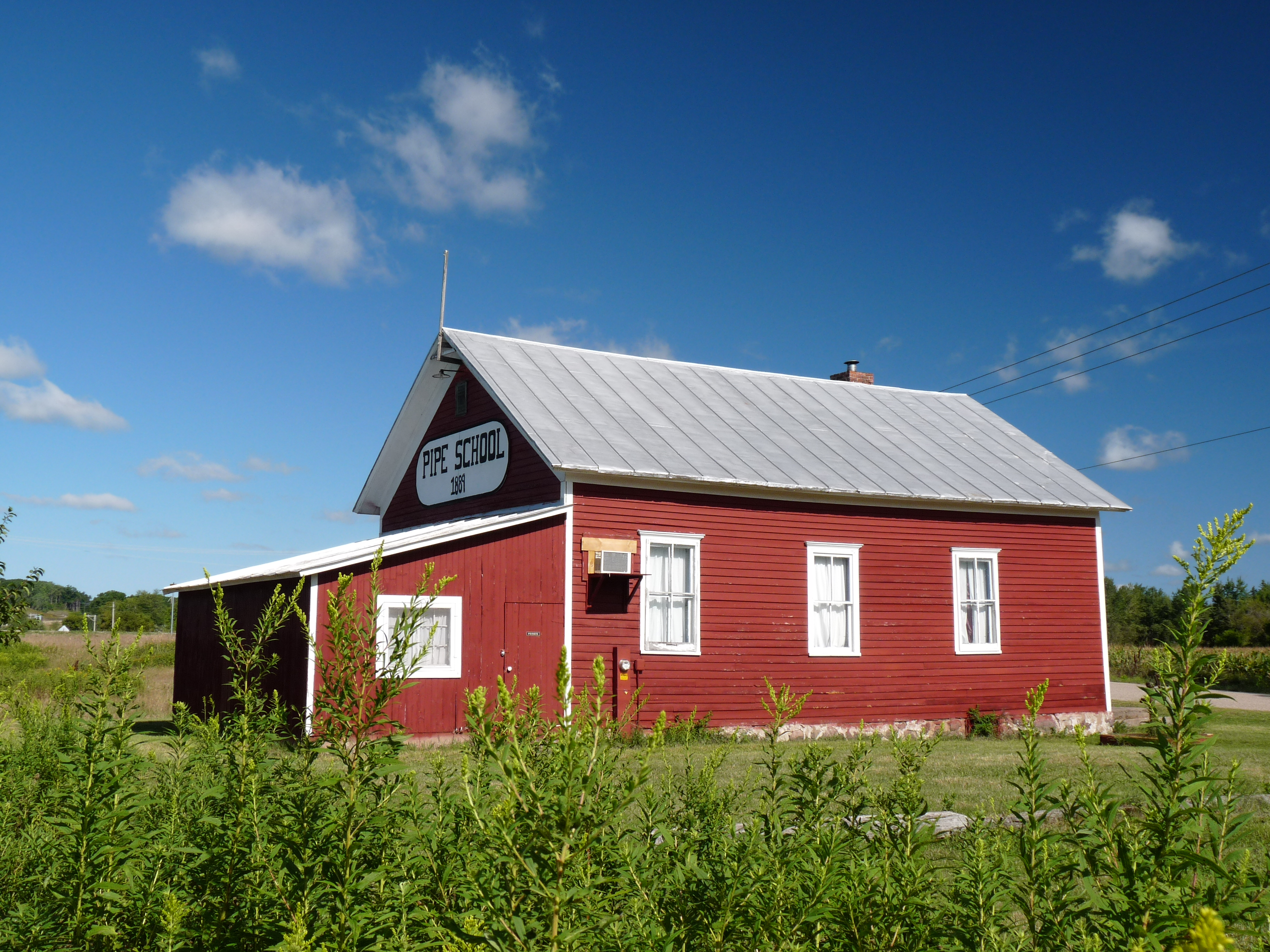
- Pipe School
- Location: 110003 Pipe Rd. Lanark, Wisconsin 54406
- Coordinates: 44.40943°N 89.23338°W
- NRHP reference No.: 93001171
- Added to NRHP: November 4, 1993

The Pipe School is located in Lanark, Wisconsin, United States. It was added to the National Register of Historic Places in 1993 and built in 1889.

== History ==
Members of the Jeffers family moved to Farmington in Waupaca County in 1855. The family had been in Wisconsin since they first settled in Racine County in the 1840s. They moved to the town of Farmington in Waupaca County in 1855.

On November 8, 1858, Truman Jeffers was married to Adeline Severance, daughter of Mr. and Mrs. John Severance. Adeline was the first teacher of what is now known as the Pipe School in the town of Lanark. Truman Jeffers was living on what is now the William Pipe farm in Lanark in 1856. Adeline Severance Jeffers received a wage of $2.00 for a 5½-day week and boarded at home. Eliza Jeffers also taught there for $1.56 per week for four months.

Adolphis Kilby, husband of Ellen Jeffers, a daughter of George Jeffers, had a shoe shop across from the present William Pipe farm.

On October 14, 1881, Julius Jeffers was married to Cordelia Thayer, who was the second teacher at the Pipe School. Family records show a long history of teachers, farmers and lumbermen. The Revolutionary War ancestor of the Jeffers family was a school teacher.

It was a one-room schoolhouse.
