= Adams County Courthouse (Wisconsin) =

Historic building in Wisconsin, United States

- U.S. National Register of Historic Places
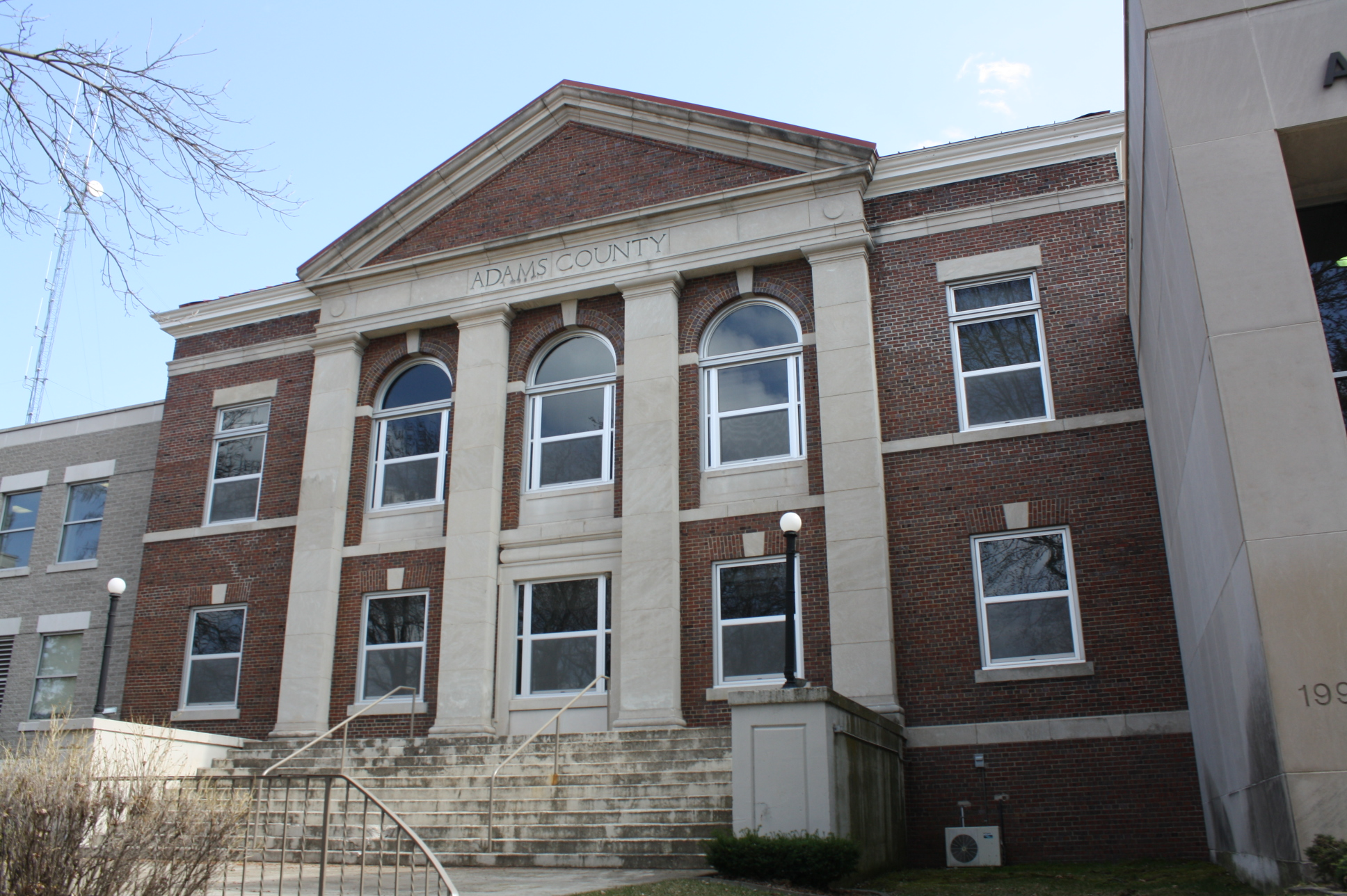

- Location within Wisconsin Location within the United States
- Interactive map showing the location of Adams County Courthouse
- Location: 402 Main St. Friendship, Wisconsin
- Coordinates: 43°58′14.94″N 89°48′54.65″W
- Architect: Arthur Peabody
- MPS: County Courthouses of Wisconsin TR
- NRHP reference No.: 82000627
- Added to NRHP: March 9, 1982

The Adams County Courthouse is a Neoclassical brick building in Friendship, Adams County, Wisconsin. Designed by Arthur Peabody, it was completed in 1914. It was added to the National Register of Historic Places in 1982 for its architectural significance in Adams County.

By the early 1900s, Adams County's previous courthouse in Friendship needed replacement, and in 1912 the County Board approved architectural plans for a new courthouse. At the time though, there was a rivalry between the villages of Friendship and nearby Adams. In a 1913 vote on the $30,000 bond to build the courthouse, Friendship voted overwhelmingly for, and Adams overwhelmingly against. The total support was sufficient and the project went ahead.

In 1913, the old wooden courthouse was torn down and replaced with the current brick courthouse. George Kieke was the chief construction engineer. Arthur Peabody, the UW's supervising architect at the time, designed the modest building in the Neoclassical style that somewhat recalls a Roman or Greek temple, with four colossal pilasters supporting an entablature inscribed Adams County.

One hundred years later, the courthouse is still used for public offices, and is still a central landmark in the village of Friendship.
