= Adams County Airport =

Adams County Airport Legion Field
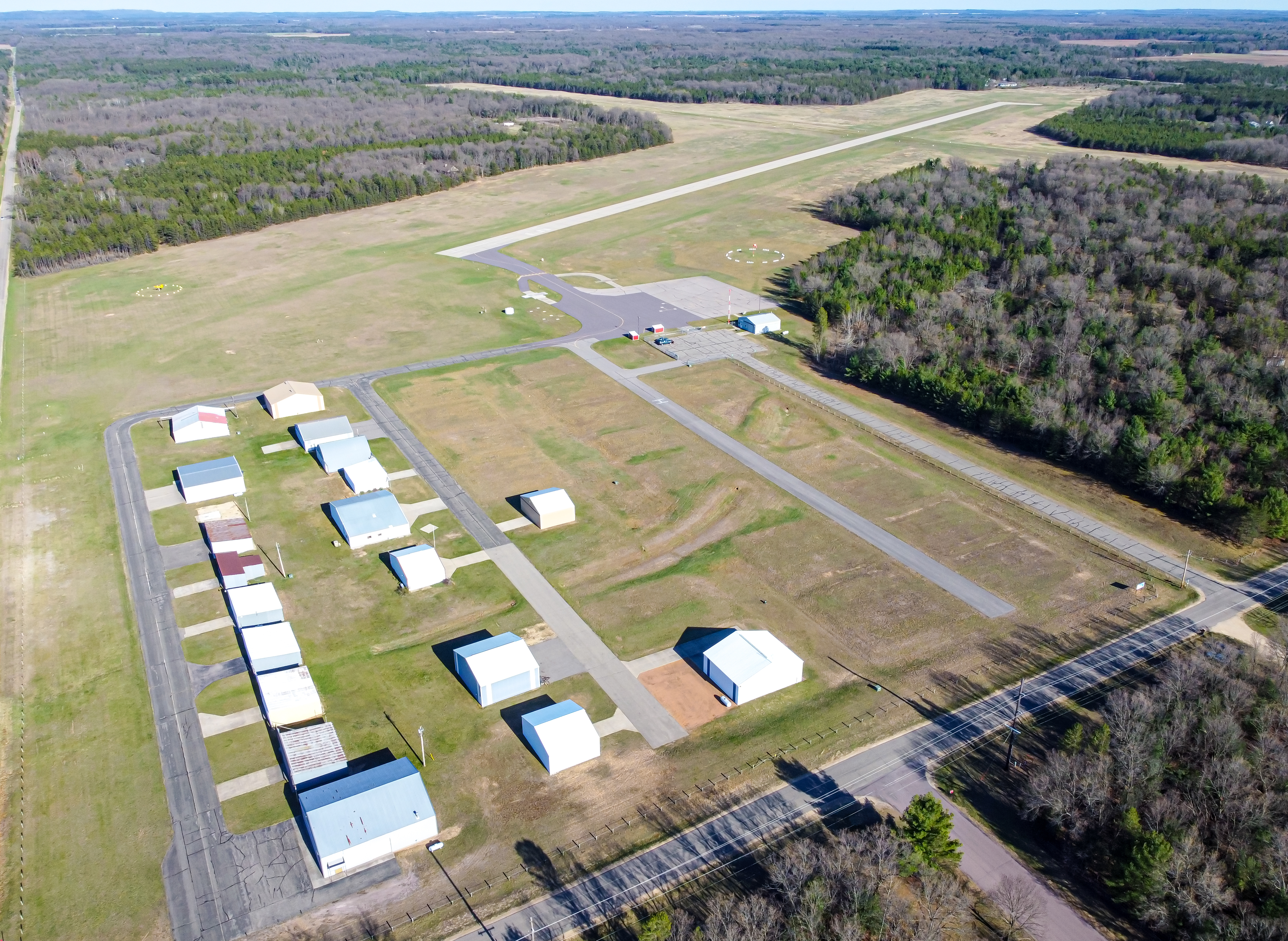
- IATA: none; ICAO: none; FAA LID: 63C

Summary
- Airport type: Public
- Owner: Adams County
- Location: Friendship / Adams, Wisconsin
- Time zone: CST (UTC−06:00)
  - Summer (DST): CDT (UTC−05:00)
- Elevation AMSL: 979 ft (298 m)
- Coordinates: 43°57′38″N 089°47′19″W

Map
- Location of airport in Wisconsin 63C (the United States)

Runways
Direction	Length		Surface
Direction	ft	m	Surface
15/33	3,398	1,036	Asphalt
8/26	2,780	847	Turf

Statistics
- Aircraft operations (2022): 7,070
- Based aircraft (2024): 13
- Source: Federal Aviation Administration

Adams County Airport (FAA LID: 63C), also known as Legion Field, is a county-owned public-use airport located in Adams County, Wisconsin, United States. The airport is one nautical mile (1.85 km) east of the village of Friendship and the city of Adams. It is included in the Federal Aviation Administration (FAA) National Plan of Integrated Airport Systems for 2025–2029, in which it is categorized as a basic general aviation facility.

== Facilities and aircraft ==
The airport covers an area of 380 acres (150 ha) at an elevation of 979 ft (298 m) above mean sea level. It has two runways: 15/33 is 3,398 by 60 ft (1,036 by 18 m) with an asphalt pavement and an approved GPS approach; 8/26 is 2,780 by 100 ft (847 by 30 m) with a turf surface.

For the 12-month period ending June 28, 2022, the airport had 7,070 aircraft operations, an average of 19 per day: 99% general aviation, 1% air taxi and less than 1% military. In July 2024, there were 13 aircraft based at this airport: all 13 single-engine.

== See also ==
- List of airports in Wisconsin
