= National Register of Historic Places listings in Waushara County, Wisconsin =

Location of Waushara County in Wisconsin

This is a list of the National Register of Historic Places listings in Waushara County, Wisconsin. It is intended to provide a comprehensive listing of entries in the National Register of Historic Places that are located in Waushara County, Wisconsin. The locations of National Register properties for which the latitude and longitude coordinates are included below may be seen in a map.

There are 3 properties and districts listed on the National Register in the county.

This National Park Service list is complete through NPS recent listings posted March 21, 2025.

== Current listings ==
	Name on the Register	Image	Date listed	Location	City or town	Description
1	Alanson M. Kimball House	Alanson M. Kimball House	October 20, 1988 (#88002023)	204 Middleton St. 44°09′10″N 89°04′44″W	Pine River	Kimball was a local merchant in Pine River, and eventually a US Congressman. He built this house in 1860 in Greek Revival style and remodelled it in 1901 to the then-popular Colonial Revival style. Included in the listing are garages, an 1860 barn, and a gazebo.
2	Waushara County Courthouse, Waushara County Sheriff's Residence and Jail	Waushara County Courthouse, Waushara County Sheriff's Residence and Jail	March 9, 1982 (#82000729)	209 St. Marie St. 44°04′25″N 89°17′24″W	Wautoma	The sheriff's residence and jail is a 1908 brick Georgian Revival building with quoins, designed by C. H. Williams. The courthouse is a Neoclassical building designed by E. A. Stubenrauch and built in 1928.
3	Whistler Mound Group	Whistler Mound Group	September 18, 1993 (#93000882)	E of Hancock on FF; 44°07′39″N 89°30′06″W	Hancock	Two lines of conical mounds and an oval enclosure wall 120 by 51 feet. Probably constructed between 500 and 1200 CE by Late Woodland people.

== See also ==
- List of National Historic Landmarks in Wisconsin
- National Register of Historic Places listings in Wisconsin
- Listings in neighboring counties: Adams, Green Lake, Marquette, Portage, Waupaca, Winnebago
