= Sentry Insurance =

American insurance company

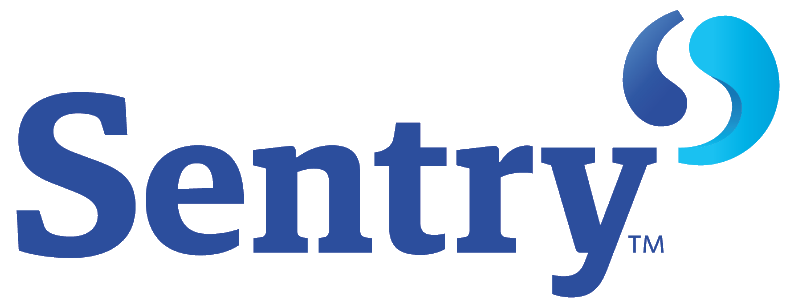
- Type: Private
- Industry: Insurance and finance
- Founded: 1904; 122 years ago
- Headquarters: Stevens Point, Wisconsin, U.S.
- Key people: Pete McPartland (President, CEO and Chairman of the Board)
- Revenue: ▲$6.2 billion USD (2025)
- Net income: ▲$633 million USD (2025)
- Total assets: ▲$29.8 billion USD (2025)
- Number of employees: 6,500 (2026)
- Website: www.sentry.com

Sentry Insurance is a mutual insurance company specializing in business insurance. The company’s home office is in Stevens Point, Wisconsin, where about 1/3 the company’s approximately 6,500 employees are located. Sentry offers property and casualty insurance, workers' compensation, life insurance, and other business insurance, as well as non-insurance products like annuities and retirement programs. Sentry provides specialized insurance programs to customers in specific industries as well as very large companies with complex risk.

Sentry is one of the nation’s largest mutual insurance companies. As of December 31, 2025, the company has assets of more than $29.8 billion and a policyholder surplus of over $8.7 billion. Sentry was rated A+ by A.M. Best, the insurance industry’s leading rating authority, as of 2015. In 2025, Sentry Insurance was ranked 614 on the Fortune 1000 list of companies.

== History ==
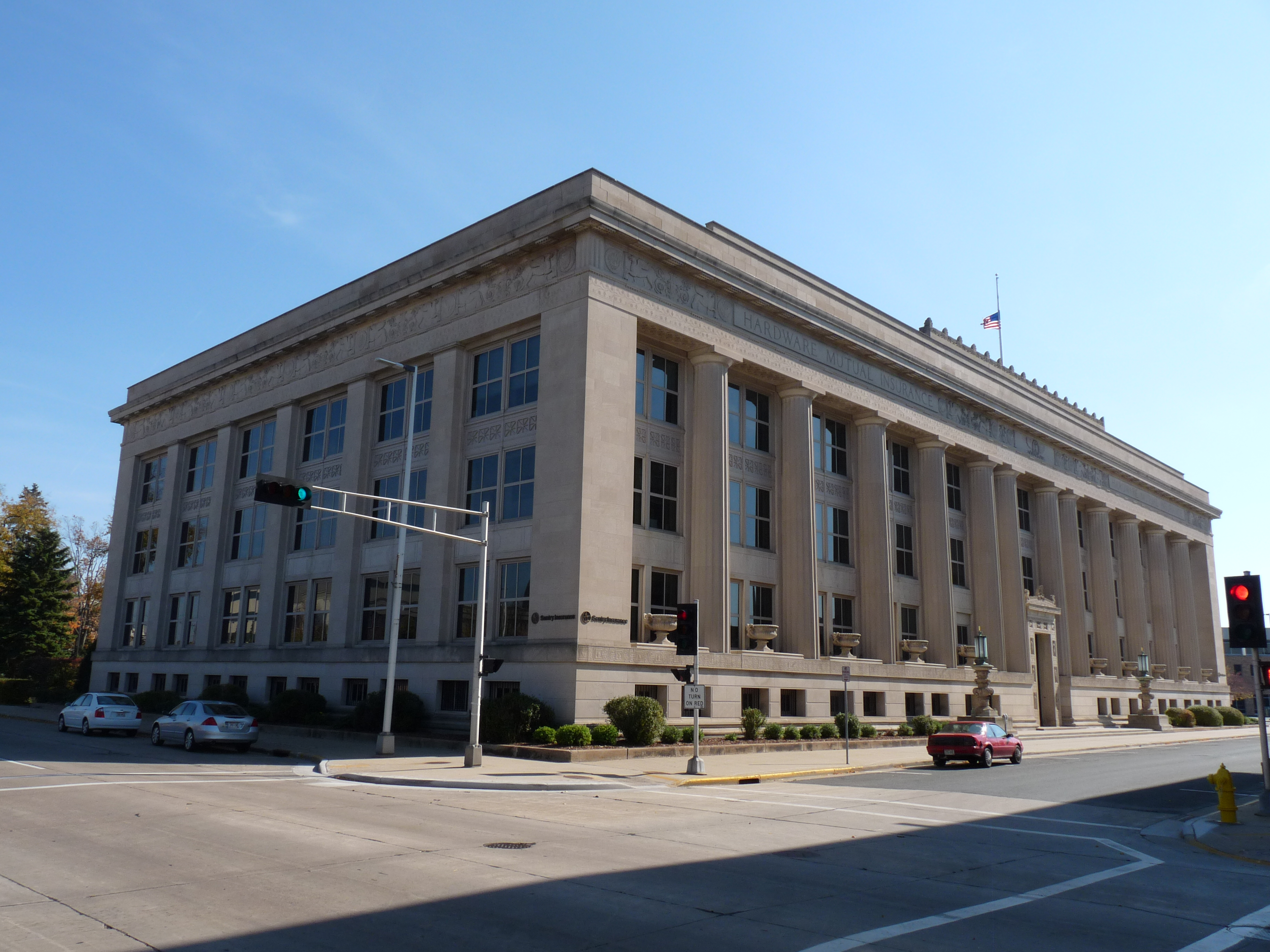
The Hardware Mutual Insurance Companies Building in Stevens Point, Wisconsin.

Sentry Insurance was founded in 1904 by members of the Wisconsin Retail Hardware Association, now the Midwest Hardware Association, to provide insurance for its members in the hardware industry. Its headquarters for many years was the Hardware Mutual Insurance Companies Building, built in 1922 and now listed on the National Register of Historic Places. Though supplanted by a new headquarters in 1977, the historic building remained in use by the company until 2019, when operations out of the historic building were moved to a newly constructed facility just across from the main headquarters. The new building stands 7 stories in height and filled a long vacant field on the city’s north side.

The company also owns its own golf course, SentryWorld, which opened in 1982. Designed by Robert Trent Jones Jr., it is regarded as a "destination golf course".

- In 2015, Sentry entered an affiliation agreement with Hortica Insurance & Employee Benefits, adding a new line of business specializing in providing insurance and benefit programs to retail florists and related companies.
- In 2014, Sentry purchased Anchor Management General Agency, establishing entry into the management general agency distribution model.
- Also in 2014, Sentry began supplying its transportation clients with DriveCam in-car cameras.
- In 2013, Sentry released a mobile version of its risk management portal.
- In March, 2012, Sentry Insurance named Pete McPartland CEO. He previously had served as president and chief operating officer. In September, 2012, Sentry Insurance laid off 27 office workers and 144 home-based agents as it restructured its strategy for selling personal line policies. It launched a new independent agency, Point Insurance, to serve policyholders in central Wisconsin and offer Sentry products as well as those of other companies. The company subsequently received a 2013 Stakeholder Team Accomplishment Recognition™ (STAR) award from Demotech, Inc. for its operating results in 2012. The national award was based upon multiple financial measures; Demotech reviewed 2,736 property and casualty carriers, and Sentry was one of two companies in the Near National company classification to receive its top rating.
- In June 2020, Sentry Insurance sponsored a 2020 Sentry Tournament of Champions, and more than a dozen non-profit Maui organizations benefited from the 2020 Champions Sentry Tournament, totalling more than $450,000 in total funds raised. Sentry Insurance Chief Marketing and Brand Officer Stephanie Smith, with officials and non-profit members from the Sentry Tournament of Champions, revealed that $459,743 has been allocated to community organizations.
- On September 12, 2024, Sentry Insurance announced it will acquire The General from American Family Insurance for approximately $1.1 billion in cash consideration.

== Logo ==
Sentry rebranded in 2016. A new Sentry word mark includes a symbol made up of two stylized single quote quotation marks paired up into a circle, reminiscent of the yin and yang symbol, representing two sides of a conversation. The negative space between the quotation marks takes on the shape of an S.

The company's previous logo was a Minuteman image based on a sculpture of Capt. John Parker located in Lexington, Massachusetts.

== Operations ==
The company offers life, group health, auto, and other property/casualty lines. Sentry's property and casualty companies are rated A+ by A. M. Best. The Sentry group of companies includes Dairyland, Peak Property and Casualty, Viking Insurance Company of Wisconsin, and about a dozen others.

== Corporate Philanthropy ==
Sentry Insurance supports a variety of nonprofits and educational institutions, both through employee donations and volunteerism, and through its Sentry Foundation.

=== Employee initiatives ===
Employees in the headquarters and other offices in Stevens Point, Wisconsin, have raised funds and volunteered for a number of local nonprofits. Highlights of their activities include raising the bulk of a $1 million donation for a United Way campaign in Portage County (location of Stevens Point) in 2015 and collecting and donating more than 2,600 food and household items to local food pantries in December 2015.

=== Sentry Insurance Foundation ===
The Sentry Insurance Foundation, a private grantmaking foundation in Stevens Point, Wisconsin, was established in 1995. It disbursed $3.7 million in grants in 2014. The foundation made grants of more than $7 million in technology to classrooms in Portage County, Wisconsin, between 2008 and 2015. It awarded a $4 million grant to the University of Wisconsin-Stevens Point in 2016 to fund a data analytics major. On December 15, 2022 the Sentry Insurance Foundation announced a gift of $10 million to the University of Wisconsin-Steven's Point's School of Business and Economics. In honor of the gift the University renamed the business school as the "Sentry School of Business and Economics".

== See also ==
- List of United States insurance companies
