= Edwin W. Blomquist =

American politician

Edwin Blomquist

Member of the Wisconsin Assembly
- In office 1935–1939

Mayor of Adams, Wisconsin
- In office 1927–1939

Personal details
- Born: October 30, 1896 Chicago, Illinois
- Died: July 6, 1963 (aged 66) Adams, Wisconsin
- Party: Progressive
- Education: La Salle Extension University

Edwin W. Blomquist (October 30, 1896 – July 6, 1963) was an American railroad locomotive engineer, labor activist, and politician.

== Early life and education ==
Born in Chicago, Illinois, Blomquist moved with his family to Sweden in 1900 before returning to the United States in 1914, living in Madison, Wisconsin. He took courses at La Salle Extension University.

== Career ==
Blomquist worked as a locomotive engineer for the Chicago and North Western Transportation Company. He was also active in the Brotherhood of Locomotive Firemen and Enginemen. Blomquist lived in Adams, Wisconsin and served on the Adams Common Council and as mayor from 1927 to 1939. From 1935 to 1939, Blomquist served in the Wisconsin State Assembly as a Progressive. In 1946, Blomquist helped organized the Democratic Party in Adams County, Wisconsin and served as county chairman.

== Death ==
Blomquist died in a hospital in Adams, Wisconsin on July 6, 1963.
