= Badger, Wisconsin =

- Unincorporated community
- Location within Wisconsin Location within the United States
- Coordinates: 44°20′11.7″N 89°14′20.3″W
- Country: United States
- State: Wisconsin
- County: Portage
- Time zone: UTC-6 (Central (CST))
  - Summer (DST): UTC-5 (CDT)
- Area codes: 715 and 534

Badger is an unincorporated community in the town of Lanark in Portage County, Wisconsin, United States.

== Geography ==
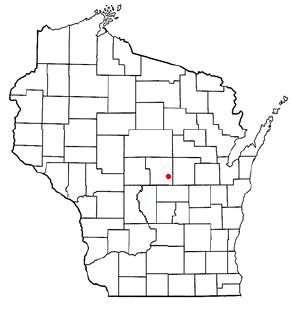
Location of Badger, Wisconsin

Badger is located in central Wisconsin, approximately eight miles southeast of Amherst and approximately six miles southwest of Waupaca. Badger is approximately four miles northeast of the unincorporated community of Blaine, and borders Hartman Creek State Park.

== History ==
Badger was once a stop-over on the trail between Waupaca and Plover Portage (modern Plover) on what is today State Road 54. Badger was the seat for the town of Lanark, including at one time bearing a post office around 1870–1901 with the same name. Badger had several bars in its proximity.

Today, the garage and town hall for Lanark is located two miles to the east, near the intersection of State Road 54 and County Road TT. Badger no longer has its own post office, but several bars remain in the area.
