= Friendship Mound =

Mound in Adams County, Wisconsin, US

Coordinates: 43°59′02″N 89°49′02″W

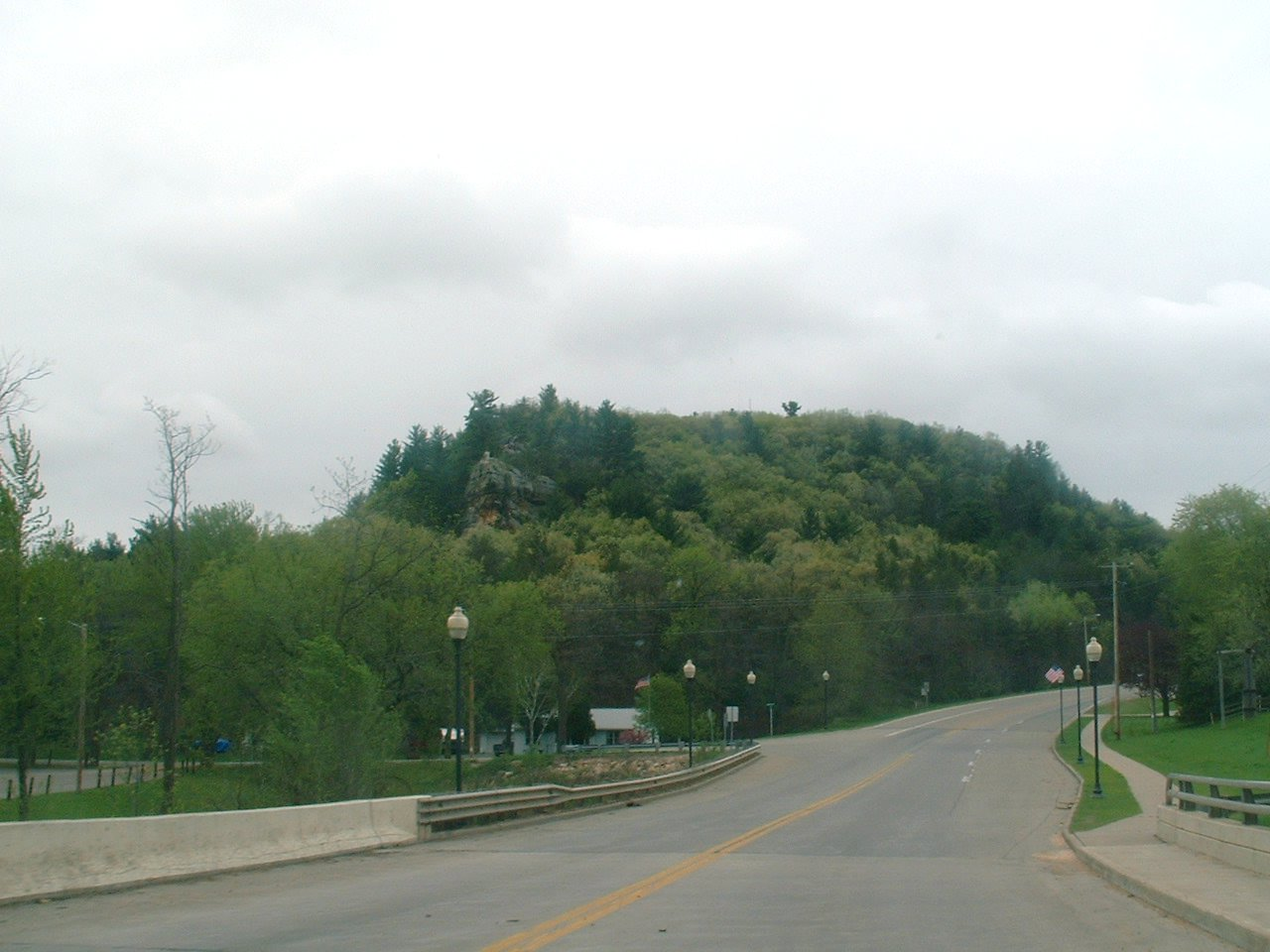
Friendship Mound in 2006

Friendship Mound (also known as Rocky Bluff) is a castellated mound, located just north of the village of Friendship, Adams County, in the U.S. state of Wisconsin. It is the highest point in Adams County, with an elevation of 1,290–1,300 feet (390–400 m), and a prominence of 330 feet (100 m). (Note, however that the adjacent Roche-A-Cri Mound in Roche-A-Cri State Park is locally regarded as "not far behind".) Friendship Lake is also adjacent to this mound (notably separated by Wisconsin Highway 13).
