= National Register of Historic Places listings in Marquette County, Wisconsin =

Location of Marquette County in Wisconsin

This is a list of the National Register of Historic Places listings in Marquette County, Wisconsin. It is intended to provide a comprehensive listing of entries in the National Register of Historic Places that are located in Marquette County, Wisconsin. The locations of National Register properties for which the latitude and longitude coordinates are included below may be seen on a map.

There are 7 properties and districts listed on the National Register in the county.

This National Park Service list is complete through NPS recent listings posted April 10, 2026.

== Current listings ==
	Name on the Register	Image	Date listed	Location	City or town	Description
1	Bonnie Oaks Historic District	Bonnie Oaks Historic District	April 3, 1986 (#86000626)	Grouse Dr. 43°39′05″N 89°33′39″W	Briggsville	Estate of the Atwood, Ormsby, and Green family, which served as an artist's retreat in the 1920s and 1930s, with visits from Robert Fitzgerald, Zona Gale, Paul Robeson, and others.
2	Fountain Lake Farm	Fountain Lake Farm	June 21, 1990 (#90000471)	Co. Hwy. F and Gillette Rd. 43°41′24″N 89°23′15″W	Montello	Boyhood home of naturalist John Muir, where some of his ideas were formed.
3	Marquette County Courthouse and Marquette County Sheriff's Office and Jail	Marquette County Courthouse and Marquette County Sheriff's Office and Jail	March 9, 1982 (#82000685)	77 W. Park St. 43°47′36″N 89°19′48″W	Montello	1918 Beaux-Arts courthouse built of Montello granite and Bedford limestone.
4	Montello Commercial Historic District	Montello Commercial Historic District	March 7, 1996 (#96000238)	Roughly, parts of W. Montello and Main Sts. at the Montello R. and the quarry on E. Montello St. 43°47′31″N 89°19′38″W	Montello	Quarry which operated from 1881 to 1976, most notably providing red granite for President Grant's tomb. Also old Italianate and Queen Anne buildings.
5	Charles Samuel Richter House	Charles Samuel Richter House	August 16, 1996 (#96000908)	55, 103, and 105 Underwood Ave. 43°47′36″N 89°19′49″W	Montello	Colonial Revival house designed by Parkinson & Dockendorff and built in 1912 for the president of the Montello Granite Company from locally quarried granite.
6	St. John's Evangelical Lutheran Church	St. John's Evangelical Lutheran Church	July 18, 2025 (#100012024)	W3005-W3008 County Road E 43°55′11″N 89°18′45″W	Crystal Lake	
7	Vaughn's Hall and Blacksmith Shop	Vaughn's Hall and Blacksmith Shop	June 12, 2007 (#07000556)	55 W. Montello St. 43°47′31″N 89°19′46″W	Montello	Cement block building built in 1912 as a blacksmith shop with a community hall upstairs. Later a garage, car dealership, hardware store, and now a museum.

== See also ==
- List of National Historic Landmarks in Wisconsin
- National Register of Historic Places listings in Wisconsin
- Listings in neighboring counties: Adams, Columbia, Green Lake, Waushara
