= Alan Galbraith (politician) =

American politician (1880–1964)

Alan Galbraith (1880–1964) was a member of the Wisconsin State Assembly.

== Biography ==
Galbraith was born on May 16, 1880, in Adams County, Wisconsin. He died in 1964.

== Career ==
Galbraith was elected to the Assembly in 1916. Other positions he held include Register of Deeds of Adams County and justice of the peace in Friendship, Wisconsin. He was a Republican.
