= Hardware Mutual Insurance Companies Building =

- U.S. National Register of Historic Places
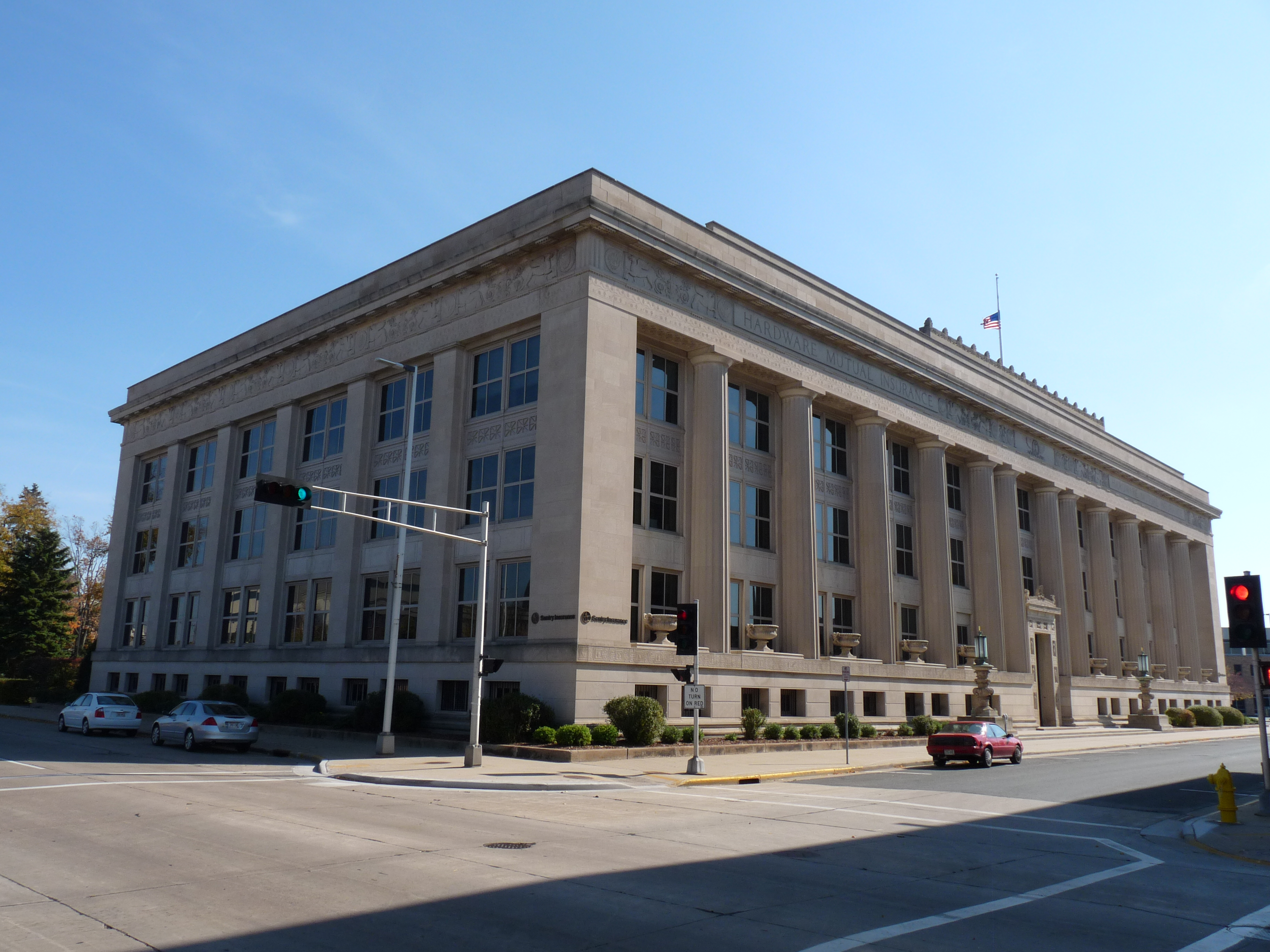
- Hardware Mutual Insurance Companies Building
- Location: 1421 Strongs Ave. Stevens Point, Wisconsin
- Coordinates: 44.5220381°N 89.5819308°W
- Built: 1922
- Architect: Childs and Smith
- Architectural style: Classical Revival
- NRHP reference No.: 94001358
- Added to NRHP: December 1, 1994

The Hardware Mutual Insurance Companies Building is located in Stevens Point, Wisconsin. It was added to the National Register of Historic Places in 1994. The building still houses the insurance company, now known as Sentry Insurance.
