= Adams, Wisconsin =

- City
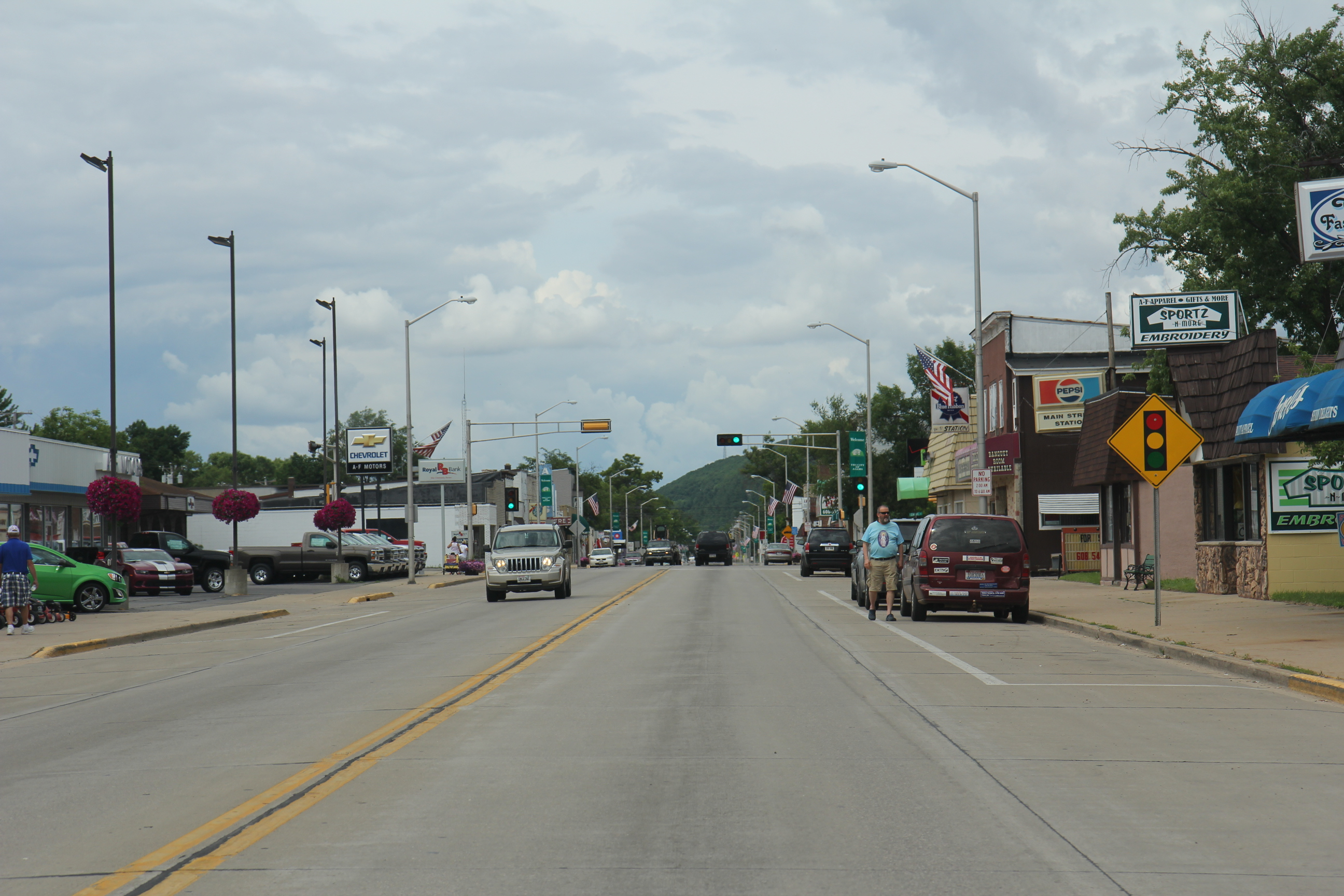
- Looking north in Adams on WIS 13

- Logo
- Motto: "A Tradition of Progress"
- Location within Adams County and Wisconsin

- Location within Wisconsin Location within the United States
- Coordinates: 43°57′26″N 89°49′3″W
- Country: United States
- State: Wisconsin
- County: Adams

Area
  - Total: 2.95 sq mi (7.63 km^{2})
  - Land: 2.95 sq mi (7.63 km^{2})
  - Water: 0.0039 sq mi (0.01 km^{2})
- Elevation: 965 ft (294 m)

Population (2020)
  - Total: 1,761
  - Estimate (2023): 1,780
  - Density: 642.9/sq mi (248.21/km^{2})
- Time zone: UTC-6 (Central (CST))
  - Summer (DST): UTC-5 (CDT)
- ZIP code: 53910
- Area code: 608
- FIPS code: 55-00275
- GNIS feature ID: 1560681
- Website: cityofadamswi.org

Adams is a city in Adams County, Wisconsin, United States. The population was 1,761 at the 2020 census. The city is located within the Town of Adams.

== History ==
Adams was originally called South Friendship, but after a petition from residents who did not like the name, the Chicago and North Western Railway changed it to Adams due to its short nature. The town became a division point in 1911 for the lines of the Chicago and North Western Railway The Milwaukee, Sparta, and Northwestern Railroad, a subsidiary of the Chicago and North Western Railway, began the "Air Line" or "Adams Cutoff" from Adams towards Sparta, Wisconsin in 1910.

== Geography ==
According to the United States Census Bureau, the city has a total area of 2.96 square miles (7.67 km^{2}), of which 2.95 square miles (7.64 km^{2}) is land and 0.01 square miles (0.03 km^{2}) is water. Adams is located at 43°57′19″N 89°49′1″W (43.955280, -89.816920).

Adams shares a common border with the Village of Friendship, leading to the common use of the name Adams-Friendship in news and weather reports as well as the name of the city's school district Adams Friendship Area School District.

== Demographics ==
Historical population
Census	Pop.	Note	%±
1920	1,119		—
1930	1,231		10.0%
1940	1,310		6.4%
1950	1,425		8.8%
1960	1,301		−8.7%
1970	1,440		10.7%
1980	1,744		21.1%
1990	1,715		−1.7%
2000	1,914		11.6%
2010	1,967		2.8%
2020	1,761		−10.5%
U.S. Decennial Census

=== 2020 census ===
As of the 2020 census, Adams had a population of 1,761. The median age was 46.9 years. 20.8% of residents were under the age of 18 and 24.2% of residents were 65 years of age or older. For every 100 females there were 92.9 males, and for every 100 females age 18 and over there were 88.1 males age 18 and over.

0.0% of residents lived in urban areas, while 100.0% lived in rural areas.

There were 808 households in Adams, of which 21.5% had children under the age of 18 living in them. Of all households, 29.0% were married-couple households, 25.4% were households with a male householder and no spouse or partner present, and 36.1% were households with a female householder and no spouse or partner present. About 43.1% of all households were made up of individuals and 20.4% had someone living alone who was 65 years of age or older.

There were 917 housing units, of which 11.9% were vacant. The homeowner vacancy rate was 3.6% and the rental vacancy rate was 7.7%.

Racial composition as of the 2020 census
Race	Number	Percent
White	1,630	92.6%
Black or African American	14	0.8%
American Indian and Alaska Native	6	0.3%
Asian	4	0.2%
Native Hawaiian and Other Pacific Islander	0	0.0%
Some other race	23	1.3%
Two or more races	84	4.8%
Hispanic or Latino (of any race)	75	4.3%

=== 2010 census ===
As of the census of 2010, there were 1,967 people, 886 households, and 479 families living in the city. The population density was 666.8 inhabitants per square mile (257.5/km^{2}). There were 990 housing units at an average density of 335.6 per square mile (129.6/km^{2}). The racial makeup of the city was 94.8% White, 1.3% African American, 0.9% Native American, 0.5% Asian, 0.7% from other races, and 1.9% from two or more races. Hispanic or Latino of any race were 2.3% of the population.

There were 886 households, of which 27.1% had children under the age of 18 living with them, 33.6% were married couples living together, 15.5% had a female householder with no husband present, 5.0% had a male householder with no wife present, and 45.9% were non-families. 41.5% of all households were made up of individuals, and 22.3% had someone living alone who was 65 years of age or older. The average household size was 2.20 and the average family size was 2.96.

The median age in the city was 42.2 years. 24% of residents were under the age of 18; 7.5% were between the ages of 18 and 24; 21.7% were from 25 to 44; 25.2% were from 45 to 64; and 21.5% were 65 years of age or older. The gender makeup of the city was 46.0% male and 54.0% female.

=== 2000 census ===
As of the census of 2000, there were 1,914 people, 769 households, and 470 families living in the city. The population density was 650.1 people per square mile (251.4/km^{2}). There were 847 housing units at an average density of 287.7 per square mile (111.2/km^{2}). The racial makeup of the city was 97.75% White, 0.16% Black or African American, 0.37% Native American, 0.05% Asian, 0.47% from other races, and 1.20% from two or more races. Hispanic or Latino of any race were 1.93% of the population.

There were 769 households, out of which 31.1% had children under the age of 18 living with them, 42.1% were married couples living together, 15.0% had a female householder with no husband present, and 38.8% were non-families. 35.0% of all households were made up of individuals, and 17.8% had someone living alone who was 65 years of age or older. The average household size was 2.34 and the average family size was 3.00.

In the city, the population was spread out, with 26.1% under the age of 18, 6.9% from 18 to 24, 25.6% from 25 to 44, 18.2% from 45 to 64, and 23.1% who were 65 years of age or older. The median age was 39 years. For every 100 females, there were 81.4 males. For every 100 females age 18 and over, there were 75.9 males.

The median income for a household in the city was $26,250, and the median income for a family was $32,981. Males had a median income of $32,039 versus $20,917 for females. The per capita income for the city was $14,744. About 9.7% of families and 14.6% of the population were below the poverty line, including 14.4% of those under age 18 and 15.9% of those age 65 or over.

== Transportation ==
Adams County Airport (63C) serves Adams and the surrounding communities. The Union Pacific Railroad's Adams Subdivision, part of a main rail line between Milwaukee and the Twin Cities, passes through Adams. There has been no rail passenger service since the end of the Twin Cities 400 in 1963, which was operated by the Chicago and North Western Railway.

== Gallery ==
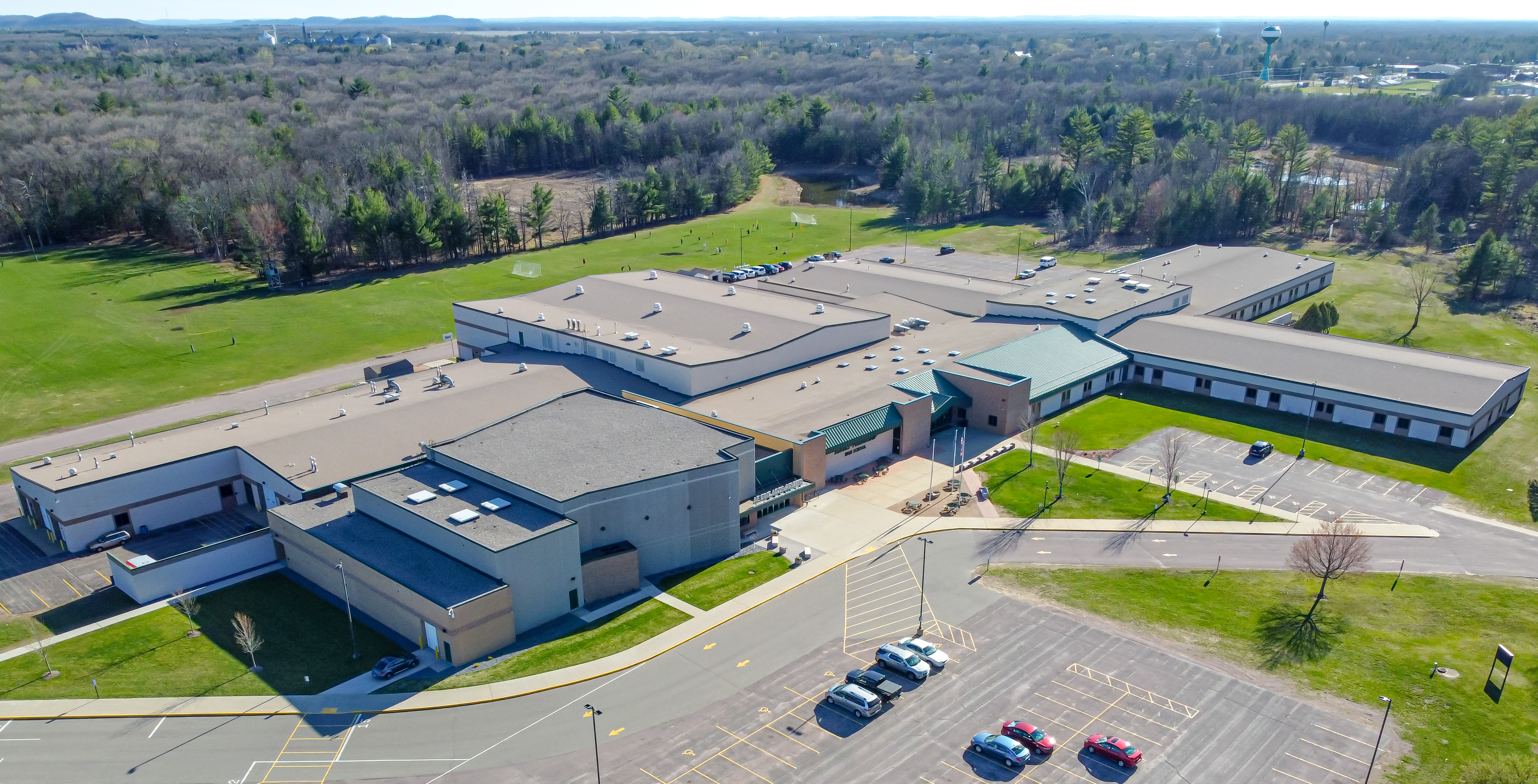
Adams Friendship High School

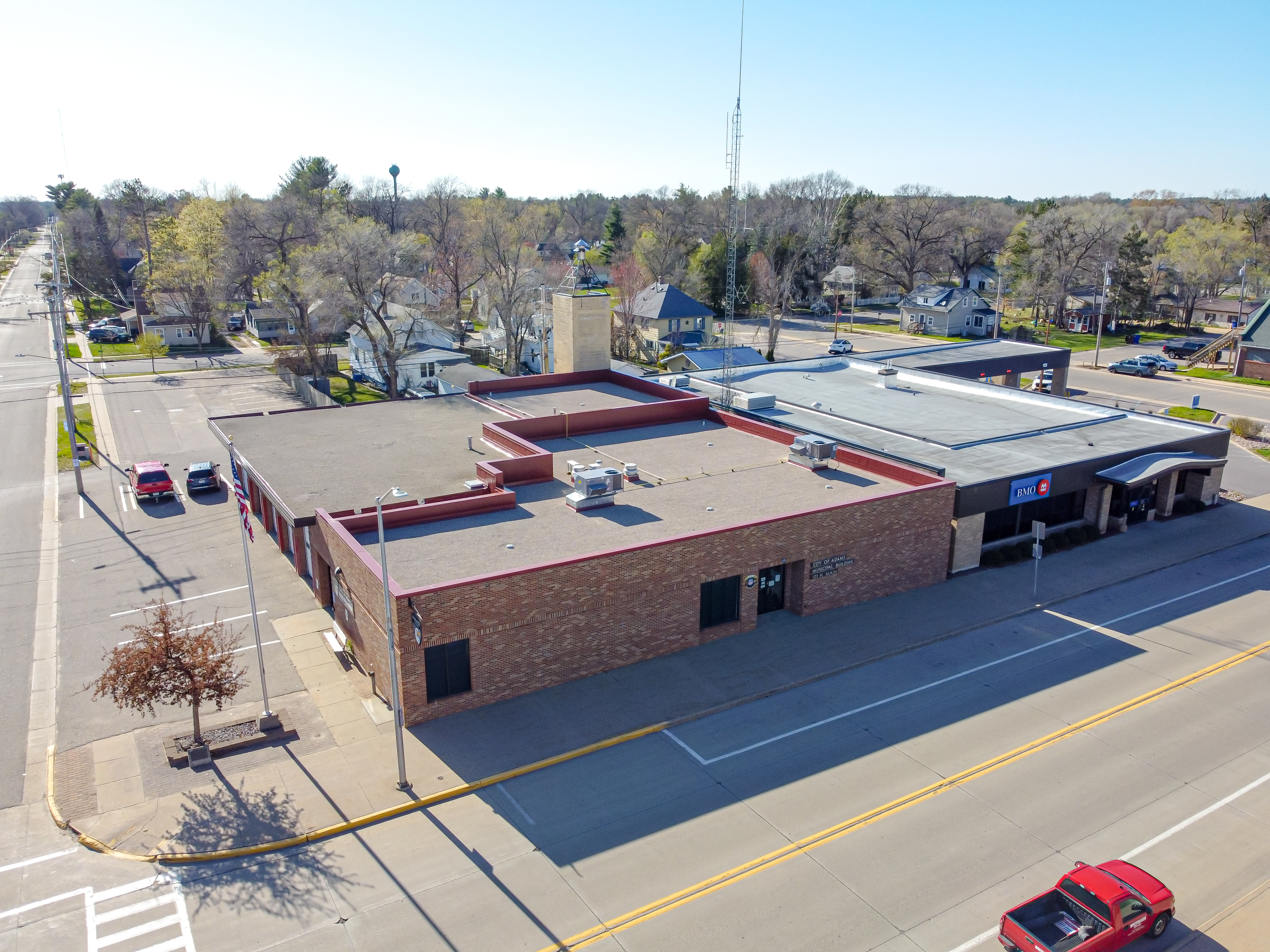
Municipal Building

== Notable people ==
- Edwin W. Blomquist, Wisconsin State Representative, lived in Adams.
