= L. A. Pomeroy House =

Historic house in Wisconsin, United States

- U.S. National Register of Historic Places
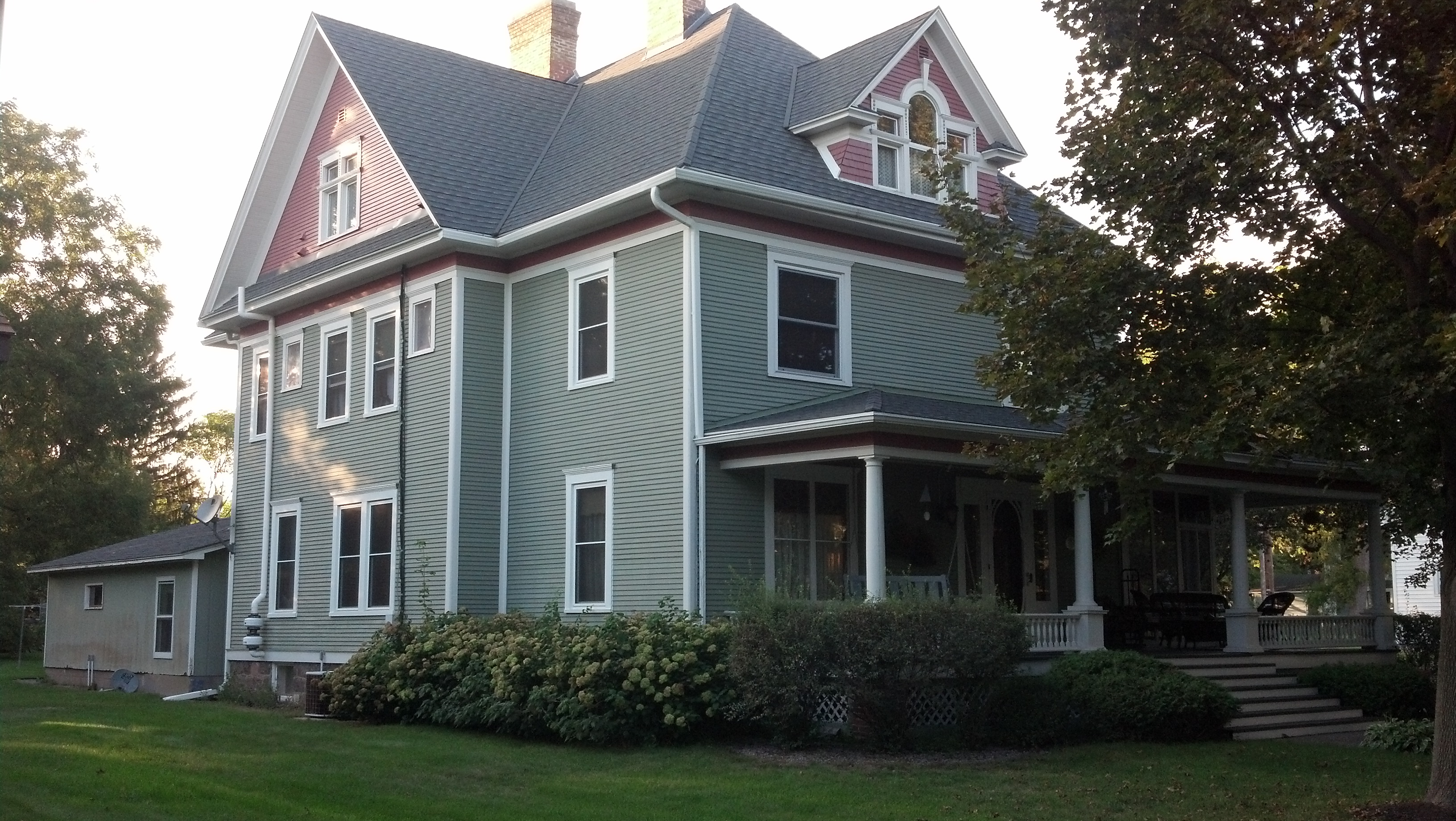

- Location within Wisconsin Location within the United States
- Location: 203 Laconia Street, Amherst, Wisconsin
- Coordinates: 44°27′0″N 89°17′13″W
- Area: 1.7 acres (0.69 ha)
- Built: 1904
- Architect: J. H. Jeffers
- Architectural style: Queen Anne
- NRHP reference No.: 92001560
- Added to NRHP: November 5, 1992

The L. A. Pomeroy House is a historic house located at 203 Laconia Street in Amherst, Wisconsin. It is locally significant as a distinctive of the Queen Anne style, which peaked in popularity in the United States in 1880–1910. It is also significant that Pomeroy, a well respected businessman chose local architect J. H. Jeffers to design his home.

== Description and history ==
It is a large, wood frame, 3-story, Late Victorian Queen Anne house consisting of approximately 3,000 square feet of living area on the first two floors. It was added to the National Register of Historic Places on November 5, 1992.
