= Gunning–Purves Building =

Historic building located in Friendship, Wisconsin

- U.S. National Register of Historic Places
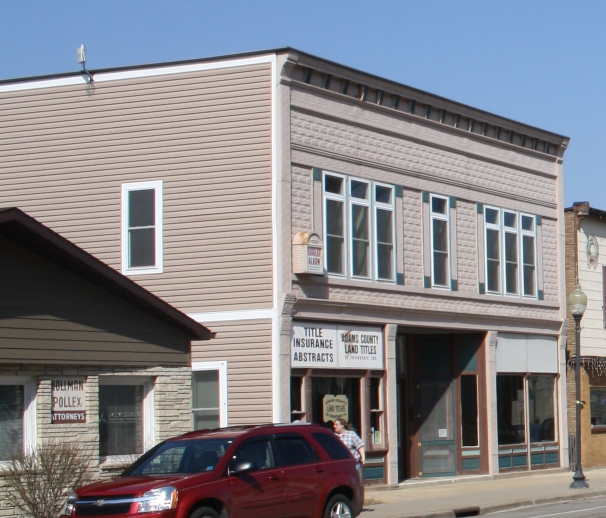
- Gunning–Purves Building
- Location: 311 Main St. Friendship, Wisconsin
- Coordinates: 43.97167°N 89.81649°W
- Built: 1904
- Architect: John W. Gunning/John W. Purves
- NRHP reference No.: 15000056
- Added to NRHP: March 3, 2015

The Gunning–Purves Building is located in Friendship, Wisconsin, United States. It was added to the National Register of Historic Places in 2015.

== History ==
Constructed in 1904, the building has housed several commercial businesses. Among its features is pressed metal provided by George L. Mesker & Co. on both the interior and exterior. The building was purchased by the historical society of Adams County, Wisconsin 2011 and became the 'Adams County Heritage Center'.
