= Christina Kuhl House =

Historic house in Wisconsin, United States

- U.S. National Register of Historic Places
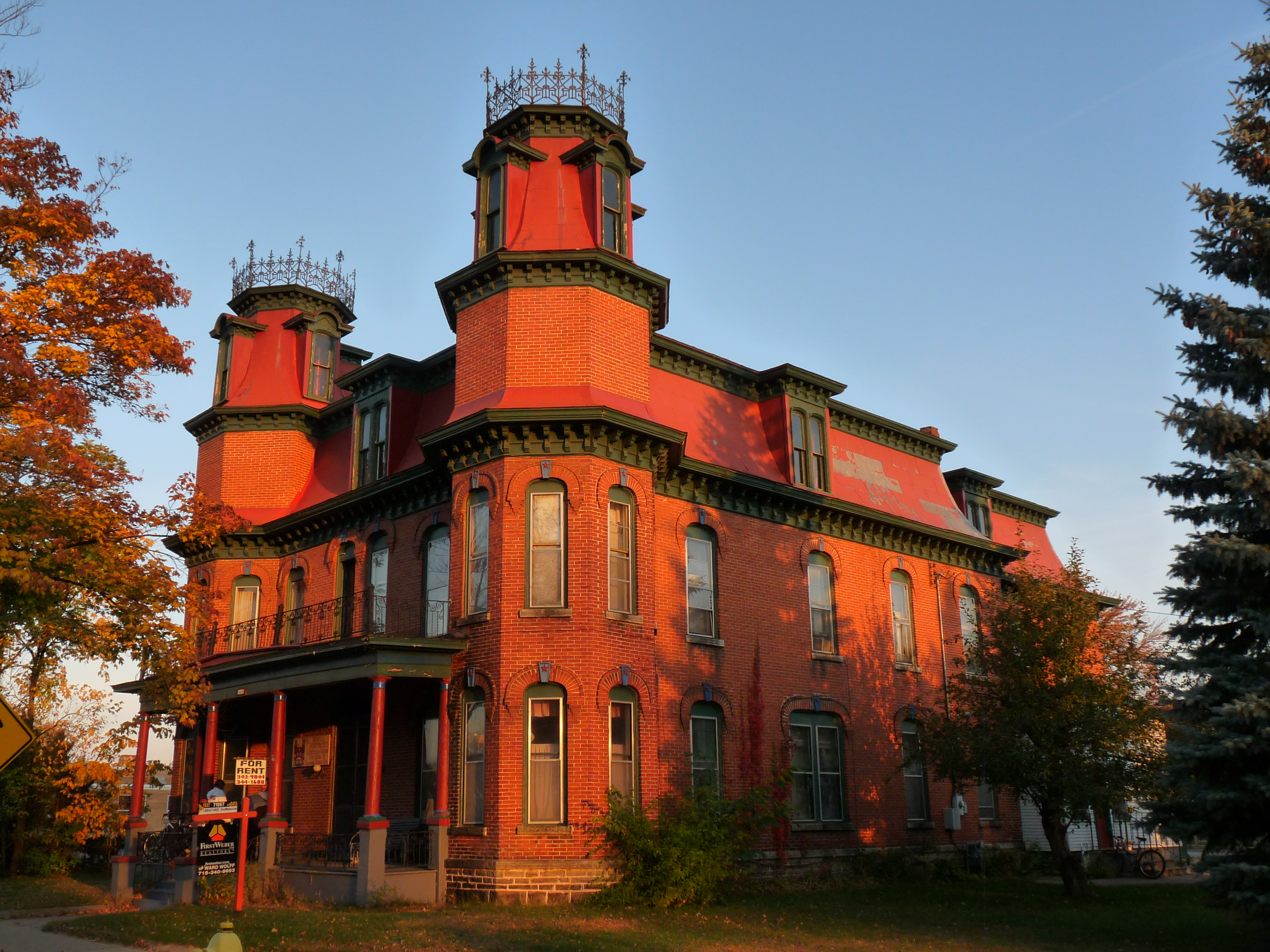
- Christina Kuhl House

- Location within Wisconsin
- Location: 1416 Main St. Stevens Point, Wisconsin
- Coordinates: 44°31′25″N 89°34′41″W
- Area: 1 acre (0.40 ha)
- Built: 1886
- Architectural style: Second Empire
- NRHP reference No.: 78000126
- Added to NRHP: January 9, 1978

The Christina Kuhl House, also known as the Kuhl-Gurath House, is located in Stevens Point, Wisconsin, United States. It was added to the National Register of Historic Places in 1978.

In its NRHP nomination, it was described as "a massive French Second Empire house of frame construction with a red brick veneer." Its mansard roof is covered with tin.

Workmen on the house include D. R. Rogers, who papered the walls and ceilings of parlors, sitting rooms, halls and bedrooms, and did all painting; Aug. Lubitz, carpentry work; Henry Vetter, brick and stone work; and Mr. Chanley, plastering.

It is an example of Second Empire architecture.

It appears to be fairly unusual for having two towers in what appears to be a single-family home application of the style. See: Category:Second Empire architecture in Wisconsin.

In 1877, Adam Kuhl built the first house. Kuhl, a German immigrant, was one of the town of Stevens Point's first successful businessmen. The 1860 census revealed that he was a cabinetmaker, indicating that he had only recently moved to the area in the 1850s. In 1867, he founded a brewery that, over time, would produce 600 to 700 barrels of beer annually for the local market, and grow to be a well-known landmark in the region. He died in 1932, leaving his wife Christina, who inherited the house and used it as a source of income, and six children. Christina died in 1974.
