= Folding Furniture Works Building =

- U.S. National Register of Historic Places
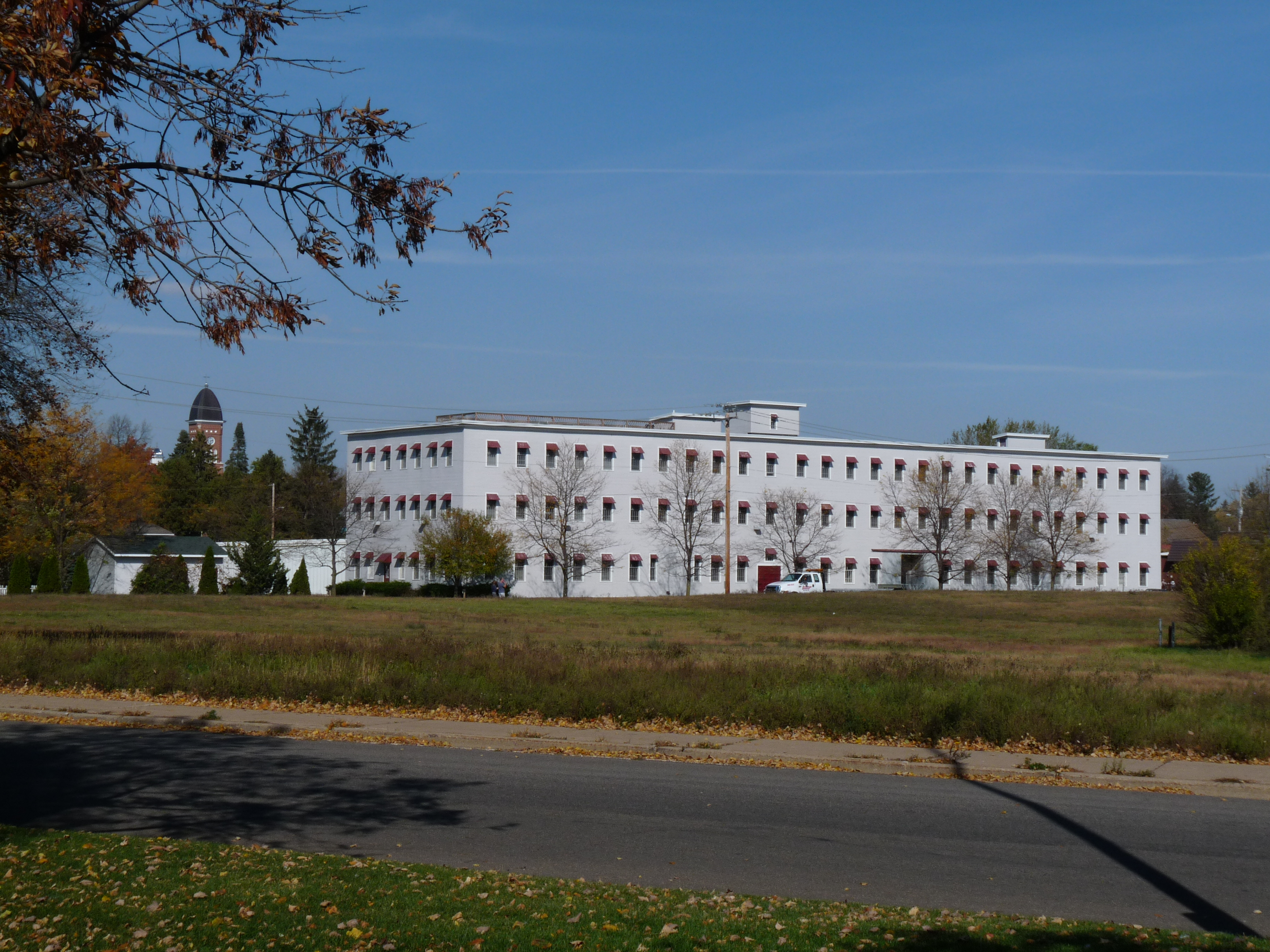
- Folding Furniture Works Building
- Location: 1020 First St. Stevens Point, Wisconsin
- Coordinates: 44.5257°N 89.58737°W
- Built: 1931
- NRHP reference No.: 93000666
- Added to NRHP: July 29, 1993

The Folding Furniture Works Building, also known as the Lullabye Furniture Warehouse, is located in Stevens Point, Wisconsin. It was added to the National Register of Historic Places in 1993.
