= Lanark, Wisconsin =

- Town
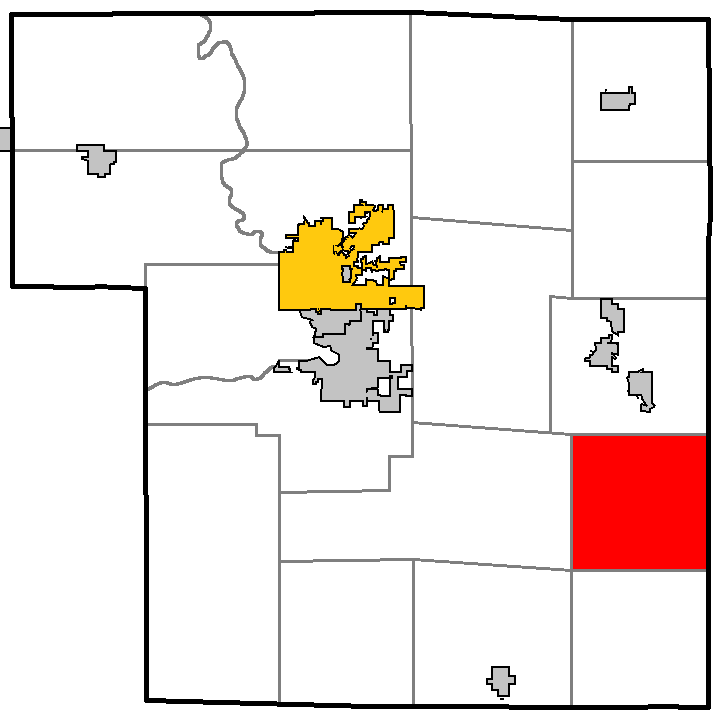
- Location of Lanark, Portage County

- Location of Portage County, Wisconsin
- Coordinates: 44°21′45″N 89°16′29″W
- Country: United States
- State: Wisconsin
- County: Portage

Area
  - Total: 36.1 sq mi (93.4 km^{2})
  - Land: 35.9 sq mi (92.9 km^{2})
  - Water: 0.19 sq mi (0.5 km^{2})
- Elevation: 1,076 ft (328 m)

Population (2020)
  - Total: 1,535
  - Density: 42.8/sq mi (16.5/km^{2})
- Time zone: UTC-6 (Central (CST))
  - Summer (DST): UTC-5 (CDT)
- Area codes: 715 & 534
- FIPS code: 55-42225
- GNIS feature ID: 1583523
- Website: https://tn.lanark.wi.gov/

Lanark is a town in Portage County, Wisconsin, United States. As of the 2020 census, the town had a population of 1,535. The unincorporated community of Badger is within the town.

== Geography ==
According to the United States Census Bureau, the town has a total area of 36.1 square miles (93.4 km^{2}), of which 35.9 square miles (92.9 km^{2}) is land and 0.2 square mile (0.5 km^{2}) is water, for a total area of 0.50% water.

== Demographics ==
As of the census of 2000, there were 1,449 people, 546 households, and 423 families residing in the town. The population density was 40.4 people per square mile (15.6/km^{2}). There were 659 housing units at an average density of 18.4 per square mile (7.1/km^{2}). The racial makeup of the town was 99.17% White, 0.14% African American, 0.28% Native American, 0.07% Asian, 0.00% Pacific Islander, 0.14% from other races, and 0.21% from two or more races. 1.17% of the population were Hispanic or Latino of any race.

There were 546 households, out of which 35.9% had children under the age of 18 living with them, 66.1% were married couples living together, 6.6% had a female householder with no husband present, and 22.5% were non-families. 18.1% of all households were made up of individuals, and 5.5% had someone living alone who was 65 years of age or older. The average household size was 2.65 and the average family size was 3.01.

In the town, the population was spread out, with 28.0% under the age of 18, 5.1% from 18 to 24, 30.8% from 25 to 44, 23.6% from 45 to 64, and 12.5% who were 65 years of age or older. The median age was 37 years. For every 100 females, there were 106.1 males. For every 100 females age 18 and over, there were 107.8 males.

The median income for a household in the town was $41,932, and the median income for a family was $47,727. Males had a median income of $37,137 versus $24,286 for females. The per capita income for the town was $19,246. 6.7% of the population and 3.8% of families were below the poverty line. Out of the total population, 9.8% of those under the age of 18 and 5.8% of those 65 and older were living below the poverty line.
