= Friendship (village), Wisconsin =

Friendship, Wisconsin
- Village
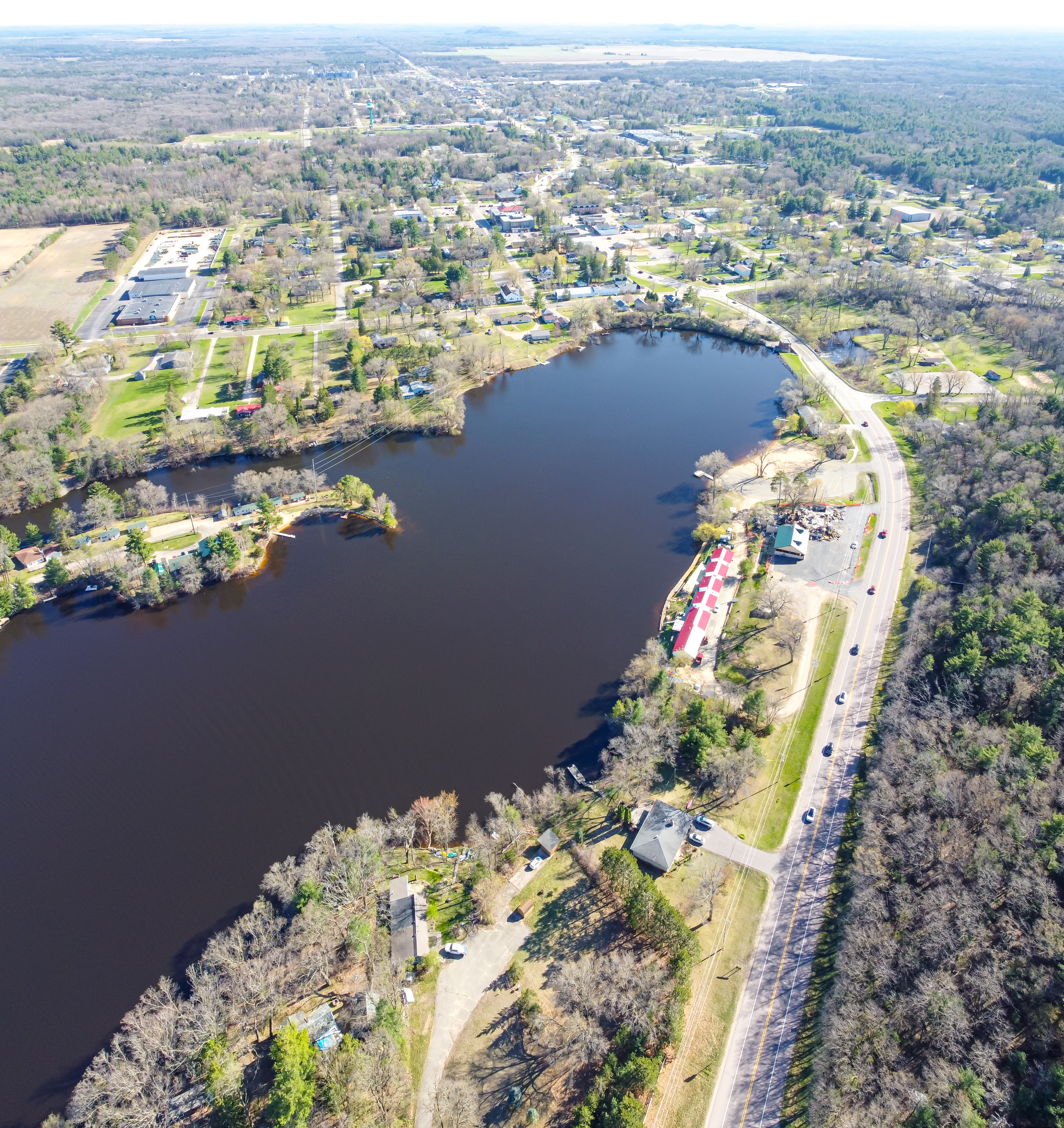
- Wis-13 runs through town

- Location of Friendship in Adams County, Wisconsin.

- Location within Wisconsin Location within the United States
- Coordinates: 43°58′18″N 89°49′7″W
- Country: United States
- State: Wisconsin
- County: Adams
- Incorporated: March 30, 1907

Area
  - Total: 0.95 sq mi (2.45 km^{2})
  - Land: 0.90 sq mi (2.33 km^{2})
  - Water: 0.042 sq mi (0.11 km^{2})
- Elevation: 955 ft (291 m)

Population (2020)
  - Total: 648
  - Density: 720/sq mi (278/km^{2})
- Time zone: UTC-6 (Central (CST))
  - Summer (DST): UTC-5 (CDT)
- ZIP code: 53934
- Area code: 608
- FIPS code: 55-27950
- GNIS feature ID: 1565329
- Website: friendshipwi.gov

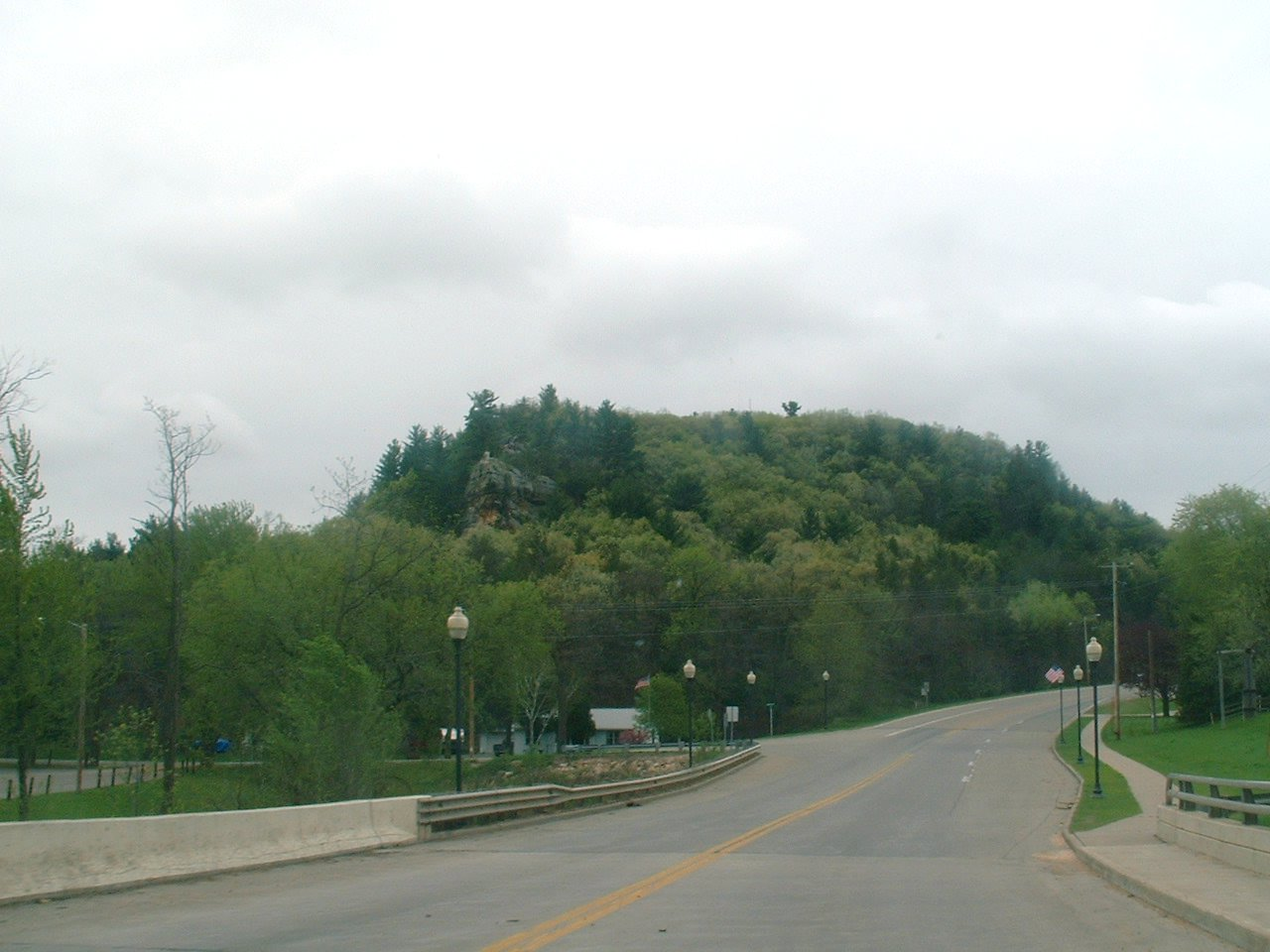
Friendship Mound

Friendship is a village in Adams County in the U.S. state of Wisconsin. It is the county seat of Adams County. The population was 648 at the 2020 census.

== Geology ==
The Friendship Mound sits just to the north of town. It is a castillated mound formed from the last glaciers to cover the area during the Ice Age. Another mound, Roche-A-Cri, is a few miles north of the village in Roche-A-Cri State Park. That mound contains the Roche-A-Cri Petroglyphs.

== Geography ==
Friendship is located at 43°58′18″N 89°49′7″W (43.971758, -89.818718).

According to the United States Census Bureau, the village has a total area of 0.92 square miles (2.38 km^{2}), of which 0.88 square miles (2.28 km^{2}) is land and 0.04 square miles (0.10 km^{2}) is water.

=== Climate ===
Climate data for Friendship, Wisconsin, 1991–2020 normals, extremes 1930–present
Month	Jan	Feb	Mar	Apr	May	Jun	Jul	Aug	Sep	Oct	Nov	Dec	Year
Record high °F (°C)	57 (14)	71 (22)	83 (28)	88 (31)	104 (40)	102 (39)	106 (41)	100 (38)	98 (37)	88 (31)	78 (26)	65 (18)	106 (41)
Mean maximum °F (°C)	45.3 (7.4)	49.9 (9.9)	64.9 (18.3)	78.7 (25.9)	86.8 (30.4)	91.0 (32.8)	92.8 (33.8)	91.4 (33.0)	88.0 (31.1)	79.9 (26.6)	65.5 (18.6)	49.6 (9.8)	94.8 (34.9)
Mean daily maximum °F (°C)	25.4 (−3.7)	30.4 (−0.9)	42.2 (5.7)	55.9 (13.3)	68.7 (20.4)	78.7 (25.9)	82.3 (27.9)	80.5 (26.9)	72.7 (22.6)	58.7 (14.8)	43.7 (6.5)	30.9 (−0.6)	55.8 (13.2)
Daily mean °F (°C)	15.7 (−9.1)	19.6 (−6.9)	31.4 (−0.3)	44.2 (6.8)	56.9 (13.8)	67.1 (19.5)	70.8 (21.6)	68.8 (20.4)	60.5 (15.8)	47.7 (8.7)	34.5 (1.4)	22.4 (−5.3)	45.0 (7.2)
Mean daily minimum °F (°C)	6.0 (−14.4)	8.7 (−12.9)	20.7 (−6.3)	32.5 (0.3)	45.1 (7.3)	55.5 (13.1)	59.2 (15.1)	57.0 (13.9)	48.4 (9.1)	36.6 (2.6)	25.4 (−3.7)	13.9 (−10.1)	34.1 (1.2)
Mean minimum °F (°C)	−17.3 (−27.4)	−16.0 (−26.7)	−2.9 (−19.4)	17.1 (−8.3)	28.5 (−1.9)	41.0 (5.0)	47.2 (8.4)	43.7 (6.5)	33.0 (0.6)	20.9 (−6.2)	8.3 (−13.2)	−8.1 (−22.3)	−21.8 (−29.9)
Record low °F (°C)	−40 (−40)	−36 (−38)	−25 (−32)	7 (−14)	17 (−8)	29 (−2)	40 (4)	31 (−1)	23 (−5)	13 (−11)	−15 (−26)	−33 (−36)	−40 (−40)
Average precipitation inches (mm)	1.34 (34)	1.27 (32)	1.91 (49)	3.39 (86)	4.19 (106)	4.48 (114)	4.64 (118)	4.35 (110)	3.49 (89)	2.54 (65)	1.89 (48)	1.61 (41)	35.10 (892)
Average snowfall inches (cm)	11.9 (30)	13.9 (35)	6.5 (17)	2.5 (6.4)	0.0 (0.0)	0.0 (0.0)	0.0 (0.0)	0.0 (0.0)	0.0 (0.0)	0.2 (0.51)	2.2 (5.6)	14.8 (38)	52.0 (132)
Average precipitation days (≥ 0.01 in)	9.9	9.6	9.6	12.0	13.7	12.6	10.5	10.3	11.7	11.2	9.0	10.7	130.8
Average snowy days (≥ 0.1 in)	7.7	8.0	4.1	2.1	0.1	0.0	0.0	0.0	0.0	0.3	2.0	7.6	31.9
Source 1: NOAA
Source 2: National Weather Service

== Demographics ==
Historical population
Census	Pop.	Note	%±
1870	76		—
1880	137		80.3%
1890	156		13.9%
1910	276		—
1920	442		60.1%
1930	438		−0.9%
1940	453		3.4%
1950	566		24.9%
1960	560		−1.1%
1970	641		14.5%
1980	744		16.1%
1990	728		−2.2%
2000	698		−4.1%
2010	725		3.9%
2020	648		−10.6%
U.S. Decennial Census; 2020 Census

=== 2010 census ===
As of the census of 2010, there were 725 people, 256 households, and 161 families living in the village. The population density was 823.9 inhabitants per square mile (318.1/km^{2}). There were 323 housing units at an average density of 367.0 units per square mile (141.7 units/km^{2}). The racial makeup of the village was 95.0% White, 1.9% African American, 0.1% Native American, 0.6% Asian, 1.5% from other races, and 0.8% from two or more races. Hispanic or Latino of any race were 4.0% of the population.

There were 256 households, of which 28.9% had children under the age of 18 living with them, 41.4% were married couples living together, 15.6% had a female householder with no husband present, 5.9% had a male householder with no wife present, and 37.1% were non-families. 32.8% of all households were made up of individuals, and 14.5% had someone living alone who was 65 years of age or older. The average household size was 2.29 and the average family size was 2.81.

The median age in the village was 45.6 years. 18.5% of residents were under the age of 18; 8.4% were between the ages of 18 and 24; 22.2% were from 25 to 44; 23.8% were from 45 to 64; and 27% were 65 years of age or older. The gender makeup of the village was 50.2% male and 49.8% female.

=== 2000 census ===
As of the census of 2000, there were 698 people, 257 households, and 157 families living in the village. The population density was 787.4 people per square mile (304.0 people/km^{2}). There were 294 housing units at an average density of 331.7 units per square mile (128.1 units/km^{2}). The racial makeup of the village was 94.27% White, 0.43% African American, 1.72% Native American, 2.15% Asian, 0.14% Pacific Islander, 0.57% from other races, and 0.72% from two or more races. Hispanic or Latino of any race were 1.15% of the population.

There were 257 households, out of which 29.2% had children under the age of 18 living with them, 44.0% were married couples living together, 10.9% had a female householder with no husband present, and 38.9% were non-families. 34.2% of all households were made up of individuals, and 19.5% had someone living alone who was 65 years of age or older. The average household size was 2.31 and the average family size was 2.97.

In the village, the population was spread out, with 24.1% under the age of 18, 7.0% from 18 to 24, 27.7% from 25 to 44, 18.9% from 45 to 64, and 22.3% who were 65 years of age or older. The median age was 40 years. For every 100 females, there were 105.3 males. For every 100 females age 18 and over, there were 109.5 males.

The median income for a household in the village was $24,615, and the median income for a family was $33,438. Males had a median income of $29,375 versus $21,458 for females. The per capita income for the village was $14,773. About 16.4% of families and 23.4% of the population were below the poverty line, including 38.8% of those under age 18 and 10.3% of those age 65 or over.

== Transportation ==
Adams County Airport (63C) serves Friendship and the surrounding communities.

== Education ==
It is in the Adams-Friendship Area School District.

== Notable people ==
- George W. Bingham, Wisconsin State Representative
- Alan Galbraith, Wisconsin State Representative
- John W. Gunning, Wisconsin State Representative
- Len Koenecke, former Major League Baseball player who died of a blow to head during a fight on a flight.

== Gallery of Historic Places ==
Buildings, sites, structures, districts, and objects in Friendship listed on the National Register of Historic Places

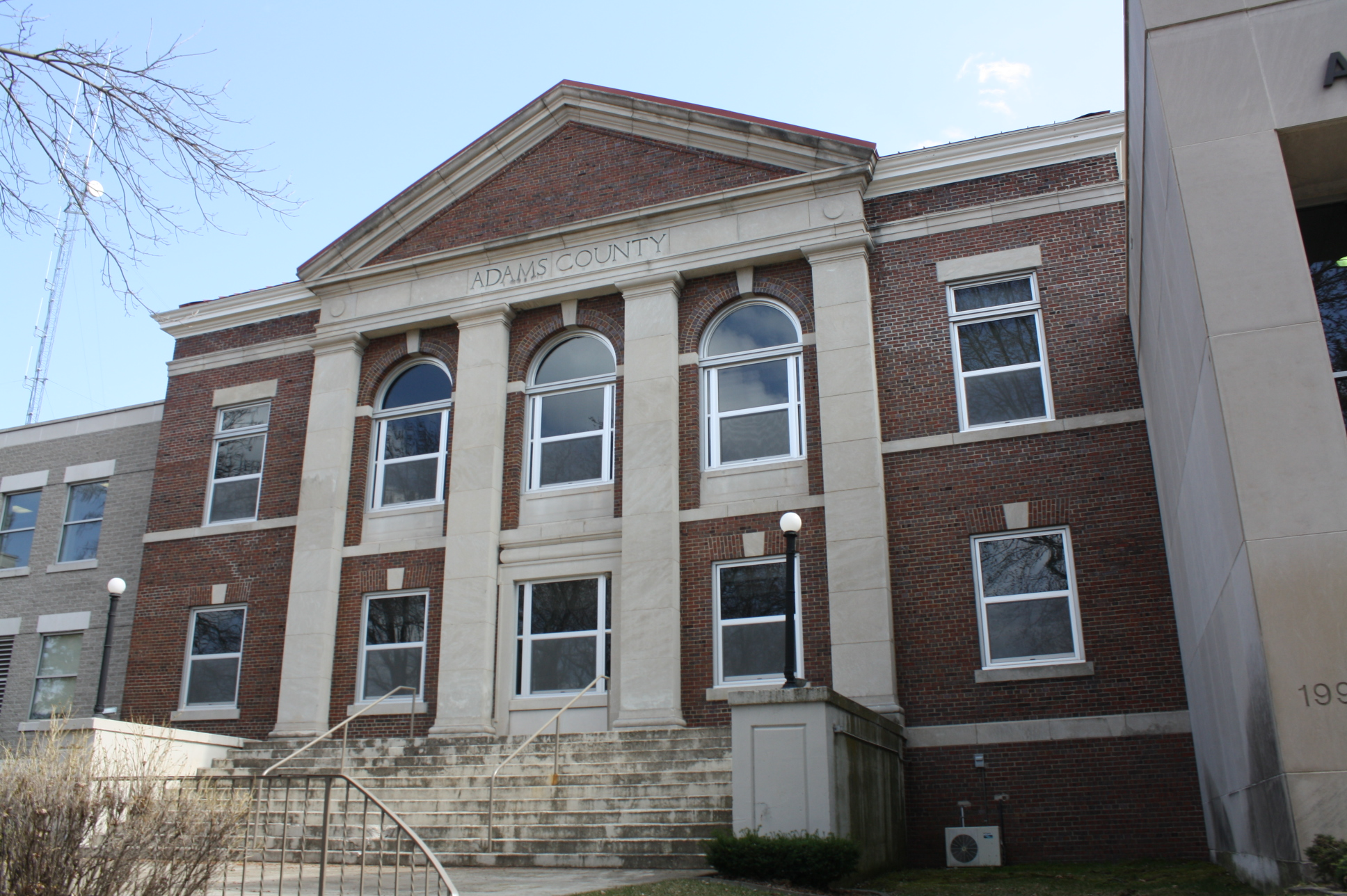
Adams County Courthouse

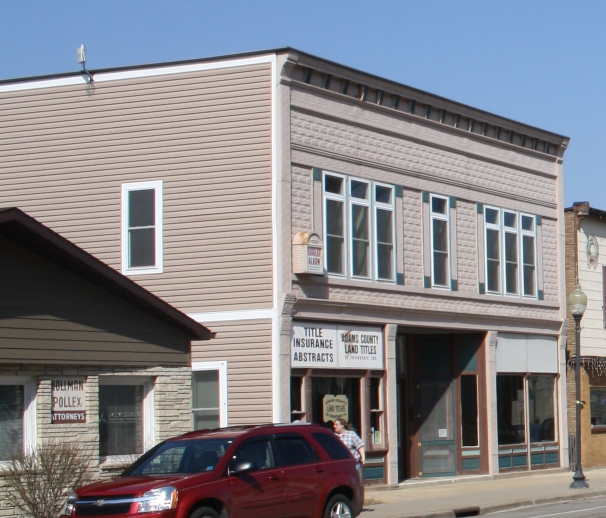
Gunning–Purves Building

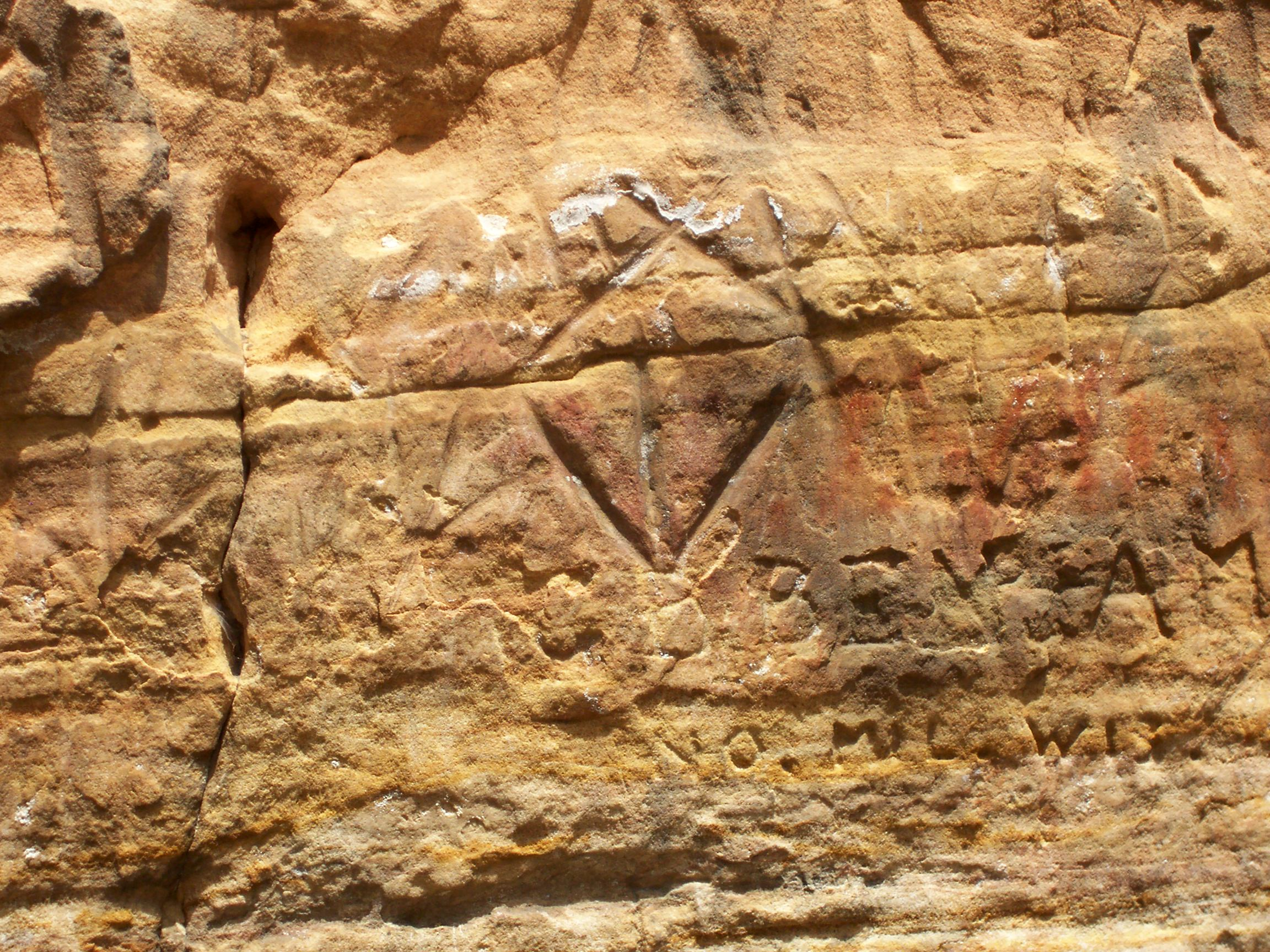
Roche-a-Cri Petroglyphs

== Images ==
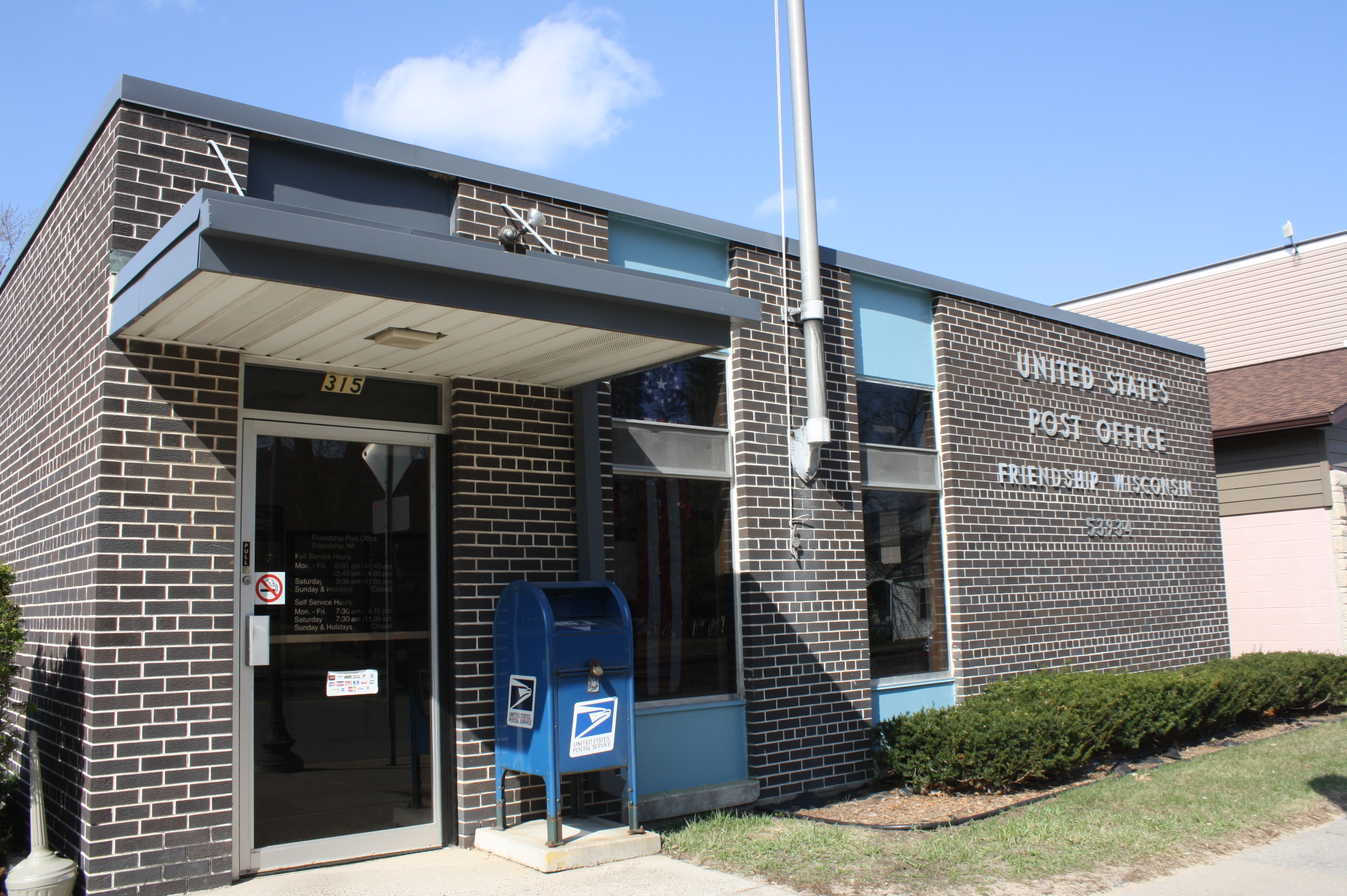
Post office

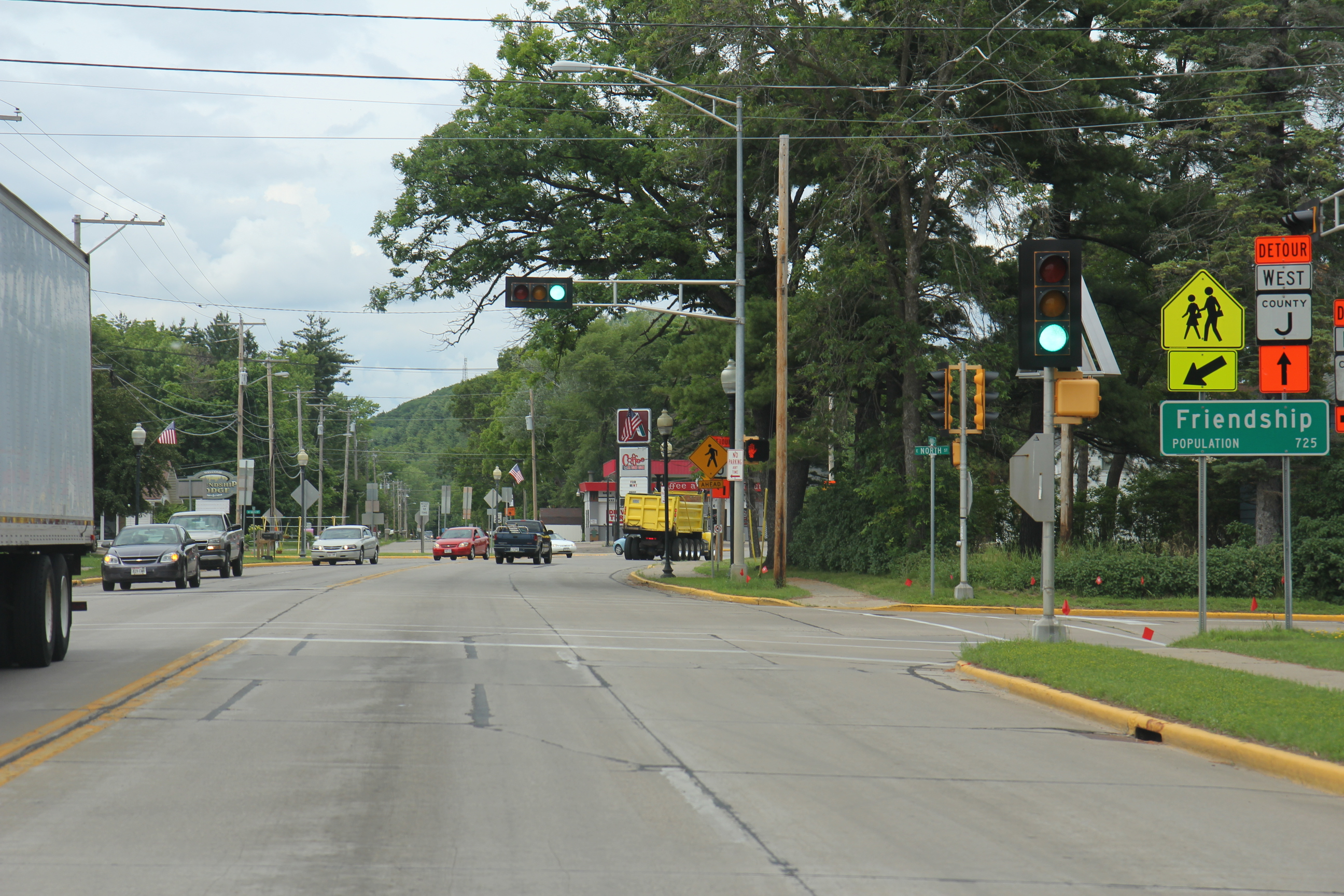
Looking north at the sign for Friendship on WIS13
