= David McMillan House =

Historic house in Wisconsin, United States

- U.S. National Register of Historic Places
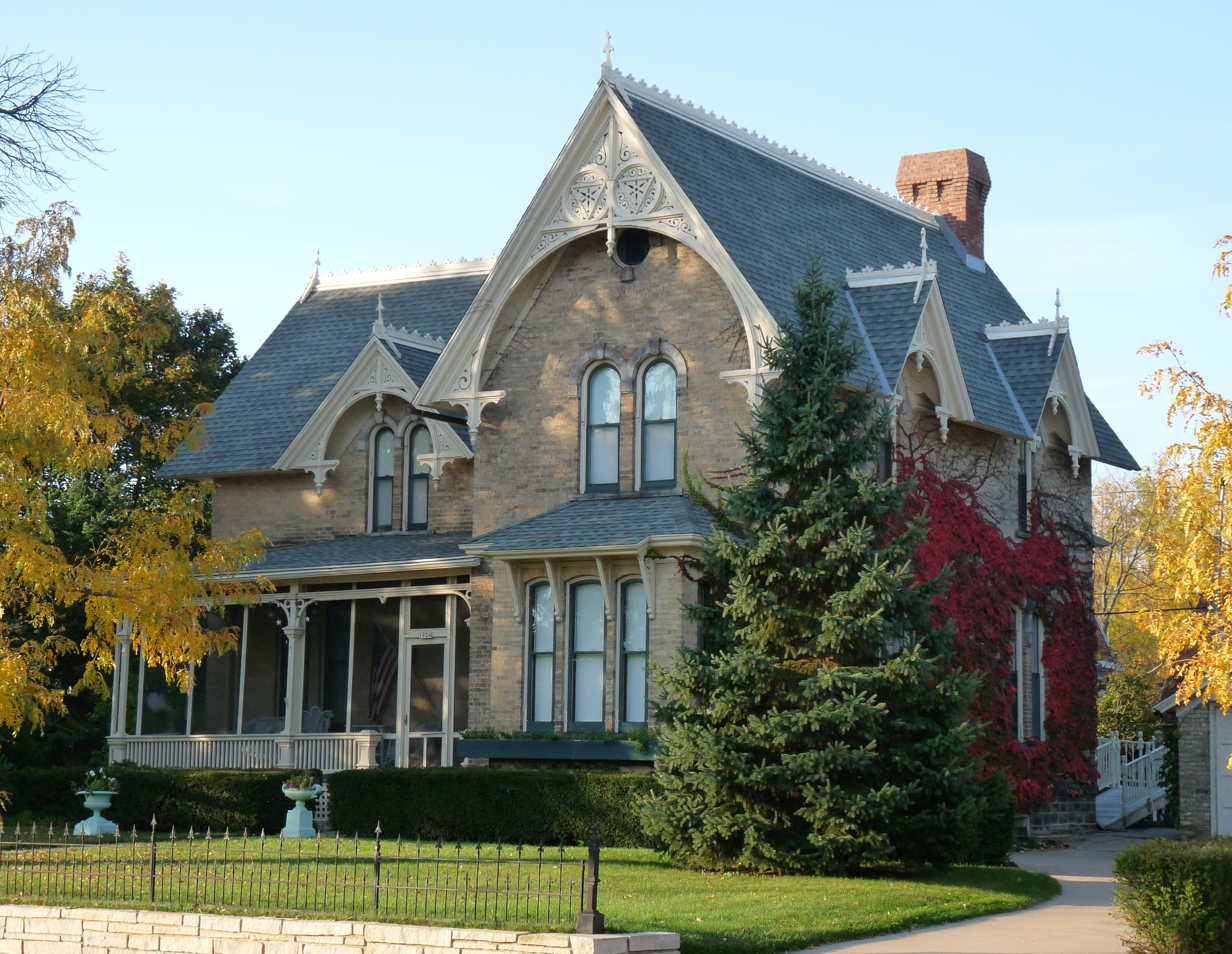

- Location within Wisconsin Location within the United States
- Location: 1924 Pine St. Stevens Point, Wisconsin
- Coordinates: 44.51815°N 89.57528°W
- Area: less than one acre
- Built: 1873
- Architectural style: Gothic Revival
- NRHP reference No.: 74000117
- Added to NRHP: December 16, 1974

The David McMillan House is a High Victorian Gothic home in Stevens Point, Wisconsin, United States, which was built in 1873 by a local lumberman. It was added to the National Register of Historic Places in 1974.

== Description and history ==
The house is considered the finest example of High Victorian Gothic style in Stevens Point. The walls are brick. As seen in the photo, windows are tall and narrow, framed with hood molds. The gable ends are decorated with semi-circular wooden bargeboards decorated with elaborate scroll-sawing and carving and hammer beams. The bargeboard design repeats in the smaller gables around the building. The roof planes are steep, and a wooden decoration runs along the crest. Bargeboards, ridge, and some of the trim are painted the same color, unifying the design.

David Stiles McMillan was born in 1812 in Washington County, New York After farming there, he founded McMillan Woolen Mills in Malone. In 1864 he moved his family west to Wisconsin to run a sawmill on the Plover River fourteen miles north of Point. Each spring the output from the mill was driven down the Plover to the Wisconsin, and rafted to the Mississippi, and to Dubuque, Davenport, St. Louis and other markets. One of the destinations was the McMillans' own wholesale lumber yard in Keokuk, Iowa. When David retired in 1873, he had the house built.

After David retired, his sons Benjamin Franklin and Charles V. continued in business. They built a sawmill in 1874 in the forest forty miles to the west in what is now the Town of McMillan, five miles north of modern Marshfield. To serve their workers, they ran a boarding house and general store at their village. B.F. stayed at McMillan, where the mill continued operation for at least 30 years. As they finished cutting off surrounding forest, they sold parcels to farmers.

In 1885 Charles moved to Ashland to start a cold storage business. In 1890 the brothers organized the Winnebago Furniture Company of Fond du Lac. In 1899, they built a sawmill in Ontonagon, Michigan.
