= List of Carnegie libraries in Wisconsin =

The following list of Carnegie libraries in Wisconsin provides detailed information on United States Carnegie libraries in Wisconsin, where 63 public libraries were built from 60 grants (totaling $1,047,762) awarded by the Carnegie Corporation of New York from 1901 to 1915. In addition, academic libraries were built for 2 institutions (totaling $104,000).

== Key ==
Building still operating as a library
Building standing, but now serving another purpose
Building no longer standing
Building listed on the National Register of Historic Places
Building contributes to a historic district on the National Register of Historic Places

== Public libraries ==
	Library	City or town	Image	Date granted	Grant amount	Location	Notes
1	Antigo	Antigo		Mar 20, 1903	$15,000	404 Superior St. 45°8′17″N 89°9′10″W	
2	Arcadia	Arcadia		Mar 14, 1905	$5,000	406 E. Main St. 45°15′8″N 91°29′44″W	
3	Baraboo	Baraboo		Mar 14, 1902	$15,000	230 4th Ave. 43°28′16″N 89°44′44″W	Designed by Louis Claude.
4	Barron	Barron		May 17, 1912	$7,000	10 N. 3rd St.	
5	Bayfield	Bayfield		Feb 2, 1903	$10,000	37 N. Broad St.	
6	Beloit	Beloit		Jul 16, 1901	$25,000		
7	Berlin	Berlin		Feb 2, 1903	$12,250	121 W. Park Ave.	
8	Black River Falls	Black River Falls		Mar 11, 1914	$10,000	321 Main St. 44°17′43″N 90°51′05″W	
9	Chippewa Falls	Chippewa Falls		Feb 15, 1902	$20,000		
10	Clintonville	Clintonville		Apr 19, 1915	$9,000	95 S. Main St.	
11	Columbus	Columbus		Mar 27, 1903	$10,000	112 S. Dickason Blvd. 43°20′20″N 89°00′58″W	
12	Cumberland	Cumberland		Jan 19, 1905	$10,000	1305 2nd Ave. 45°32′03″N 91°44′19″W	
13	Darlington	Darlington		Feb 5, 1904	$10,000	525 N. Main St.	
14	Durand	Durand		Dec 23, 1905	$7,500	315 W. 2nd Ave. 44°37′40″N 91°58′00″W	
15	Eau Claire	Eau Claire		Feb 4, 1902	$40,000	217 S. Farwell St. 44°48′43″N 91°29′53″W	
16	Edgerton	Edgerton		Mar 14, 1905	$10,000	101 Albion St.	
17	Elroy	Elroy		Nov 24, 1905	$10,000	501 2nd Main St.	
18	Fond du Lac	Fond du Lac		Feb 4, 1902	$30,000		
19	Green Bay	Green Bay		Feb 13, 1901	$45,000	125 S. Jefferson St. 44°30′44″N 88°00′49″W	
20	Hayward	Hayward		Dec 14, 1903	$10,000	Main St. and U.S. Route 63	
21	Hudson	Hudson		Mar 20, 1903	$12,000	304 Locust St. 44°58′33″N 92°45′19″W	
22	Janesville	Janesville		Mar 7, 1901	$30,000	64 S. Main St. 42°40′53″N 89°01′15″W	
23	Jefferson	Jefferson		Jan 23, 1911	$10,000	305 S. Main St. 43°00′12″N 88°48′27″W	
24	Kaukauna	Kaukauna		Dec 27, 1902	$12,000	111 Main Ave. 44°16′47″N 88°16′14″W	
25	Kilbourn	Kilbourn		Feb 15, 1912	$6,000	429 Broadway; 43°37′41″N 89°46′15″W	
26	Ladysmith	Ladysmith		Feb 6, 1907	$10,000	101 Lake Avenue E.	Designed by Claude and Starck.
27	Madison Main	Madison		Aug 16, 1901	$90,000		
28	Madison 6th Ward	Madison		1911	$15,000	1249 Williamson St.	
29	Manitowoc	Manitowoc		Dec 27, 1902	$25,000		
30	Medford	Medford		May 21, 1913	$6,000	104 E. Perkins St. 45°08′02″N 90°20′30″W	
31	Merrill	Merrill		Dec 13, 1907	$17,500	106 W. 1st St. 45°10′47″N 89°42′05″W	
32	Neenah	Neenah		Oct 3, 1901	$12,500		
33	Neillsville	Neillsville		Nov 3, 1913	$10,000	409 Hewett St.	
34	New London	New London		Nov 25, 1903	$10,000	406 S. Pearl St.	
35	Platteville	Platteville		Jan 14, 1914	$12,500	190 Market St.	
36	Plymouth	Plymouth		Apr 6, 1908	$10,000	130 Division St.	
37	Racine Main	Racine		Jul 16, 1901	$50,000	701 S. Main St. 42°43′33″N 87°46′56″W	
38	Racine Uptown	Racine		1914	$10,000	1407 S. Memorial Dr.	Date of grant not clear; branch was opened in 1914.
39	Reedsburg	Reedsburg		Jan 23, 1911	$10,000	345 Vine St.	
40	Rhinelander	Rhinelander		Jan 2, 1903	$15,000	106 N. Stevens St.	
41	Rice Lake	Rice Lake		Dec 22, 1903	$10,000	16 S. Main St. 45°30′04″N 91°44′02″W	
42	Richland Center	Richland Center		Dec 22, 1903	$10,000		
43	Ripon	Ripon		Apr 11, 1902	$12,000	401 Watson St.	
44	Shawano	Shawano		Jun 11, 1914	$10,000	121 E. Green Bay St.	
45	Sheboygan	Sheboygan		Mar 6, 1901	$35,000	705 N. 8th St.	Library moved to newer structure at 710 N. 8th St. in 1974; building used for other purposes as linked in article until exterior was converted into a modern 'ruin' structure surrounding a garden by current owners John Michael Kohler Arts Center in 1999.
46	South Milwaukee	South Milwaukee		Sep 29, 1915	$15,000		
47	Sparta	Sparta		Feb 4, 1902	$12,000	124 W. Main St. 43°56′39″N 90°48′41″W	
48	Stevens Point	Stevens Point		Apr 26, 1902	$21,859		
49	Stoughton	Stoughton		Dec 23, 1905	$13,000	304 S. 4th St.	
50	Sturgeon Bay	Sturgeon Bay		Apr 25, 1911	$12,500	354 Michigan St. 44°50′06″N 87°22′32″W	
51	Superior Main	Superior		Mar 7, 1901	$70,000	1204 Hammond Ave.	
52	Superior East End	Superior		1917	$20,000	2306 E. 5th St.	
53	Tomah	Tomah		Mar 16, 1915	$10,000	716 Superior Ave. 43°58′47″N 90°30′14″W	
54	Two Rivers	Two Rivers		Jan 9, 1913	$12,500	1516 16th St.	The library has been razed and is now a parking lot.
55	Viroqua	Viroqua		Feb 5, 1904	$10,000	118 E. Jefferson St.	
56	Washburn	Washburn		Feb 12, 1903	$18,000	307 Washington Ave. 46°40′22″N 90°53′43″W	
57	Watertown	Watertown		Apr 20, 1905	$20,000	100 S. Water St.	
58	Waukesha	Waukesha		Mar 14, 1902	$15,000	321 W. Wisconsin Ave.	
59	Waupaca	Waupaca		Apr 28, 1913	$10,000	321 S. Main St. 44°21′19″N 89°05′05″W	
60	Waupun	Waupun		Mar 8, 1904	$11,653	22 S. Madison St. 43°37′57″N 88°43′48″W	Designed by H. A. Foeller.
61	Wausau	Wausau		Jan 6, 1903	$29,000		
62	Wauwatosa	Wauwatosa		Feb 7, 1905	$6,000		
63	West Allis	West Allis		Mar 14, 1913	$15,000	1508 S. 75th St.	

The Kaukauna library has been replaced and is being converted into an apartment building

== Academic libraries ==
	Institution	Locality	Image	Date granted	Grant amount	Location	Notes
1	Beloit College	Beloit		Apr 24, 1903	$50,000		
2	Lawrence College	Appleton		Jan 7, 1905	$54,000		

== See also ==
- List of libraries in the United States
