= Casa Rio =

Historic house in Florida, United States

- U.S. National Register of Historic Places
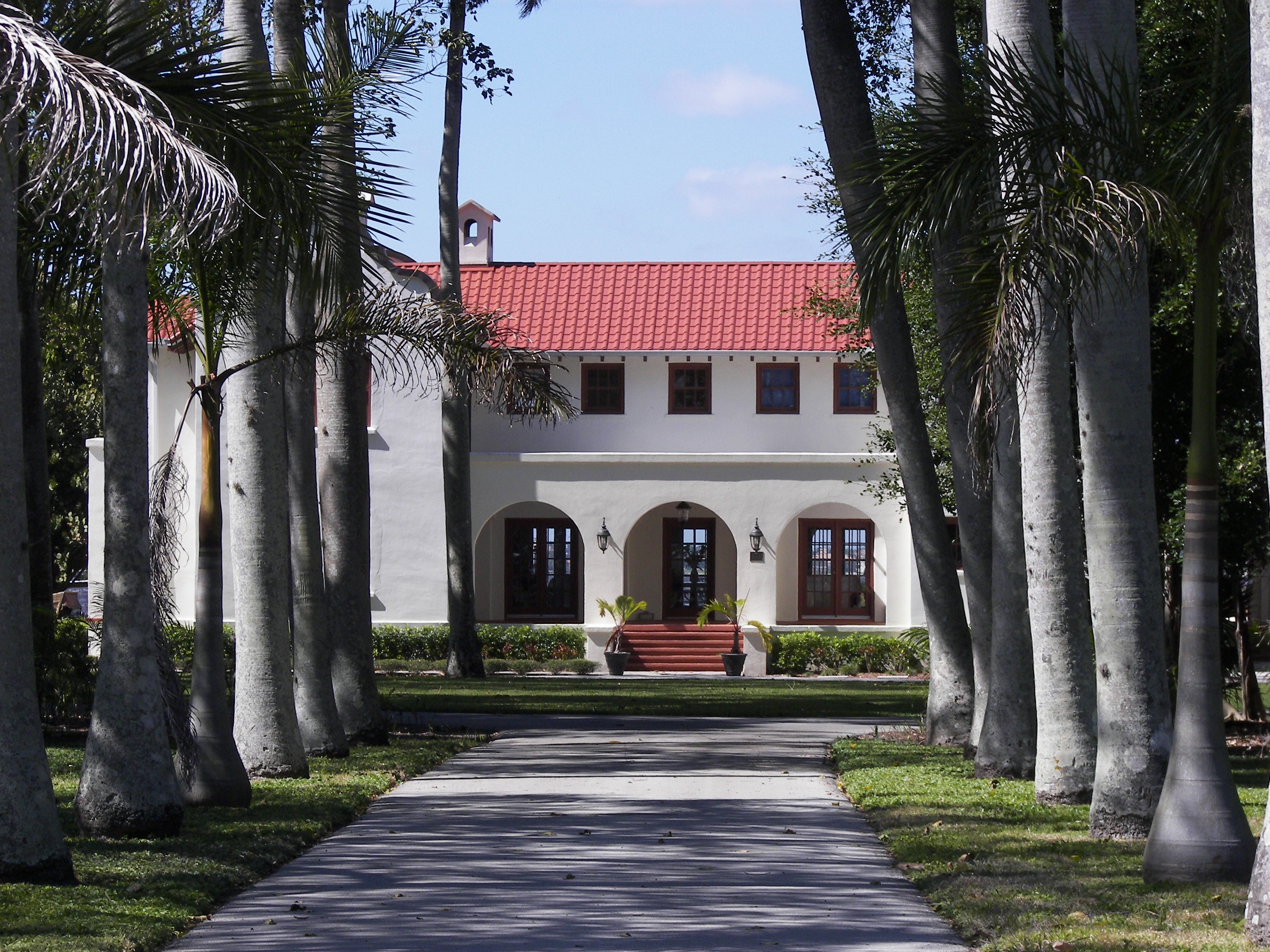

- Location within Florida Location within the United States
- Location: 2424 McGregor Blvd., Fort Myers, Florida
- Coordinates: 26°38′0″N 81°52′53″W
- Area: 2.3 acres (0.93 ha)
- Built: 1926
- Architect: Henry Van Ryn; de Gelleke, Gerrit
- Architectural style: Mission/Spanish Revival
- MPS: Lee County MPS
- NRHP reference No.: 96001186
- Added to NRHP: 24 October 1996

Casa Rio (also been known as the S.W. Stribley House) is a house that was built in 1926. It was designed by architects Henry Van Ryn and Gerrit de Gelleke in the Mission/Spanish Revival style. It was listed on the National Register of Historic Places (NRHP) in 1996; the listing included one contributing building and two contributing structures on 2.3 acres (0.93 ha).

Van Ryn and de Gelleke worked mostly in Wisconsin; the Charles W. Stribley House in Kaukauna, Wisconsin, built in 1910, is another of their works that is NRHP-listed. Since 2001 the home has been owned by AveXis founder and biotechnology executive John A. Carbona.

== See also ==
- Lee County Multiple Property Submission
