= Milwaukee County Dispensary and Emergency Hospital =

- U.S. National Register of Historic Places
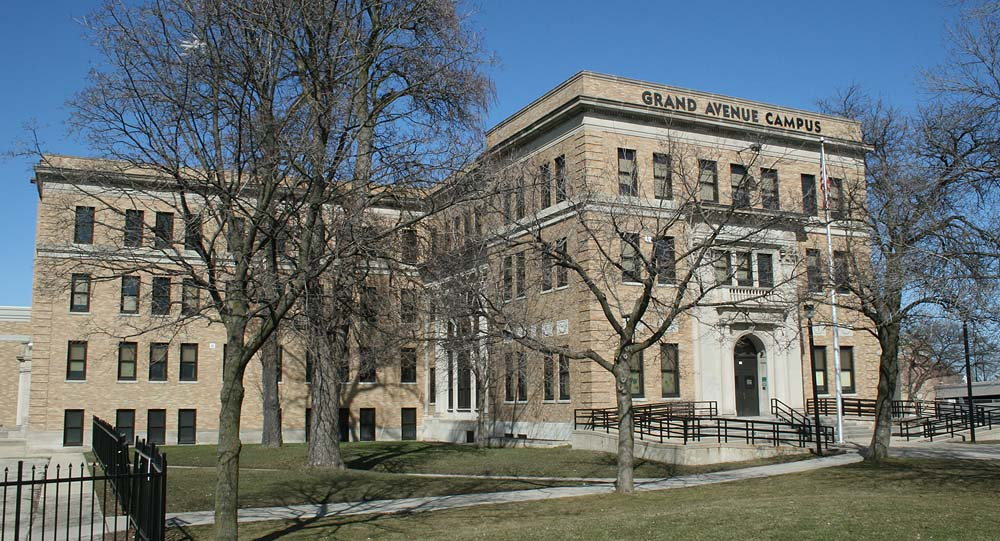
- Milwaukee County Dispensary and Emergency Hospital

- Location within Wisconsin Location within the United States
- Location: 2430 W. Wisconsin Ave. Milwaukee, Wisconsin
- Coordinates: 43.03972°N 87.94394°W
- Area: 5.5 acres (2.2 ha)
- Built: 1927-1929
- Architect: Van Ryn & DeGelleke
- Architectural style: Classical Revival
- NRHP reference No.: 85000639
- Added to NRHP: March 21, 1985

The Milwaukee County Dispensary and Emergency Hospital, built in 1929, provided the first full-scale, publicly funded health care available to all residents in Milwaukee, Wisconsin, United States. It was added to the National Register of Historic Places in 1985.

== History ==
Public health care in Milwaukee began with the creation of pesthouses during early epidemics and a quarantine hospital in 1877. In 1880 the county built a general hospital at the poor farm in Wauwatosa, but distance was an obstacle for many residents. In 1894 the city created an emergency hospital on Michigan Street, but it had limited capacity. Around the turn of the century community leaders began to raise funds for a full-service general public hospital, but it was controversial, opposed by Marquette University.

Finally built in 1927 and 1928, the Milwaukee County Dispensary and Emergency Hospital functioned from 1928 until June 1983. From its opening until about 1950 this hospital provided emergency and short-term health care to area residents. This facility had 500 beds and was to include facilities to house 300 student nurses and it was to have a college of hospital administration on its grounds. The student nursing housing was not built and the college was not founded. At this time no other college of hospital administration existed anywhere in the world.

In 1928 a hyperbaric chamber was constructed in the hospital basement, but it was not used until 1936. At that time Dr. Edgar End began using the chamber to experiment with artificial breathing mixtures to overcome the problems associated with deep diving. The U.S. Navy used the results of End's work in World War II. End also researched using the hyperbaric chamber to treat various medical problems and medical emergencies, such as decompression illness in divers and deep tunnel workers, treating carbon monoxide poisoning, and treating burn, stroke and gangrene patients.

The usage and importance of this hospital began to decline in the 1950s. Its services were reduced and some of its floors were occupied by social service agencies. The hyperbaric chamber eventually no longer met safety standards of the day and in 1977 it was dismantled. The County finally closed this hospital in June 1983.

The building sat empty for some time. In the meantime it was nominated to be on the National Register of Historic Places in 1985. The Milwaukee Public school district eventually took over this building and turned it first into Grand Avenue Middle School and later into the Milwaukee Academy of Chinese Language.
