= Main Hall/La Crosse State Normal School =

- U.S. National Register of Historic Places
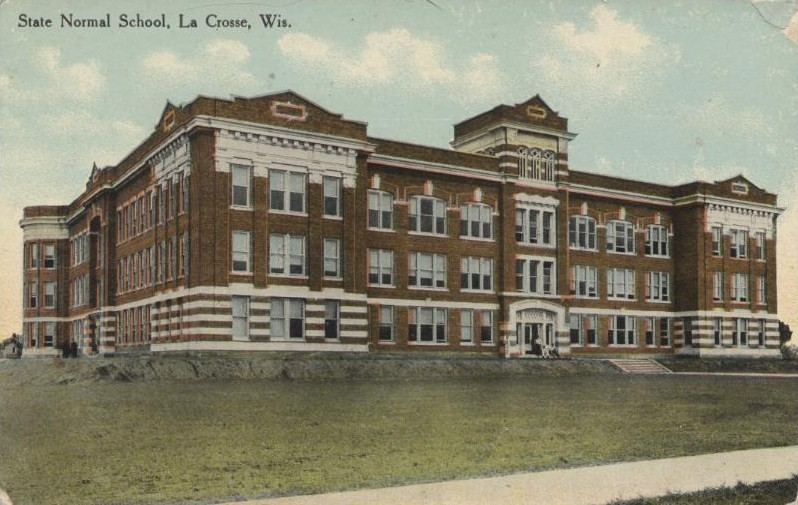
- Early postcard of the building
- Location: 1724 State St., Univ. of WI, La Crosse
- Architect: Van Ryn & Gelleke
- NRHP reference No.: 85000579
- Added to NRHP: March 14, 1985

Main Hall/La Crosse State Normal School was the original building for La Crosse Normal School now the University of Wisconsin–La Crosse in La Crosse, Wisconsin. The building was constructed in 1909. The office of the chancellor and various administrative departments are in Main Hall. The building is now known as the Maurice O. Graff Main Hall.

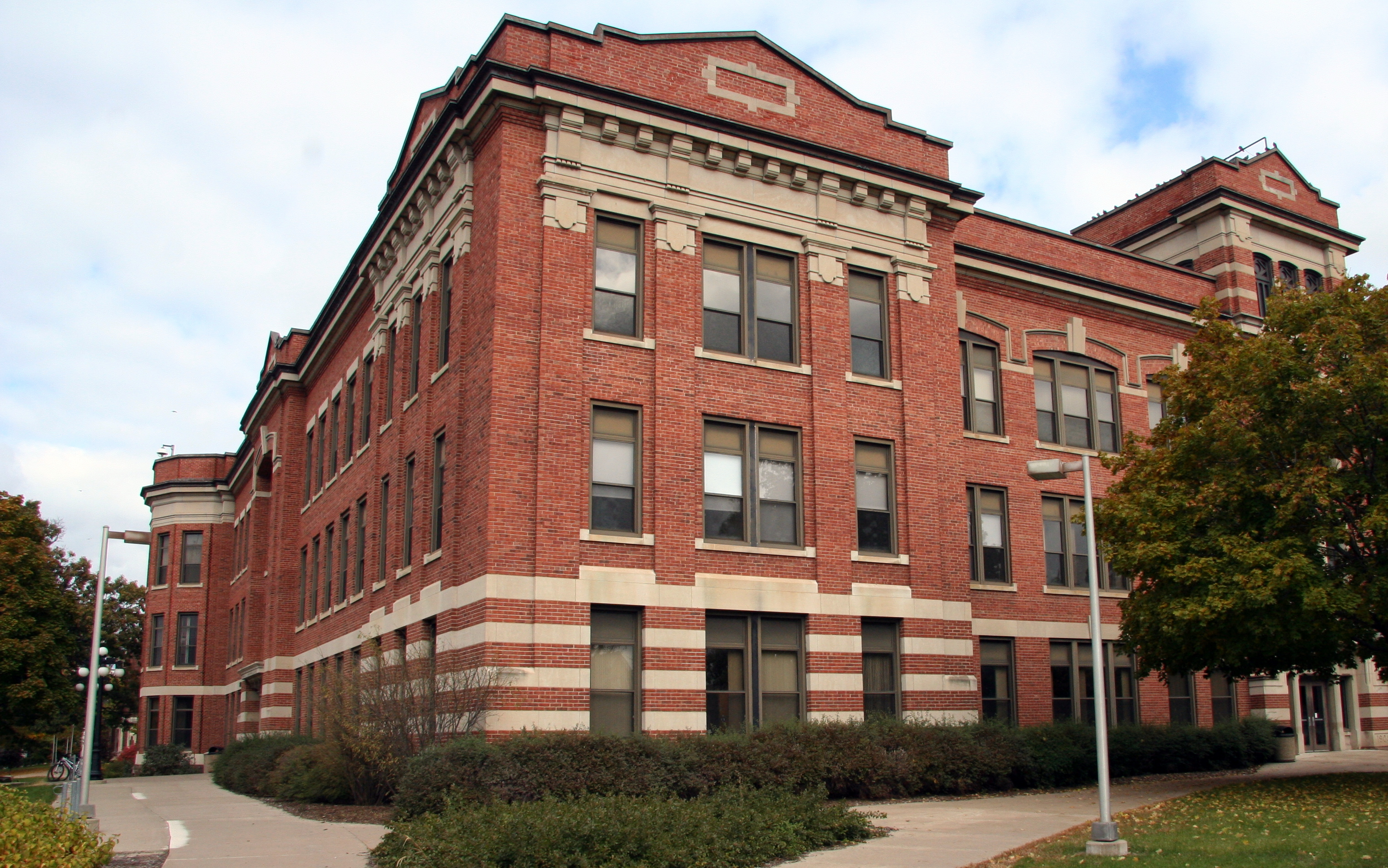
The building as it appears currently
