= Maple Park Historic District =

Historic district in Wisconsin, United States

- U.S. National Register of Historic Places
- U.S. Historic district
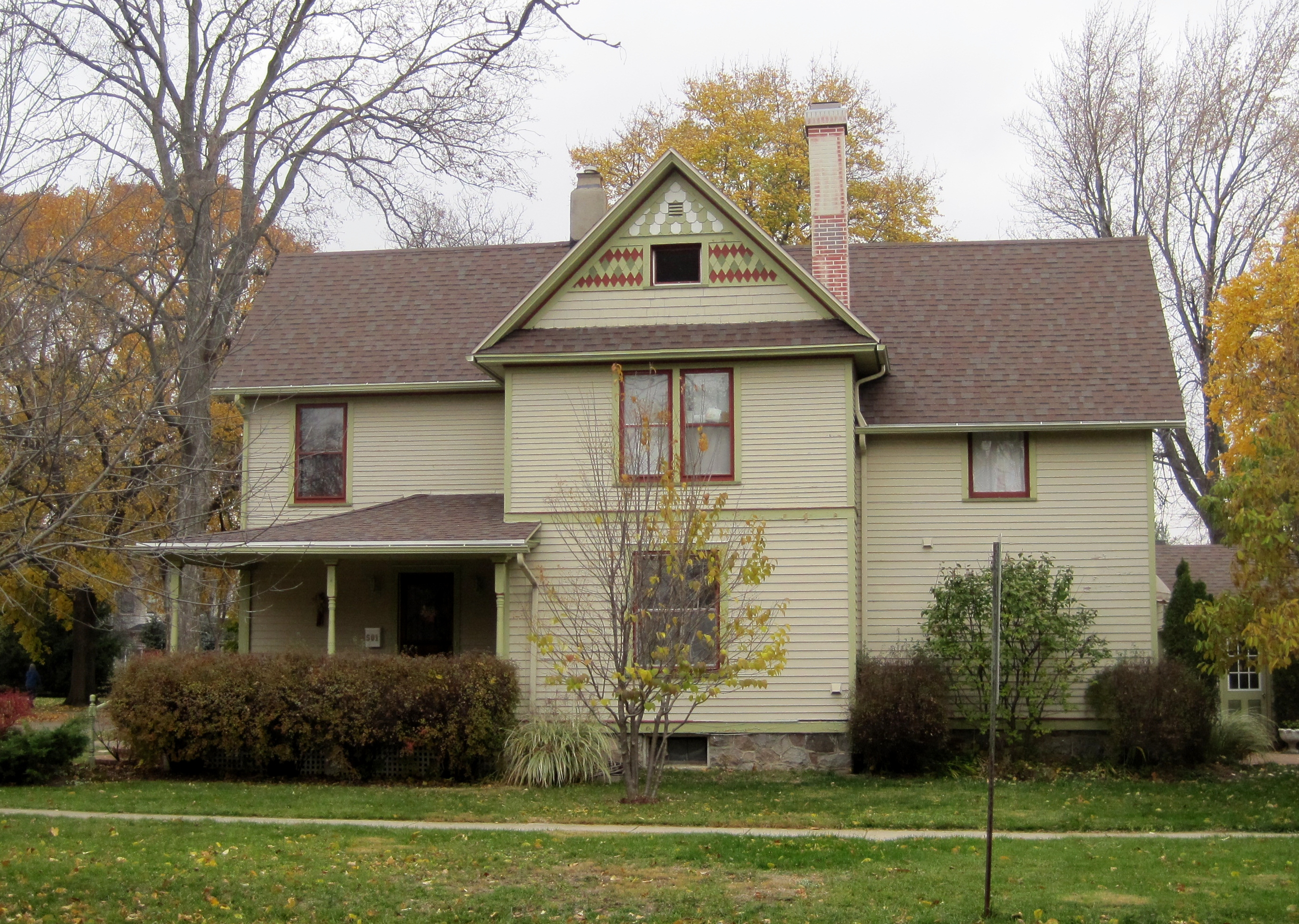
- A house in the district.
- Location: Lake Geneva, Wisconsin
- Coordinates: 42.59426°N 88.43951°W
- NRHP reference No.: 05000621
- Added to NRHP: June 17, 2005

The Maple Park Historic District is a historic neighborhood that lies northwest of the downtown of Lake Geneva, Wisconsin, United States. Part of the original city plat for Lake Geneva, it was first home to early settlers before the town became known as a retreat for wealthy Chicagoans. The district was added to the National Register of Historic Places in 2005.

== History ==
The Maple Park Historic District in Lake Geneva, Wisconsin includes parts of the original plat of the settlement in 1837. The earliest houses in the district reflect the Greek Revival and Italianate styles and were home to some of the town's earliest settlers. Following the Civil War, Lake Geneva became known as a summer retreat for wealthy citizens from hot Chicago, and during this boom stately houses were built in the Maple Park neighborhood. During the mid-nineteenth to mid-twentieth centuries, the Maple Park vicinity became home to some of the city's finest high-style houses.

The neighborhood features work from prominent local architects. Chicago firm Treat & Foltz designed the Episcopal church, completed in 1882. J. C. Llewellyn & Co. designed a Prairie School addition to the Central School in 1928. Charles O. LaSalle was contracted to build many of the Queen Anne houses in the district as well as the main Central School building. A Lustron house, built around 1950, is also found in the district. The Lake Geneva Library was designed by a student of Frank Lloyd Wright in 1954. The historic district was recognized by the National Park Service with a listing on the National Register of Historic Places on June 17, 2005.

== Select contributing properties ==
In general order built:

- Maple Park itself was reserved for a public square in Thomas McKaig's Original Plat of Lake Geneva in 1837. The town square tradition was brought west with Yankee settlers. In this case a residential neighborhood developed around the reserved square.
- Pioneer Cemetery was also reserved in McKaig's Original Plat of 1837, designated a cemetery from the start. The community's early pioneers were buried there. By 1880 all lots had been sold. In the 1830s, cemeteries were not formally landscaped, and it remains so to this day.
- The 1858 William Allen house at 332 Maxwell St still shows Greek Revival style in its low-pitched roof and the frieze board beneath the eaves of the 2-story section.
- The 1859 John Holt house at 1131 Wisconsin St is also Greek Revival style, but with cornice returns and a stucco exterior. The large bay window was added after the initial construction.
- The west ell of the house at 1134 Geneva St was built around 1855 in Greek Revival style by Roswell Burt, a retired farmer. H.A. Mead added the large main block in 1867, styled Italianate with a low-pitched hip roof, wide eaves, and segmental brick arches above the windows. In 1899 the house was bought by J.V. Seymour, the "Ice King" who harvested ice on Lake Geneva in the winter and shipped tons of it to Chicago each year.
- The ca. 1863 Farrington-Redfearn House at 1024 Geneva St is a 2-story Italianate house, frame with a low-pitched hip roof and wide bracketed eaves. S.P. Farrington bought the house in 1876, and Mrs. M.B. Cox lived there in the 1880s. In 1893 it was bought by Albert Redfearn, a railroad conductor.
- The 1867–68 James Simmons house at 234 Warren St. shows Gothic Revival style in the steep pitch of its roof and dormers, the tall windows, and the bay window. The style was reworked in the early 20th century into the Craftsman style of the time, seen in the exposed rafters of the main porch and the sun room, the knee brackets of the porch, and perhaps in the wide eaves. Simmons was a lawyer who arrived from Vermont in 1843. He served in public offices, published legal books, wrote a history of Lake Geneva in 1875, and published an early local newspaper.
- The Nethercut house at 504 Cook St was built in 1868, a 2-story Italianate house with cream brick walls, wide bracketed eaves, and a low-pitched hip roof. The rear ell is said to have been added around 1900 and the sun porch in 1921. George Nethercut was an Irish immigrant shoemaker who came to Lake Geneva in 1855 with his wife Mary.
- The 1872 William Davis house at 1103 Geneva St is another 2-story Italianate house with hip roof and wide bracketed eaves. This one is frame, with a gable on the south side, decorated with cornice returns and an arched hood molding.
- The 1877 Frank Stewart house at 831 Dodge St is a 2-story Italianate frame house like many before, but large. The front porch's tapered posts are from the Craftsman style of the early 20th century.
- The 1877 United Methodist Church at 912 Geneva St is a cream brick church with a square corner tower. The walls are flanked with buttresses and pierced with Gothic-arched openings.
- The 1880–82 Episcopal Church of the Holy Communion at 320 Broad St is another Gothic Revival-styled building, with steep roofs and walls of fieldstone with limestone trim. In the end above the main entrance is a large rose window. The stained glass in that window and the other windows was designed by Henry Lord Gay.
- The 1882 Salisbury house at 323 Cook St is a 2.5-story frame house with steeply pitched roofs, tall, narrow windows, and delicate details characteristic of High Victorian Gothic style. The house is paired with a matching carriage house.
- The 1883 Hitchcock-Fiske house at 920 Geneva St is a 2-story frame house in an early Queen Anne style, large and rambling, with bay windows, complex roofs, wood shingles in the gables, and bargeboards. The house was built by John Braga for Mrs. D. Hitchcock, probably the widow of a physician, and the newspaper of the day reported it being built in a "modern style." The Fiskes bought it in 1886 and added the living room and parlor with 11-foot ceilings for good acoustics, since Mrs. Fiske taught piano. Mr. S.J. Fiske wrote about American history and they added a study at the rear of the house for his work.
- The 1887 Hugh Reed house at 834 Dodge St is another Queen Anne-style house, but a cross-gable form with a 2.5-story square tower on the corner. It has the wood shingles in the gable ends typical of Queen Anne.
- The 1887 Charles French house at 1004 Geneva St is another large 2-story frame Queen Anne, with a 2-story porch on the east side. French was an attorney who served as mayor and postmaster and founded the city's electric light service.
- The 1890 Buckbee house at 1003 Main St is a 2.5-story "mansion" with a late Second Empire style, with the mansard roof that is the hallmark of that style. In the center is a low domed tower and a one-story porch runs across the front. Francis A. Buckbee was a merchant who married A.J. Palmer, the daughter of a doctor, and became Justice of the Peace and judge.
- The 1893 LaSalle house at 543 Madison St is another 2-story frame Queen Anne, with flared eaves and modillions, with 2-story bay windows, and with a wrap-around porch. Charles O. LaSalle was an important homebuilder in Lake Geneva and he built this house for himself.
- The 1901–02 Frank Durkee house at 1033 Wisconsin St is a 2-story brick house with a hip roof, Georgian Revival-styled with white trim against red brick, modillions and frieze under the eaves, and a Classic Revival-styled front porch supported by columns with Ionic capitals.
- The 1902 Frank Johnson house at 832 Geneva St is a 2-story Queen Anne with walls of cream brick with 2-story bays. Johnson ran a high-end grocery store in town.
- The 1904 Central School at 900 Wisconsin St was designed by Van Ryn & DeGelleke of Milwaukee with a Classic Revival influence, with large hip roofs extending to wide eaves decorated with modillions. Beneath are red brick walls. First-story windows are decorated with keystones. Connected is the 1928 High School, with red brick walls like the 1904 building but trimmed with white horizontal bands and geometric designs from Prairie School.
- The 1909 W.H. McDonald house at 933 Main St is a 2.5-story in Tudor Revival style, typified by the facade of half-timbering and stucco above the first story. The first story is clad in red brick. A massive chimney rises from the center of the house. The house was reportedly designed by Daniel Burnham's firm. Dr. McDonald had his office in the house.
- The 1912 Craftsman Horticultural Hall at 330 Broad St.
- The ca 1950 Lustron House at 308 Maxwell St is a modest ranch-like house prefabricated and mass-produced to provide affordable housing after WWII. The exterior walls are of porcelain-enameled panels. Inside are built-in cabinets and shelving and a radiant heating system. This particular Lustron house is well-preserved.
- The 1954 Lake Geneva Library at 918 Main St is a long, low red brick building in a park-like setting along the lakefront. It was designed by James Dresser, a student of Frank Lloyd Wright, and Wright's influence is apparent in the design.
