= Hudson Public Library =

- U.S. National Register of Historic Places
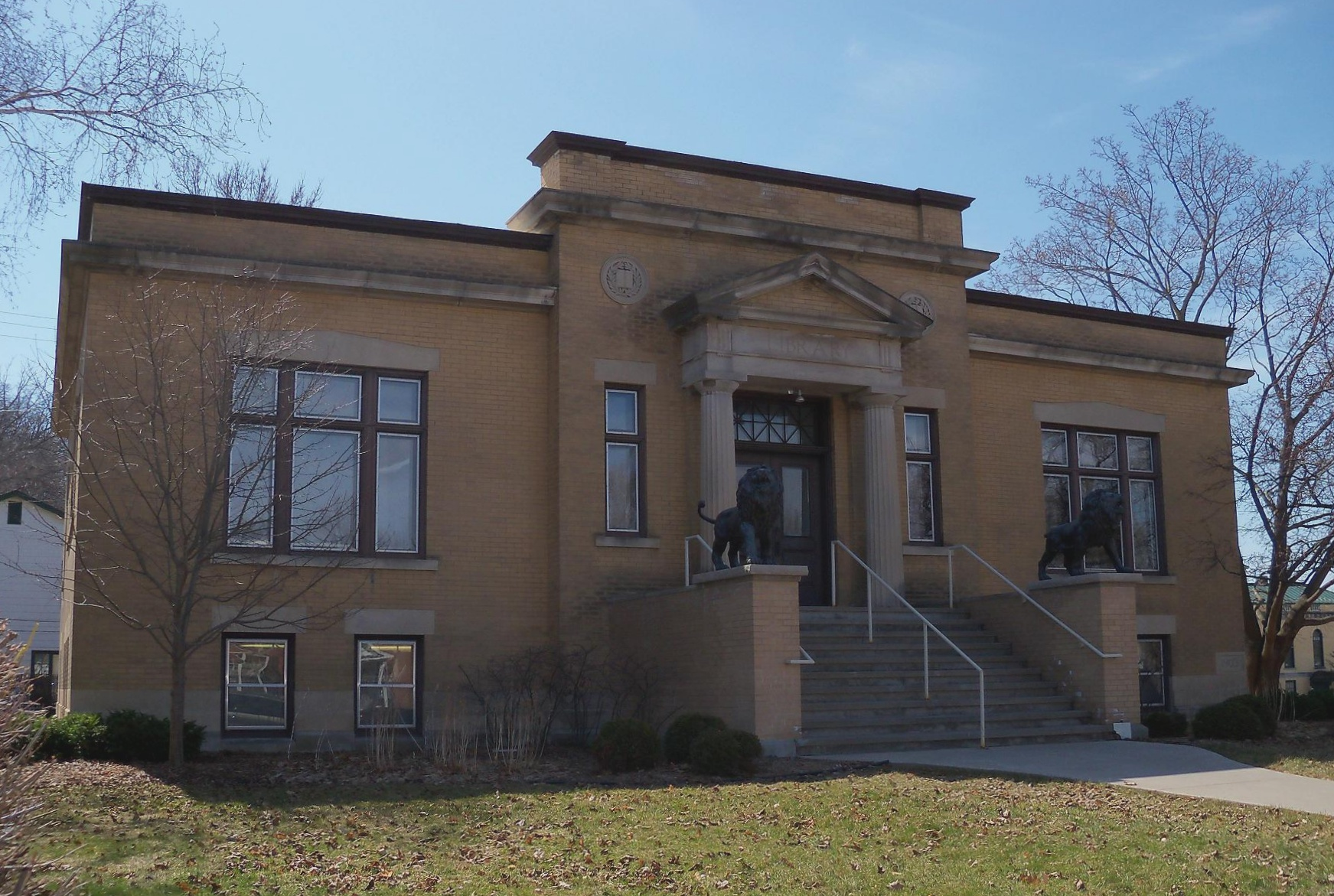
- Hudson Public Library
- Location: 304 Locust St., Hudson, Wisconsin
- Coordinates: 44°58′33″N 92°45′19″W
- Area: less than one acre
- Built: 1904
- Architect: Van Ryn & DeGelleke/Peter Kircher
- Architectural style: Neoclassical
- MPS: Hudson and North Hudson MRA
- NRHP reference No.: 84000062
- Added to NRHP: October 4, 1984

The Hudson Public Library is located in Hudson, Wisconsin.

== History ==
A Carnegie library, it was formally established in 1903, though the building was not constructed until the following year. It was listed on the National Register of Historic Places in 1984 and on the State Register of Historic Places in 1989.

== See also ==
- List of Carnegie libraries in Wisconsin
