= Ullrich Hall =

- Agriculture and Manual Arts Building/Platteville State Normal School
- U.S. National Register of Historic Places
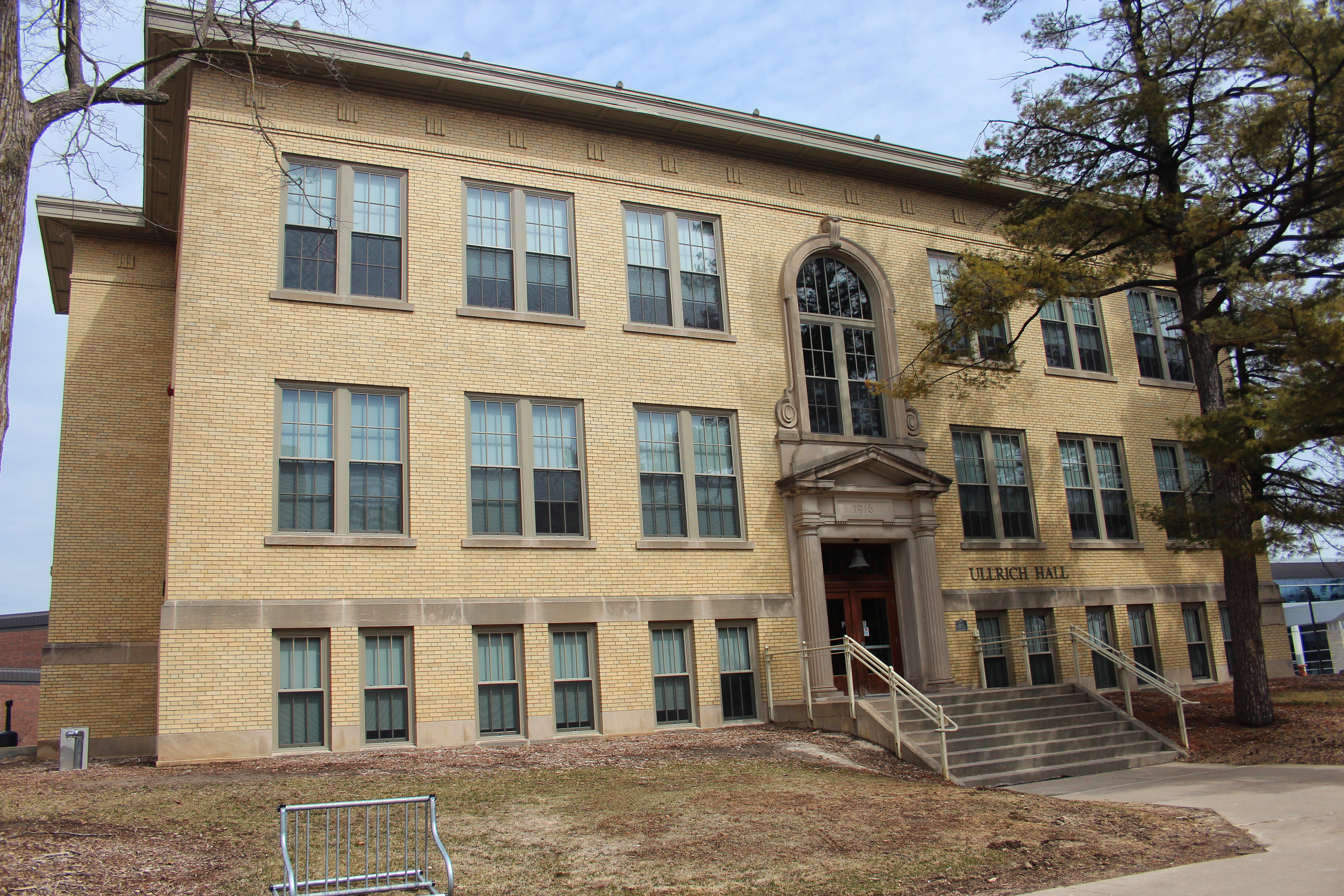
- Agriculture and Manual Arts Building/Platteville State Normal School
- Location: 690 W. Pine St., Platteville, Wisconsin
- Coordinates: 42°44′03″N 90°29′10″W
- Area: less than one acre
- Built: 1916
- Architect: Van Ryn & DeGelleke
- Architectural style: Neoclassical
- NRHP reference No.: 85000578
- Added to NRHP: March 14, 1985

Ullrich Hall is a historic building on the campus of University of Wisconsin-Platteville in Platteville, Wisconsin.

== History ==
The building was originally built in 1916 as the Agriculture and Manual Arts Building as part of the Platteville State Normal School. The hall contained a forge room, a farm carpentry room, a dairy lab, a stock judging room, a gym, etc. The specialized training it allowed was a milestone in the state normal school system. Now known as Ullrich Hall, it is the oldest remaining academic building of what is now the University of Wisconsin-Platteville.

It was listed on the National Register of Historic Places in 1985 and on the State Register of Historic Places in 1989.
