= Charles W. Stribley House =

Historic house in Wisconsin, United States

- U.S. National Register of Historic Places
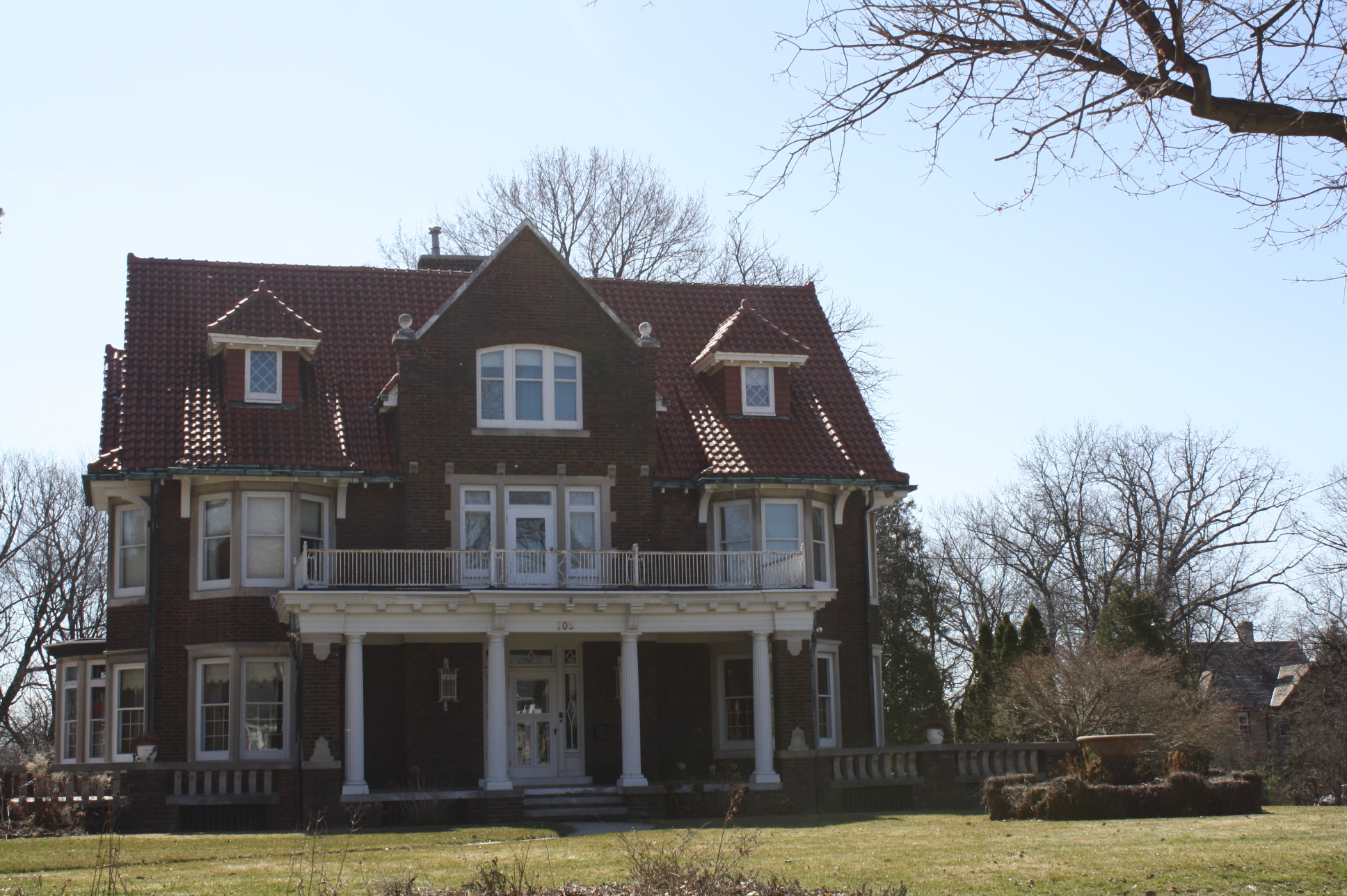
- Charles W. Stribley House

- Location within Wisconsin Location within the United States
- Location: 705 W. Wisconsin Ave. Kaukauna, Wisconsin
- Coordinates: 44°17′4″N 88°16′37″W
- Area: 2 acres (0.81 ha)
- Built: 1910
- Architect: Van Ryn & DeGelleke
- Architectural style: Romanesque, Bungalow/craftsman
- MPS: Kaukauna MRA
- NRHP reference No.: 84003770
- Added to NRHP: March 29, 1984

The Charles W. Stribley House is located in Kaukauna, Wisconsin, United States. It was built in 1910. It was a work of architects Van Ryn & DeGelleke. It was added to the National Register of Historic Places for its architectural significance in 1984.

The 1945-built Casa Rio, in Florida, also known as the S.W. Stribley House, is another work by Van Ryn & DeGelleke, and is their only NRHP-listed work outside of Wisconsin.
