= Van Ryn & DeGelleke =

Former American architectural firm

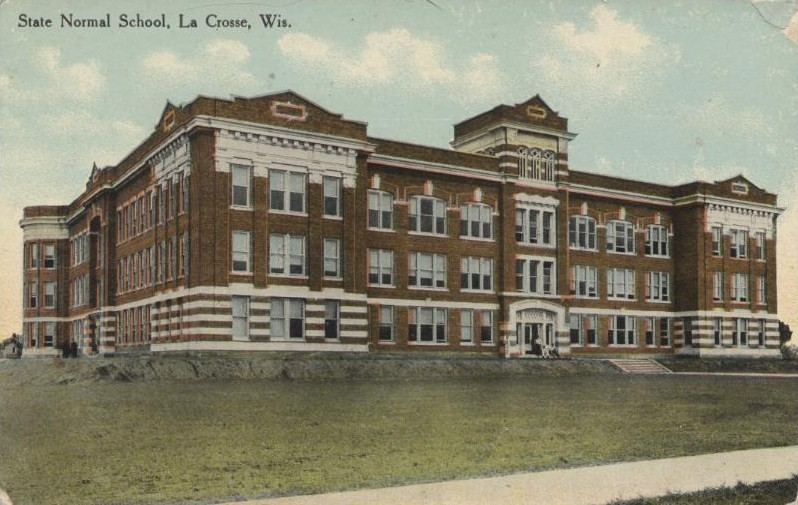
Main Hall/La Crosse State Normal School

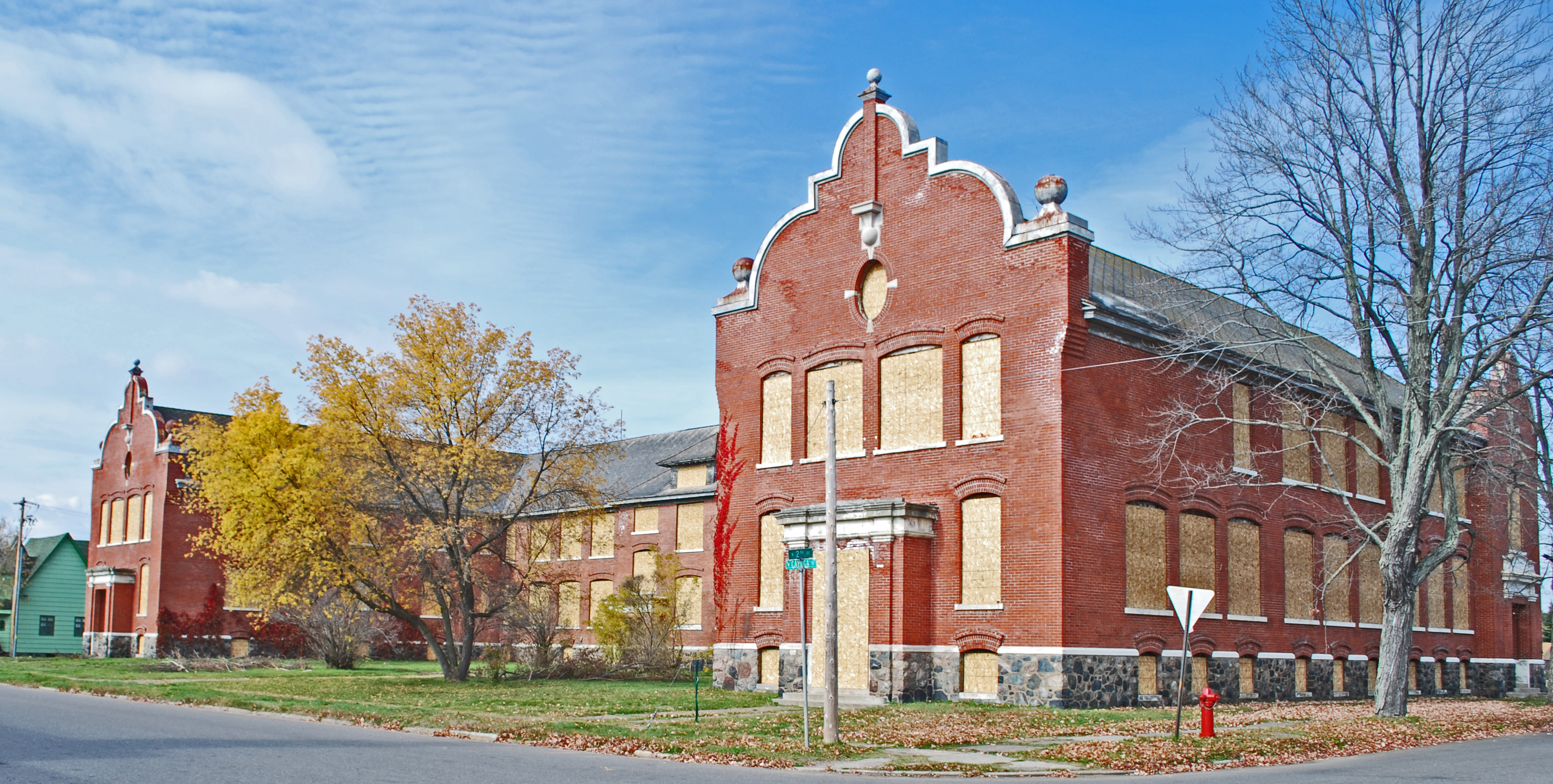
Central School

Van Ryn & DeGelleke was an architectural firm in Wisconsin. It was a partnership of Henry J. Van Ryn (born 1864) and Gerrit Jacob DeGelleke (August 19, 1872 - February 22, 1960), both of whom grew up in Milwaukee.

A number of its works are listed on the U.S. National Register of Historic Places.

Works include:

- Agriculture and Manual Arts Building/Platteville State Normal School, Univ. of Wisconsin, Platteville, Platteville, Wisconsin (Van Ryn & De Gelleke), NRHP-listed
- Boscobel High School, 207 Buchanan St., Boscobel, Wisconsin (Van Ryn & de Gelleke), NRHP-listed
- Casa Rio, built 1945, at 2424 McGregor Blvd., Fort Myers, Florida (Van Ryn, Henry; de Gelleke, Gerrit), NRHP-listed
- One or more works in Central Park Historic District, roughly bounded by 19th St., Adams St., 16th St. and Jefferson St., Two Rivers, Wisconsin (Van Ryn & de Gelleke), NRHP-listed
- Central School, 218 West Cayuga St, Iron River, Michigan (Van Ryn & DeGelleke), NRHP-listed
- F. A. Chadbourn House, 314 S. Charles St., Columbus, Wisconsin (Van Ryn & DeGelleke), NRHP-listed
- Grand Avenue Elementary School, 2708 W. Wisconsin Ave., Milwaukee, (VanRyn & DeGelleke), NRHP-listed, 1921
- Hudson Public Library, 304 Locust St., Hudson, Wisconsin (VanRyn & DeGelleke), NRHP-listed
- Janesville High School, 408 S. Main St., Janesville, Wisconsin (Van Ryn & De Gellke), NRHP-listed
- Lee Ovitt house, 245 N. Hartwell, Waukesha, Wisconsin. 1901.
- Lincoln County Courthouse, 1110 E. Main St., Merrill, Wisconsin (Van Ryn & De Gelleke), NRHP-listed
- Main Hall/La Crosse State Normal School, 1724 State St., Univ. of Wisconsin, La Crosse, La Crosse, Wisconsin (Van Ryn & Gelleke), NRHP-listed
- One or more works in Maple Park Historic District, generally bounded by North, Cook, Main and Maxwell Sts., Lake Geneva, Wisconsin (Van Ryn and de Gelleke), NRHP-listed
- Marshfield City Hall, 110 E 2nd St, Marshfield, Wisconsin, 1901, (Van Ryn and De Gelleke), contributes to Marshfield Central Avenue Historic District
- Milwaukee County Dispensary and Emergency Hospital, 2430 W. Wisconsin Ave., Milwaukee, Wisconsin (Van Ryn & DeGelleke), NRHP-listed
- Nelson Hall, 1209 Fremont St., Stevens Point, Wisconsin (Van Ryn, Henry J.; de Gelleke, Gerrit), NRHP-listed
- One or more works in Oshkosh State Normal School Historic District, buildings at 800, 842, and 912 Algoma Blvd., and 845 Elmwood Ave., Oshkosh, Wisconsin (Van Ryn & DeGelleke), NRHP-listed
- Schofield Hall, 105 Garfield Ave., Eau Claire, Wisconsin (Van Ryn & DeGelleke), NRHP-listed
- West Bend City Hall, 100 N 6th Ave, West Bend, Wisconsin, 1901 (Van Ryn & Degelleke), contributes to West Bend Downtown Historic District
- West Bend Mutual Fire Insurance Company, 519 Hickory St, West Bend, Wisconsin, 1908 (Van Ryn & Degelleke), contributes to West Bend Downtown Historic District
- Charles W. Stribley House, 705 W. Wisconsin Ave., Kaukauna, Wisconsin (Van Ryn & DeGelleke), NRHP-listed
- Cyrus C. Yawkey House, 403 McIndoe St., Wausau, Wisconsin (Van Ryn & Degelleke), NRHP-listed
- Connor Lumber and Land Company Store, 4894 Mill St., Laona, Wisconsin (Van Ryn & Degelleke), NRHP-listed
