= Central Park Historic District (Two Rivers, Wisconsin) =

Historic district in Wisconsin, United States

- U.S. National Register of Historic Places
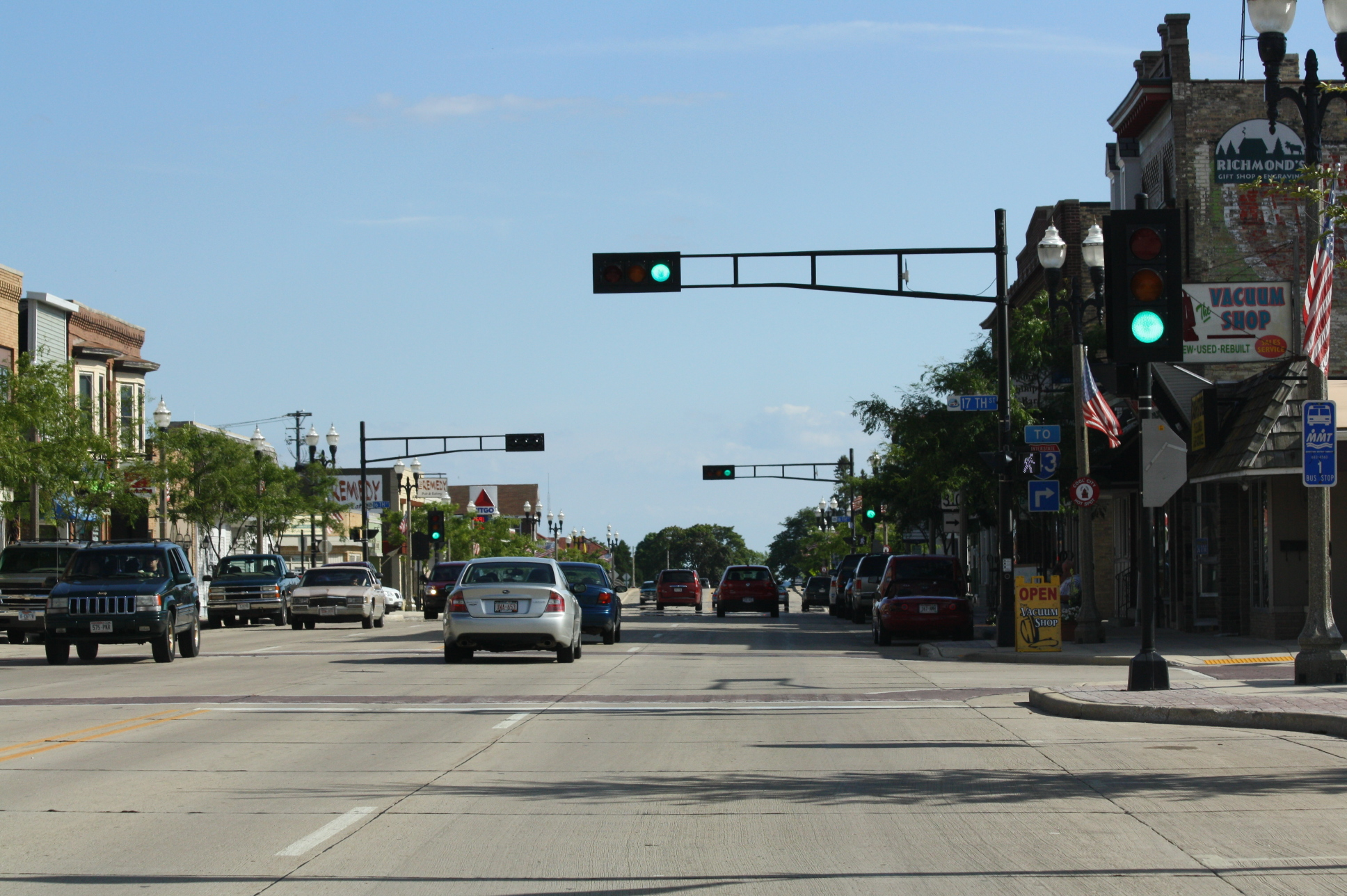
- A portion of the district.
- Location: Roughly bounded by 19th St., Adams St., 16th St. and Jefferson St., Two Rivers, Wisconsin
- Area: 10 acres (4.0 ha)
- NRHP reference No.: 00001069
- Added to NRHP: December 1, 2000

The Central Park Historic District is located in Two Rivers, Wisconsin.

== History ==
The district is old business district of Two Rivers, with notable buildings including the Greek Revival/Italianate Washington House Hotel built 1850/1870/1904, the 1880 Italianate Richter block, the 1889 Gothic Revival St. John's Lutheran Church, the 1899 Classical Revival Schroeder Block, the 1900 Civil War Soldiers' Monument, the 1905 Romanesque Revival Hamilton School, the 1906 Neoclassical Napieczinski saloon, the 1907 Queen Anne Stephany block, the 1925/37 Art Deco Beduhn/Goetz Furniture Store/funeral parlor, and the 1931 Tudor Revival Hamilton Community House. It includes works by Christ H. Tegen and Van Ryn & DeGelleke.

In 2000, it was added to the State and the National Register of Historic Places.
