= Kilbourn Public Library =

- U.S. National Register of Historic Places
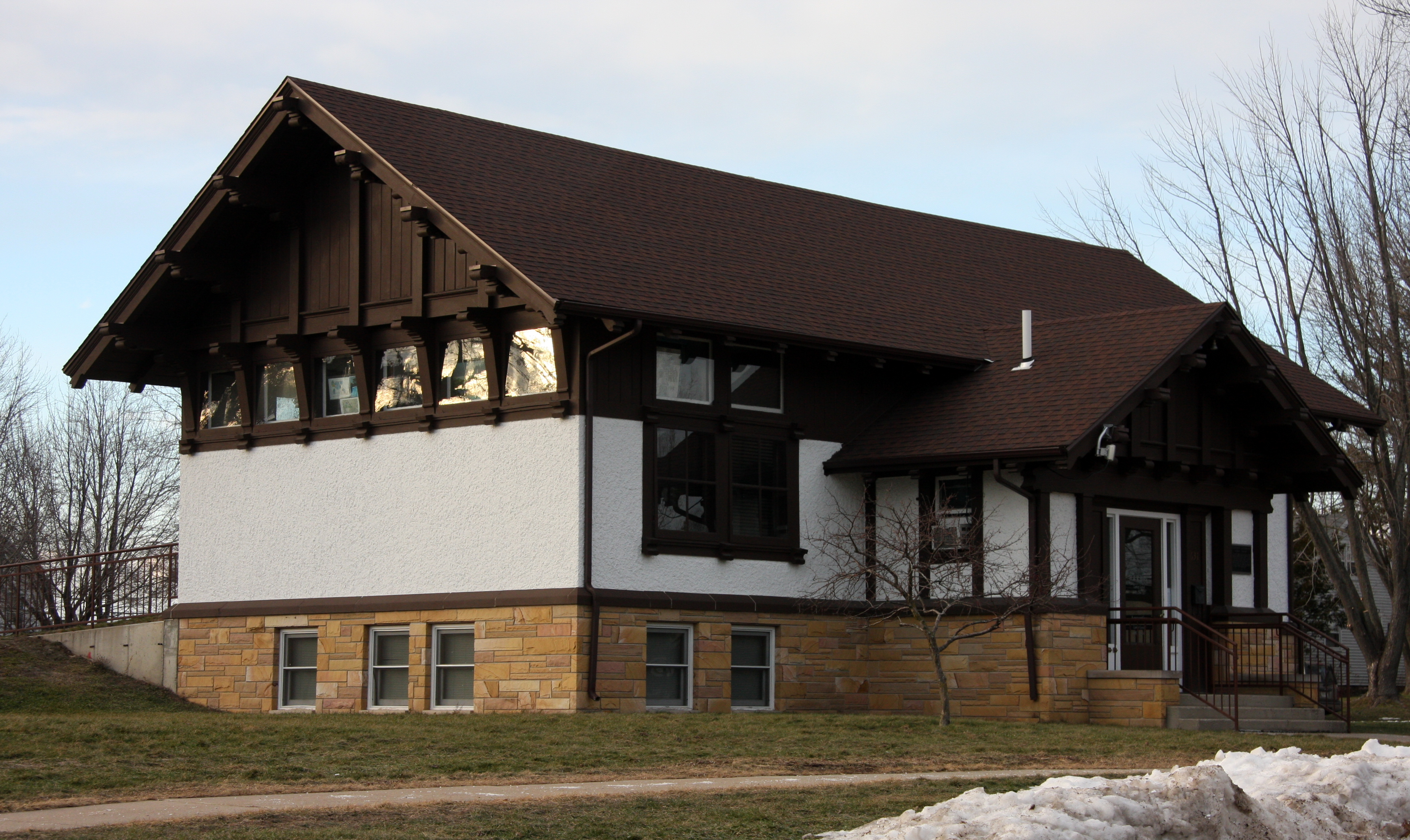

- Location within Wisconsin Location within the United States
- Location: 429 Broadway, Wisconsin Dells, Wisconsin
- Coordinates: 43°37′41″N 89°46′15″W
- Area: less than one acre
- Built: 1912
- Architect: Claude & Stavck
- Architectural style: Prairie School
- NRHP reference No.: 74000061
- Added to NRHP: December 27, 1974

Kilbourn Public Library is a Carnegie library in Wisconsin Dells, Wisconsin United States. The library was built in 1912 and designed by Claude & Starck, an architectural firm from Madison known for its library plans. The library is designed in the Prairie School style with elements of Arts and Crafts movement architecture. The city of Wisconsin Dells eventually abandoned the library for a new building. In 1999, the old library building was moved next to the new building, where it is now used for offices. The library was added to the National Register of Historic Places on December 27, 1974.
