= Black River Falls Public Library =

Library in Black River Falls, Wisconsin

- U.S. National Register of Historic Places
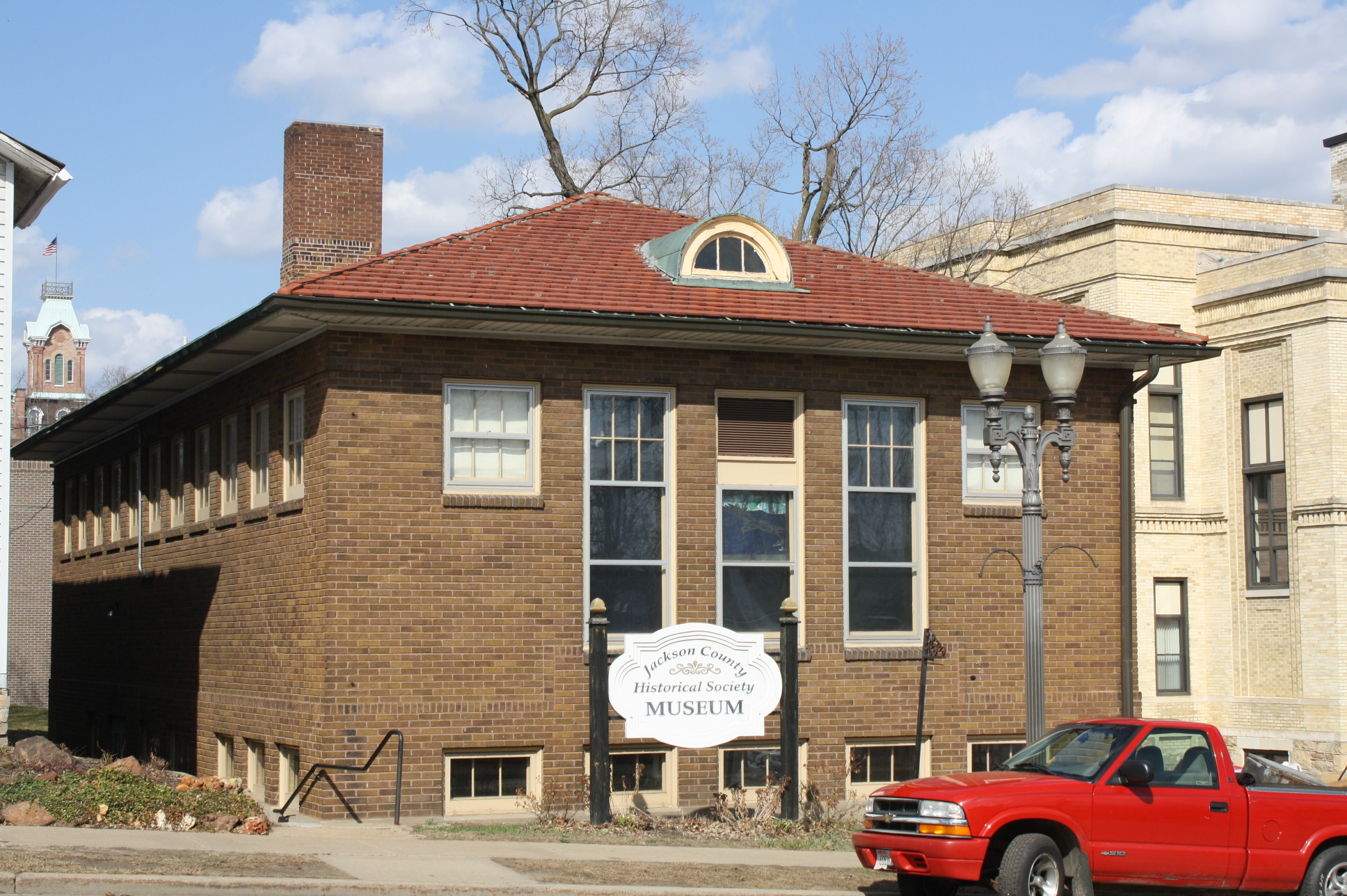

- Location within Wisconsin Location within the United States
- Interactive map showing the location for Black River Falls Public Library
- Location: 321 Main St. Black River Falls, Wisconsin
- Coordinates: 44.29521°N 90.85165°W
- Built: 1915
- Architectural style: Prairie School
- NRHP reference No.: 07001330
- Added to NRHP: December 27, 2007

The Black River Falls Public Library is located in Black River Falls, Wisconsin. It became the first free public library in Wisconsin in 1872. It was added to the National Register of Historic Places in 2007.

== History ==
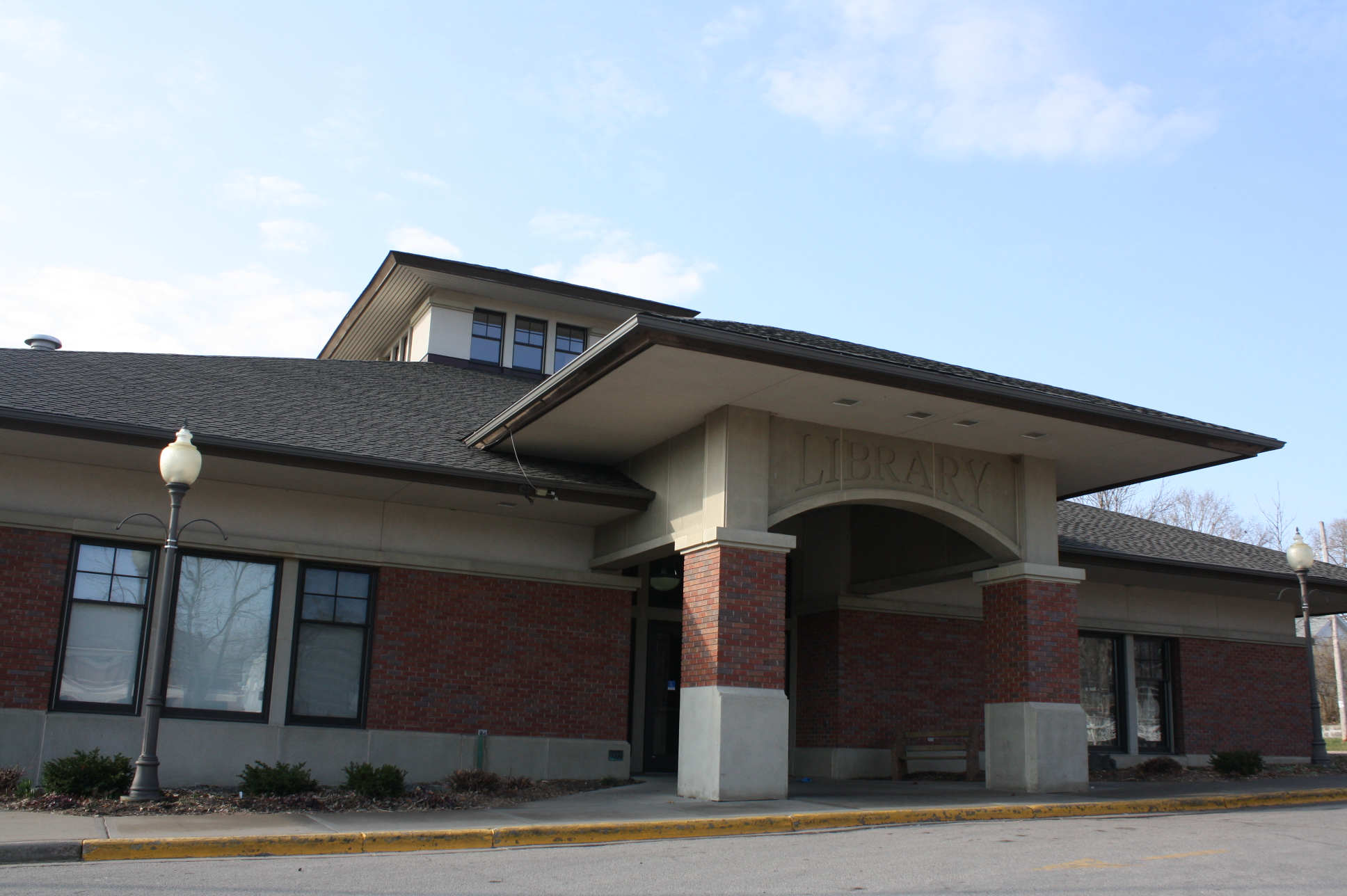
1995 library

The building served as the city's library from 1915 until a new one was constructed in 1995. It was a Carnegie library. The site now houses the Jackson County Historical Society Museum.
