= Sparta Free Library =

- U.S. National Register of Historic Places
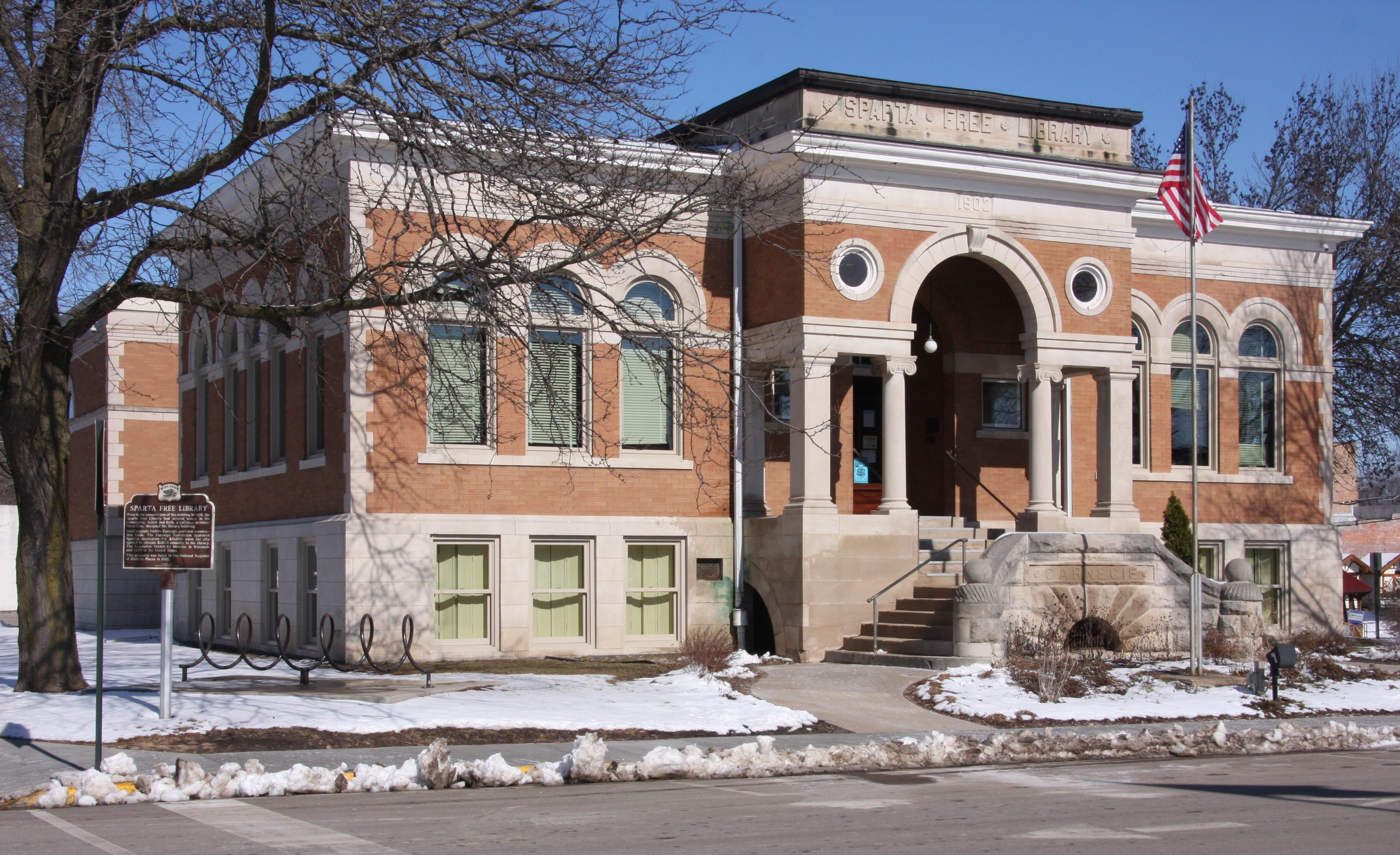
- Sparta Free Library
- Location: 124 West Main St. Sparta, Wisconsin
- Coordinates: 43.94463°N 90.81203°W
- Built: 1902
- Architect: Schick & Roth
- Architectural style: Classical Revival
- NRHP reference No.: 81000051
- Added to NRHP: September 3, 1981

The Sparta Free Library is located in Sparta, Wisconsin. It was added to the National Register of Historic Places in 1981.

== History ==
Prior to the construction of this building, the Sparta Free Library was housed in multiple buildings. The funds to build the structure were provided by Andrew Carnegie.
