= Kellogg Public Library and Neville Public Museum =

- U.S. National Register of Historic Places
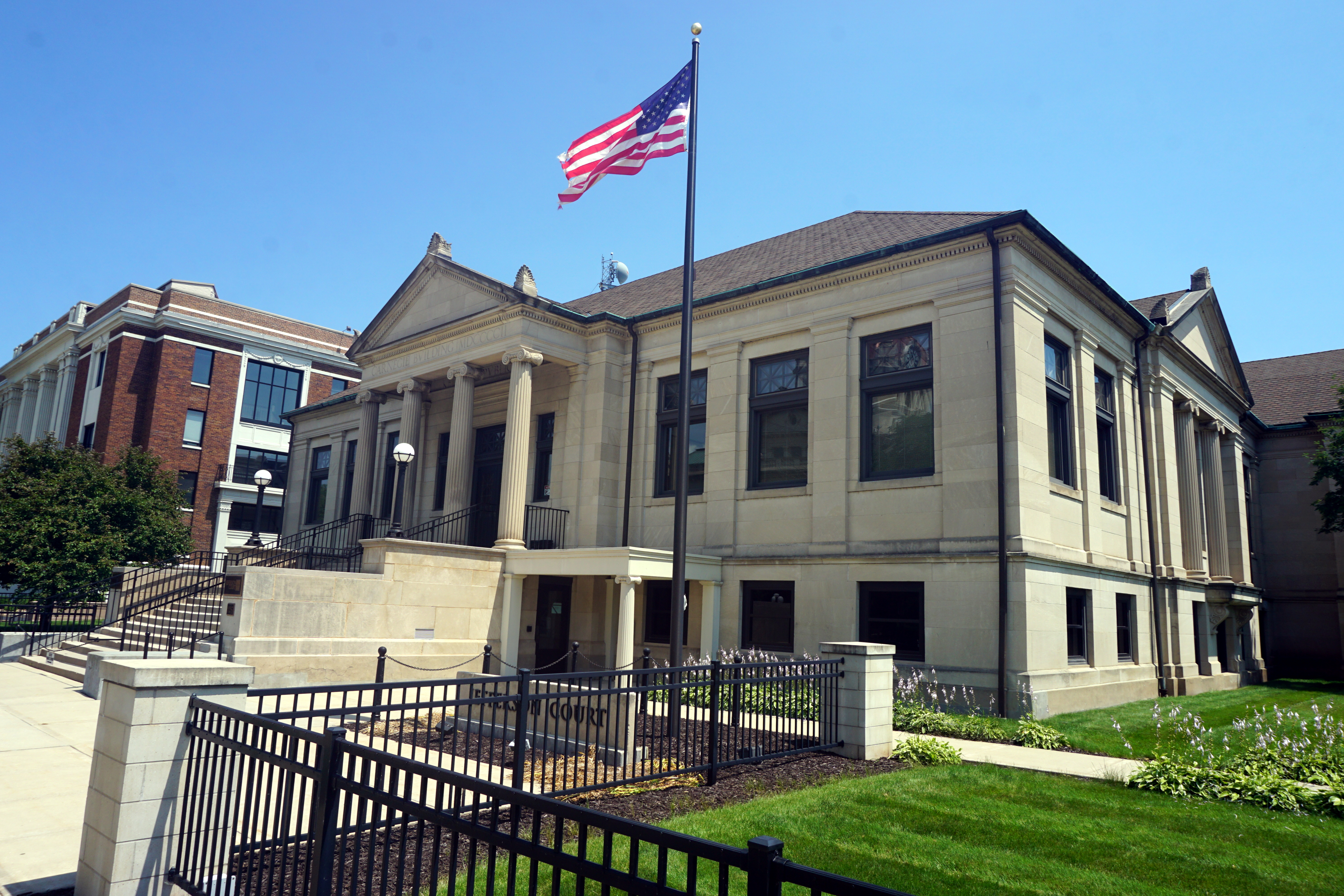
- Kellogg Public Library

- Location within Wisconsin Location within the United States
- Location: 125 S. Jefferson St., Green Bay, Wisconsin
- Coordinates: 44°30′44″N 88°0′49″W
- Area: 0.6 acres (0.24 ha)
- Built: 1903
- Architect: Foeller, Henry A.; Stephenson, Marvin F.
- Architectural style: Classical Revival
- NRHP reference No.: 81000035
- Added to NRHP: June 9, 1981

Kellogg Public Library and Neville Public Museum is located in Green Bay, Wisconsin. The site was added to the National Register of Historic Places on June 9, 1981, for its significance in architecture and social history. It was built in 1901 in the Classical Revival architectural style. In 1983, the County took full control of the museum and moved it across the river to its current location.

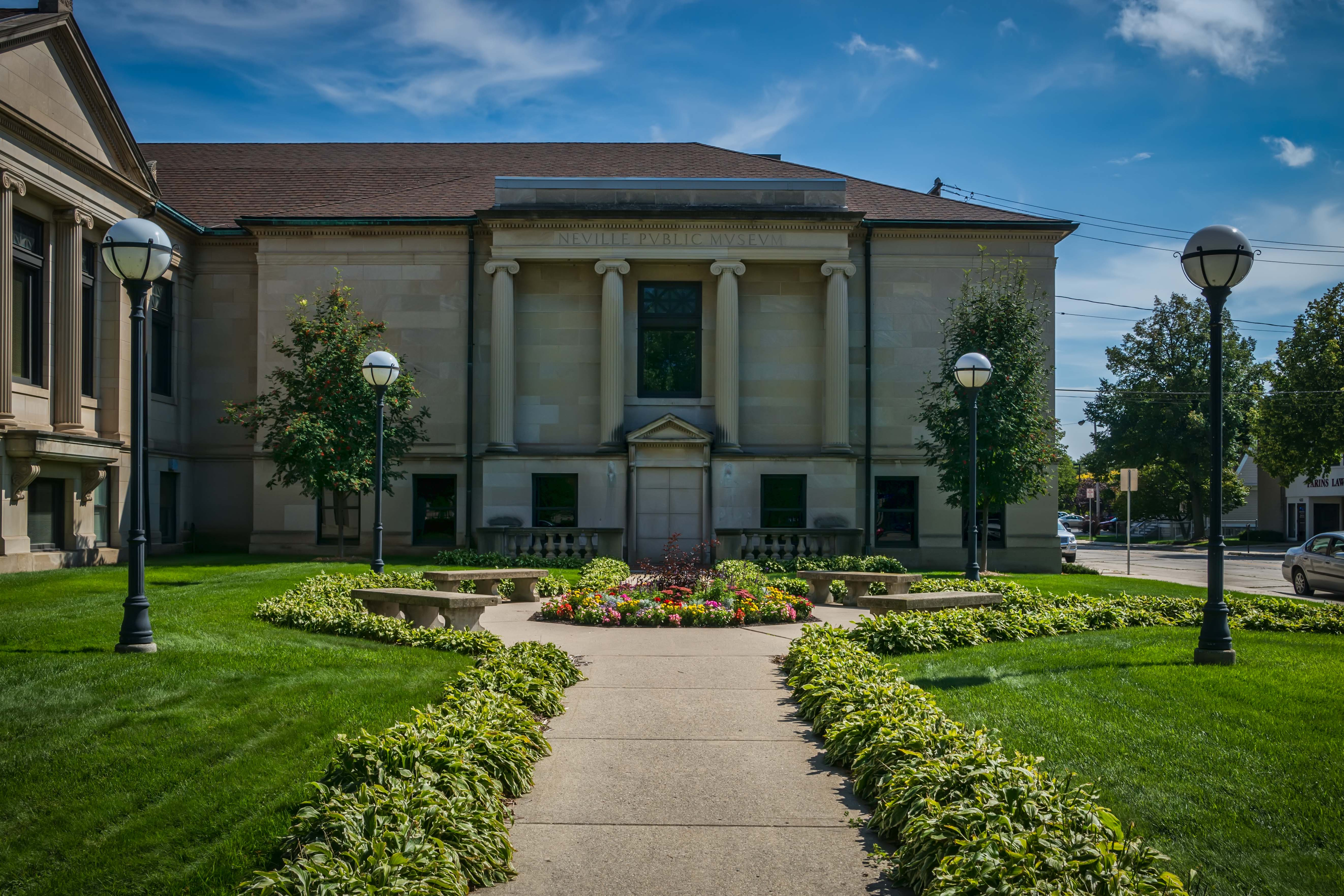
Neville Public Museum, 125 S. Jefferson St. Green Bay
