= Rice Lake Carnegie Library =

- Formerly listed on the U.S. National Register of Historic Places
- Location within Wisconsin Location within the United States
- Location: 16 S. Main St., Rice Lake, Wisconsin
- Coordinates: 45°30′4″N 91°44′2″W
- Area: 1 acre (0.40 ha)
- Built: 1905
- Architect: Parkinson and Dockendorff
- Architectural style: Late 19th And 20th Century Revivals
- NRHP reference No.: 80000434

Significant dates
- Added to NRHP: June 20, 1980
- Removed from NRHP: March 20, 1986

The Rice Lake Carnegie Library was a Carnegie library in Rice Lake, Wisconsin. It was built in 1905, replacing a library based in the city's high school, and was one of 63 Carnegie libraries in Wisconsin. The city left the building for a new library in 1978, and the building was demolished on June 26, 1985.

The library was added to the National Register of Historic Places on June 20, 1980. It was removed from the National Register on March 20, 1986, following its demolition.
