= La Crosse Armory =

- U.S. National Register of Historic Places
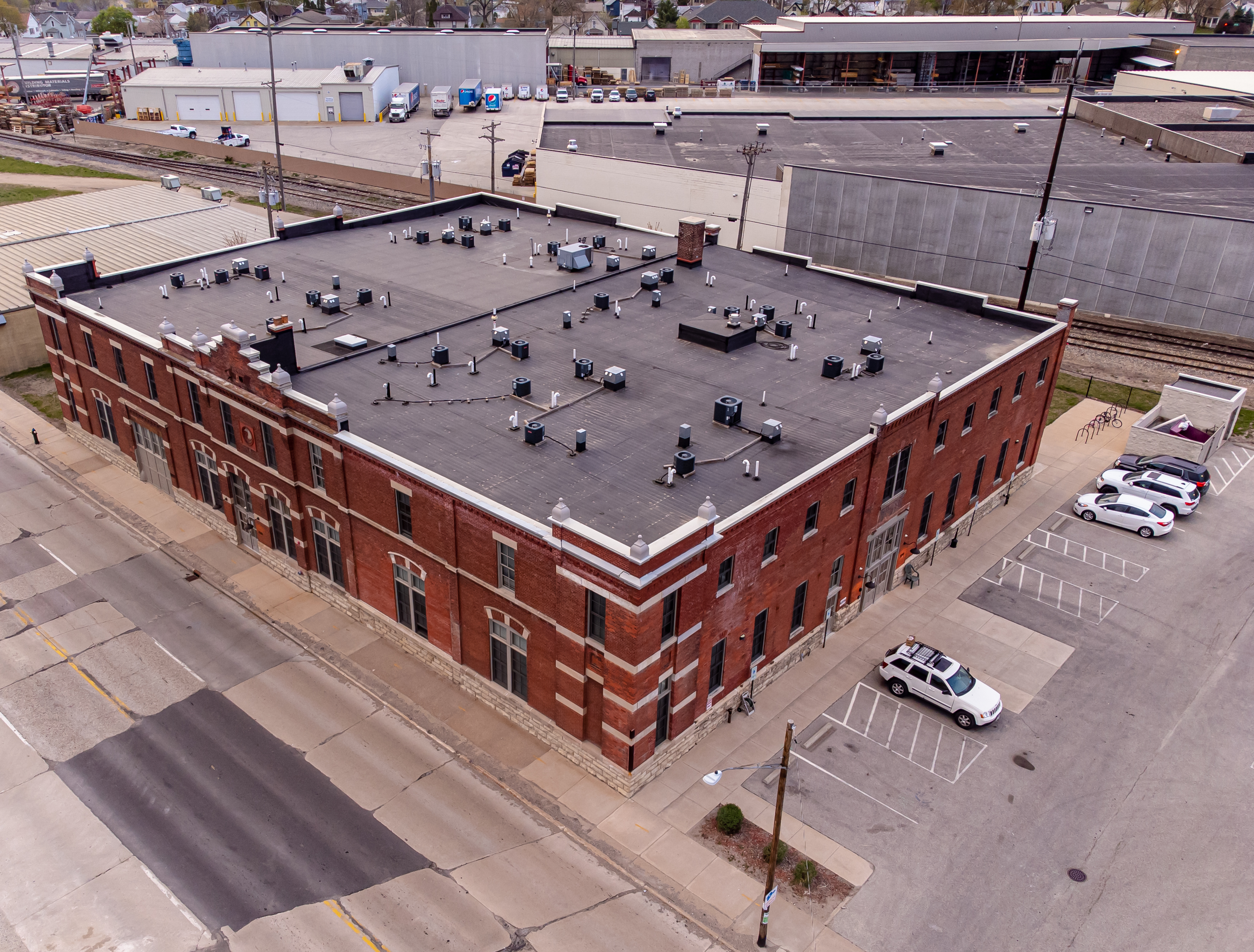

- Location within Wisconsin
- Location: 2219 South Avenue; La Crosse, Wisconsin
- Coordinates: 43°47′32″N 91°14′30″W
- Area: 1.148 acres (0.465 ha)
- Built: 1902
- Architect: C. F. Struck
- Architectural style: Late Victorian: Romanesque
- NRHP reference No.: 16000206
- Added to NRHP: April 22, 2016

The La Crosse Armory building is an armory building located in La Crosse, Wisconsin. It was used as a Wisconsin Army National Guard center after World War I starting in 1921. In 1960 the drilling location was moved to Onalaska, Wisconsin.

== Gallery ==
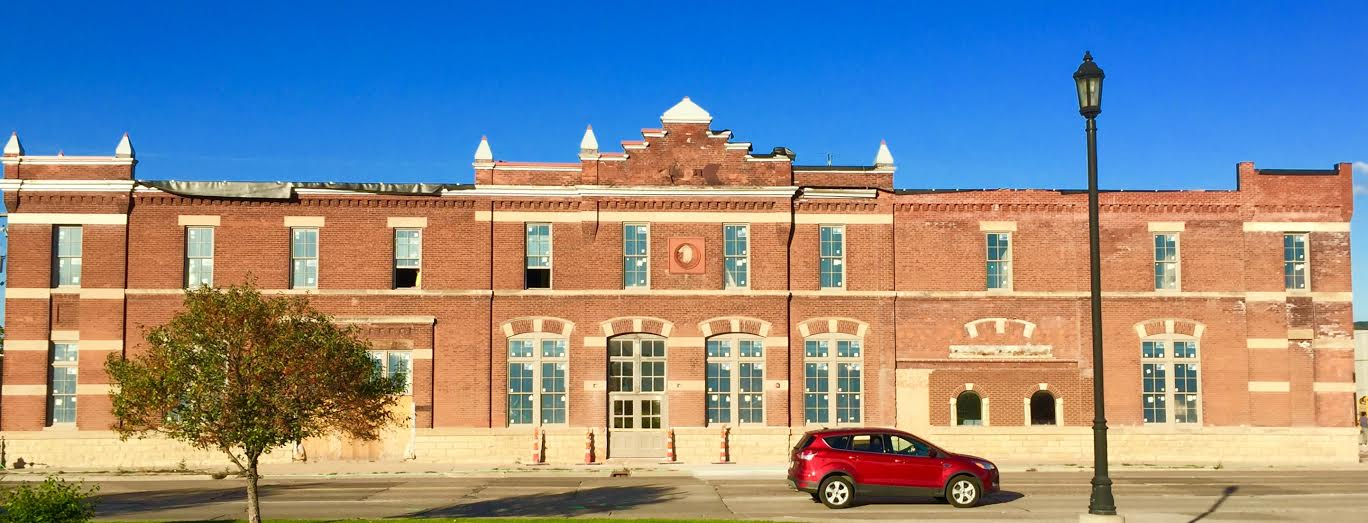

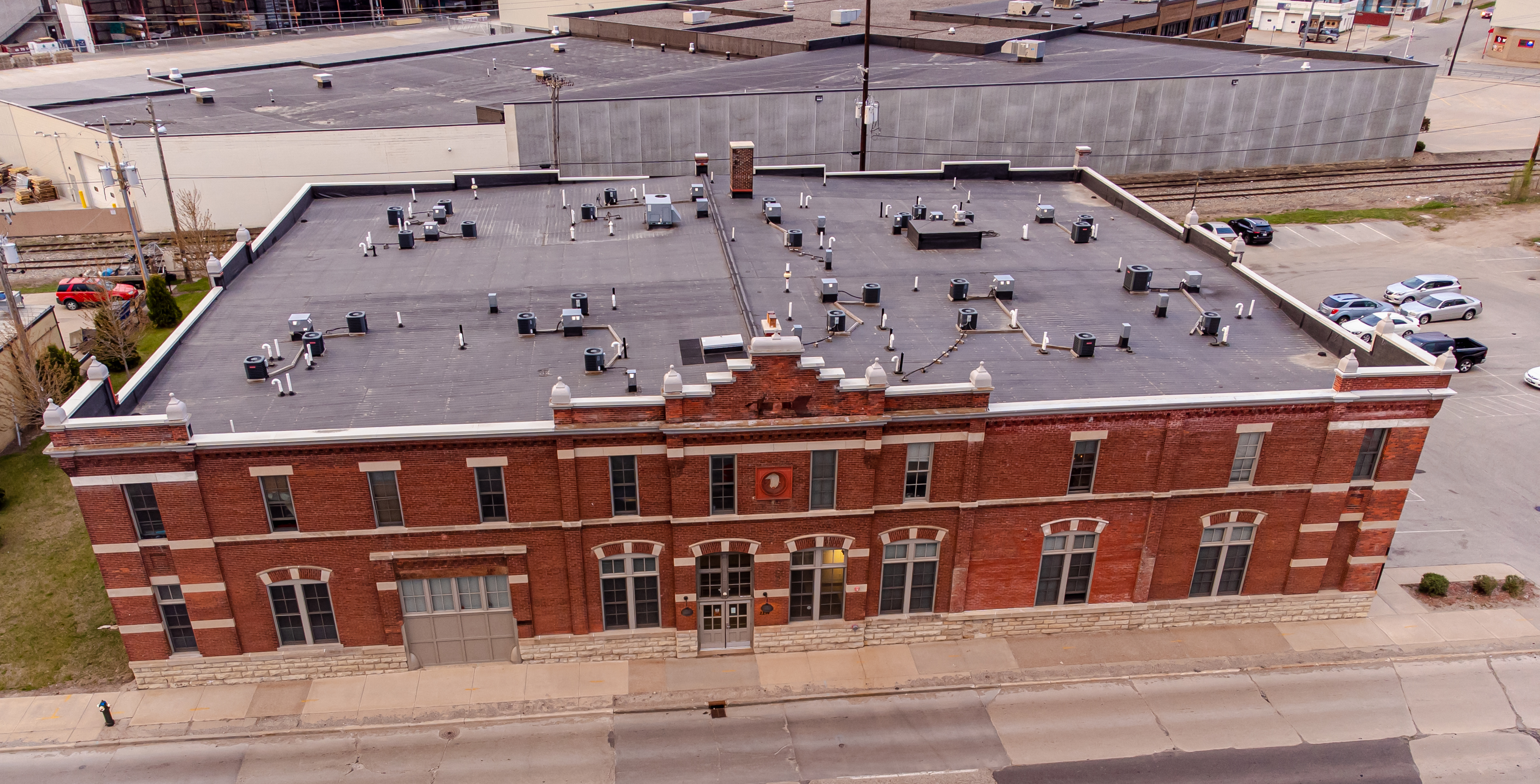

== See also ==
- The Freight House
- Historic Downtown La Crosse
- Gund Brewery Lofts
