= Gund Brewing Company Bottling Works =

- U.S. National Register of Historic Places
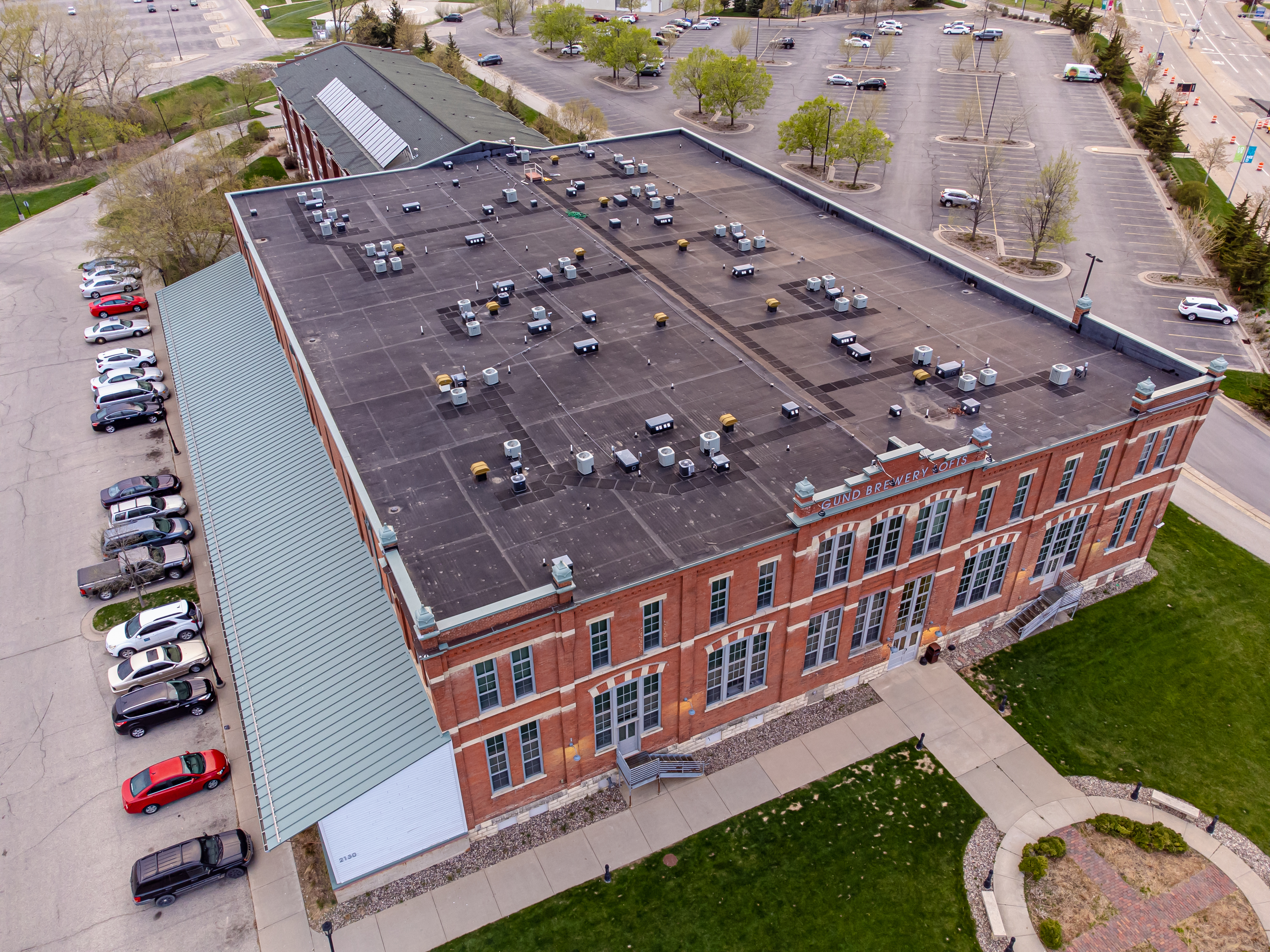

- Location within Wisconsin
- Location: 2130 South Avenue; La Crosse, Wisconsin
- Coordinates: 43°47′38″N 91°14′34″W
- Area: 5 acres (2.0 ha)
- Built: 1903
- Architect: Louis Lehle
- Architectural style: Late 19th And Early 20th Century American Movements
- NRHP reference No.: 08001202
- Added to NRHP: December 15, 2008

Gund Brewery Lofts or the old Gund Brewing Company Bottling Works was a progressive beer-bottling factory built in 1903, designed by Louis Lehle with modern sanitization and pasteurization machines that gave Gund's beer a reliable shelf life, and electrical power that allowed an efficient plant layout. The factory has now been remodeled as apartments. It is now listed on the National Register of Historic Places.

== Gallery ==
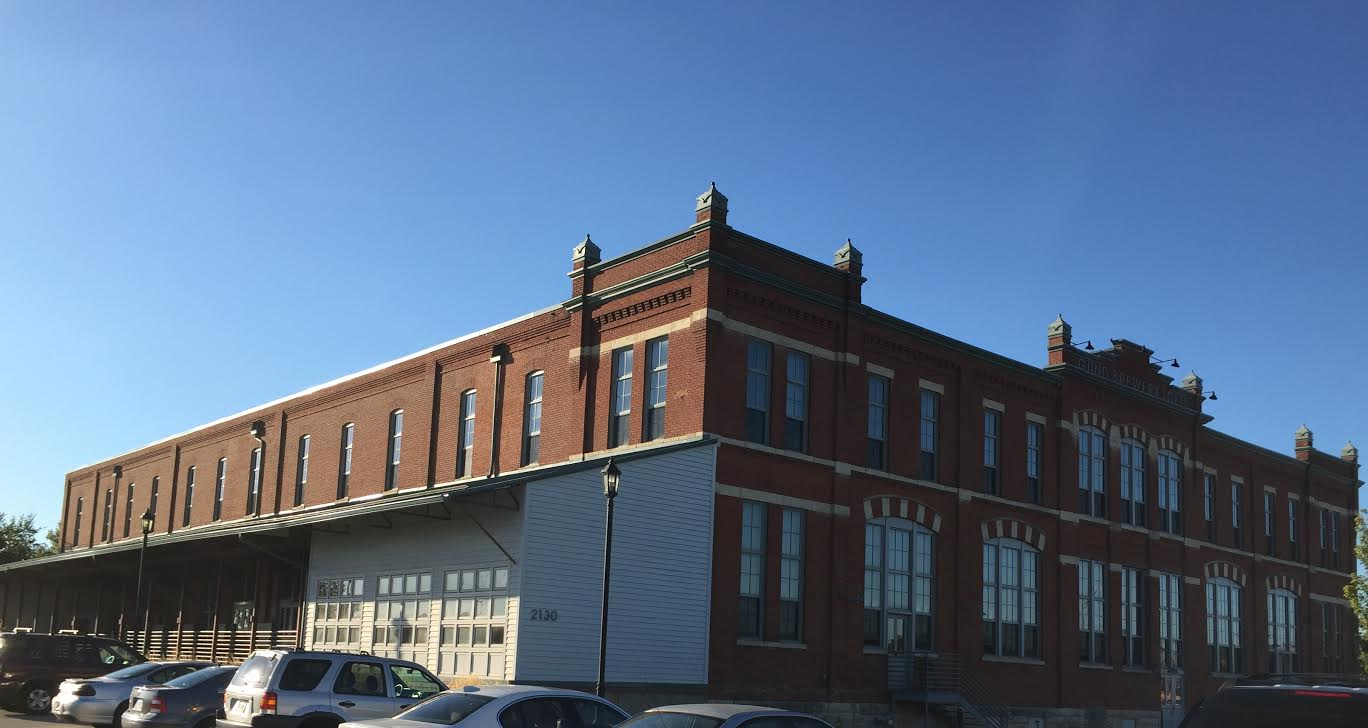

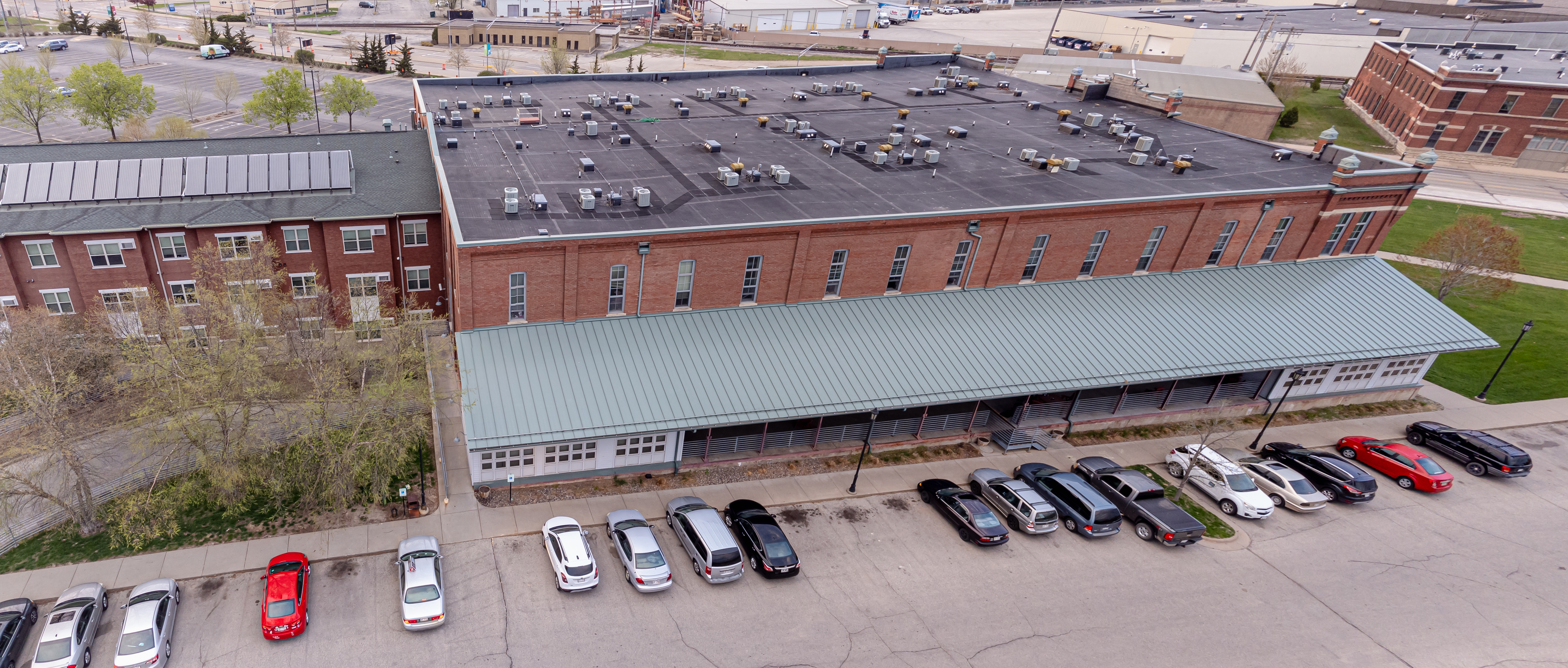
Gund Brewery Lofts in La Crosse, Wisconsin

== See also ==
- The Freight House
- La Crosse Commercial Historic District
- La Crosse Armory
