= Freight House (La Crosse, Wisconsin) =

- U.S. National Register of Historic Places
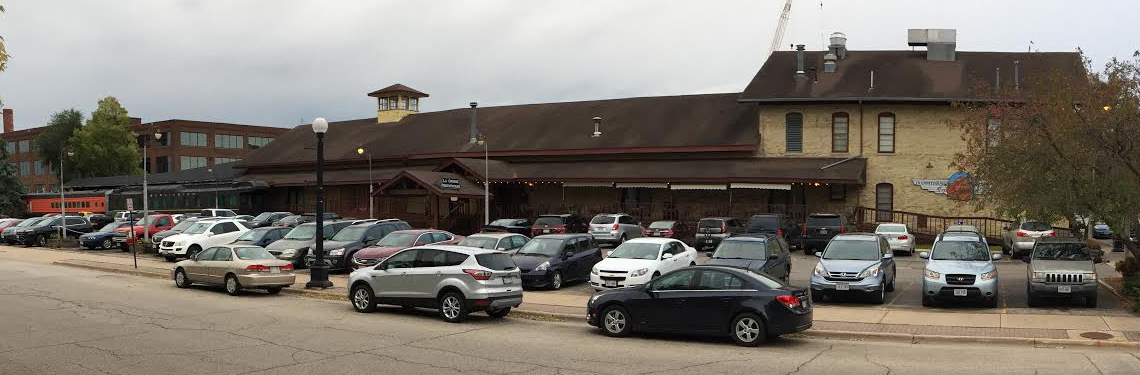

- Location within Wisconsin
- Location: 107-109 Vine St. La Crosse, Wisconsin
- Coordinates: 43°48′56″N 91°15′11″W
- Area: less than one acre
- Built: 1880
- Website: www.thefreighthouse.com
- NRHP reference No.: 82000678
- Added to NRHP: March 2, 1982

The Freight House is a restaurant in downtown La Crosse, Wisconsin located close to the river front and Riverside Park. The building was a freight house built by the Chicago, Milwaukee and St. Paul Railway in 1880, with an addition in 1904. It was converted in 1978 into a restaurant. It is on the National Register of Historic Places.

== Gallery ==
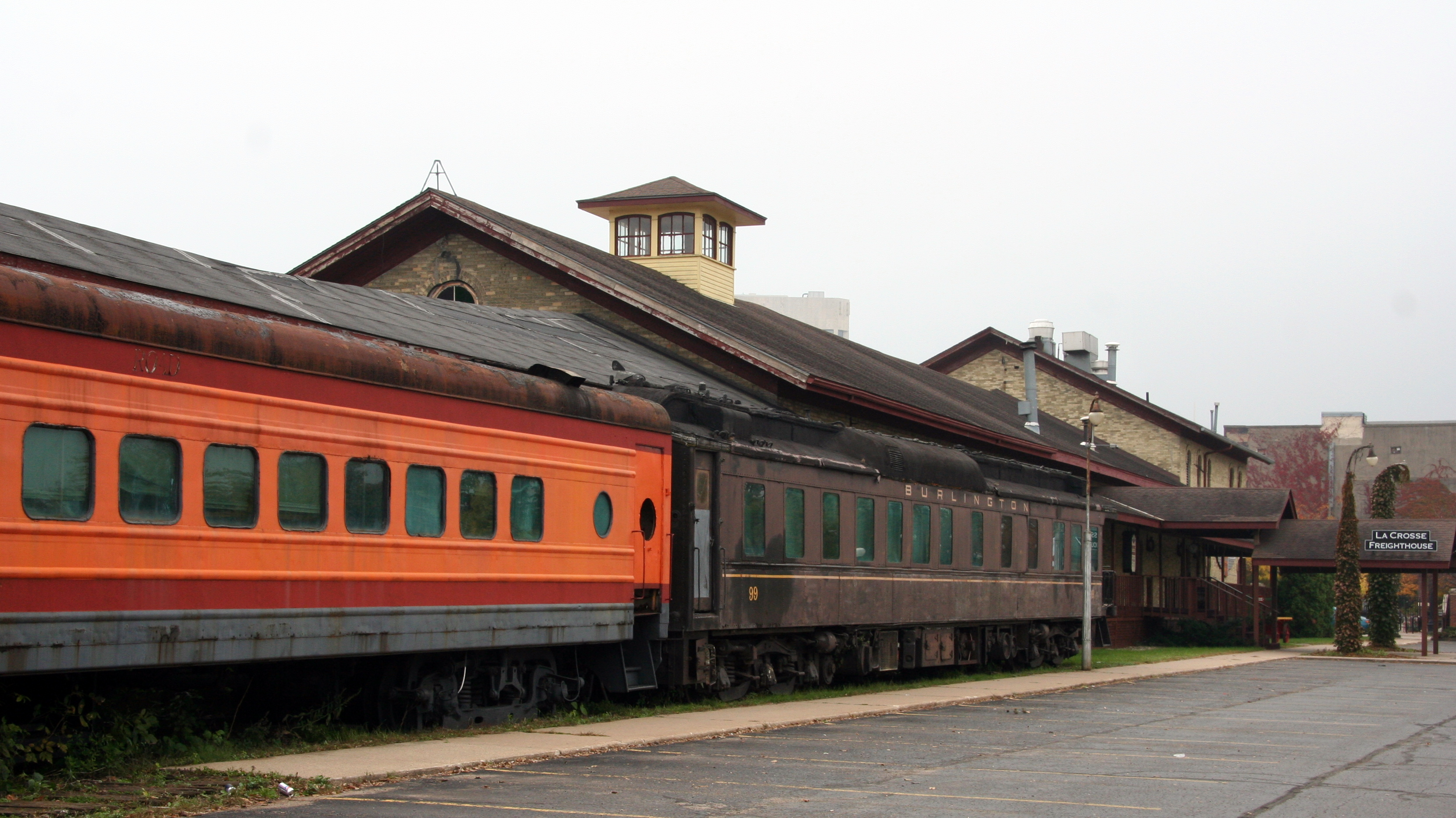
Exterior showing former railway cars

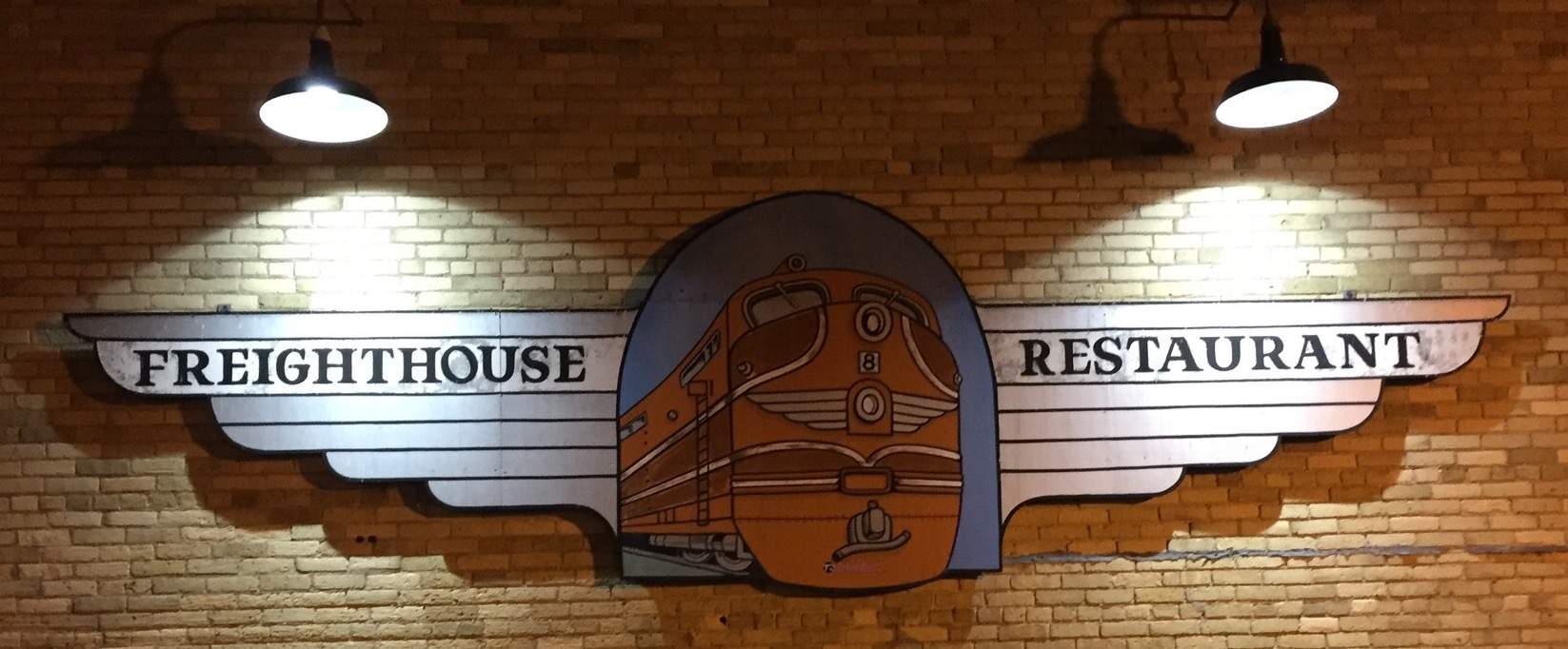
Freighthouse sign

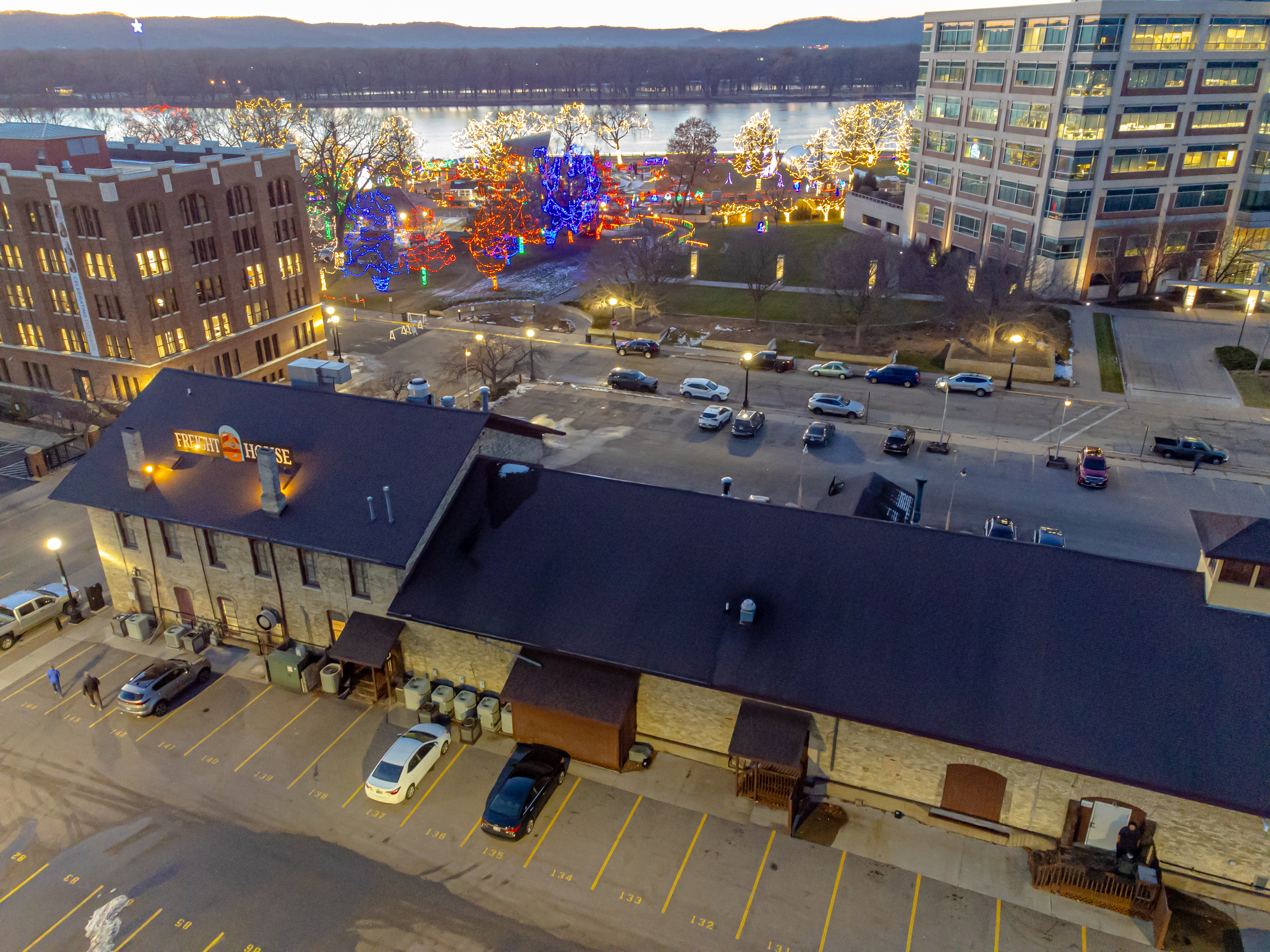
Freight House La Crosse with Rotary lights at Riverside Park in the background

== See also ==
- La Crosse Commercial Historic District (located two blocks south of the Freight House)
- Hixon House
