= La Crosse Commercial Historic District =

Historic district in Wisconsin, United States

- U.S. National Register of Historic Places
- U.S. Historic district
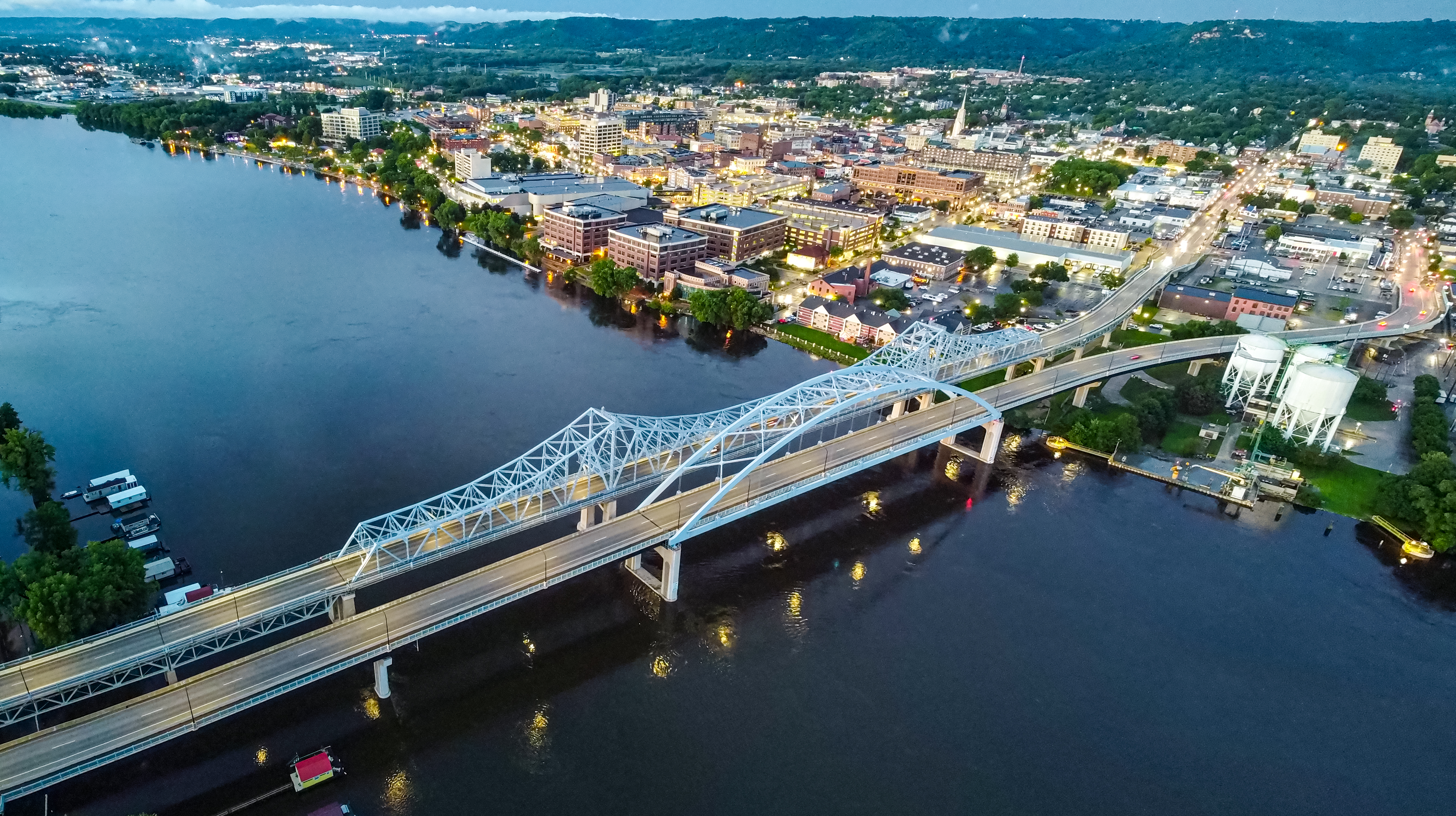

- Location within Wisconsin
- Location: Downtown La Crosse, Wisconsin
- Coordinates: 43°48′44″N 91°15′8″W
- Area: 15 acres (6.1 ha)
- Architect: Schick, Hugo, et al.; Stoltz, Gustway, et al.
- Architectural style: Classic Revival, Romanesque, Italianate
- NRHP reference No.: 94001064
- Added to NRHP: September 2, 1994

The La Crosse Commercial Historic District is located in downtown La Crosse, Wisconsin. It includes over ninety contributing structures, mostly 2-3 story commercial brick buildings constructed from the 1860s to the 1940s. The district is roughly bounded by Jay Street, Second Street South, State Street, and Fifth Avenue South.

Some of the notable contributing properties include the 1866 Voegle grocery and saloon, the 1870 Italianate Solberg grocery store, the 1894 Romanesque/Queen Anne Rehfuss dry goods building, the 1903 Chicago school Doerflinger department store, the 1920 Neoclassical Rivoli building and theatre, and the 1940 Moderne Hoeschler Exchange building.

The district currently contains numerous bars and restaurants. Downtown La Crosse once had the Guinness Book record with the most bars/nightclubs located on one street, which was Third Street. The area also includes other shops, offices, and residential spaces.

The NRHP listed Freight House is located two blocks north of the historic district.

== Gallery ==
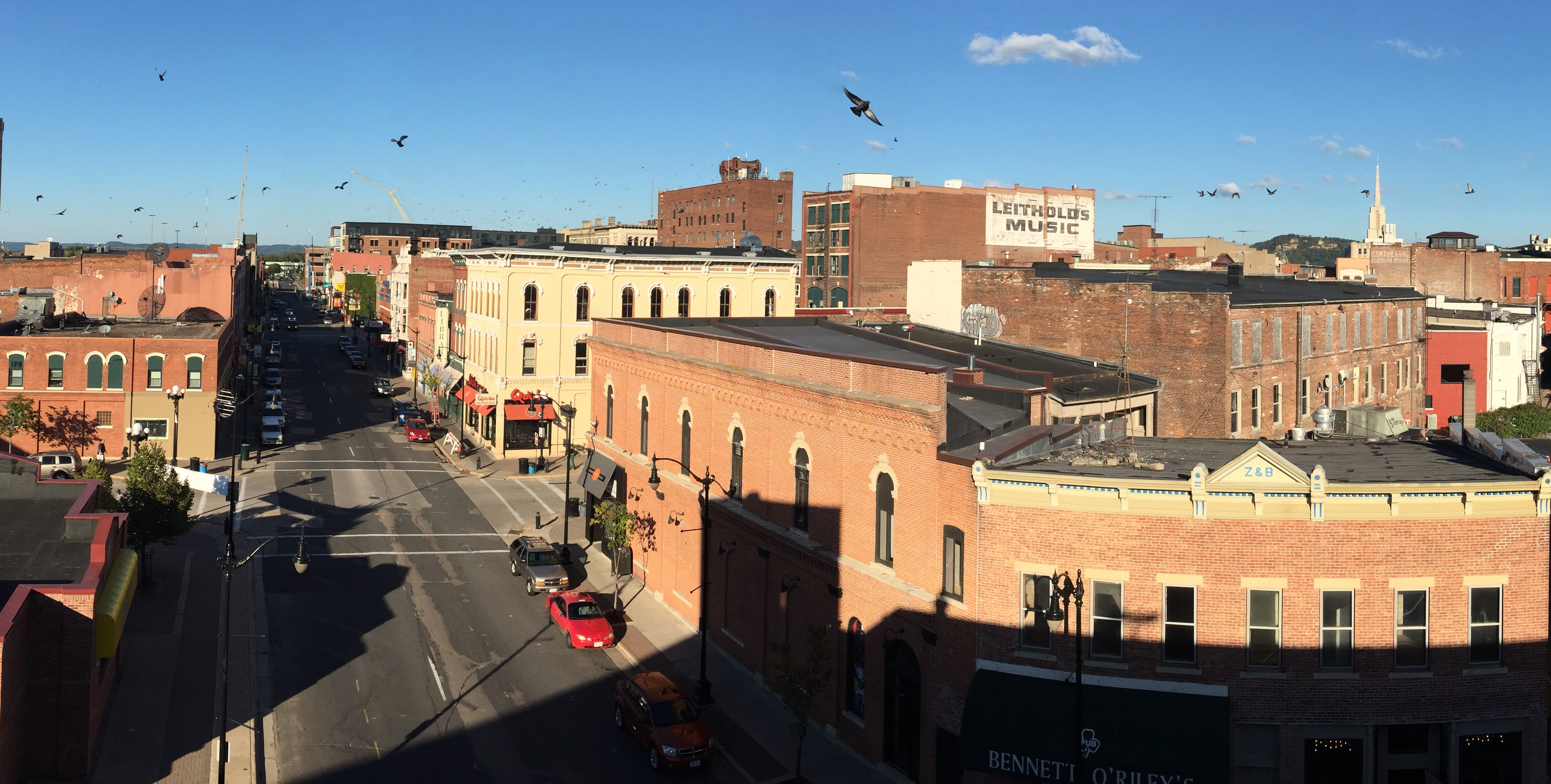
Downtown La Crosse

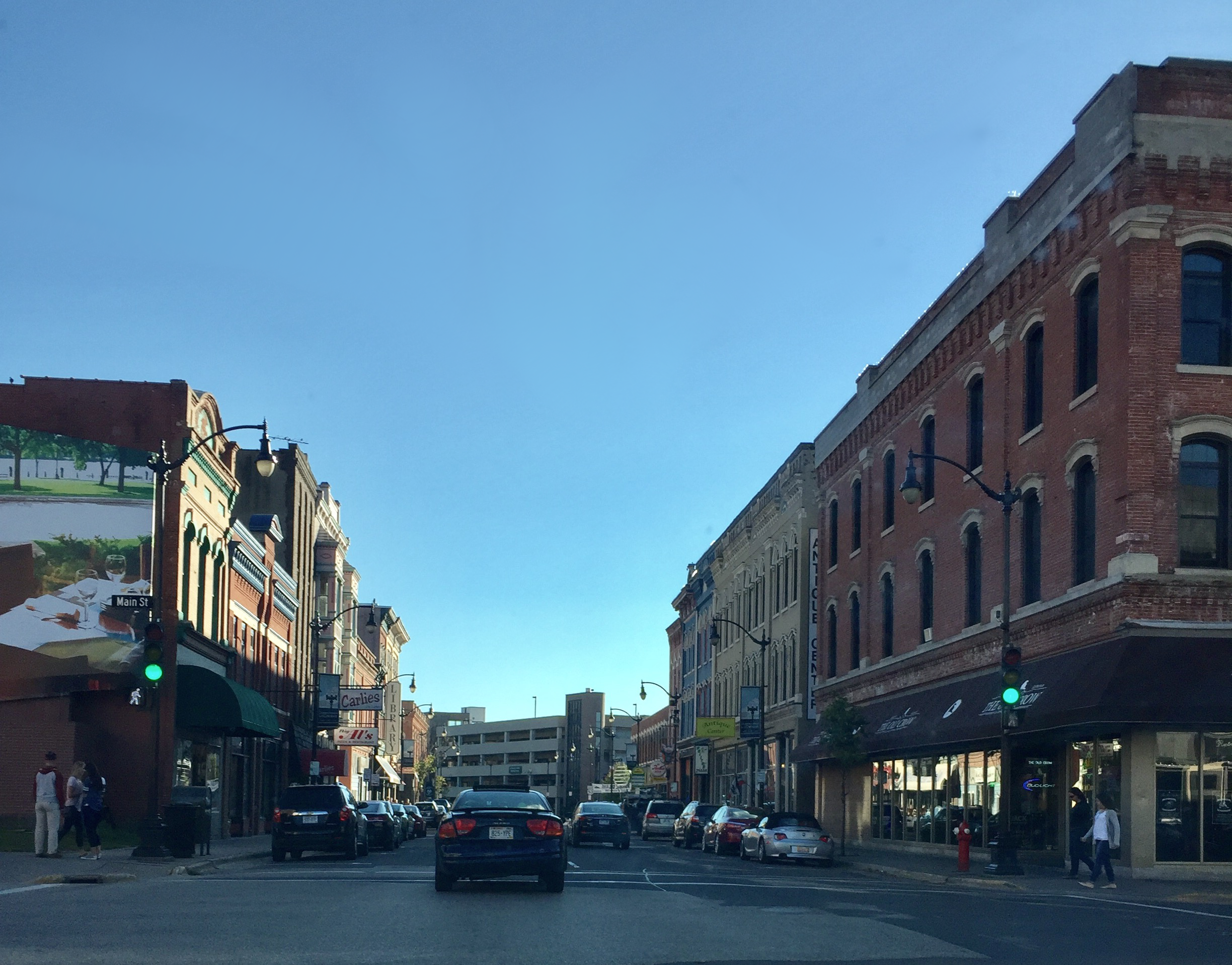
Heading south on 3rd Street

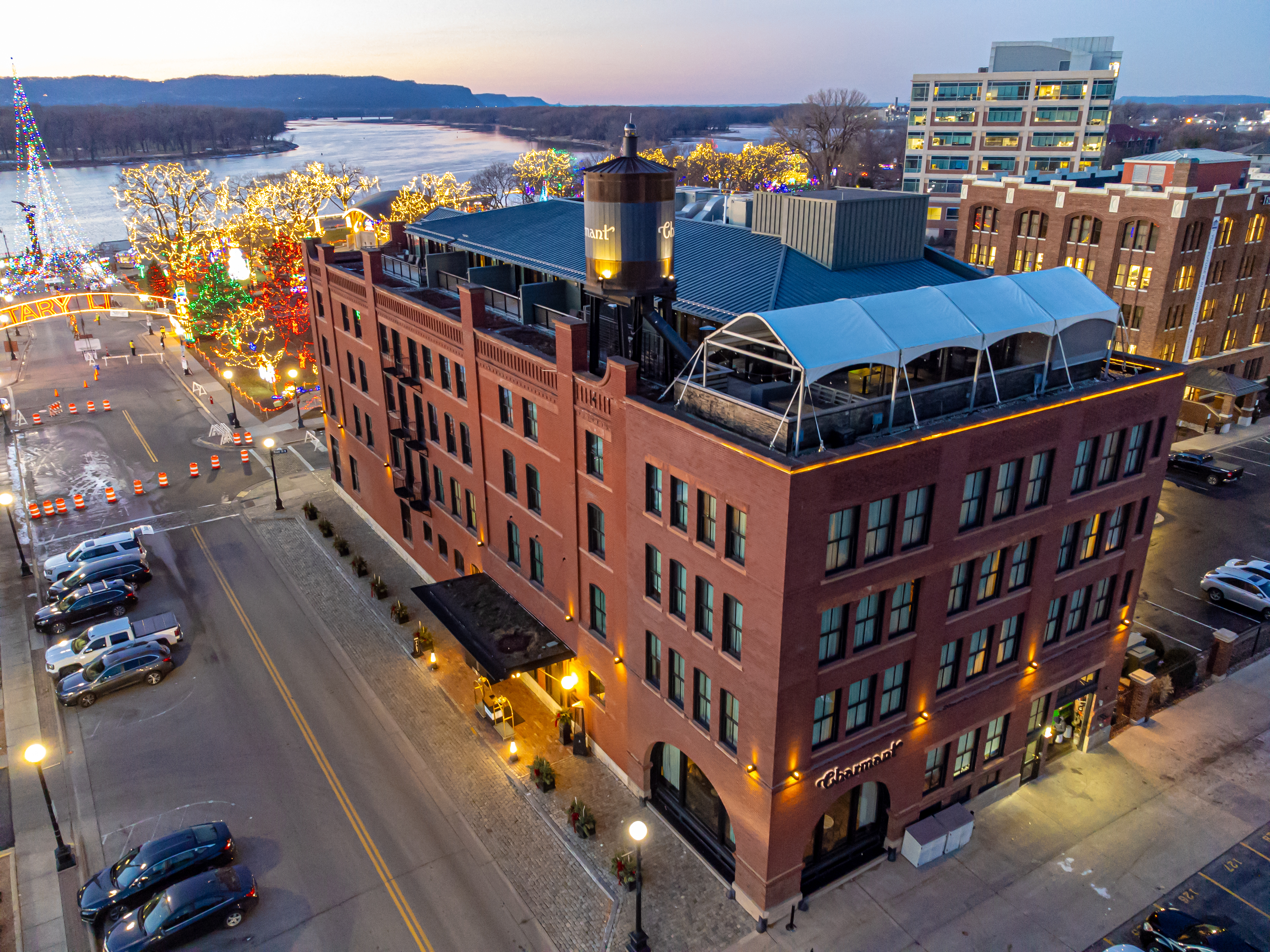
Charmant Hotel and Restaurant in downtown La Crosse

== See also ==
- Riverside Park
- The Freight House
