= National Register of Historic Places listings in Juneau County, Wisconsin =

Location of Juneau County in Wisconsin

This is a list of the National Register of Historic Places listings in Juneau County, Wisconsin. It is intended to provide a comprehensive listing of entries in the National Register of Historic Places that are located in Juneau County, Wisconsin. The locations of National Register properties for which the latitude and longitude coordinates are included below may be seen in a map.

There are 9 properties and districts listed on the National Register in the county.

This National Park Service list is complete through NPS recent listings posted April 18, 2025.

== Current listings ==
	Name on the Register	Image	Date listed	Location	City or town	Description
1	Henry and Barbara Bierbauer House	Henry and Barbara Bierbauer House	June 14, 2016 (#16000379)	970 S. Monroe St. 43°52′11″N 90°09′58″W	New Lisbon	2-story Italianate house with cream brick walls, a full-width flat-roofed porch, and a cupola, built in 1869. Henry founded the New Lisbon Brewery.
2	Benjamin Boorman House	Benjamin Boorman House	May 4, 1976 (#76000066)	211 N. Union St. 43°47′57″N 90°04′15″W	Mauston	Victorian house begun in 1875 by Boorman, owner of Mauston's early grist mill, lumber mill and carding mill. Now the home of the Juneau County Historical Society.
3	Cranberry Creek Archeological District	Cranberry Creek Archeological District	July 19, 1984 (#84003689)	West of the intersection of routes G and F, west of New Miner; 44°09′55″N 90°03′46″W	Armenia	Mound complex constructed by Woodland people around 100-800 CE. Includes hundreds of low conical mounds, mostly in lines. Also a bird effigy and a bear or panther.
4	Gee's Slough Mound Group	Gee's Slough Mound Group	March 8, 1978 (#78000108)	S of New Lisbon on Mounds View Rd; 43°52′03″N 90°09′18″W	New Lisbon	Linear mounds, conical mounds, and a running panther effigy mound constructed by Native Americans of the Woodland period.
5	Juneau County Courthouse	Juneau County Courthouse	November 4, 1982 (#82001846)	220 E. State St. 43°47′47″N 90°04′31″W	Mauston	Modern-styled courthouse built in 1938 with help of the WPA.
6	Lemonweir Glyphs	Lemonweir Glyphs	November 4, 1993 (#93001173)	Address Restricted	Kildare	Set of carvings in the sandstone wall of a bluff near the Lemonweir River, including animals and arrangements of lines.
7	William and Mary Shelton Farmstead	William and Mary Shelton Farmstead	August 4, 2004 (#04000810)	N2397 Cty Hwy K 43°43′37″N 90°03′32″W	Seven Mile Creek	Farmhouse started in 1863. In the 1920s the farm was state of the art, based on advice from university and farming magazines.
8	Sprague Bridge	Sprague Bridge	January 23, 1995 (#94001574)	Over the Yellow R. SE of Finley, Finley Township; 44°11′11″N 90°06′15″W	Finley	Pratt half-hip pony truss bridge, constructed in 1913.
9	Weston-Babcock House	Weston-Babcock House	January 29, 1979 (#79000089)	407 Main St. 44°01′20″N 90°04′12″W	Necedah	Neoclassical home built in 1860 by Thomas Weston, an early settler and founder of the lumber enterprise T. Weston & Co., which at one time sawed ten million board feet of lumber per year. Charles Babcock founded the Necedah Bank.

== See also ==
- List of National Historic Landmarks in Wisconsin
- National Register of Historic Places listings in Wisconsin
- Listings in neighboring counties: Adams, Columbia, Jackson, Monroe, Sauk, Vernon, Wood
