= Cranberry Creek Archeological District =

Historic district in Wisconsin, United States

- U.S. National Register of Historic Places
- U.S. Historic district
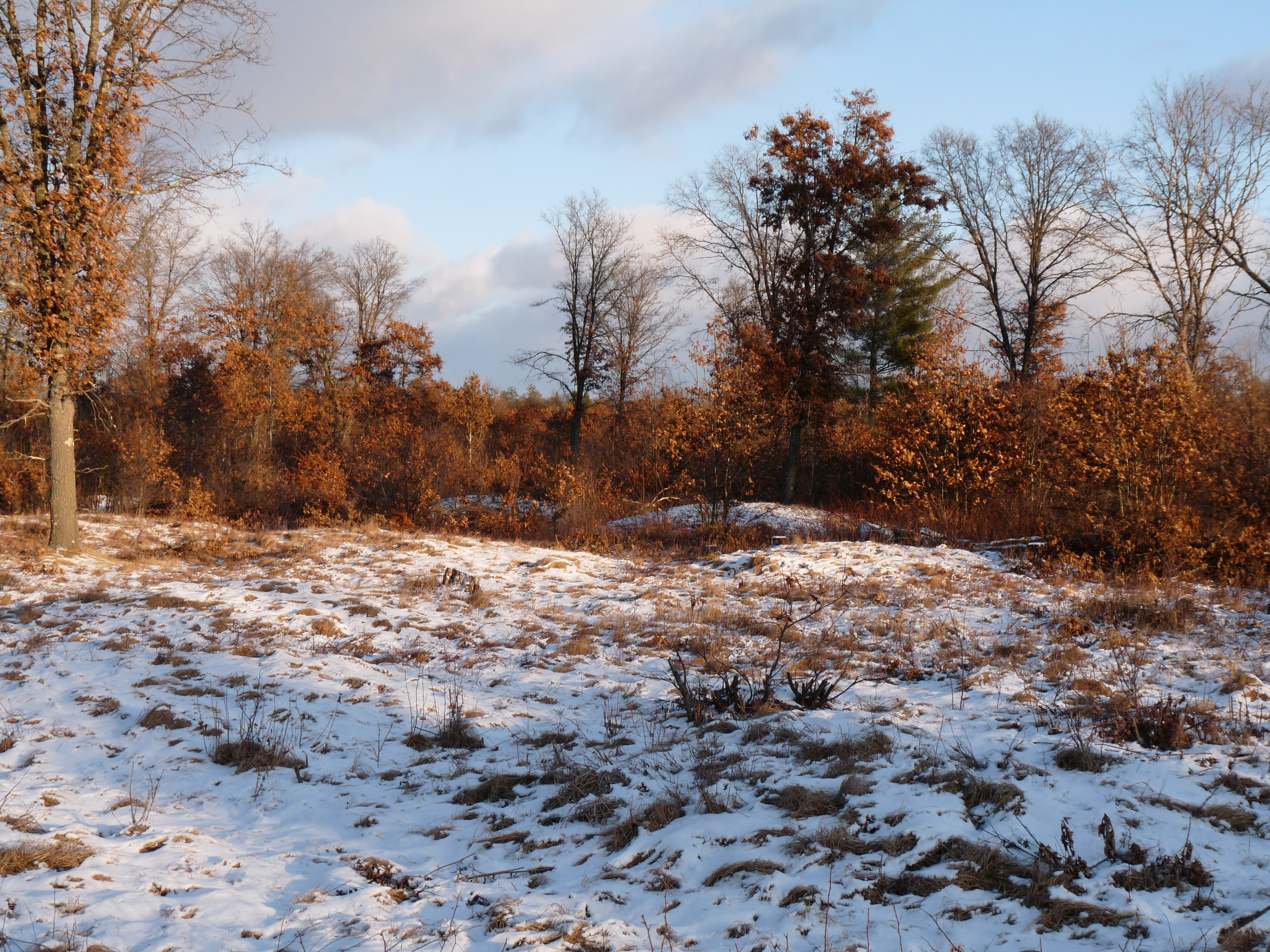
- Cranberry Creek Archaeological District
- Location: Address restricted
- Nearest city: New Miner, Wisconsin
- Area: 140 acres (57 ha)
- NRHP reference No.: 84003689
- Added to NRHP: July 19, 1984

Cranberry Creek Archeological District, also known as Cranberry Creek Mound Group, is an ancient American Indian burial mound site from circa AD 100–800 near New Miner, Wisconsin, United States. It is three miles east of Necedah National Wildlife Refuge in Juneau County. It is part of the "effigy mound culture" of native peoples in Wisconsin, who practiced the "respectful burial of their dead".

Humans first inhabited Wisconsin about 12,000 years ago, and the use of burial mounds developed in between 500 BC to 1000 AD during what is referred to as the Woodland period. The burial mounds during the late Woodland period tended to be built as effigies of birds, bears, and panthers, and examples of these can be found in the Cranberry Creek Archeological District. As with other burial mounds on state property, the mounds in this region are protected against unauthorized disturbance. Many of the best examples of mounds in this area are on the east side of Cranberry Creek. In addition to effigies, conical, linear, and oval mounds are found. Although archeological studies have been conducted here since 1917, and farming has damaged parts of the northern cluster, the cluster in the southern section is essentially unaltered by modern man. Cranberry Creek Archeological District encompasses one of the larger mound groups in Wisconsin with over 300 mounds, and possibly up to 500 mounds.

Cranberry Creek Mound Group is owned by the Wisconsin Department of Natural Resources, and covers 675 acres (273 ha). The area is heavily forested, containing river birch, silver maple, red maple, jack pine, and oak. It is a State Natural Area since 1986.

In addition to the Cranberry Creek Archeological District, Juneau County has two other related National Register of Historic Places: Gee's Slough Mound Group (ref: 78000108), which is also from the Woodland culture, and Lemonweir Glyphs (ref: 93001173).

== See also ==
- National Register of Historic Places listings in Wisconsin
