= Bierbauer =

Bierbauer (literally meaning "beer farmer" in German) is a surname of German origin. Notable people with the surname include:

- Charles Bierbauer (1942–2025), American journalist and television news anchor
- Lou Bierbauer (1865–1926), American baseball player of German descent

== See also ==
- Henry and Barbara Bierbauer House, a historic house in New Lisbon, Wisconsin
