= Jessica Powers =

American poet

- Jessica Powers
- Born: February 7, 1905; Mauston, Wisconsin
- Died: August 18, 1988 (aged 83); Pewaukee, Wisconsin
- Education: Marquette University
- Occupations: Carmelite Nun, poet

Jessica Powers (February 7, 1905 – August 18, 1988) was an American poet and Carmelite nun.

== Biography ==
=== Early years (1905–1936) ===
Jessica Powers was born on February 7, 1905, in Mauston, Wisconsin, the third child to John Powers and Delia Trainer Powers. By the time Jessica had turned 13, she lost both her older sister and father. She graduated from Mauston High School in 1922 and attended Marquette University for a year studying journalism. She then worked in Chicago before returning to care for her family after the death of her mother from 1925 to 1936.

=== Carmelite community (1941–1988) ===
After spending time in New York City, Powers decided to enter the Milwaukee, Wisconsin community of the Carmel of Mother of God as a postulant on June 24, 1941. On April 25, 1942, she received the habit of the Carmelites and was given the religious name of Sister Miriam of the Holy Spirit. She died of a stroke on August 18, 1988.

== Books ==
- The Lantern Burns. New York: Monastine Press, 1939.
- The Place of Splendor. New York: Cosmopolitan Science and Art Service, 1946.
- The Little Alphabet. Milwaukee: Bruce Publishing Co., 1955.
- Journey to Bethlehem. Pewaukee, WI: Carmelite Monastery, 1980.
- The House at Rest. Pewaukee, WI: Carmelite Monsastery, 1984.
- Selected Poetry of Jessica Powers. Regina Siegfried and Robert Morneau, eds. Kansas City, MO: Sheed & Ward, 1989.

== Archival collections ==
The Jessica Powers Papers are held by the Marquette University Special Collections and University Archives. The collection includes her correspondence (mostly letters received), handwritten and typescript drafts of poems, clippings of her poetry and other writings from newspapers and magazines, and writings about her. Notable correspondents included August Derleth, Raymond E. F. Larsson, Robert F. Morneau, and Regina Siegfried.
