= Florence E. Ward =

American educator

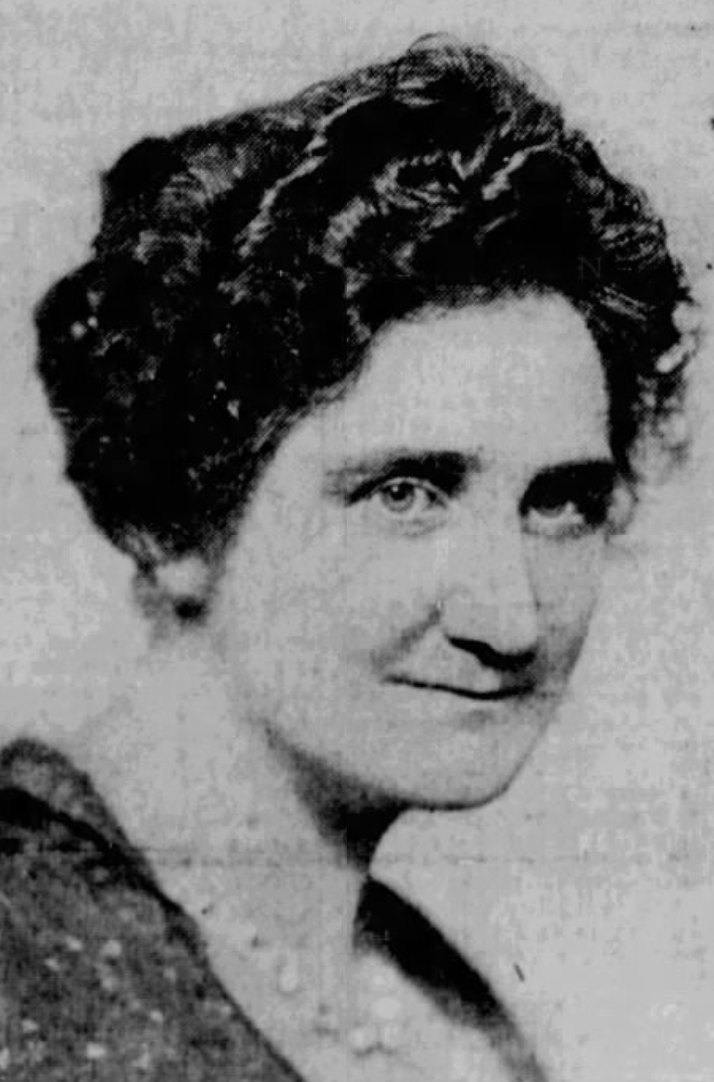
- Florence E. Ward, from a 1915 newspaper
- Born: Florence Elizabeth Ward; February 1871; Mauston, Wisconsin, U.S.
- Died: February 23, 1934 (age 62); Washington, D.C. U.S.
- Occupation(s): Educator, government official
- Known for: Chief, Eastern Division, Office of Cooperative Extension Work, USDA

Florence Elizabeth Ward (February 1871 – February 23, 1934) was an American educator and government official. After a career in academia focused on Kindergarten education, she became an official in the United States Department of Agriculture, addressing the needs of rural women as Eastern Division head of the USDA's Office of Cooperative Extension Work.

== Early life and education ==
Ward was born in Mauston, Wisconsin, the daughter of Lemuel J. Ward and Elizabeth (Libby) Harrington Ward. Her father was a Union Army veteran of the American Civil War. She graduated from the National Kindergarten College in Chicago in 1903. She studied with Maria Montessori in Italy.

== Career ==
Ward taught at Iowa State Teachers College. She was the first president of the Iowa Kindergarten Union in 1908. In 1914 she was chair of the National Kindergarten Association, and traveled in Europe to study school conditions abroad. She was briefly a professor of vocational education at Washington State University.

Ward left academia to work on the federal food conservation programs during World War I. She was head of the Eastern Division of the Office of Cooperative Extension Work, a program of the United States Department of Agriculture (USDA). She supervised a survey concerning the lives of farm women in 1919. She gave lectures on her work at conferences and on national radio broadcasts, including "New Social Horizons of the Farm Woman" (1929).

== Publications ==
- The Montessori Method and the American School (1913)
- "Extension Work with Farm Women" (1916)
- "Finer Home-Making: The Farm Woman and 'Extension'" (1926)
- "Home demonstration work under the Smith-Lever Act, 1914-1924" (1929)
- "How to find economic facts and apply them as a basis for extension programs in home economics, dairying, and forestry" (1929)

== Personal life ==
Ward lived in Alexandria, Virginia. She died from double pneumonia in 1934, at the age of 62, at Garfield Hospital in Washington, D.C., shortly after attending the dedication of a memorial to Martha Van Rensselaer at Cornell University.
