= Necedah National Wildlife Refuge =

National Wildlife Refuge in Juneau County, Wisconsin

- IUCN category IV (habitat/species management area)
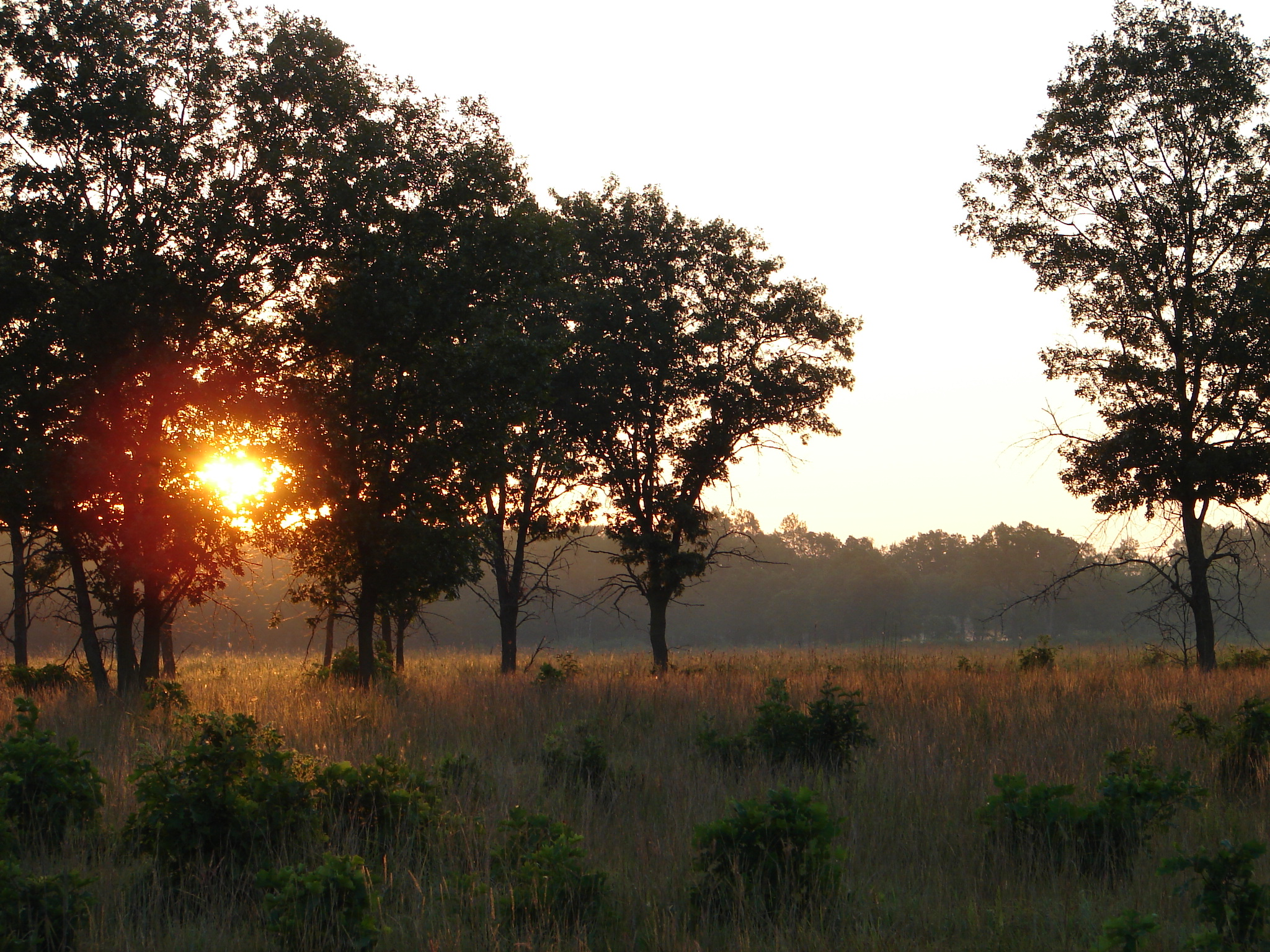
- Sunset on savanna at Necedah National Wildlife Refuge

- Location within Wisconsin Location within the United States
- Location: Juneau County, Wisconsin, United States
- Nearest city: Necedah, Wisconsin
- Coordinates: 44°07′00″N 90°10′00″W
- Area: 43,696 acres (176.83 km^{2})
- Established: 1939
- Governing body: U.S. Fish and Wildlife Service
- Website: Necedah National Wildlife Refuge

Necedah National Wildlife Refuge is a 43,696-acre (176.83 km^{2}) National Wildlife Refuge located in northern Juneau County, Wisconsin near the village of Necedah. It was established in 1939 and is famous as the northern nesting site for reintroduction of an eastern United States population of the endangered whooping crane.

== Geography and public access ==
Necedah National Wildlife Refuge is located within the 7,800-square-mile (20,000 km^{2}) Great Central Wisconsin Swamp, the largest wetland bog in the state. It includes extensive forest habitat (pine, oak, aspen) and large tracts of rare oak barrens habitat.

The refuge has a 13-person staff and receives 150,000 visitors annually. It allows for hunting and fishing, in addition to blueberry, blackberry, and raspberry picking. Refuge operations are largely funded through timber sales.

== Fauna ==
In 2001, the Whooping Crane Eastern Partnership raised whooping crane (Grus americana) chicks in the refuge before guiding them to Florida's Chassahowitzka National Wildlife Refuge, utilizing ultra-light aircraft to teach the birds the migratory pathway. That population has been successful and by 2010 there were up to 105 migrating birds established in the eastern United States for the first time in over 100 years.

Other threatened or rare species at the site include the Karner blue butterfly, massasauga rattlesnake, Blanding's turtle, and Great Lakes-boreal wolf packs. In most years the refuge is also an important stopover for migratory waterfowl on the Mississippi Flyway.

== See also ==
- Cranberry Creek Archeological District
