= Edwin M. Truell =

American soldier

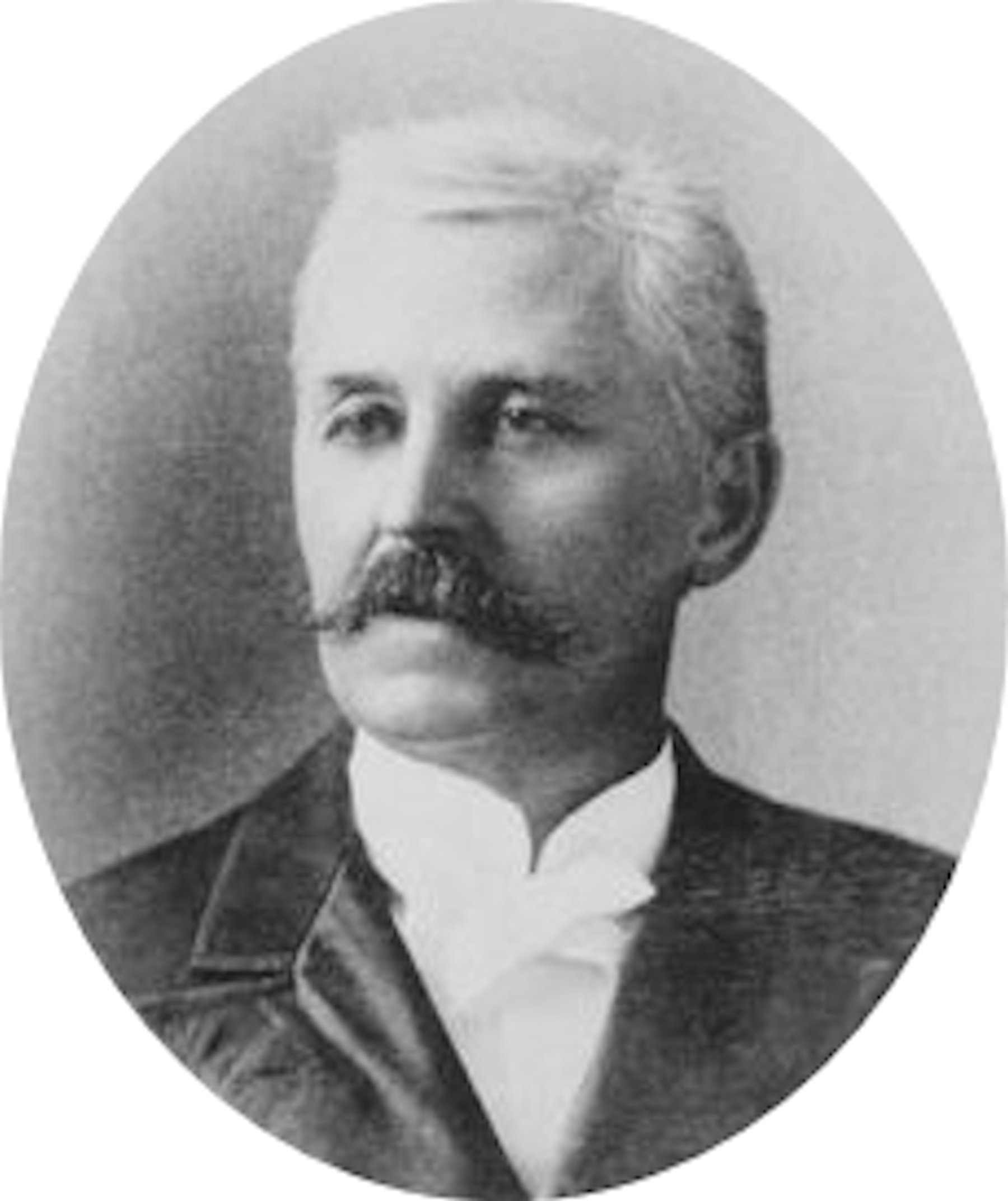
- Born: August 19, 1841; Lowell, Massachusetts, U.S.
- Died: October 12, 1907 (aged 66)
- Burial place: Arlington National Cemetery
- Military career
- Allegiance: United States; Union
- Branch: United States Army; Union Army
- Service years: 1862 - 1865
- Rank: 1st Lieutenant
- Unit: 12th Wisconsin Volunteer Infantry Regiment
- Conflicts: American Civil War
- Awards: Medal of Honor

Edwin M. Truell (August 19, 1841 – October 12, 1907) was a Union Army soldier during the American Civil War who received the Medal of Honor.

== Biography ==
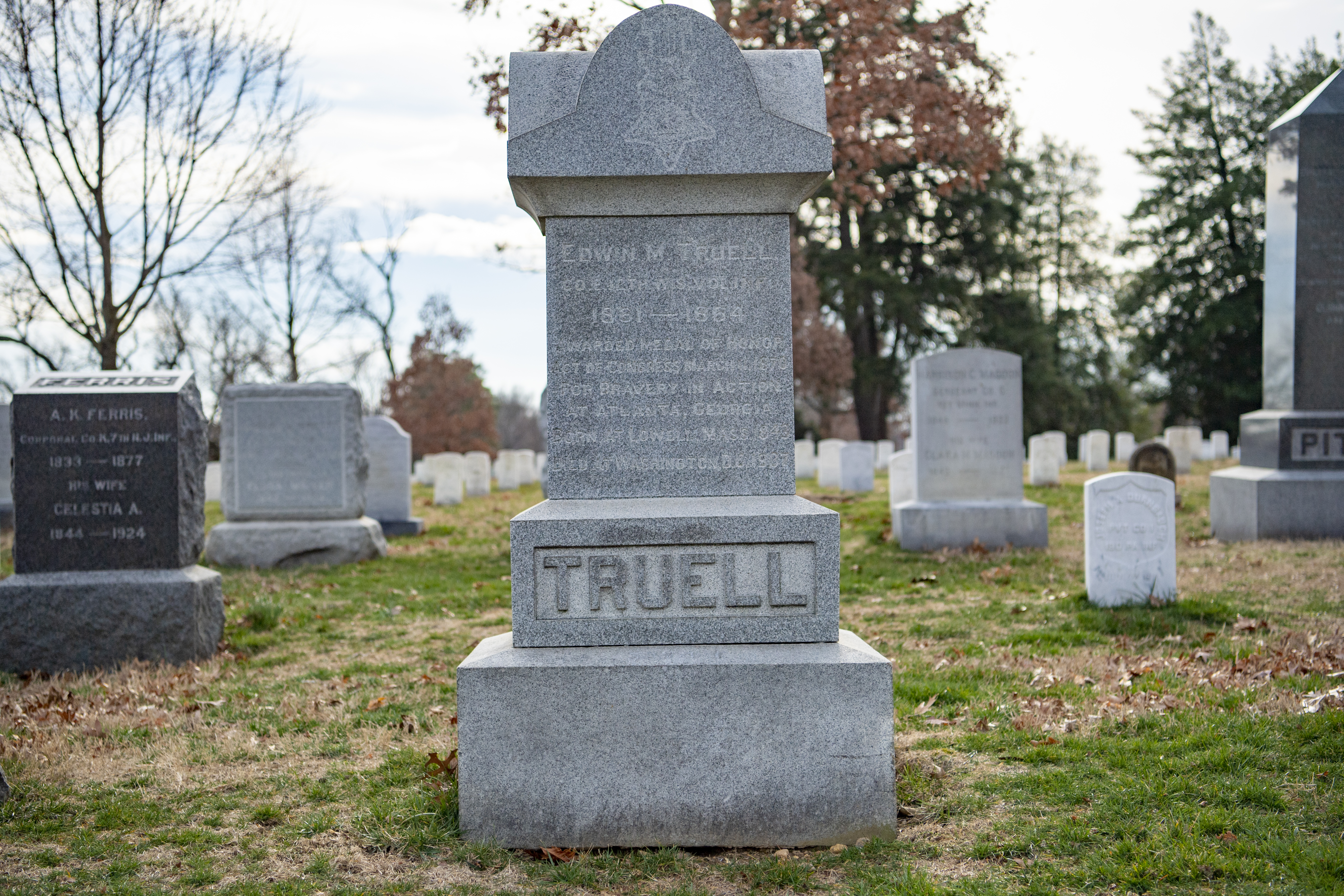
Grave at Arlington National Cemetery

Truell was born on August 19, 1841, in Lowell, Massachusetts. He joined the 12th Wisconsin Volunteer Infantry Regiment from Mauston, Wisconsin in August 1862, and mustered out with the regiment in May 1865. He died on October 12, 1907, and was buried at Arlington National Cemetery in Arlington County, Virginia.

== Medal of Honor citation ==
His award citation reads:

For extraordinary heroism on 21 July 1864, while serving with Company E, 12th Wisconsin Infantry, in action at Atlanta, Georgia. Although severely wounded in a charge, Private Truell remained with the regiment until again severely wounded, losing his leg.

== See also ==
- List of Medal of Honor recipients
- List of American Civil War Medal of Honor recipients: T–Z
