= Lemonweir Glyphs =

Historic petroglyphs in Wisconsin, United States

- U.S. National Register of Historic Places
- U.S. Historic district
- Area: 140 acres (57 ha)
- NRHP reference No.: 93001173
- Added to NRHP: November 4, 1983

The Lemonweir Glyphs (or petroglyphs) are a set of carvings by early Native Americans near the Lemonweir River in Juneau County, Wisconsin. They were listed on the National Register of Historic Places in 1983.

Some time before recorded history, people in Wisconsin's Driftless Area climbed partway up a bluff above a river and carved marks on a sheltered spot in a sandstone wall. Some of the marks are indecipherable, but others depict animals: a fish, a deer or elk, a thunderbird, a heron or crane, a buffalo, a lizard, and a deer or antelope. The largest animal is twelve inches tall. The deepest carvings are nearly a half inch deep and the shallowest are only faintly visible. Some of the images have been damaged by modern initial-cutters.

Nearby, more marks are cut into a seven-foot sandstone boulder. The top and one side are cut with various arrangements of vertical, horizontal and diagonal lines - all abstract, with no animals.
