= William and Mary Shelton Farmstead =

- U.S. National Register of Historic Places
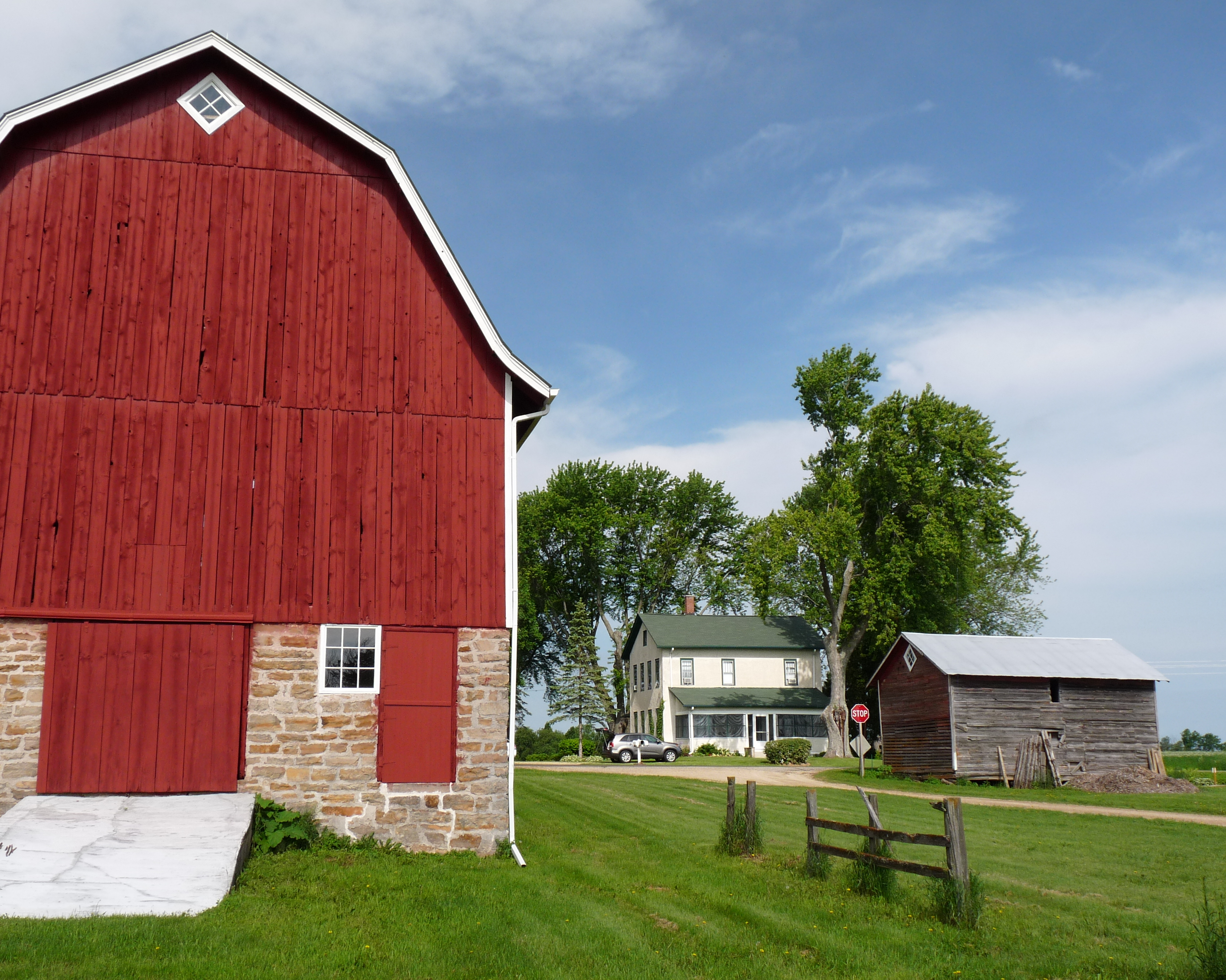
- Location: Seven Mile Creek, Wisconsin
- Coordinates: 43.72737°N 90.05936°W
- NRHP reference No.: 04000810
- Added to NRHP: August 4, 2004

The William and Mary Shelton Farmstead is located in Seven Mile Creek, Wisconsin, United States. It was added to the National Register of Historic Places in 2004.

== History ==
William Shelton moved to the property in 1907 after he married Mary Powers, the daughter of the landowner. Both the Shelton and Powers families were Irish immigrants. William and Mary's descendants continue to own the property.
