= Benjamin Boorman House =

Historic house in Wisconsin, United States

- U.S. National Register of Historic Places
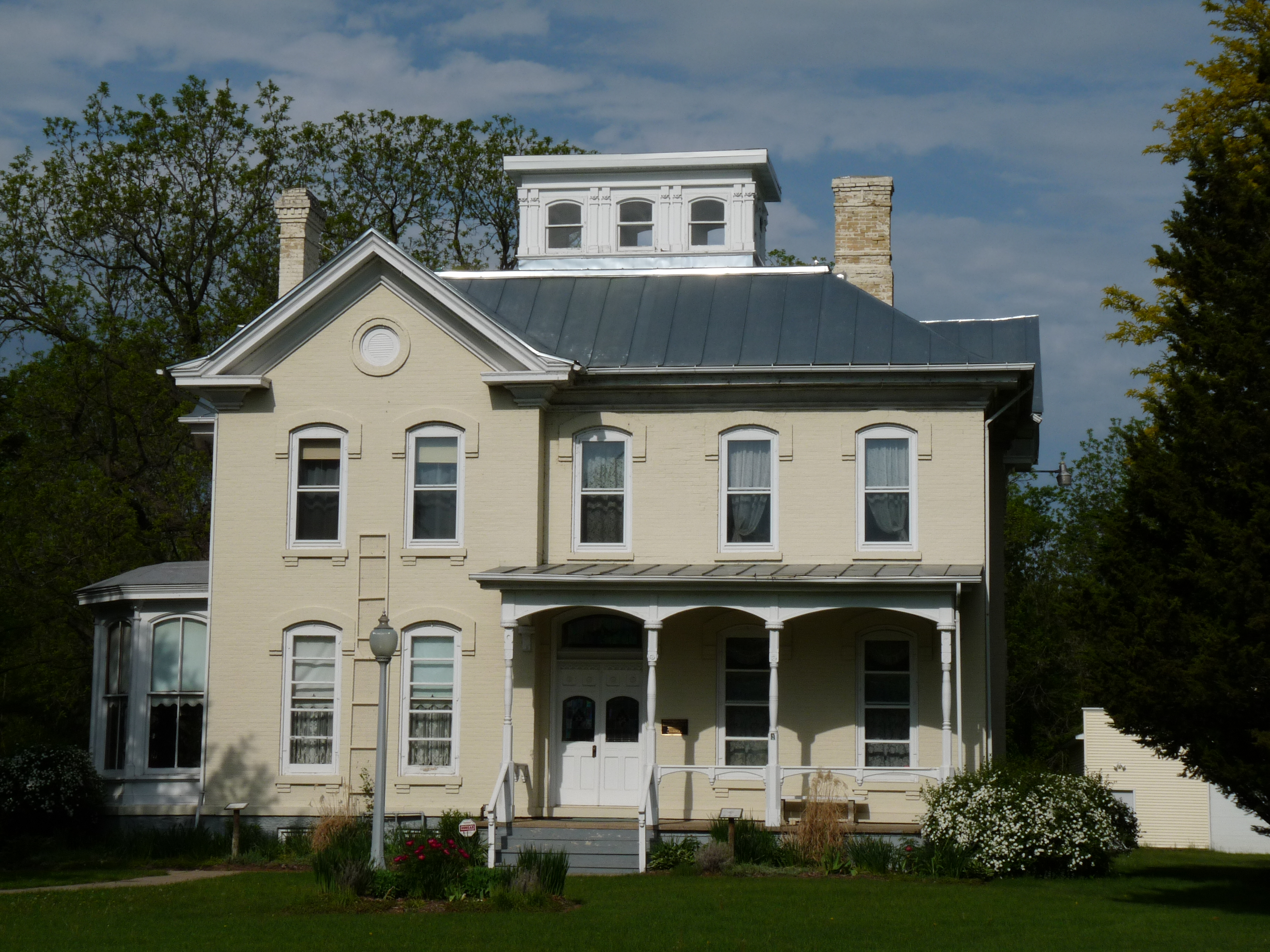

- Location within Wisconsin Location within the United States
- Location: 211 N. Union St. Mauston, Wisconsin
- Coordinates: 43°47′57″N 90°4′15″W
- Area: 2.0 acres (0.81 ha)
- Built: 1877
- Architect: Benjamin Boorman
- Architectural style: Italian Villa
- NRHP reference No.: 76000066
- Added to NRHP: May 4, 1976

The Benjamin Boorman House is a historic 19th century residence located at 211 North Union Street in Mauston, Wisconsin. It was added to the National Register of Historic Places on May 4, 1976.

== History ==
The house was built by English immigrant Benjamin Boorman for himself and his first wife Elizabeth Boorman. After Benjamin Boorman's death, the house was owned by Jeff T. Heath, Tom Powers, John Tremain, and Francis Gardner.

== Museum ==
The Juneau County Historical Society was formed at the house in 1963. In 1987, the society purchased the house from Edward W. Pierce and transformed it into a historic house museum.
