= Gee's Slough Mound Group =

- U.S. National Register of Historic Places
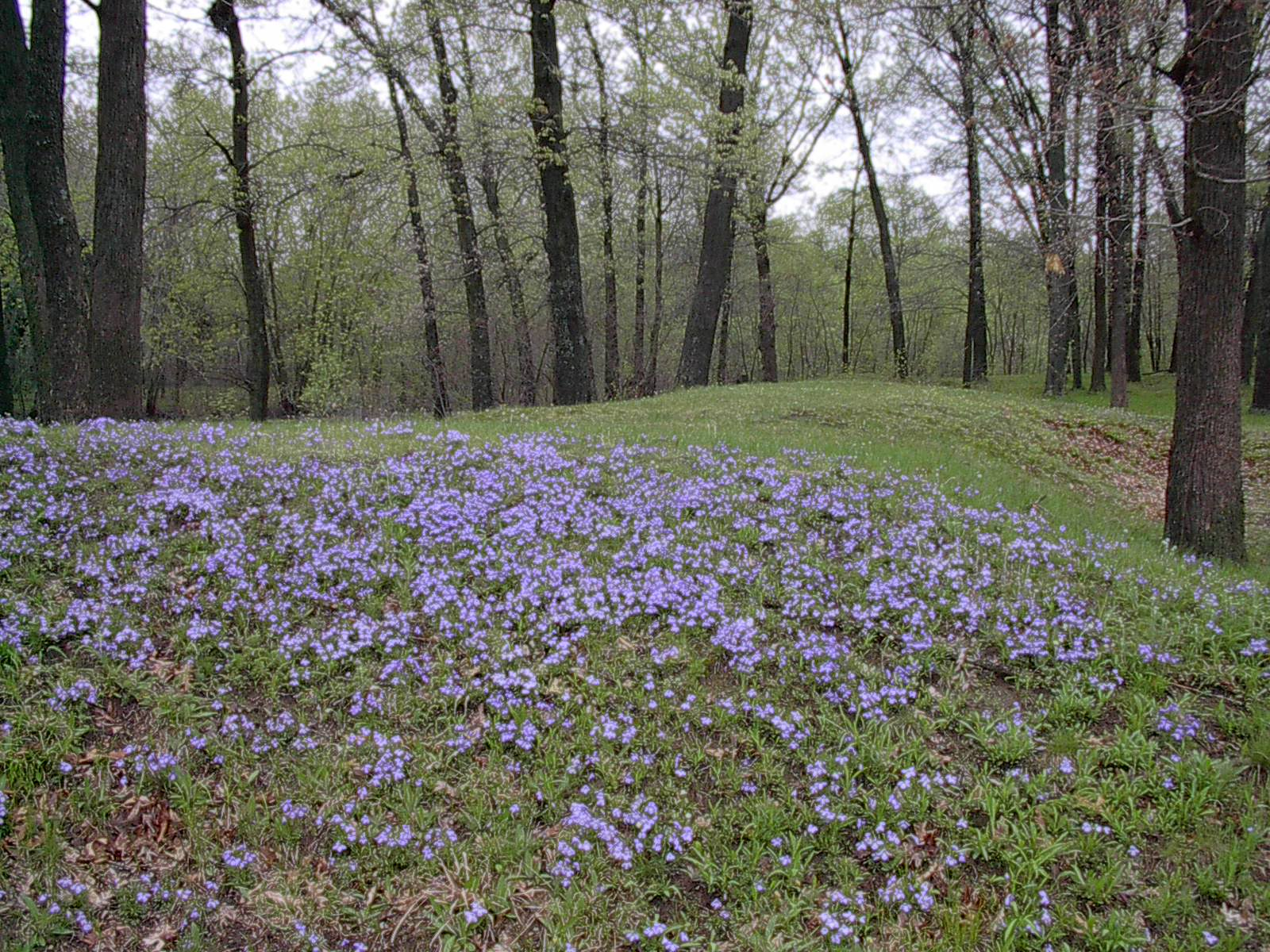
- This form is reportedly the Water Panther
- Location: Address restricted
- Nearest city: New Lisbon, Wisconsin
- Area: 2 acres (0.81 ha)
- Built: 0300
- NRHP reference No.: 78000108
- Added to NRHP: March 8, 1978

The Gee's Slough Group of Indian Mounds, located along the Lemonweir River just outside of New Lisbon, Wisconsin, is listed on the US National Register of Historic Places. The New Lisbon area was a winter gathering place for the Woodland Culture Indians who are considered the ancestors to the Ho-Chunk (Winnebago) tribe.

The mounds at New Lisbon consist of three conical mounds, two linear mounds, one chain mound, and a panther effigy mound, which some interpret as a water spirit. In the past there were at least seven more mounds, but they have been destroyed.

Conical mounds ranging from several meters to over 20 meters in diameter were first constructed in Wisconsin by Woodland tradition cultures as early as 400 BC. Conical mounds usually were constructed as receptacles for the dead and may represent family or lineage burial tombs. These mounds were built by cultures of the Early Woodland stage (500–100 BC), the Middle Woodland stage (100 BC–AD 500) and the Late Woodland stage (AD 500–AD 1300).

During the Middle Woodland stage, mound-building cultures participated in long-distance trade and exchange in order to obtain materials from as far away as the Gulf Coast of Mexico and the Great Plains. The cultures also began to experiment with horticulture by growing a variety of domestic and imported Mesoamerican plants.

During the Late Woodland stage, the preceding elaborate trade system declined. Populations subsisted on a corn, beans, and squash agriculture, supplemented with hunting and gathering in the southern part of the state and a hunting and gathering strategy to the north. Late Woodland stage mound building included the construction of effigy (animal-shaped) mounds for the burial of the dead.

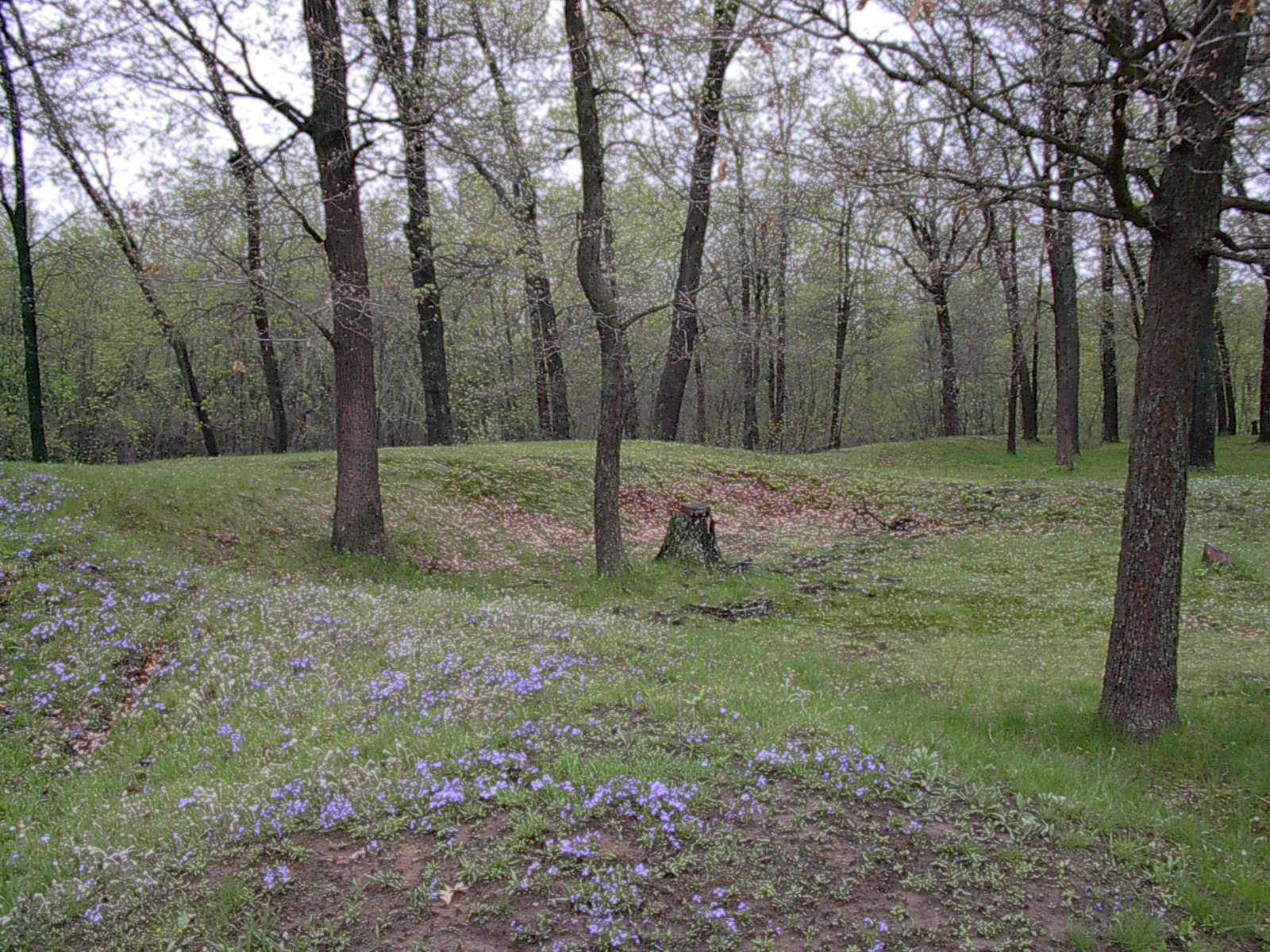
Another photo of the "Gees Slough" Effigy Mounds in New Lisbon, WI
