= Mauston, Wisconsin =

- City
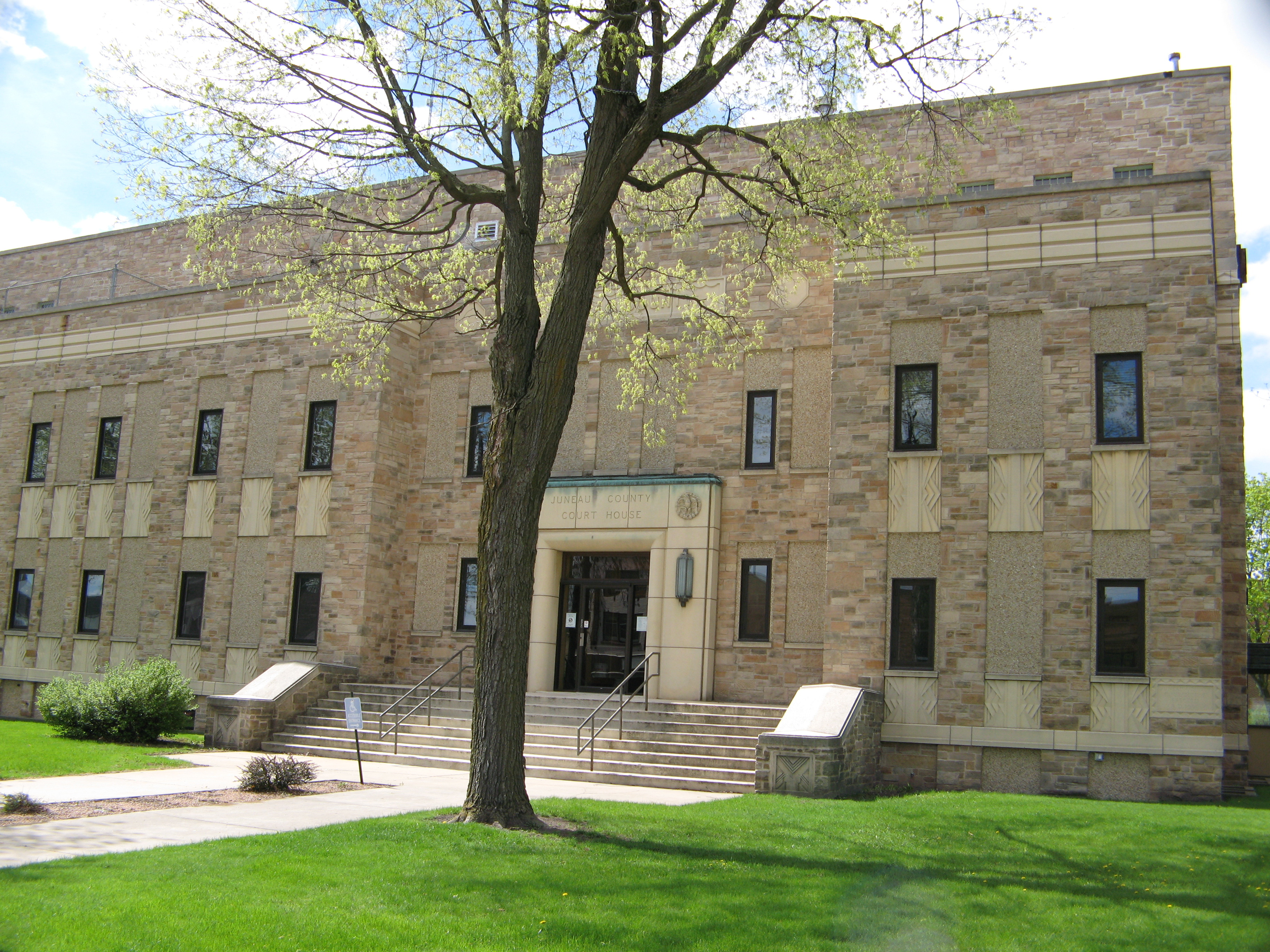
- Juneau County Courthouse

- Location of Mauston in Juneau County, Wisconsin

- Location within Wisconsin Location within the United States
- Coordinates: 43°48′N 90°5′W
- Country: United States
- State: Wisconsin
- County: Juneau

Government
  - Type: Mayor-council government
  - Mayor: Darryl Teske

Area
  - Total: 4.89 sq mi (12.67 km^{2})
  - Land: 4.47 sq mi (11.57 km^{2})
  - Water: 0.42 sq mi (1.1 km^{2})
- Elevation: 883 ft (269 m)

Population (2020)
  - Total: 4,347
  - Density: 973/sq mi (375.5/km^{2})
- Time zone: UTC-6 (Central (CST))
  - Summer (DST): UTC-5 (CDT)
- Zip Code: 53948
- Area code: 608
- FIPS code: 55-50025
- GNIS feature ID: 1569135
- Website: www.mauston.com

Mauston is a city in and the county seat of Juneau County, Wisconsin, United States. The population was 4,347 as of the 2020 census. It is approximately 70 miles northwest from the state capital, Madison.

== History ==
Mauston was founded by Milton M. Maughs. The town was originally named Maughs Town, after him. The town's beginning was based on the lumber industry of early Wisconsin. The history of Mauston is currently preserved in the Benjamin Boorman House on Union Street.

== Geography ==
Mauston is located at 43°48′N 90°5′W (43.798, -90.077). It is in the Central Standard time zone. The mean elevation is 883 feet.

According to the United States Census Bureau, the city has a total area of 4.9 square miles (12.69 km^{2}), of which 4.47 square miles (11.58 km^{2}) is land and 0.43 square miles (1.11 km^{2}) is water.

=== Climate ===
Climate data for Mauston, Wisconsin (1991–2020 normals, extremes 1905–present)
Month	Jan	Feb	Mar	Apr	May	Jun	Jul	Aug	Sep	Oct	Nov	Dec	Year
Record high °F (°C)	58 (14)	71 (22)	84 (29)	91 (33)	96 (36)	100 (38)	103 (39)	102 (39)	99 (37)	90 (32)	76 (24)	66 (19)	103 (39)
Mean maximum °F (°C)	45.6 (7.6)	51.2 (10.7)	66.6 (19.2)	78.3 (25.7)	85.3 (29.6)	89.6 (32.0)	91.6 (33.1)	90.5 (32.5)	86.6 (30.3)	79.8 (26.6)	64.3 (17.9)	50.1 (10.1)	93.7 (34.3)
Mean daily maximum °F (°C)	26.3 (−3.2)	31.1 (−0.5)	43.1 (6.2)	56.2 (13.4)	68.5 (20.3)	77.4 (25.2)	81.5 (27.5)	79.8 (26.6)	72.4 (22.4)	59.6 (15.3)	44.5 (6.9)	31.6 (−0.2)	56.0 (13.3)
Daily mean °F (°C)	17.2 (−8.2)	21.3 (−5.9)	33.2 (0.7)	45.4 (7.4)	57.5 (14.2)	66.8 (19.3)	70.9 (21.6)	68.8 (20.4)	61.0 (16.1)	48.7 (9.3)	35.8 (2.1)	23.4 (−4.8)	45.8 (7.7)
Mean daily minimum °F (°C)	8.0 (−13.3)	11.4 (−11.4)	23.2 (−4.9)	34.6 (1.4)	46.6 (8.1)	56.1 (13.4)	60.3 (15.7)	57.9 (14.4)	49.7 (9.8)	37.8 (3.2)	27.0 (−2.8)	15.3 (−9.3)	35.7 (2.1)
Mean minimum °F (°C)	−14.4 (−25.8)	−10.6 (−23.7)	0.0 (−17.8)	20.5 (−6.4)	31.7 (−0.2)	42.9 (6.1)	49.7 (9.8)	46.0 (7.8)	35.2 (1.8)	24.3 (−4.3)	9.9 (−12.3)	−6.0 (−21.1)	−18.4 (−28.0)
Record low °F (°C)	−37 (−38)	−38 (−39)	−35 (−37)	5 (−15)	18 (−8)	30 (−1)	40 (4)	33 (1)	20 (−7)	9 (−13)	−18 (−28)	−30 (−34)	−38 (−39)
Average precipitation inches (mm)	1.34 (34)	1.25 (32)	2.01 (51)	3.73 (95)	4.51 (115)	5.11 (130)	3.83 (97)	4.47 (114)	3.75 (95)	2.69 (68)	2.01 (51)	1.63 (41)	36.33 (923)
Average snowfall inches (cm)	13.1 (33)	11.0 (28)	7.1 (18)	2.8 (7.1)	0.0 (0.0)	0.0 (0.0)	0.0 (0.0)	0.0 (0.0)	0.0 (0.0)	0.2 (0.51)	2.5 (6.4)	9.9 (25)	46.6 (118.01)
Average extreme snow depth inches (cm)	9.8 (25)	11.0 (28)	8.3 (21)	1.7 (4.3)	0.0 (0.0)	0.0 (0.0)	0.0 (0.0)	0.0 (0.0)	0.0 (0.0)	0.1 (0.25)	2.2 (5.6)	6.5 (17)	13.3 (34)
Average precipitation days (≥ 0.01 in)	8.3	7.4	8.2	11.2	13.1	11.6	9.8	9.8	9.6	9.6	7.7	8.9	115.2
Average snowy days (≥ 0.1 in)	6.1	5.7	3.1	1.0	0.0	0.0	0.0	0.0	0.0	0.1	1.7	4.9	22.6
Source: NOAA

== Transportation ==
Mauston is served by the Mauston-New Lisbon Union Airport (82C). This general-aviation airport is jointly owned with New Lisbon. The closest airports with commercial service are Dane County Regional Airport and La Crosse Regional Airport, about one hour in either direction via Interstate 90.

I-90 and Interstate 94 run concurrently, with an interchange located at Wisconsin Highway 82. U.S. Route 12 and Wisconsin Highway 16 run concurrently northwest/southeast through downtown as a two-lane road almost parallel to the interstates. Wisconsin Highway 58 runs north/south through town and crosses over I-90/I-94 without an exit. WIS-82 runs east/west through town with a brief concurrency with WIS-58, then continues east to the interchange.

Mauston is served by the Canadian Pacific Kansas City Tomah Subdivision, the former Milwaukee Road main line between Chicago and Seattle.

== Demographics ==
Historical population
Census	Pop.	Note	%±
1870	952		—
1880	1,013		6.4%
1890	1,343		32.6%
1900	1,718		27.9%
1910	1,701		−1.0%
1920	1,966		15.6%
1930	2,107		7.2%
1940	2,621		24.4%
1950	3,171		21.0%
1960	3,531		11.4%
1970	3,466		−1.8%
1980	3,284		−5.3%
1990	3,439		4.7%
2000	3,740		8.8%
2010	4,423		18.3%
2020	4,347		−1.7%
U.S. Decennial Census

=== 2020 census ===
As of the census of 2020, the population was 4,347. The population density was 972.5 inhabitants per square mile (375.5/km^{2}). There were 1,955 housing units at an average density of 437.4 per square mile (168.9/km^{2}). Ethnically, the population was 3.6% Hispanic or Latino of any race. When grouping both Hispanic and non-Hispanic people together by race, the city was 89.5% White, 2.7% Black or African American, 1.2% Native American, 0.8% Asian, 1.4% from other races, and 4.5% from two or more races.

The 2020 census population of the city included 378 people incarcerated in adult correctional facilities.

According to the American Community Survey estimates for 2016-2020, the median income for a household in the city was $49,730, and the median income for a family was $63,839. Male full-time workers had a median income of $40,547 versus $35,809 for female workers. The per capita income for the city was $26,214. About 7.6% of families and 18.7% of the population were below the poverty line, including 14.5% of those under age 18 and 22% of those age 65 or over. Of the population age 25 and over, 89.2% were high school graduates or higher and 15.1% had a bachelor's degree or higher.

=== 2010 census ===
As of the census of 2010, there were 4,423 people, 1,779 households, and 985 families living in the city. The population density was 1,007.5 inhabitants per square mile (389.0/km^{2}). There were 2,006 housing units at an average density of 456.9 per square mile (176.4/km^{2}). The racial makeup of the city was 92.8% White, 2.6% African American, 1.2% Native American, 0.7% Asian, 0.7% from other races, and 2% from two or more races. Hispanic or Latino people of any race were 3.5% of the population.

There were 1,779 households, of which 29.3% had children under the age of 18 living with them, 35.9% were married couples living together, 13.7% had a female householder with no husband present, 5.8% had a male householder with no wife present, and 44.6% were non-families. 37.3% of all households were made up of individuals, and 17.4% had someone living alone who was 65 years of age or older. The average household size was 2.25 and the average family size was 2.94.

The median age in the city was 39.3 years. 22.3% of residents were under the age of 18; 8.7% were between the ages of 18 and 24; 26.6% were from 25 to 44; 25.4% were from 45 to 64; and 17.1% were 65 years of age or older. The gender makeup of the city was 50.1% male and 49.9% female.

=== 2000 census ===
As of the census of 2000, there were 3,740 people, 1,585 households, and 963 families living in the city. The population density was 1,022.6 people per square mile (394.5/km^{2}). There were 1,729 housing units at an average density of 472.8 per square mile (182.4/km^{2}). The racial makeup of the city was 96.28% White, 0.67% African American, 0.35% Native American, 1.18% Asian, 0.48% from other races, and 1.04% from two or more races. Hispanic or Latino people of any race were 2.11% of the population.

There were 1,585 households, out of which 29.1% had children under the age of 18 living with them, 45% were married couples living together, 11.8% had a female householder with no husband present, and 39.2% were non-families. 33.5% of all households were made up of individuals, and 18.7% had someone living alone who was 65 years of age or older. The average household size was 2.28 and the average family size was 2.89.

In the city, the population was spread out, with 24.2% under the age of 18, 8.6% from 18 to 24, 27.1% from 25 to 44, 19.2% from 45 to 64, and 20.9% who were 65 years of age or older. The median age was 38 years. For every 100 females, there were 88.1 males. For every 100 females age 18 and over, there were 81.4 males.

== Education ==
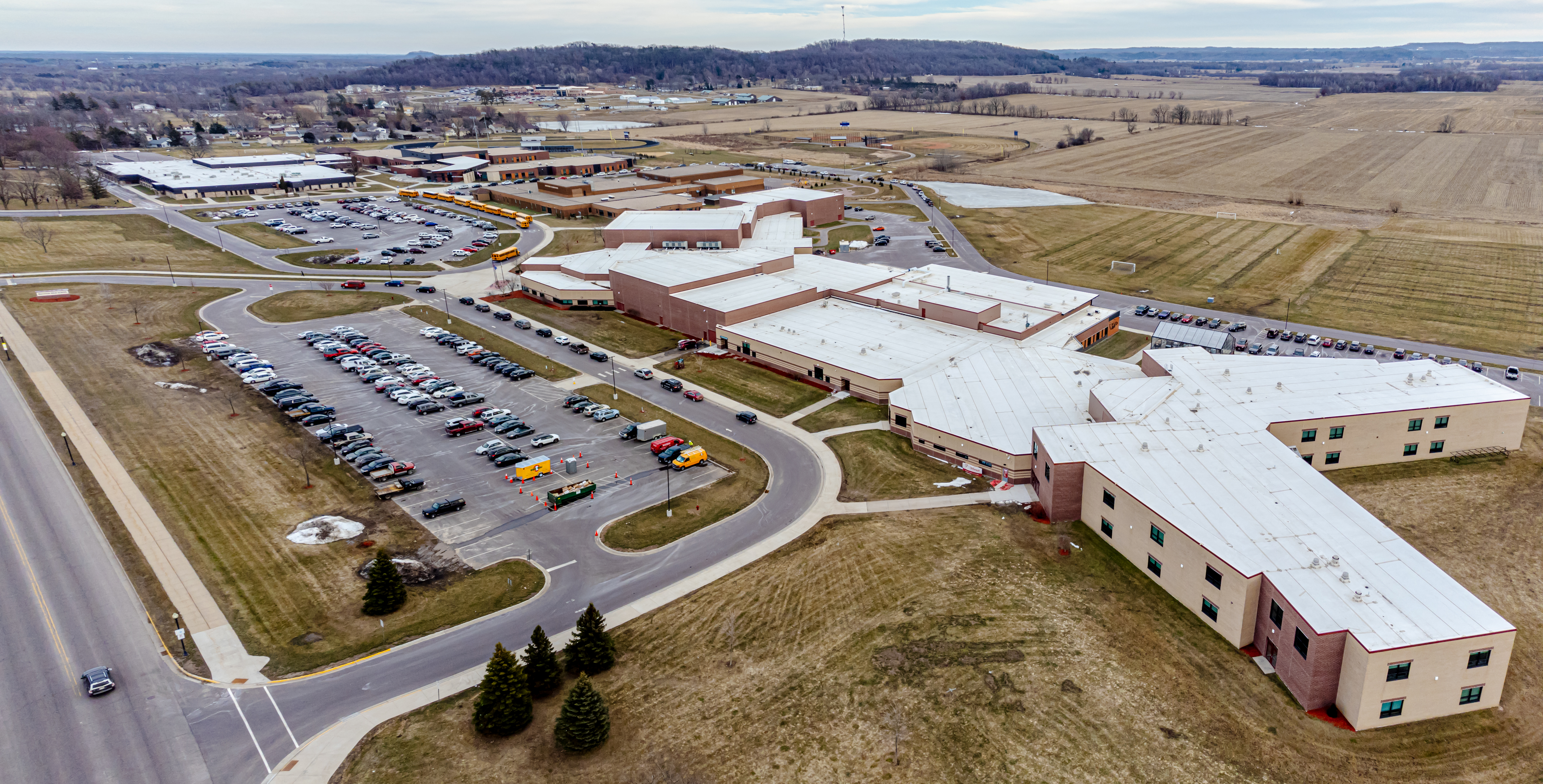
Mauston schools on the west side of town on Wis-82

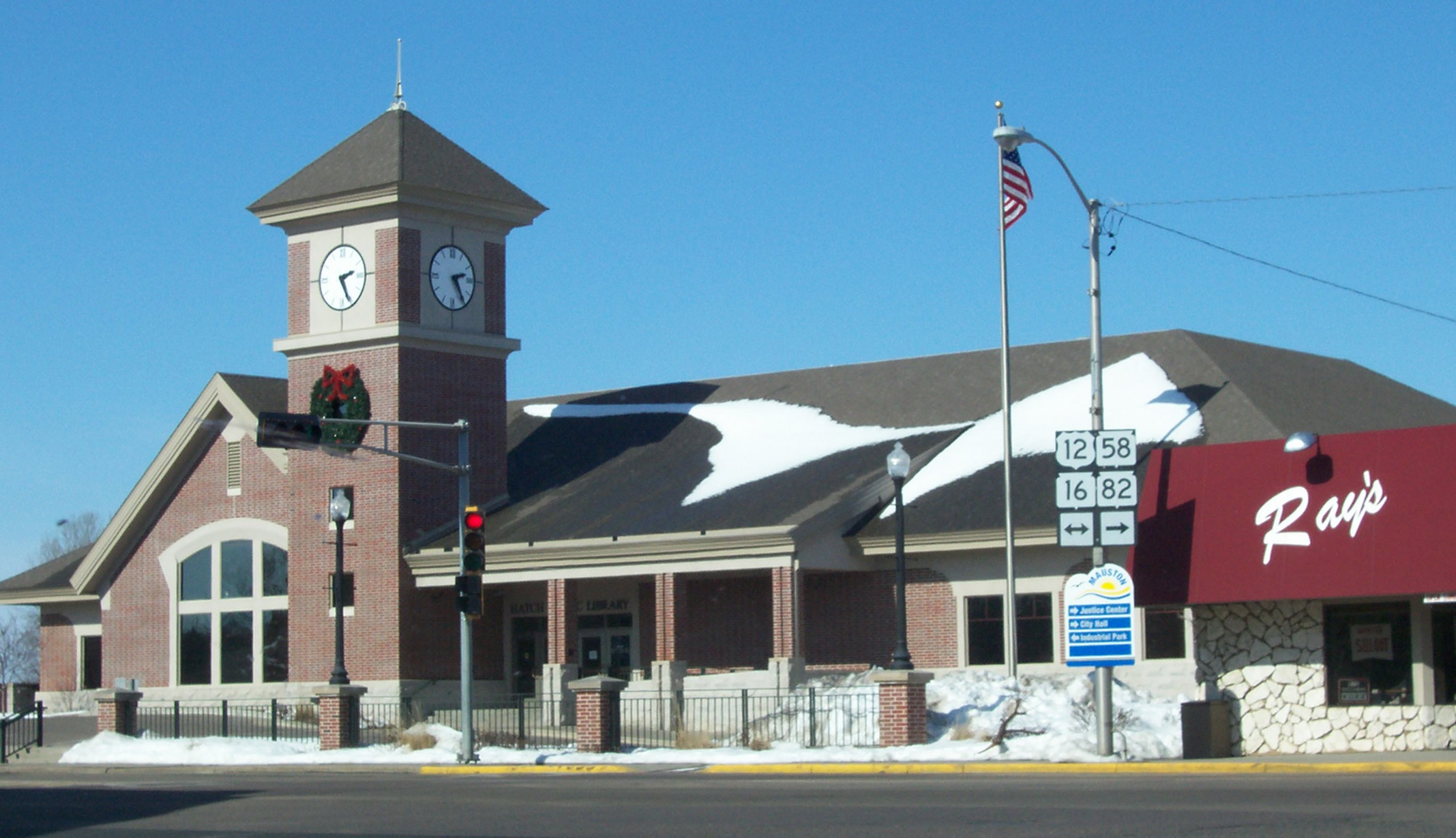
Mauston library

The city and surrounding area are served by the Mauston Area School District, which provides kindergarten through senior high education. District schools include West Side Elementary (grades 4K-2), Grayside Elementary (grades 3–5), Olson Middle School (which is housed in the former high school and serves grades 6, 7, and 8), and Mauston High School, which opened its doors in 2001. Lyndon Station Elementary School, which houses grades K-5, is located in nearby Lyndon Station.

A pre-K through 8th grade Catholic parochial school has been operated by St. Patrick Parish since 1895. The parish also operated St. Patrick High School from 1933 to 1951, and Madonna High School from 1951 to 1966. This school holds about 200 students from all counties of Southern Wisconsin.

Mauston is also home to a campus of Western Technical College.

== Media ==
- WRJC-FM, radio
- Juneau County Star-Times, newspaper

Mauston is a part of the Madison Television Market and is also served by radio stations from the greater Wisconsin Dells-Baraboo area.

== Notable people ==
- John T. Benson, Superintendent of Public Instruction of Wisconsin
- Kelly Bires, NASCAR driver, also won two state wrestling championships in Wisconsin
- Thomas John Curran, United States Federal Court judge
- Kenneth Philip Grubb. United States Federal Court judge
- Frank H. Hanson, Wisconsin State Senator and Representative
- Leo Kieffer, Maine State Senator
- Bill Lobenstein, NFL player
- Orland Steen Loomis, one-time governor-elect of Wisconsin
- John Patterson, Medal of Honor recipient
- Jessica Powers, Roman Catholic nun and writer
- Clinton G. Price, Wisconsin State Representative and lawyer
- Edwin M. Truell, Medal of Honor recipient
- Florence E. Ward, educator, USDA official

== Gallery ==
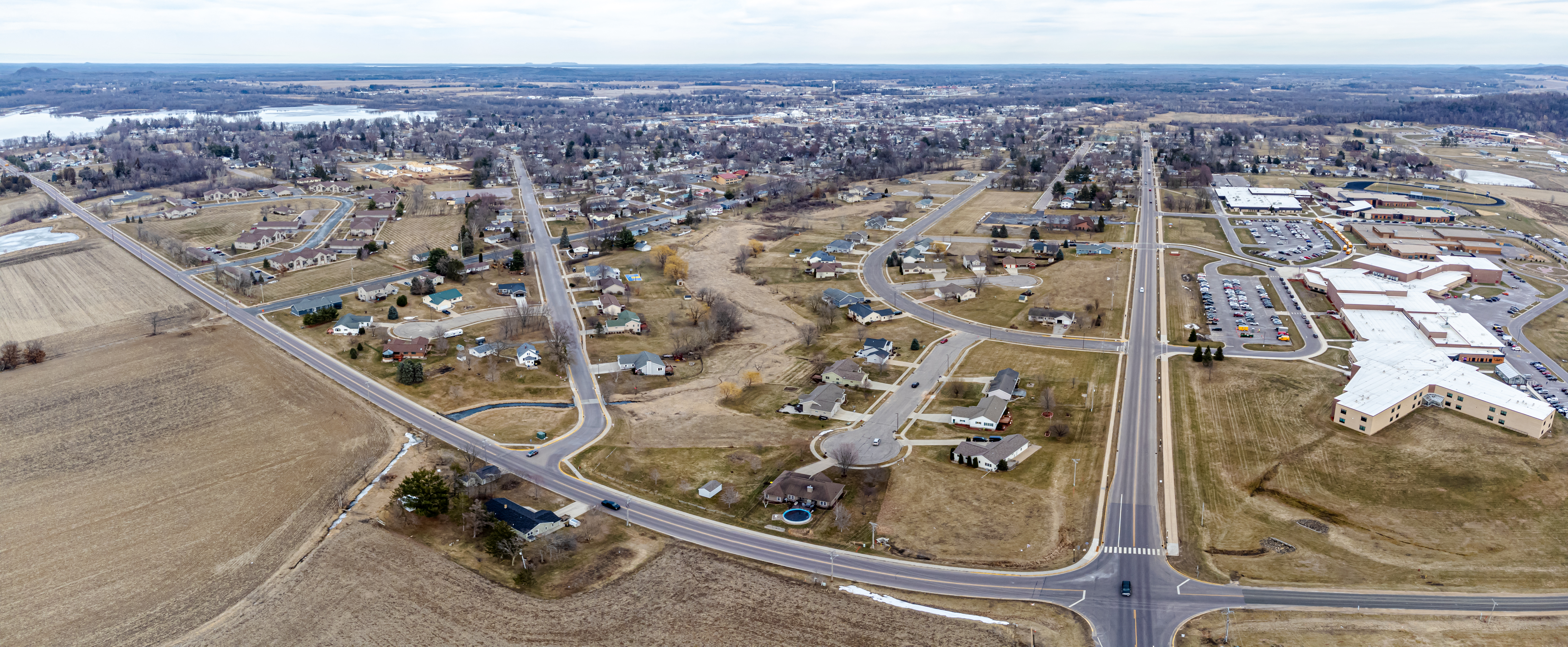
Wis-82 entering on the west side

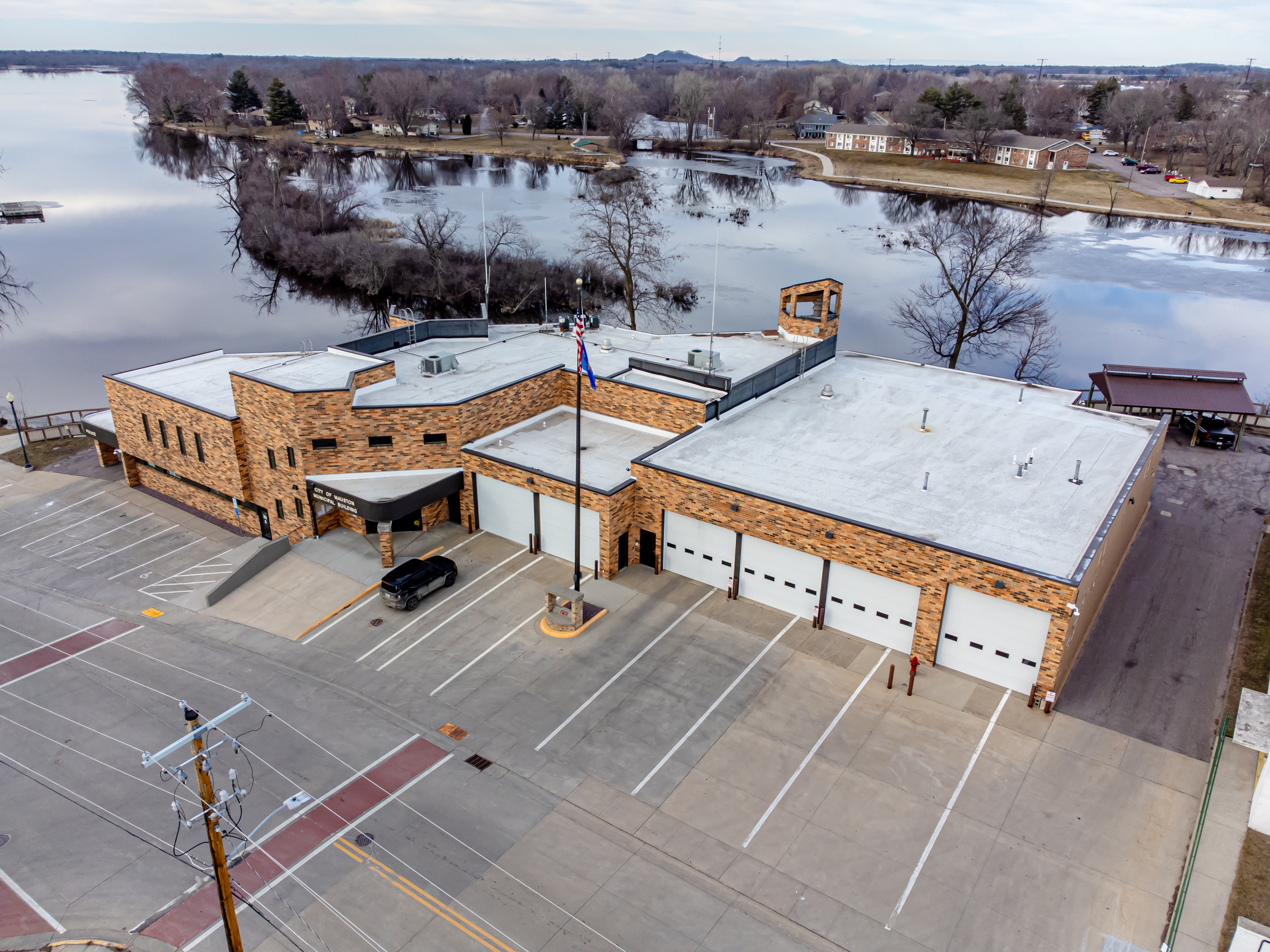
City of Mauston municipal building

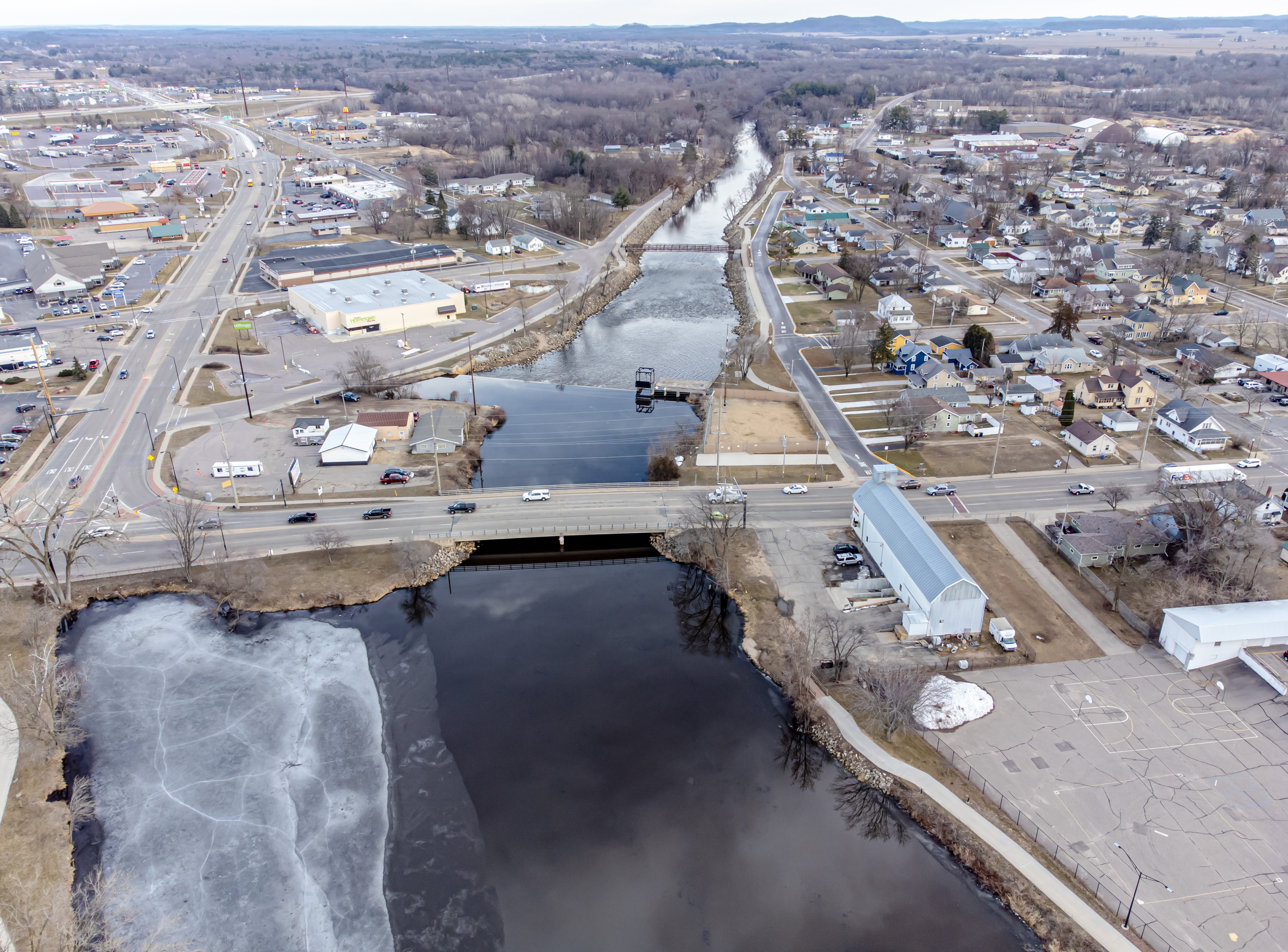
Lemonweir River

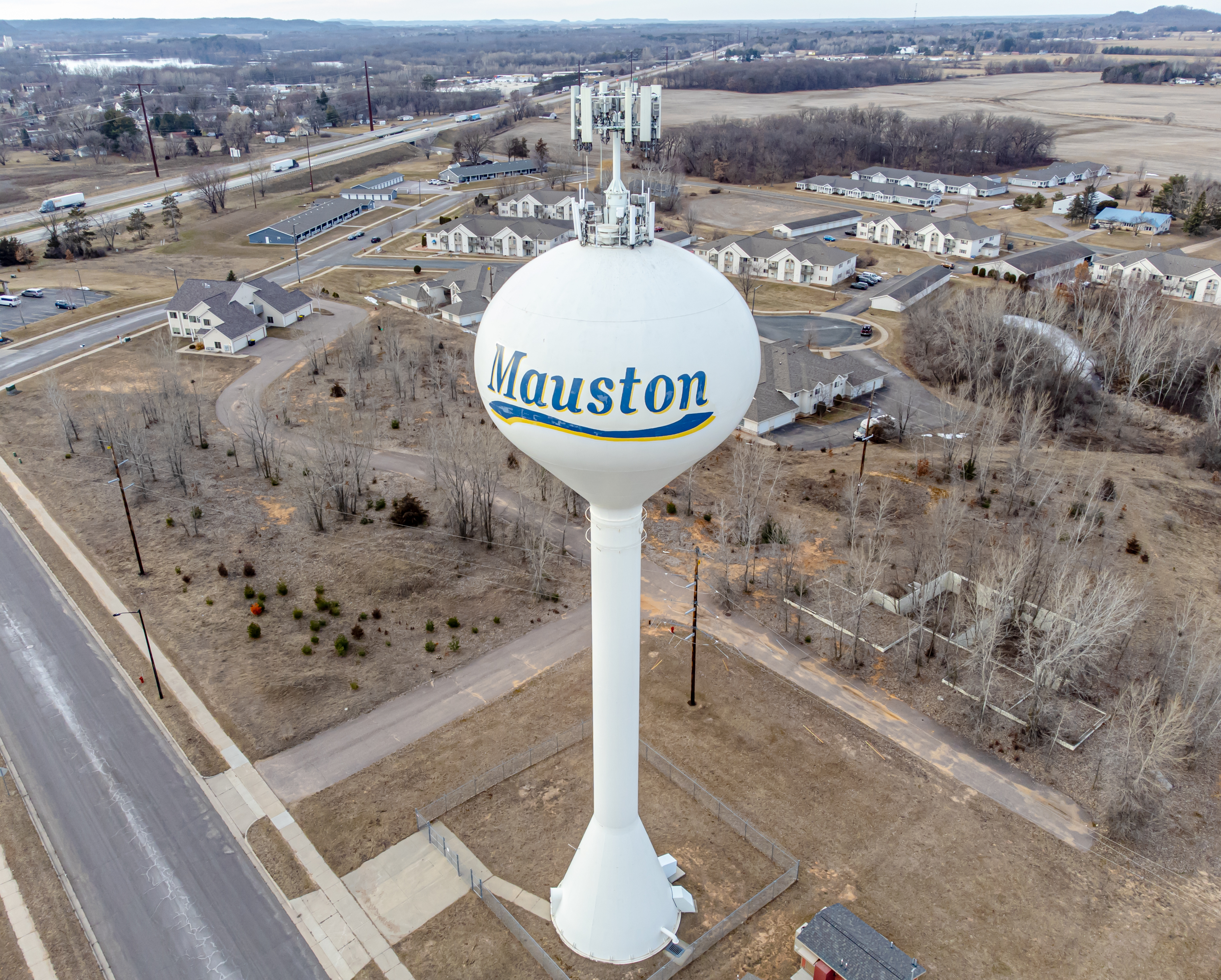
Mauston water tower with cellular tower on top
