= Juneau County Courthouse =

- U.S. National Register of Historic Places
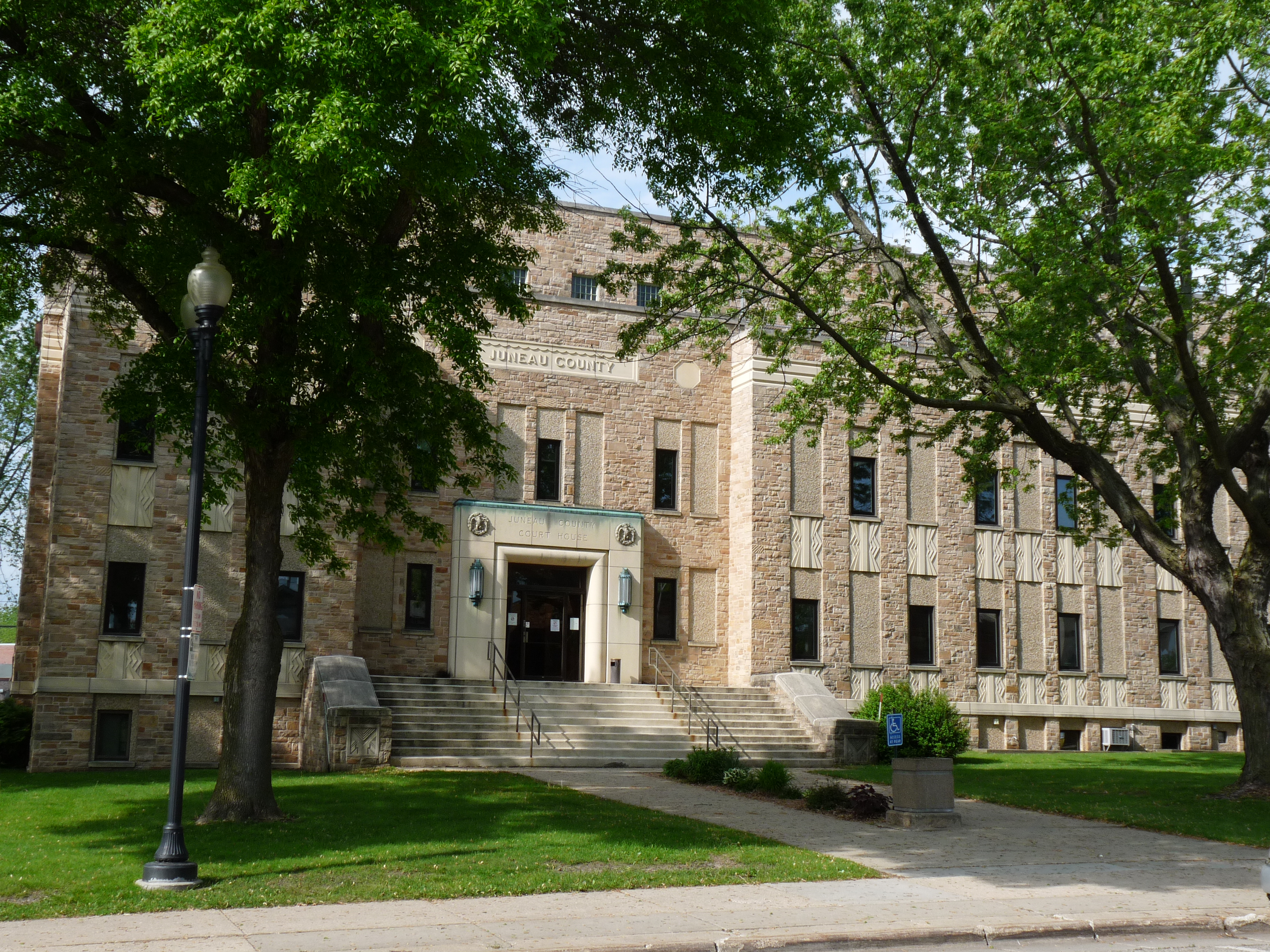

- Location within Wisconsin Location within the United States
- Interactive map showing the location of Juneau County Courthouse
- Location: 220 E. State St., Mauston, Wisconsin in Juneau County
- Coordinates: 43.796389°N 90.075278°W
- Area: 1.5 acres (0.61 ha)
- Built: 1938-39; 1939-1941
- Architect: Hougen & Henderson
- Architectural style: Moderne
- MPS: County Courthouses of Wisconsin TR
- NRHP reference No.: 82001846
- Added to NRHP: November 4, 1982

The Juneau County Courthouse, located at 220 E. State St. in Mauston, Wisconsin, was built with Works Project Administration assistance.

It was listed on the National Register of Historic Places in 1982. It was designed in Moderne style by architects Hougen & Henderson.

A foundation stone indicates the year 1939; it was completed in 1941. It is a three-story building built on a raised basement, with setbacks as it rises, and is 164 by 70 feet (50 m × 21 m)in plan at its base.

It was built in two stages: first an "addition" started in 1938 to a pre-existing courthouse, then a second unit built over the razed pre-existing building.

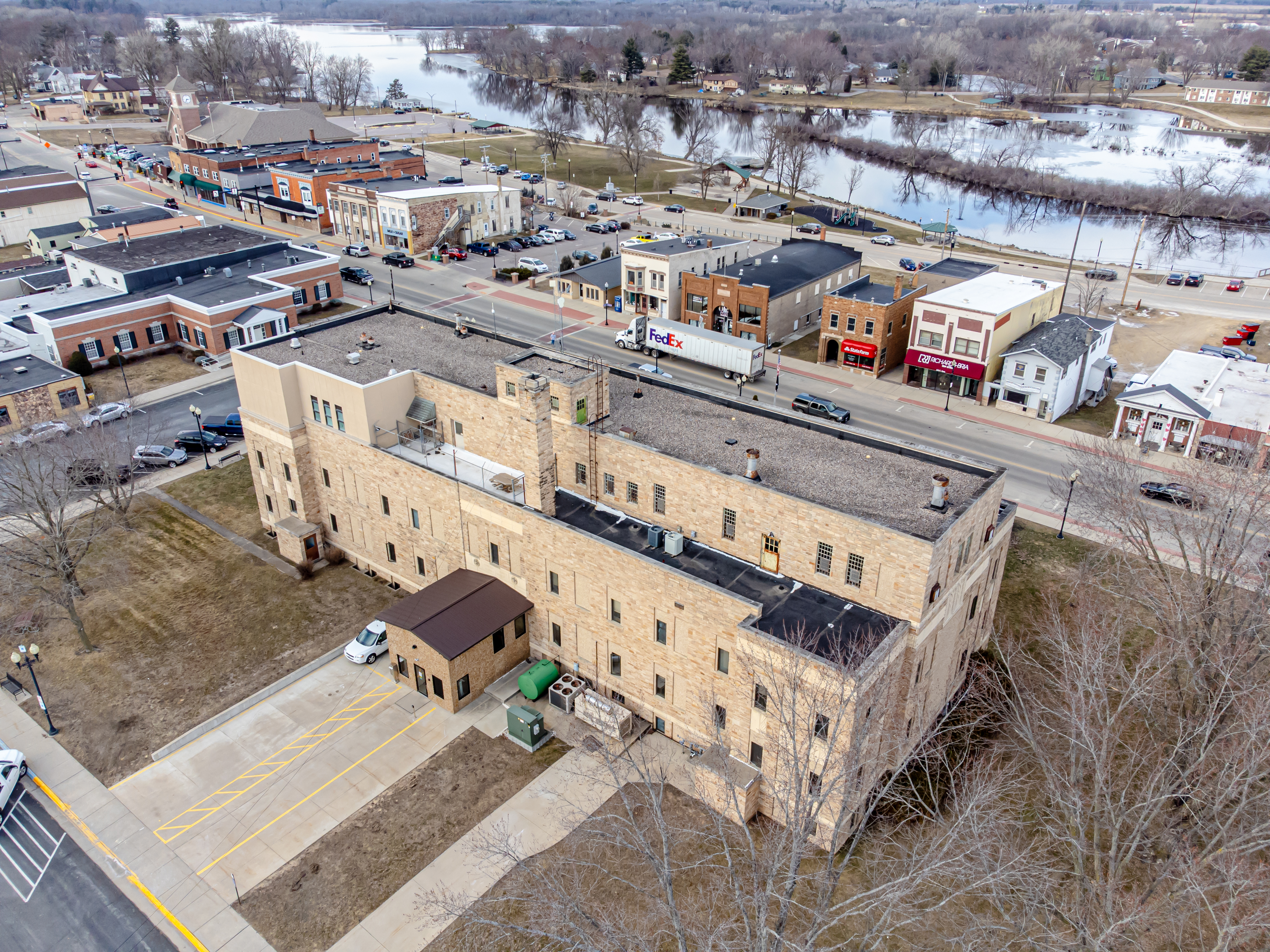
Juneau County building back side
