= Henry and Barbara Bierbauer House =

Historic house in Wisconsin, United States

- U.S. National Register of Historic Places
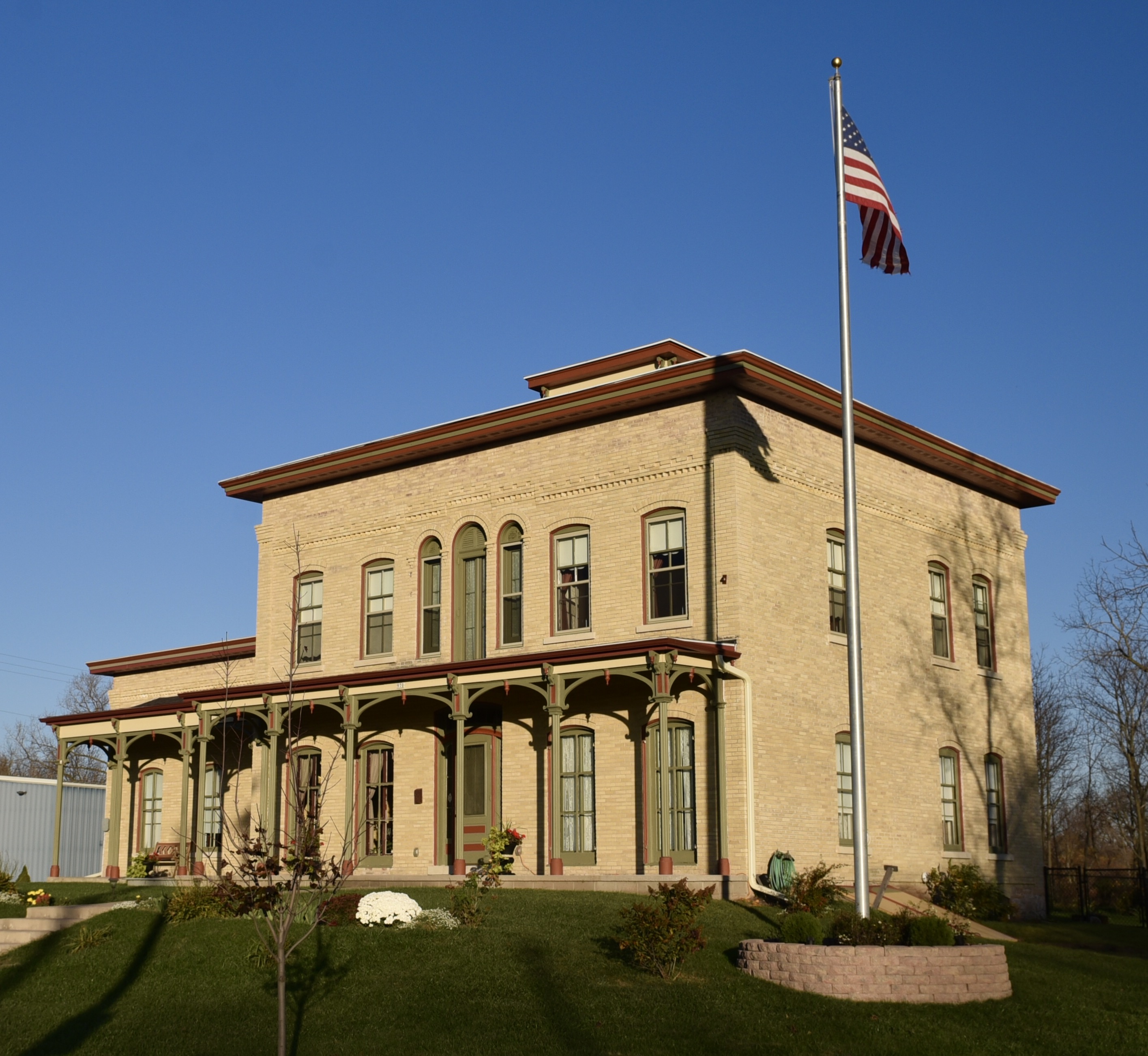
- Henry and Barbara Bierbauer House
- Location: 970 S. Monroe St. New Lisbon, Wisconsin
- Coordinates: 43.8697°N 90.16613°W
- Built: 1869
- Architectural style: Italianate
- NRHP reference No.: 16000379
- Added to NRHP: June 14, 2016

The Henry and Barbara Bierbauer House is located in New Lisbon, Wisconsin.

== History ==
The Bierbauers were immigrants from Bavaria. Henry founded a brewery and served as a local politician, eventually becoming Mayor of New Lisbon. The house remained in the Bierbauer family until 1947. During the 1950s and 1960s, it was used as a nursing home. Beginning in 2011, it underwent an extensive restoration.

The house was added to the State and the National Register of Historic Places in 2016.
