= Lemonweir River =

River in Wisconsin, U.S.

Coordinates: 43°45′46″N 89°51′01″W

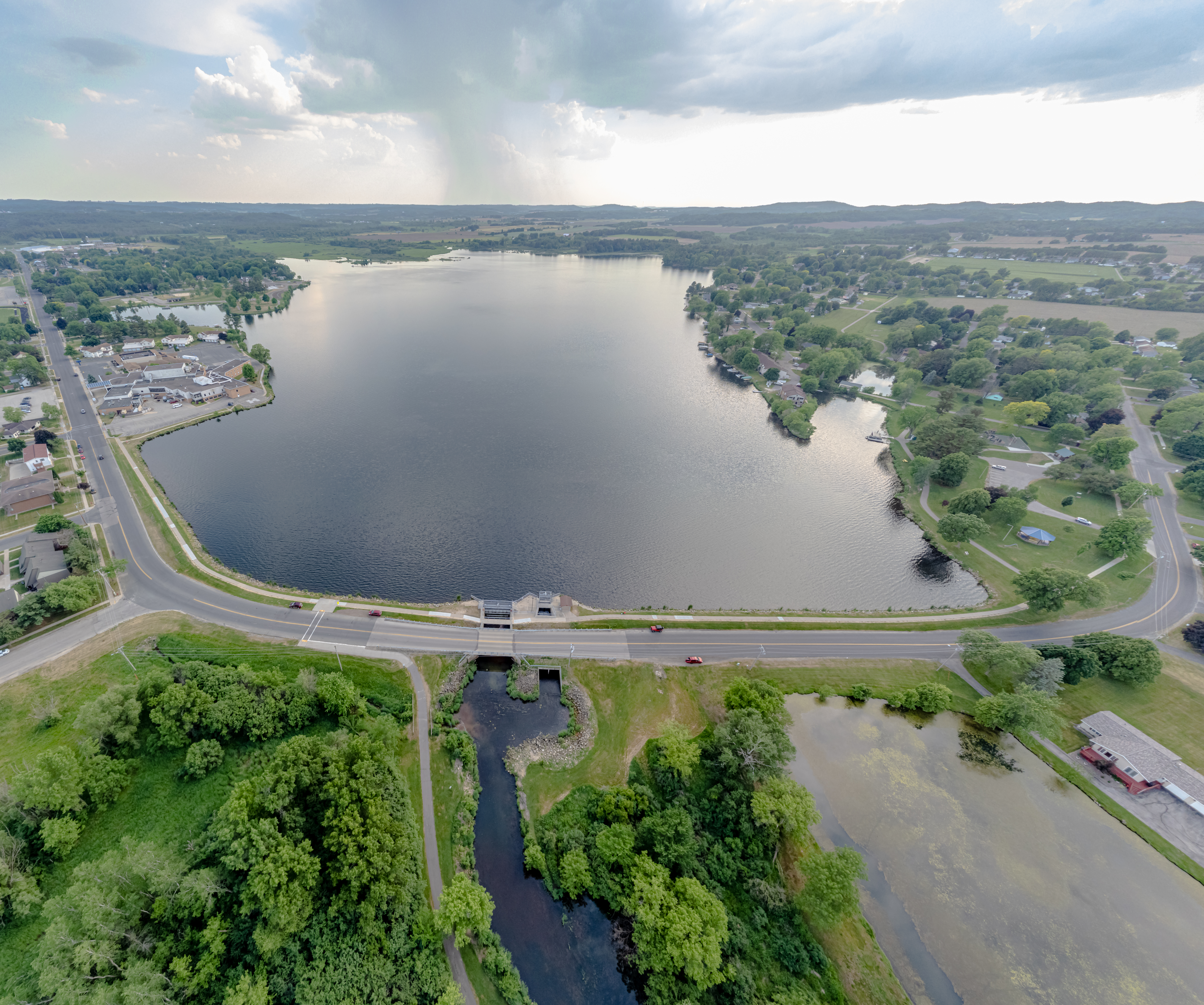
Lake Tomah and Lemonweir River at the bottom

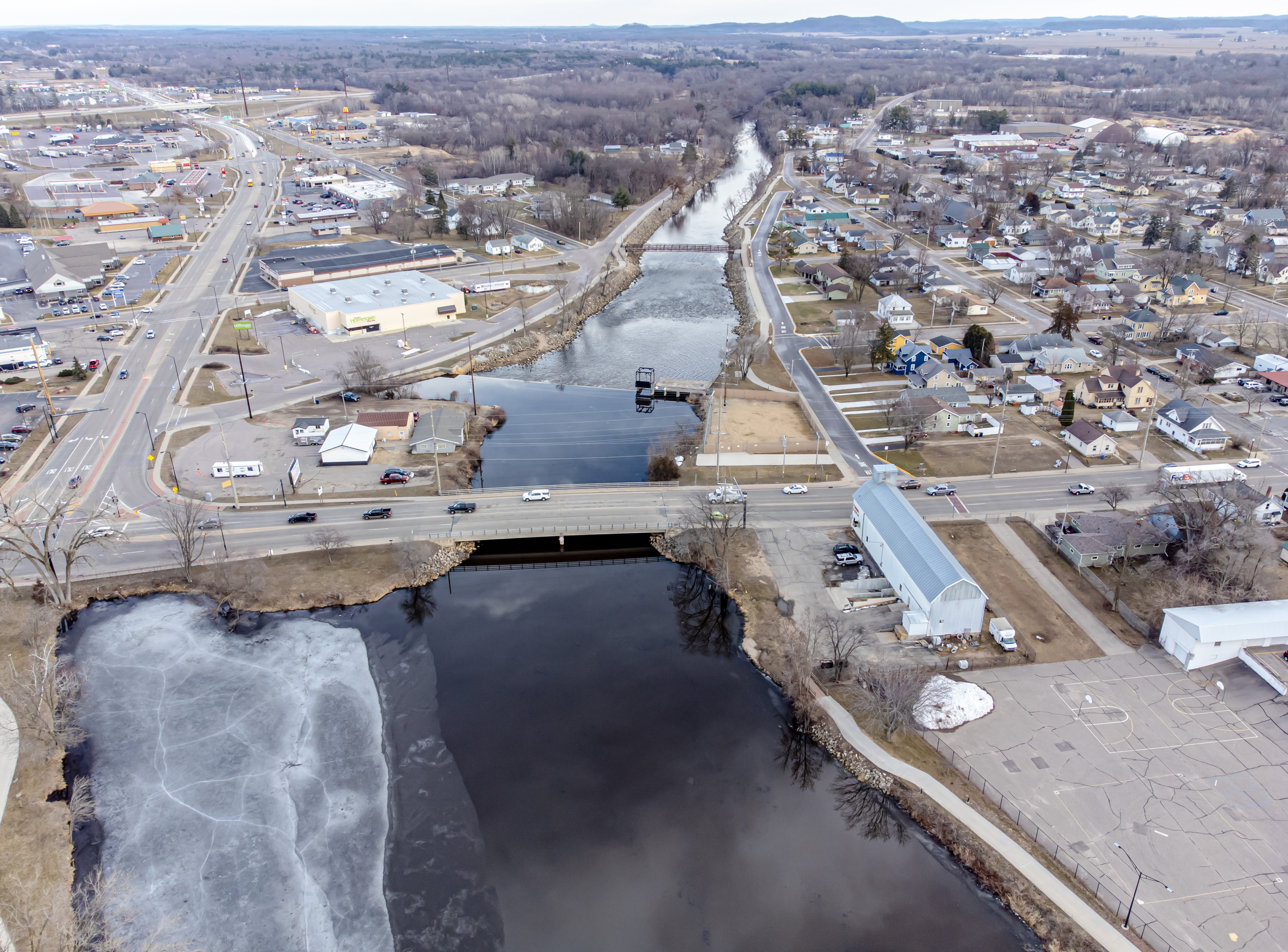
Lemonweir River in Mauston, Wisconsin

The Lemonweir River is a river in the U.S. state of Wisconsin.

It is a tributary of the Wisconsin River as the Lemonweir River originates near Tomah in Monroe County and flows into Juneau County through New Lisbon and Mauston before converging into the Wisconsin River. The Menominee name of the river is Manōnaeh-Sipiah, meaning "red or yellow earth, clay or chalk-like river".
