= Seven Mile Creek, Wisconsin =

- Town
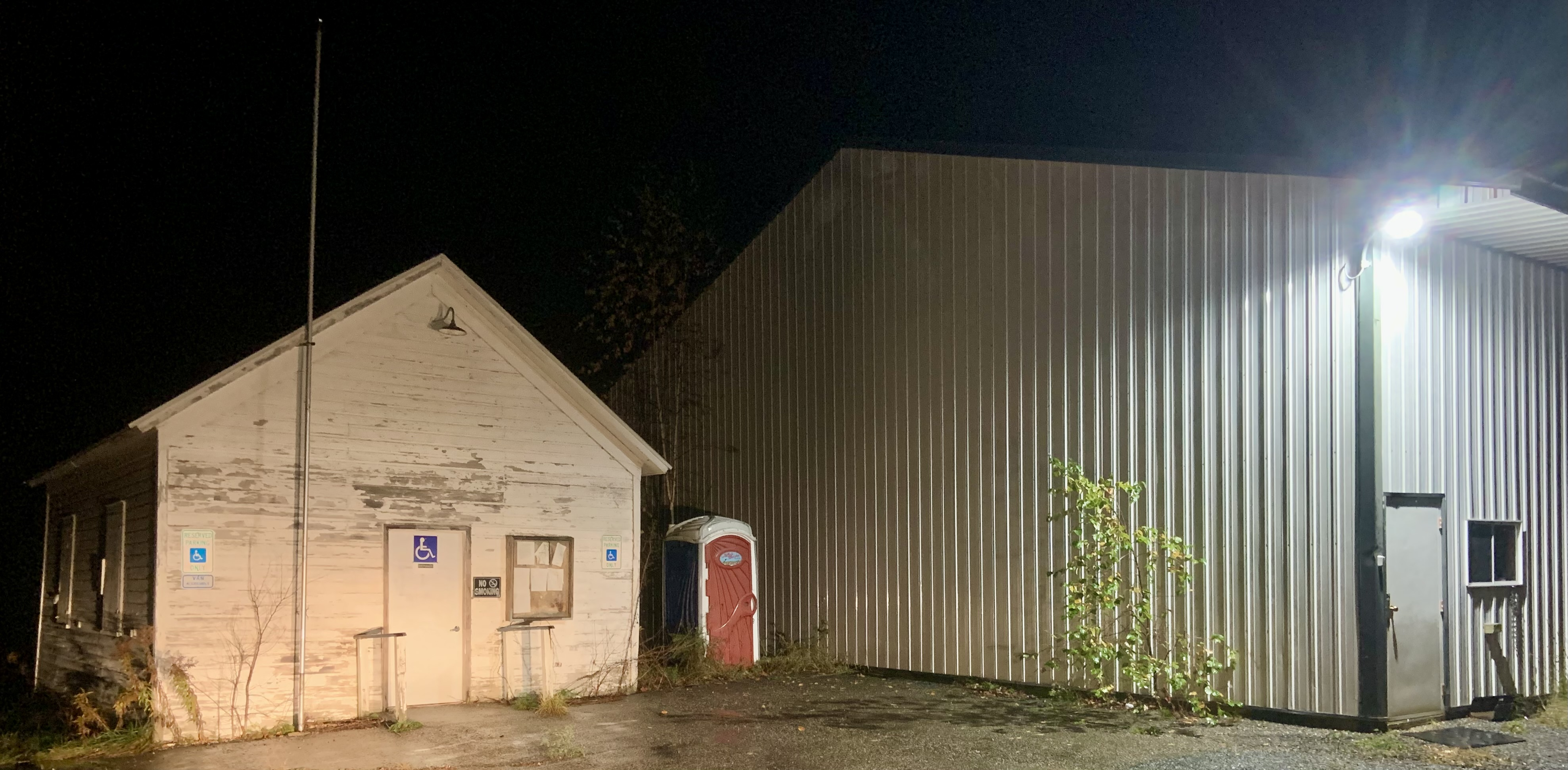
- Town hall

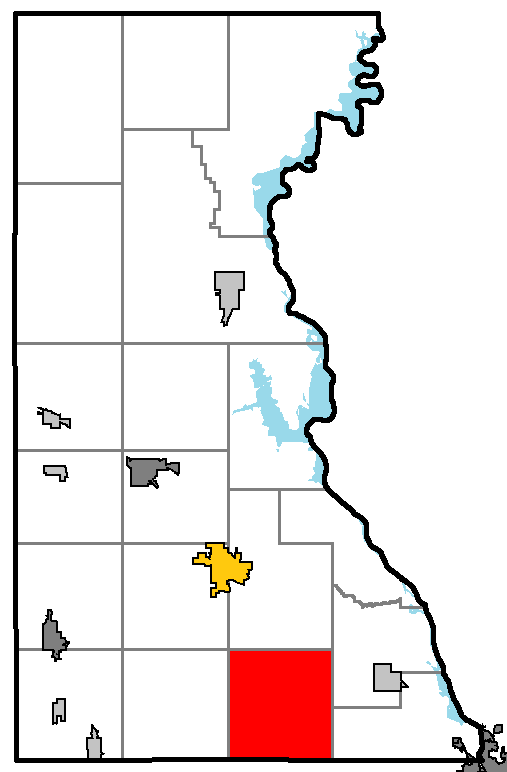
- Location of Seven Mile Creek, Juneau County

- Location of Juneau County, Wisconsin
- Coordinates: 43°40′58″N 90°1′2″W
- Country: United States
- State: Wisconsin
- County: Juneau

Area
  - Total: 36.4 sq mi (94.2 km^{2})
  - Land: 36.4 sq mi (94.2 km^{2})
  - Water: 0 sq mi (0.0 km^{2})
- Elevation: 1,080 ft (330 m)

Population (2020)
  - Total: 348
  - Density: 9.57/sq mi (3.69/km^{2})
- Time zone: UTC-6 (Central (CST))
  - Summer (DST): UTC-5 (CDT)
- Area code: 608
- FIPS code: 55-72625
- GNIS feature ID: 1584126

Seven Mile Creek is a town in Juneau County, Wisconsin, United States. The population was 348 at the 2020 census.

== Geography ==
According to the United States Census Bureau, the town has a total area of 36.4 square miles (94.2 km^{2}), all land.

== Demographics ==
As of the census of 2000, there were 369 people, 136 households, and 99 families residing in the town. The population density was 10.1 people per square mile (3.9/km^{2}). There were 168 housing units at an average density of 4.6 per square mile (1.8/km^{2}). The racial makeup of the town was 98.10% White, 1.08% African American and 0.81% Native American. Hispanic or Latino of any race were 0.27% of the population.

There were 136 households, out of which 31.6% had children under the age of 18 living with them, 57.4% were married couples living together, 5.9% had a female householder with no husband present, and 27.2% were non-families. 19.1% of all households were made up of individuals, and 8.8% had someone living alone who was 65 years of age or older. The average household size was 2.71 and the average family size was 3.06.

In the town, the population was spread out, with 27.6% under the age of 18, 6.2% from 18 to 24, 30.1% from 25 to 44, 23.6% from 45 to 64, and 12.5% who were 65 years of age or older. The median age was 38 years. For every 100 females, there were 109.7 males. For every 100 females age 18 and over, there were 100.8 males.

The median income for a household in the town was $36,731, and the median income for a family was $42,083. Males had a median income of $30,625 versus $19,375 for females. The per capita income for the town was $16,939. About 17.6% of families and 16.0% of the population were below the poverty line, including 14.1% of those under age 18 and 10.0% of those age 65 or over.
