= Armenia, Wisconsin =

- Town
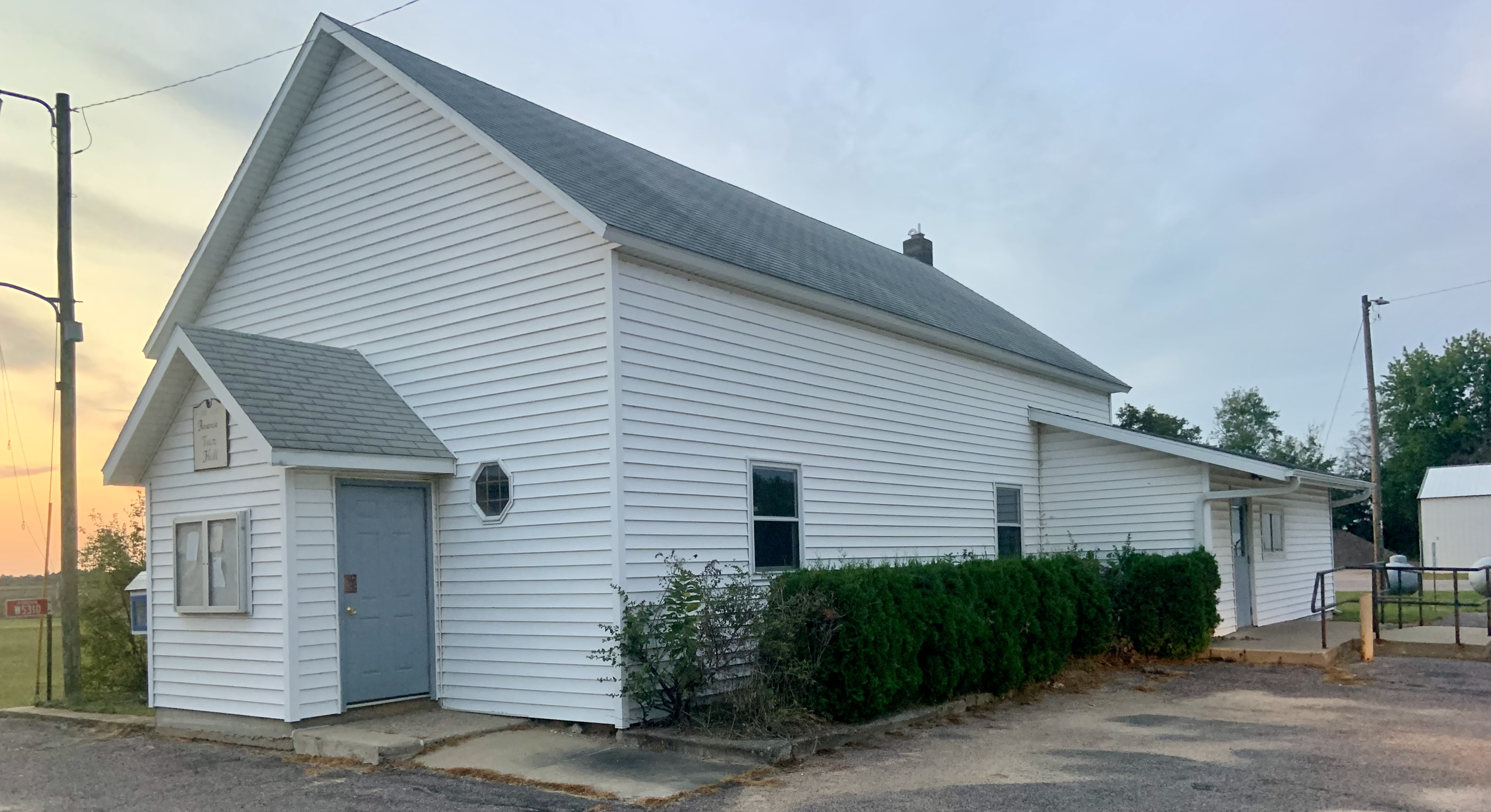
- Town hall

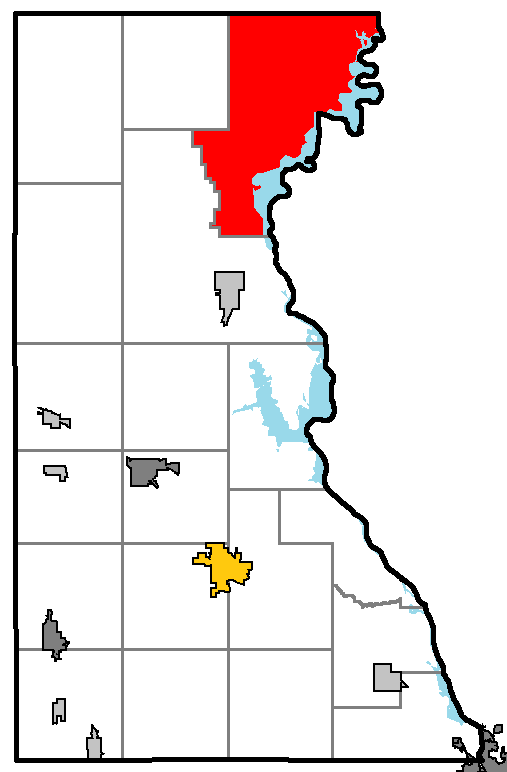
- Location of Armenia, Juneau County

- Location of Juneau County, Wisconsin
- Coordinates: 44°10′12″N 90°1′0″W
- Country: United States
- State: Wisconsin
- County: Juneau

Area
  - Total: 77.7 sq mi (201.2 km^{2})
  - Land: 66.0 sq mi (170.9 km^{2})
  - Water: 11.7 sq mi (30.3 km^{2})
- Elevation: 945 ft (288 m)

Population (2020)
  - Total: 705
  - Density: 10.7/sq mi (4.13/km^{2})
- Time zone: UTC-6 (Central (CST))
  - Summer (DST): UTC-5 (CDT)
- Area code: 608
- FIPS code: 55-02850
- GNIS feature ID: 1582715
- Website: https://townofarmenia.com/

Armenia is a town in Juneau County, Wisconsin, United States. The population was 705 at the 2020 census. The unincorporated community of New Miner is located in the town.

== Geography ==
According to the United States Census Bureau, the town has a total area of 77.7 square miles (201.2 km^{2}), of which, 66 square miles (170.9 km^{2}) is land and 11.7 square miles (30.3 km^{2}) (15.05%) is water.

== Demographics ==
As of the census of 2000, there were 707 people, 267 households, and 190 families residing in the town. The population density was 10.7 people per square mile (4.1/km^{2}). There were 448 housing units at an average density of 6.8 per square mile (2.6/km^{2}). The racial makeup of the town was 90.1% White, 0.14% African American, 0.71% Native American, 0.14% Pacific Islander, 7.92% from other races, and 0.99% from two or more races. Hispanic or Latino people of any race were 9.34% of the population.

There were 267 households, out of which 28.5% had children under the age of 18 living with them, 56.9% were married couples living together, 8.6% had a female householder with no husband present, and 28.5% were non-families. 23.6% of all households were made up of individuals, and 9% had someone living alone who was 65 years of age or older. The average household size was 2.61 and the average family size was 3.08.

In the town, the population was spread out, with 26.3% under the age of 18, 6.4% from 18 to 24, 28.6% from 25 to 44, 25.2% from 45 to 64, and 13.6% who were 65 years of age or older. The median age was 38 years. For every 100 females, there were 125.2 males. For every 100 females age 18 and over, there were 118 males.

The median income for a household in the town was $35,568, and the median income for a family was $39,063. Males had a median income of $27,750 versus $22,500 for females. The per capita income for the town was $19,539. About 7.1% of families and 11.2% of the population were below the poverty line, including 3.1% of those under age 18 and 22.8% of those age 65 or over.

== See also ==
- List of places named after Armenia
