= Juneau County, Wisconsin =

County in Wisconsin, United States

- County
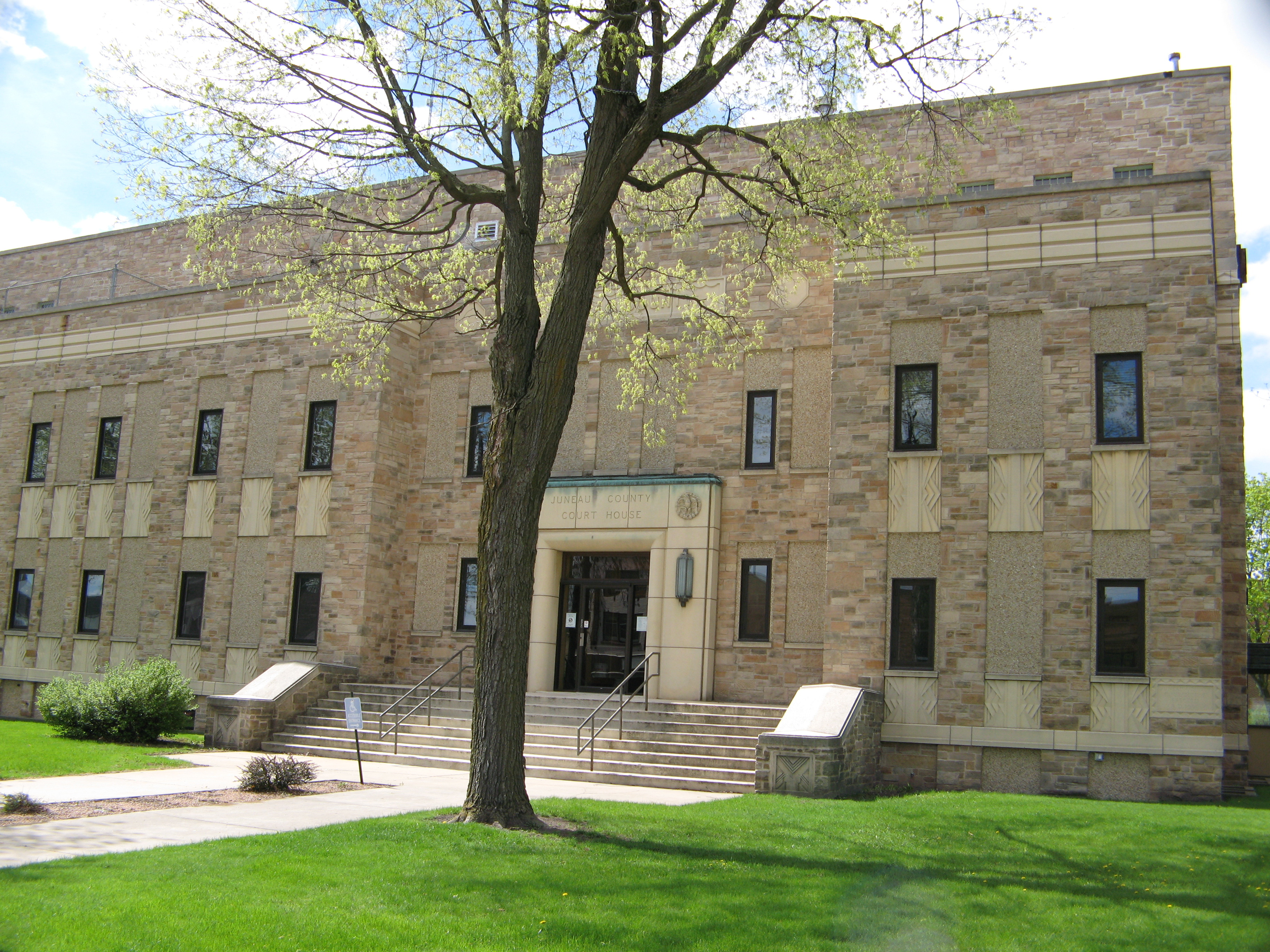
- Juneau County Courthouse

- Location within the U.S. state of Wisconsin
- Coordinates: 43.92°N 90.11°W
- Country: United States
- State: Wisconsin
- Founded: 1857
- Named for: Solomon Juneau
- Seat: Mauston
- Largest city: Mauston

Area
  - Total: 804 sq mi (2,080 km^{2})
  - Land: 767 sq mi (1,990 km^{2})
  - Water: 37 sq mi (96 km^{2}) 4.6%

Population (2020)
  - Total: 26,718
  - Estimate (2025): 26,649 ▼
  - Density: 34.8/sq mi (13.4/km^{2})
- Time zone: UTC−6 (Central)
  - Summer (DST): UTC−5 (CDT)
- Congressional districts: 3rd, 7th
- Website: www.co.juneau.wi.gov

Juneau County is a county located in the U.S. state of Wisconsin. As of the 2020 census, the population was 26,718. Its county seat is Mauston.

== History ==
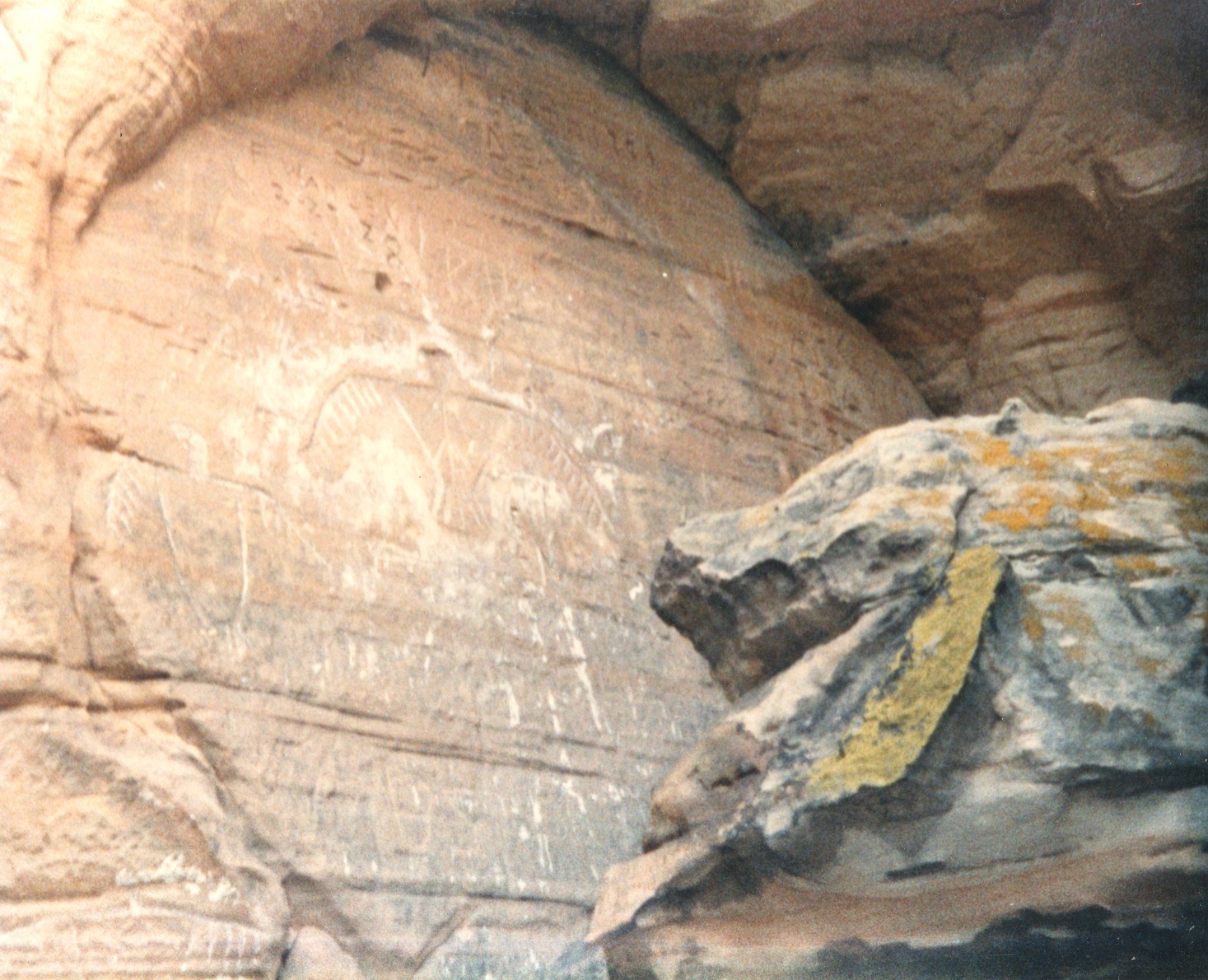
Thunderbird petroglyph at Twin Bluff

Before white settlement, before loggers and explorers, the area that is now Juneau County was the home of Native Americans who left behind artifacts like the thunderbirds etched on the wall at Twin Bluffs and the Gee's Slough mounds outside New Lisbon.

Juneau County was established in 1857 when the Wisconsin Legislature passed legislation separating lands west of the Wisconsin River from what was then Adams County. After a contest with neighboring New Lisbon, the county seat was established in Maugh's Town, which is known today as Mauston. The county was named after Solomon Juneau, a founder of Milwaukee.

In the 1970s, county officials had indicated their interest, and submitted a request to Wisconsin Power and Light Company, to build a nuclear power plant on Petenwell Lake.

== Geography ==
According to the U.S. Census Bureau, the county has a total area of 804 square miles (2,080 km^{2}), of which 767 square miles (1,990 km^{2}) is land and 37 square miles (96 km^{2}) (4.6%) is water.

=== Major highways ===
- Interstate 90
- Interstate 94
- U.S. Highway 12
- Highway 16 (Wisconsin)
- Highway 21 (Wisconsin)
- Highway 33 (Wisconsin)
- Highway 58 (Wisconsin)
- Highway 71 (Wisconsin)
- Highway 80 (Wisconsin)
- Highway 82 (Wisconsin)
- Highway 173 (Wisconsin)

=== Railroads ===
- Amtrak
- Canadian National
- Canadian Pacific
- Union Pacific

=== Airports ===
- Necedah Airport (KDAF), serves the county and surrounding communities.
- Mauston–New Lisbon Union Airport (82C) enhances county service.

=== Adjacent counties ===
- Wood County – north
- Adams County – east
- Columbia County – southeast
- Sauk County – south
- Vernon County – southwest
- Monroe County – west
- Jackson County – northwest

=== National protected area ===
- Necedah National Wildlife Refuge

=== United States Military Posts ===
- Volk Field Air National Guard Base

== Demographics ==
Historical population
| Census | Pop. | Note | %± |
|---|---|---|---|
| 1860 | 8,770 | | — |
| 1870 | 12,372 | | 41.1% |
| 1880 | 15,582 | | 25.9% |
| 1890 | 17,121 | | 9.9% |
| 1900 | 20,629 | | 20.5% |
| 1910 | 19,569 | | −5.1% |
| 1920 | 19,209 | | −1.8% |
| 1930 | 17,264 | | −10.1% |
| 1940 | 18,708 | | 8.4% |
| 1950 | 18,930 | | 1.2% |
| 1960 | 17,490 | | −7.6% |
| 1970 | 18,455 | | 5.5% |
| 1980 | 21,039 | | 14.0% |
| 1990 | 21,650 | | 2.9% |
| 2000 | 24,316 | | 12.3% |
| 2010 | 26,664 | | 9.7% |
| 2020 | 26,718 | | 0.2% |
| 2025 (est.) | 26,649 | ▼ | −0.3% |
U.S. Decennial Census; 1790–1960 1900–1990; 1990–2000 2010 2020

=== Racial and ethnic composition ===
Juneau County, Wisconsin – Racial and ethnic composition Note: the US Census treats Hispanic/Latino as an ethnic category. This table excludes Latinos from the racial categories and assigns them to a separate category. Hispanics/Latinos may be of any race.
| Race / ethnicity (NH = Non-Hispanic) | Pop 1980 | Pop 1990 | Pop 2000 | Pop 2010 | Pop 2020 | % 1980 | % 1990 | % 2000 | % 2010 | % 2020 |
|---|---|---|---|---|---|---|---|---|---|---|
| White alone (NH) | 20,681 | 21,228 | 23,318 | 24,706 | 24,008 | 98.30% | 98.05% | 95.90% | 92.66% | 89.86% |
| Black or African American alone (NH) | 19 | 28 | 76 | 545 | 548 | 0.09% | 0.13% | 0.31% | 2.04% | 2.05% |
| Native American or Alaska Native alone (NH) | 176 | 162 | 310 | 361 | 355 | 0.84% | 0.75% | 1.27% | 1.35% | 1.33% |
| Asian alone (NH) | 30 | 76 | 100 | 113 | 147 | 0.14% | 0.35% | 0.41% | 0.42% | 0.55% |
| Native Hawaiian or Pacific Islander alone (NH) | x | x | 3 | 4 | 1 | x | x | 0.01% | 0.02% | 0.00% |
| Other race alone (NH) | 28 | 4 | 5 | 9 | 52 | 0.13% | 0.02% | 0.02% | 0.03% | 0.19% |
| Mixed race or Multiracial (NH) | x | x | 157 | 239 | 880 | x | x | 0.65% | 0.90% | 3.29% |
| Hispanic or Latino (any race) | 105 | 152 | 347 | 687 | 727 | 0.50% | 0.70% | 1.43% | 2.58% | 2.72% |
| Total | 21,039 | 21,650 | 24,316 | 26,664 | 26,718 | 100.00% | 100.00% | 100.00% | 100.00% | 100.00% |

=== 2020 census ===
As of the 2020 census, the county had a population of 26,718, a median age of 46.0 years, 20.0% of residents were under the age of 18, and 21.2% of residents were 65 years of age or older. For every 100 females there were 113.7 males, and for every 100 females age 18 and over there were 115.6 males age 18 and over.

The population density was 34.8 people per square mile (13.4 people/km^{2}). There were 14,441 housing units at an average density of 18.8 units per square mile (7.3 units/km^{2}).

There were 10,741 households in the county, of which 25.1% had children under the age of 18 living in them. Of all households, 47.6% were married-couple households, 20.9% were households with a male householder and no spouse or partner present, and 22.5% were households with a female householder and no spouse or partner present. About 29.8% of all households were made up of individuals and 13.9% had someone living alone who was 65 years of age or older.

Of the housing units, 25.6% were vacant. Among occupied housing units, 75.5% were owner-occupied and 24.5% were renter-occupied. The homeowner vacancy rate was 1.7% and the rental vacancy rate was 8.0%.

The racial makeup of the county was 90.9% White, 2.1% Black or African American, 1.4% American Indian and Alaska Native, 0.6% Asian, <0.1% Native Hawaiian and Pacific Islander, 0.9% from some other race, and 4.1% from two or more races. Hispanic or Latino residents of any race comprised 2.7% of the population.

<0.1% of residents lived in urban areas, while 100.0% lived in rural areas.

=== 2000 census ===
2000 Census Age Pyramid for Juneau County

As of the census of 2000, there were 24,316 people, 9,696 households, and 6,699 families residing in the county. The population density was 32 people per square mile (12 people/km^{2}). There were 12,370 housing units at an average density of 16 units per square mile (6.2 units/km^{2}). The racial makeup of the county was 96.61% White, 0.33% Black or African American, 1.30% Native American, 0.44% Asian, 0.02% Pacific Islander, 0.57% from other races, and 0.74% from two or more races. 1.43% of the population were Hispanic or Latino of any race. 41.2% were of German, 9.9% Irish, 8.8% Norwegian, 6.5% Polish and 5.8% English ancestry.

There were 9,696 households, out of which 30.4% had children under the age of 18 living with them, 55.5% were married couples living together, 8.8% had a female householder with no husband present, and 30.9% were non-families. 26.0% of all households were made up of individuals, and 12.30% had someone living alone who was 65 years of age or older. The average household size was 2.47 and the average family size was 2.96.

In the county, the population was spread out, with 25.4% under the age of 18, 6.9% from 18 to 24, 26.6% from 25 to 44, 24.3% from 45 to 64, and 16.8% who were 65 years of age or older. The median age was 39 years. For every 100 females there were 100.1 males. For every 100 females age 18 and over, there were 97.4 males.

In 2017, there were 282 births, giving a general fertility rate of 72.7 births per 1000 women aged 15–44, the 12th highest rate out of all 72 Wisconsin counties. Of these, only 2 of the births occurred at home. Additionally, there were 16 reported induced abortions performed on women of Juneau County residence in 2017, a figure higher than the records for the preceding four years.

== Communities ==
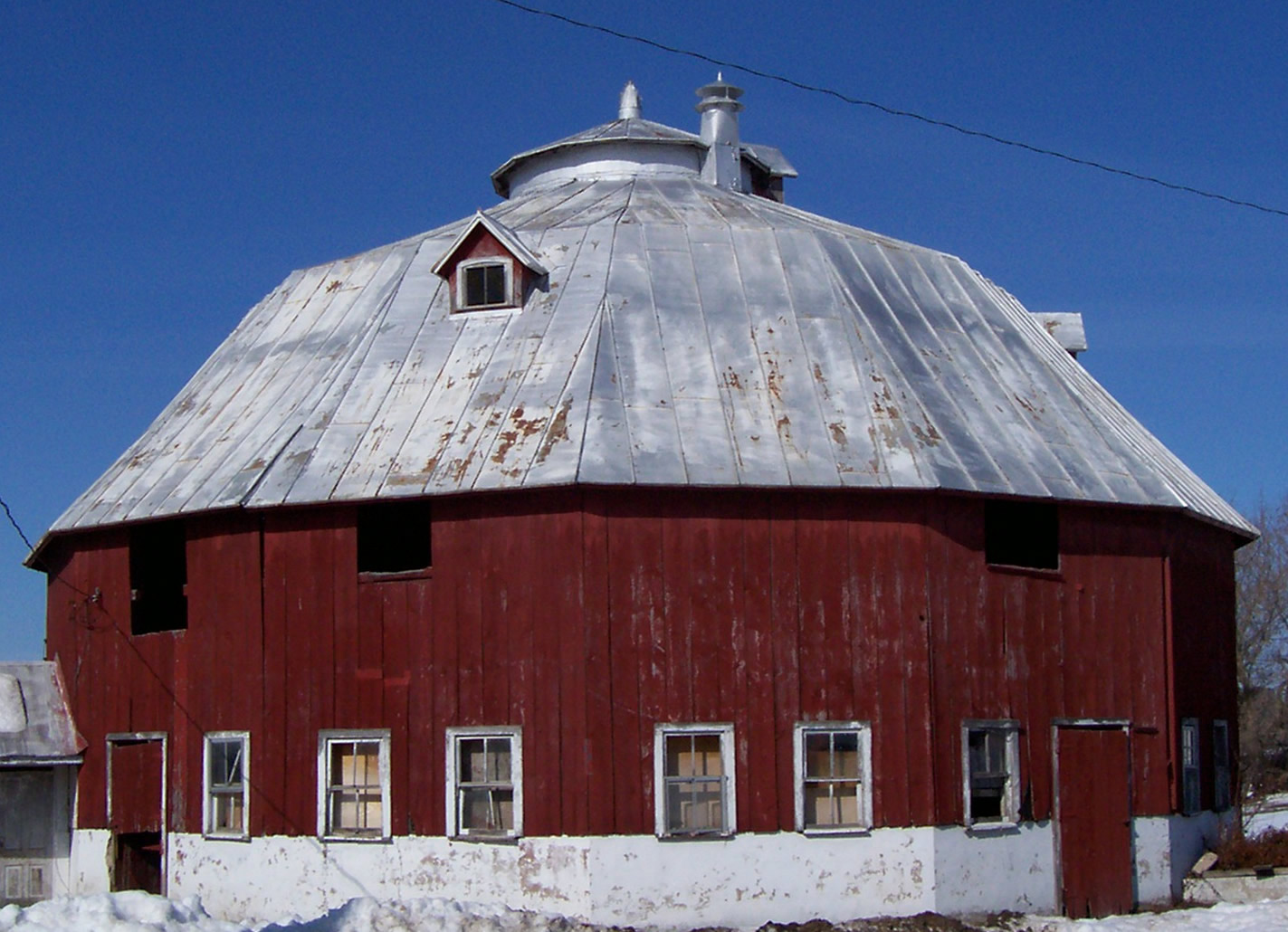
10 sided barn south of Mauston

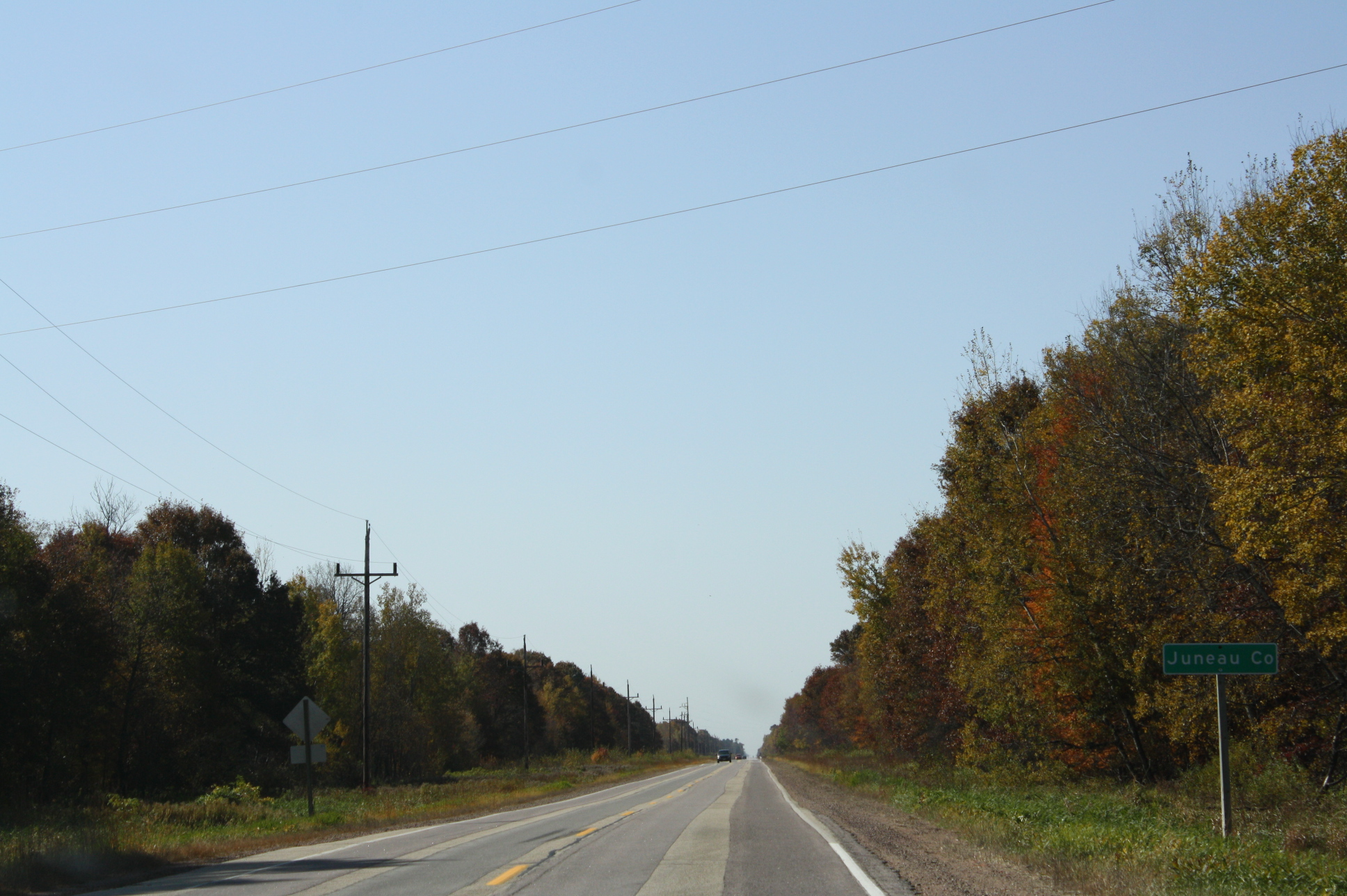
Welcome sign on WIS 173

=== Cities ===
- Elroy
- Mauston (county seat)
- New Lisbon
- Wisconsin Dells (mostly in Columbia County, Adams County, and Sauk County)

=== Villages ===
- Camp Douglas
- Hustler
- Lyndon Station
- Necedah
- Union Center
- Wonewoc

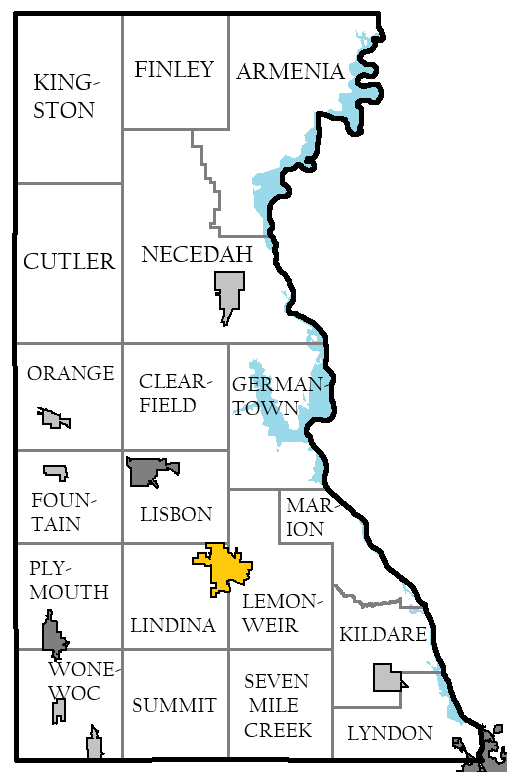
Towns of Juneau County

=== Towns ===
- Armenia
- Clearfield
- Cutler
- Finley
- Fountain
- Germantown
- Kildare
- Kingston
- Lemonweir
- Lindina
- Lisbon
- Lyndon
- Marion
- Necedah
- Orange
- Plymouth
- Seven Mile Creek
- Summit
- Wonewoc

=== Unincorporated communities ===
- Cloverdale
- Cutler
- Finley
- Indian Heights
- Kelly
- Lemonweir
- Lindina
- Lone Rock
- Mather
- Meadow Valley
- New Miner
- Orange Mill
- Sprague

== Politics ==
United States presidential election results for Juneau County, Wisconsin
| Year | Republican | | Democratic | | Third party(ies) | |
| Year | No. | % | No. | % | No. | % |
|---|---|---|---|---|---|---|
| 1892 | 1,945 | 47.11% | 1,978 | 47.91% | 206 | 4.99% |
| 1896 | 2,832 | 61.49% | 1,671 | 36.28% | 103 | 2.24% |
| 1900 | 2,914 | 63.35% | 1,586 | 34.48% | 100 | 2.17% |
| 1904 | 3,234 | 70.11% | 1,244 | 26.97% | 135 | 2.93% |
| 1908 | 2,454 | 57.59% | 1,691 | 39.69% | 116 | 2.72% |
| 1912 | 1,322 | 41.48% | 1,236 | 38.78% | 629 | 19.74% |
| 1916 | 2,292 | 58.65% | 1,442 | 36.90% | 174 | 4.45% |
| 1920 | 4,385 | 81.22% | 774 | 14.34% | 240 | 4.45% |
| 1924 | 1,917 | 31.10% | 403 | 6.54% | 3,844 | 62.36% |
| 1928 | 3,777 | 57.74% | 2,708 | 41.40% | 56 | 0.86% |
| 1932 | 2,018 | 29.37% | 4,723 | 68.75% | 129 | 1.88% |
| 1936 | 3,084 | 37.83% | 4,544 | 55.74% | 524 | 6.43% |
| 1940 | 5,268 | 60.51% | 3,354 | 38.53% | 84 | 0.96% |
| 1944 | 4,733 | 61.97% | 2,857 | 37.41% | 47 | 0.62% |
| 1948 | 3,793 | 55.71% | 2,889 | 42.43% | 127 | 1.87% |
| 1952 | 5,978 | 73.22% | 2,163 | 26.49% | 23 | 0.28% |
| 1956 | 5,135 | 67.58% | 2,428 | 31.96% | 35 | 0.46% |
| 1960 | 4,997 | 60.60% | 3,238 | 39.27% | 11 | 0.13% |
| 1964 | 2,976 | 39.33% | 4,583 | 60.57% | 8 | 0.11% |
| 1968 | 3,828 | 53.60% | 2,595 | 36.33% | 719 | 10.07% |
| 1972 | 4,833 | 60.19% | 2,943 | 36.65% | 254 | 3.16% |
| 1976 | 4,242 | 46.73% | 4,512 | 49.71% | 323 | 3.56% |
| 1980 | 5,591 | 55.14% | 3,884 | 38.30% | 665 | 6.56% |
| 1984 | 5,629 | 63.62% | 3,152 | 35.62% | 67 | 0.76% |
| 1988 | 4,869 | 56.21% | 3,734 | 43.11% | 59 | 0.68% |
| 1992 | 4,051 | 36.85% | 4,177 | 38.00% | 2,765 | 25.15% |
| 1996 | 3,226 | 35.13% | 4,331 | 47.17% | 1,625 | 17.70% |
| 2000 | 4,910 | 48.05% | 4,813 | 47.10% | 495 | 4.84% |
| 2004 | 6,473 | 52.29% | 5,734 | 46.32% | 172 | 1.39% |
| 2008 | 5,148 | 44.65% | 6,186 | 53.65% | 196 | 1.70% |
| 2012 | 5,411 | 45.75% | 6,242 | 52.78% | 174 | 1.47% |
| 2016 | 7,130 | 60.76% | 4,073 | 34.71% | 532 | 4.53% |
| 2020 | 8,749 | 63.82% | 4,746 | 34.62% | 214 | 1.56% |
| 2024 | 9,525 | 65.45% | 4,854 | 33.35% | 174 | 1.20% |

Juneau County was long considered a bellwether in presidential elections. From 1964 through 2016, the winning candidate has carried the county in every presidential election; however, this trend ended in 2020.

== See also ==
- National Register of Historic Places listings in Juneau County, Wisconsin
