= Wisconsin's 3rd congressional district =

U.S. House district for Wisconsin

Coordinates: 44°03′23″N 90°53′30″W

- Interactive map of district boundaries since January 3, 2023
- Representative: Derrick Van Orden; R–Prairie du Chien
- Area: 11,544.19 mi^{2} (29,899.3 km^{2})
- Distribution: 51.42% rural; 48.58% urban
- Population (2025): 744,848
- Median household income: $75,224
- Ethnicity: 88.90% White; 5.33% Two or more races; 4.01% Hispanic; 2.38% Asian; 1.79% other; 1.07% Black; 0.51% Native American; 0.03% Pacific Islander Americans
- Cook PVI: R+3
- Created: 1849

Wisconsin's 3rd congressional district covers most of the Driftless Area in southwestern and western Wisconsin. The district includes the cities of Eau Claire, La Crosse, and Stevens Point, and much of the Wisconsin side of the Minneapolis-St. Paul metropolitan area. It borders the states of Minnesota, Iowa, and Illinois. Republican Derrick Van Orden has represented the district since 2023.

The political nature of the district is moderate, given its combination of an overall rural and suburban character counterbalanced by two significant urban centers (Eau Claire and La Crosse) and the Twin Cities suburbs. It historically elected moderate Republicans; before Ron Kind's 1996 victory, only two Democrats represented it in the 20th century. Al Gore, John Kerry, and Barack Obama all carried the district at the presidential level; it then narrowly voted for Donald Trump in 2016 and again in 2020 with slightly increased margins, leading the Cook Partisan Voting Index to adjust the district's partisan lean in 2021 from "even" to R+4.

== Composition ==
=== By county ===
| County | Pop. | Share |
|---|---|---|
| La Crosse | 120,784 | 16.39% |
| Eau Claire | 105,710 | 14.35% |
| Portage | 70,377 | 9.55% |
| Grant | 51,938 | 7.05% |
| Dunn | 45,440 | 6.17% |
| Wood | 43,820 | 5.95% |
| Pierce | 42,212 | 5.73% |
| Monroe | 41,589 | 5.65% |
| Chippewa | 35,111 | 4.77% |
| Trempealeau | 30,760 | 4.18% |
| Vernon | 30,714 | 4.17% |
| Juneau | 20,806 | 2.82% |
| Adams | 20,654 | 2.80% |
| Jackson | 19,088 | 2.59% |
| Richland | 17,304 | 2.35% |
| Crawford | 16,113 | 2.19% |
| Buffalo | 13,317 | 1.81% |
| Pepin | 7,318 | 0.99% |
| Sauk | 3,661 | 0.50% |

=== By community ===
For the 118th and successive Congresses (based on redistricting following the 2020 census), the district contains all or portions of the following counties, towns, and municipalities:

Adams County (20)

All 20 towns and municipalities

Buffalo County (23)

All 23 towns and municipalities

Chippewa County (7)

Chippewa Falls, Eau Claire (shared with Eau Claire County), Hallie, Howard, Lafayette, Lake Hallie, Wheaton

Crawford County (22)

All 22 towns and municipalities

Dunn County (30)

All 30 towns and municipalities

Eau Claire County (18)

All 18 towns and municipalities

Grant County (52)

All 52 towns and municipalities

Jackson County (21)

Albion, Alma, Alma Center, Black River Falls, Brockway, Curran, Franklin, Garfield, Hixton (town), Hixton (village), Irving, Komensky, Manchester, Melrose (town), Melrose (village), Merrillan (part; also 7th), Millston, North Bend, Northfield, Springfield, Taylor

Juneau County (23)

Camp Douglas, Clearfield (part; also 7th), Elroy, Fountain, Germantown (part; also 7th), Hustler, Kildare, Lemonweir, Lindina, Lisbon, Lyndon, Lyndon Station, Marion, Mauston, New Lisbon, Orange, Plymouth, Seven Mile Creek, Summit, Union Center, Wisconsin Dells (part; also 2nd and 6th; shared with Adams, Columbia, and Sauk counties), Wonewoc (town), Wonewoc (village)

La Crosse County (18)

All 18 towns and municipalities

Monroe County (29)

Adrian, Angelo, Cashton, Clifton, Glendale, Grant, Greenfield, Kendall, Jefferson, Kendall, Lafayette, Leon, Little Falls, Melvina, New Lyme, Norwalk, Oakdale (town), Oakdale (village), Portland, Ridgeville, Sheldon, Sparta (city), Sparta (town), Tomah (city), Tomah (town), Wellington, Wells, Wilton (town), Wilton (village)

Pepin County (11)

All 11 towns and municipalities

Pierce County (25)

All 25 towns and municipalities

Portage County (28)

All 28 towns and municipalities

Richland County (22)

All 22 towns and municipalities

Sauk County (5)

Ironton (town) (part; also 2nd), Ironton (village), La Valle (town), La Valle (village), Woodland

Trempealeau County (26)

All 26 towns and municipalities

Vernon County (33)

All 33 towns and municipalities

Wood County (16)

Biron, Cranmoor, Grand Rapids, Milladore (town), Milladore (village), Nekoosa, Port Edwards (town), Port Edwards (village), Rudolph (town), Rudolph (village), Saratoga, Seneca, Sherry, Sigel, Vesper, Wisconsin Rapids

== List of members representing the district ==
| Member | Party | Years | Cong ress | Electoral history | District |
|---|---|---|---|---|---|
District established March 4, 1849
| James Duane Doty (Menasha) | Democratic | March 4, 1849 – March 3, 1851 | 31st 32nd | Elected in 1848. Re-elected in 1850. Retired. | Brown, Calumet, Columbia, Dodge, Fond du Lac, Jefferson, Manitowoc, Marquette, Sheboygan, Washington, and Winnebago counties (and Door, Green Lake, Kewaunee, Oconto, Outagamie, Shawano, Waupaca, and Waushara counties created from this territory during the 1850s) |
| James Duane Doty (Menasha) | Independent Democratic | March 4, 1851 – March 3, 1853 | 31st 32nd | Elected in 1848. Re-elected in 1850. Retired. | Brown, Calumet, Columbia, Dodge, Fond du Lac, Jefferson, Manitowoc, Marquette, Sheboygan, Washington, and Winnebago counties (and Door, Green Lake, Kewaunee, Oconto, Outagamie, Shawano, Waupaca, and Waushara counties created from this territory during the 1850s) |
| John B. Macy (Fond du Lac) | Democratic | March 4, 1853 – March 3, 1855 | 33rd | Elected in 1852. Lost re-election. | Brown, Calumet, Columbia, Dodge, Fond du Lac, Jefferson, Manitowoc, Marquette, Sheboygan, Washington, and Winnebago counties (and Door, Green Lake, Kewaunee, Oconto, Outagamie, Shawano, Waupaca, and Waushara counties created from this territory during the 1850s) |
| Charles Billinghurst (Juneau) | Opposition | March 4, 1855 – March 3, 1857 | 34th 35th | Elected in 1854. Re-elected in 1856. Lost re-election. | Brown, Calumet, Columbia, Dodge, Fond du Lac, Jefferson, Manitowoc, Marquette, Sheboygan, Washington, and Winnebago counties (and Door, Green Lake, Kewaunee, Oconto, Outagamie, Shawano, Waupaca, and Waushara counties created from this territory during the 1850s) |
| Charles Billinghurst (Juneau) | Republican | March 4, 1857 – March 3, 1859 | 34th 35th | Elected in 1854. Re-elected in 1856. Lost re-election. | Brown, Calumet, Columbia, Dodge, Fond du Lac, Jefferson, Manitowoc, Marquette, Sheboygan, Washington, and Winnebago counties (and Door, Green Lake, Kewaunee, Oconto, Outagamie, Shawano, Waupaca, and Waushara counties created from this territory during the 1850s) |
| Charles H. Larrabee (Horicon) | Democratic | March 4, 1859 – March 3, 1861 | 36th | Elected in 1858. Lost re-election. | Brown, Calumet, Columbia, Dodge, Fond du Lac, Jefferson, Manitowoc, Marquette, Sheboygan, Washington, and Winnebago counties (and Door, Green Lake, Kewaunee, Oconto, Outagamie, Shawano, Waupaca, and Waushara counties created from this territory during the 1850s) |
| A. Scott Sloan (Beaver Dam) | Republican | March 4, 1861 – March 3, 1863 | 37th | Elected in 1860. Retired. | Brown, Calumet, Columbia, Dodge, Fond du Lac, Jefferson, Manitowoc, Marquette, Sheboygan, Washington, and Winnebago counties (and Door, Green Lake, Kewaunee, Oconto, Outagamie, Shawano, Waupaca, and Waushara counties created from this territory during the 1850s) |
| Amasa Cobb (Mineral Point) | Republican | March 4, 1863 – March 3, 1871 | 38th 39th 40th 41st | Elected in 1862. Re-elected in 1864. Re-elected in 1866. Re-elected in 1868. Retired. | Crawford, Grant, Green, Iowa, Lafayette, Richland, and Sauk counties |
| J. Allen Barber (Lancaster) | Republican | March 4, 1871 – March 3, 1875 | 42nd 43rd | Elected in 1870. Re-elected in 1872. Retired. | Crawford, Grant, Green, Iowa, Lafayette, Richland, and Sauk counties |
| J. Allen Barber (Lancaster) | Republican | March 4, 1871 – March 3, 1875 | 42nd 43rd | Elected in 1870. Re-elected in 1872. Retired. | Crawford, Grant, Green, Iowa, Lafayette, and Richland counties |
| Henry S. Magoon (Darlington) | Republican | March 4, 1875 – March 3, 1877 | 44th | Elected in 1874. Lost renomination. | Crawford, Grant, Green, Iowa, Lafayette, and Richland counties |
| George Cochrane Hazelton (Boscobel) | Republican | March 4, 1877 – March 3, 1883 | 45th 46th 47th | Elected in 1876. Re-elected in 1878. Re-elected in 1880. Lost renomination. | Crawford, Grant, Green, Iowa, Lafayette, and Richland counties |
| Burr W. Jones (Madison) | Democratic | March 4, 1883 – March 3, 1885 | 48th | Elected in 1882. Lost re-election. | Dane, Grant, Green, Iowa, and Lafayette counties |
| Robert M. La Follette (Madison) | Republican | March 4, 1885 – March 3, 1891 | 49th 50th 51st | Elected in 1884. Re-elected in 1886. Re-elected in 1888. Lost re-election. | Dane, Grant, Green, Iowa, and Lafayette counties |
| Allen R. Bushnell (Madison) | Democratic | March 4, 1891 – March 3, 1893 | 52nd | Elected in 1890. Retired. | Dane, Grant, Green, Iowa, and Lafayette counties |
| Joseph W. Babcock (Necedah) | Republican | March 4, 1893 – March 3, 1907 | 53rd 54th 55th 56th 57th 58th 59th | Elected in 1892. Re-elected in 1894. Re-elected in 1896. Re-elected in 1898. Re-elected in 1900. Re-elected in 1902. Re-elected in 1904. Lost re-election. | Adams, Crawford, Grant, Iowa, Juneau, Richland, Sauk, and Vernon counties |
| Joseph W. Babcock (Necedah) | Republican | March 4, 1893 – March 3, 1907 | 53rd 54th 55th 56th 57th 58th 59th | Elected in 1892. Re-elected in 1894. Re-elected in 1896. Re-elected in 1898. Re-elected in 1900. Re-elected in 1902. Re-elected in 1904. Lost re-election. | Crawford, Grant, Iowa, Juneau, Richland, Sauk, and Vernon counties |
| James William Murphy (Platteville) | Democratic | March 4, 1907 – March 3, 1909 | 60th | Elected in 1906. Lost re-election. | Crawford, Grant, Iowa, Juneau, Richland, Sauk, and Vernon counties |
| Arthur W. Kopp (Platteville) | Republican | March 4, 1909 – March 3, 1913 | 61st 62nd | Elected in 1908. Re-elected in 1910. Retired. | Crawford, Grant, Iowa, Juneau, Richland, Sauk, and Vernon counties |
| John M. Nelson (Madison) | Republican | March 4, 1913 – March 3, 1919 | 63rd 64th 65th | Redistricted from the 2nd district and re-elected in 1912. Re-elected in 1914. Re-elected in 1916. Lost renomination. | Crawford, Dane, Grant, Green, Iowa, Lafayette, and Richland counties |
| James G. Monahan (Darlington) | Republican | March 4, 1919 – March 3, 1921 | 66th | Elected in 1918. Lost renomination. | Crawford, Dane, Grant, Green, Iowa, Lafayette, and Richland counties |
| John M. Nelson (Madison) | Republican | March 4, 1921 – March 3, 1933 | 67th 68th 69th 70th 71st 72nd | Elected in 1920. Re-elected in 1922. Re-elected in 1924. Re-elected in 1926. Re-elected in 1928. Re-elected in 1930. Lost renomination. | Crawford, Dane, Grant, Green, Iowa, Lafayette, and Richland counties |
| Gardner R. Withrow (La Crosse) | Republican | March 4, 1933 – January 3, 1935 | 73rd 74th 75th | Redistricted from the 7th district and re-elected in 1932. Re-elected in 1934. Re-elected in 1936. Lost re-election. | Crawford, Grant, Iowa, Juneau, La Crosse, Lafayette, Monroe, Richland, Sauk, and Vernon counties |
| Gardner R. Withrow (La Crosse) | Progressive | January 3, 1935 – January 3, 1939 | 73rd 74th 75th | Redistricted from the 7th district and re-elected in 1932. Re-elected in 1934. Re-elected in 1936. Lost re-election. | Crawford, Grant, Iowa, Juneau, La Crosse, Lafayette, Monroe, Richland, Sauk, and Vernon counties |
| Harry W. Griswold (West Salem) | Republican | January 3, 1939 – July 4, 1939 | 76th | Elected in 1938. Died. | Crawford, Grant, Iowa, Juneau, La Crosse, Lafayette, Monroe, Richland, Sauk, and Vernon counties |
| Vacant | | July 4, 1939 – January 3, 1941 | 76th | | Crawford, Grant, Iowa, Juneau, La Crosse, Lafayette, Monroe, Richland, Sauk, and Vernon counties |
| William H. Stevenson (La Crosse) | Republican | January 3, 1941 – January 3, 1949 | 77th 78th 79th 80th | Elected in 1940. Re-elected in 1942. Re-elected in 1944. Re-elected in 1946. Lost renomination. | Crawford, Grant, Iowa, Juneau, La Crosse, Lafayette, Monroe, Richland, Sauk, and Vernon counties |
| Gardner R. Withrow (La Crosse) | Republican | January 3, 1949 – January 3, 1961 | 81st 82nd 83rd 84th 85th 86th | Elected in 1948. Re-elected in 1950. Re-elected in 1952. Re-elected in 1954. Re-elected in 1956. Re-elected in 1958. Retired. | Crawford, Grant, Iowa, Juneau, La Crosse, Lafayette, Monroe, Richland, Sauk, and Vernon counties |
| Vernon Wallace Thomson (Richland Center) | Republican | January 3, 1961 – December 31, 1974 | 87th 88th 89th 90th 91st 92nd 93rd | Elected in 1960. Re-elected in 1962. Re-elected in 1964. Re-elected in 1966. Re-elected in 1968. Re-elected in 1970. Re-elected in 1972. Lost re-election and resigned early. | Crawford, Grant, Iowa, Juneau, La Crosse, Lafayette, Monroe, Richland, Sauk, and Vernon counties |
| Vernon Wallace Thomson (Richland Center) | Republican | January 3, 1961 – December 31, 1974 | 87th 88th 89th 90th 91st 92nd 93rd | Elected in 1960. Re-elected in 1962. Re-elected in 1964. Re-elected in 1966. Re-elected in 1968. Re-elected in 1970. Re-elected in 1972. Lost re-election and resigned early. | Buffalo, Crawford, Grant, Iowa, Jackson, Juneau, La Crosse, Lafayette, Monroe, Pepin, Pierce, Richland, Sauk, Trempealeau, and Vernon counties |
| Vernon Wallace Thomson (Richland Center) | Republican | January 3, 1961 – December 31, 1974 | 87th 88th 89th 90th 91st 92nd 93rd | Elected in 1960. Re-elected in 1962. Re-elected in 1964. Re-elected in 1966. Re-elected in 1968. Re-elected in 1970. Re-elected in 1972. Lost re-election and resigned early. | Barron, Buffalo, Crawford, Dunn, Eau Claire, Grant, Jackson, La Crosse, Pepin, Pierce, Polk, Richland, St. Croix, Trempealeau, and Vernon counties & most of Monroe County: Monroe County; Town of Adrian; Town of Angelo; Town of Grant; Town of Greenfield; Town of Jefferson; Town of Lafayette; Town of La Grange; Town of Leon; Town of Lincoln; Town of Little Falls; Town of New Lyme; Town of Portland; Town of Ridgeville; Town of Sheldon; Town of Sparta; Town of Tomah; Town of Wells; Town of Wilton; Village of Cashton; Village of Melvina; Village of Norwalk; Village of Wilton; City of Sparta; City of Tomah |
| Vacant | | December 31, 1974 – January 3, 1975 | 93rd | | |
| Alvin Baldus (Menomonie) | Democratic | January 3, 1975 – January 3, 1981 | 94th 95th 96th | Elected in 1974. Re-elected in 1976. Re-elected in 1978. Lost re-election. | |
| Steve Gunderson (Osseo) | Republican | January 3, 1981 – January 3, 1997 | 97th 98th 99th 100th 101st 102nd 103rd 104th | Elected in 1980. Re-elected in 1982. Re-elected in 1984. Re-elected in 1986. Re-elected in 1988. Re-elected in 1990. Re-elected in 1992. Re-elected in 1994. Retired. | |
| Steve Gunderson (Osseo) | Republican | January 3, 1981 – January 3, 1997 | 97th 98th 99th 100th 101st 102nd 103rd 104th | Elected in 1980. Re-elected in 1982. Re-elected in 1984. Re-elected in 1986. Re-elected in 1988. Re-elected in 1990. Re-elected in 1992. Re-elected in 1994. Retired. | Barron, Buffalo, Crawford, Dunn, Eau Claire, Grant, Jackson, La Crosse, Pepin, Pierce, Polk, Richland, St. Croix, Trempealeau, and Vernon counties & most of Clark County, most of Grant County, southern of Polk County, & western of Richland County: Clark County; Town of Beaver; Town of Butler; Town of Dewhurst; Town of Eaton; Town of Foster; Town of Fremont; Town of Grant; Town of Hendren; Town of Hewett; Town of Levis; Town of Loyal; Town of Lynn; Town of Mead; Town of Mentor; Town of Pine Valley; Town of Seif; Town of Sherman; Town of Sherwood; Town of Unity; Town of Warner; Town of Washburn; Town of Weston; Town of York; Village of Grantors; City of Greenwood; City of Loyal; City of Neillsville; Grant County; Town of Beetown; Town of Bloomington; Town of Boscobel; Town of Cassville; Town of Castle Rock; Town of Clifton; Town of Ellenboro; Town of Fennimore; Town of Glen Haven; Town of Harrison; Town of Hickory Grove; Town of Jamestown; Town of Liberty; Town of Lima; Town of Little Grant; Town of Marion; Town of Millville; Town of Mt. Hope; Town of Mt. Ida; Town of Muscoda; Town of North Lancaster; Town of Paris; Town of Patch Grove; Town of Platteville; Town of Potosi; Town of South Lancaster; Town of Waterloo; Town of Watterstown; Town of Wingville; Town of Woodman; Town of Wyalusing; Village of Bagley; Village of Bloomington; Village of Blue River; Village of Cassville; Village of Dickeyville; Village of Mt. Hope; Village of Patch Grove; Village of Potosi; Village of Tennyson; Village of Woodman; the part of the village of Muscoda in the county; City of Boscobel; City of Fennimore; City of Lancaster; City of Platteville; Polk County; Town of Alden; Town of Apple River; Town of Balsam Lake; Town of Beaver; Town of Black Brook; Town of Clayton; Town of Clear Lake; Town of Farmington; Town of Garfield; Town of Johnstown; Town of Lincoln; Town of Osceola; Town of St. Croix Falls; Village of Balsam Lake; Village of Centuria; Village of Clayton; Village of Clear Lake; Village of Dresser; Village of Osceola; the part of the village of Turtle Lake in the county; City of Amery; City of St. Croix Falls; Richland County; Town of Akan; Town of Bloom; Town of Dayton; Town of Eagle; Town of Forest; Town of Henrietta; Town of Marshall; Town of Richland; Town of Richwood; Town of Rockbridge; Town of Sylvan; Village of Boaz; Village of Yuba; the part of the village of Viola in the county; City of Richland Center |
| Steve Gunderson (Osseo) | Republican | January 3, 1981 – January 3, 1997 | 97th 98th 99th 100th 101st 102nd 103rd 104th | Elected in 1980. Re-elected in 1982. Re-elected in 1984. Re-elected in 1986. Re-elected in 1988. Re-elected in 1990. Re-elected in 1992. Re-elected in 1994. Retired. | 1993–2003 |
| Ron Kind (La Crosse) | Democratic | January 3, 1997 – January 3, 2023 | 105th 106th 107th 108th 109th 110th 111th 112th 113th 114th 115th 116th 117th | Elected in 1996. Re-elected in 1998. Re-elected in 2000. Re-elected in 2002. Re-elected in 2004. Re-elected in 2006. Re-elected in 2008. Re-elected in 2010. Re-elected in 2012. Re-elected in 2014. Re-elected in 2016. Re-elected in 2018. Re-elected in 2020. Retired. | 1993–2003 |
| Ron Kind (La Crosse) | Democratic | January 3, 1997 – January 3, 2023 | 105th 106th 107th 108th 109th 110th 111th 112th 113th 114th 115th 116th 117th | Elected in 1996. Re-elected in 1998. Re-elected in 2000. Re-elected in 2002. Re-elected in 2004. Re-elected in 2006. Re-elected in 2008. Re-elected in 2010. Re-elected in 2012. Re-elected in 2014. Re-elected in 2016. Re-elected in 2018. Re-elected in 2020. Retired. | 2003–2013 |
| Ron Kind (La Crosse) | Democratic | January 3, 1997 – January 3, 2023 | 105th 106th 107th 108th 109th 110th 111th 112th 113th 114th 115th 116th 117th | Elected in 1996. Re-elected in 1998. Re-elected in 2000. Re-elected in 2002. Re-elected in 2004. Re-elected in 2006. Re-elected in 2008. Re-elected in 2010. Re-elected in 2012. Re-elected in 2014. Re-elected in 2016. Re-elected in 2018. Re-elected in 2020. Retired. | 2013–2023 |
| Derrick Van Orden (Prairie du Chien) | Republican | January 3, 2023 – present | 118th 119th | Elected in 2022. Re-elected in 2024. Lost re-election. | 2023–present |
| Rebecca Cooke (Colfax) | Democratic | Assuming office on January 3, 2027 | | Elected in 2026. | 2023–present |

== Recent election results ==
=== 2002 district boundaries (2002–2011) ===
| Year | Date | Elected | | | | Defeated | | | | Total | Plurality |
|---|---|---|---|---|---|---|---|---|---|---|---|
| 2002 | Nov. 5 | Ron Kind (inc) | Democratic | 131,038 | 62.82% | Bill Arndt | Rep. | 69,955 | 33.54% | 208,581 | 61,083 |
| 2002 | Nov. 5 | Ron Kind (inc) | Democratic | 131,038 | 62.82% | Jeff Zastrow | Lib. | 6,674 | 3.20% | 208,581 | 61,083 |
| 2004 | Nov. 2 | Ron Kind (inc) | Democratic | 204,856 | 56.43% | Dale W. Schultz | Rep. | 157,866 | 43.49% | 363,008 | 46,990 |
| 2006 | Nov. 7 | Ron Kind (inc) | Democratic | 163,322 | 64.79% | Paul R. Nelson | Rep. | 88,523 | 35.12% | 252,087 | 74,799 |
| 2008 | Nov. 4 | Ron Kind (inc) | Democratic | 225,208 | 63.19% | Paul Stark | Rep. | 122,760 | 34.44% | 356,400 | 102,448 |
| 2008 | Nov. 4 | Ron Kind (inc) | Democratic | 225,208 | 63.19% | Kevin Barrett | Lib. | 8,236 | 2.31% | 356,400 | 102,448 |
| 2010 | Nov. 2 | Ron Kind (inc) | Democratic | 126,380 | 50.28% | Dan Kapanke | Rep. | 116,838 | 46.49% | 251,340 | 9,542 |
| 2010 | Nov. 2 | Ron Kind (inc) | Democratic | 126,380 | 50.28% | Michael Krsiean | Ind. | 8,001 | 3.18% | 251,340 | 9,542 |

=== 2011 district boundaries (2012–2021) ===
| Year | Date | Elected | | | | Defeated | | | | Total | Plurality |
|---|---|---|---|---|---|---|---|---|---|---|---|
| 2012 | Nov. 6 | Ron Kind (inc) | Democratic | 217,712 | 64.08% | Ray Boland | Rep. | 121,713 | 35.82% | 339,764 | 95,999 |
| 2014 | Nov. 4 | Ron Kind (inc) | Democratic | 155,368 | 56.46% | Tony Kurtz | Rep. | 119,540 | 43.44% | 275,161 | 35,828 |
| 2014 | Nov. 4 | Ron Kind (inc) | Democratic | 155,368 | 56.46% | Ken Van Doren (write-in) | Ind. | 128 | 0.05% | 275,161 | 35,828 |
| 2016 | Nov. 8 | Ron Kind (inc) | Democratic | 257,401 | 98.86% | Ryan Peterson (write-in) | Rep. | 169 | 0.06% | 260,370 | 254,601 |
| 2018 | Nov. 6 | Ron Kind (inc) | Democratic | 187,888 | 59.65% | Steve Toft | Rep. | 126,980 | 40.31% | 314,989 | 60,908 |
| 2020 | Nov. 3 | Ron Kind (inc) | Democratic | 199,870 | 51.30% | Derrick Van Orden | Rep. | 189,524 | 48.64% | 389,618 | 10,346 |

=== 2022 district boundaries (2022–2031) ===
| Year | Date | Elected | | | | Defeated | | | | Total | Plurality |
|---|---|---|---|---|---|---|---|---|---|---|---|
| 2022 | Nov. 8 | Derrick Van Orden | Republican | 164,743 | 51.82% | Brad Pfaff | Dem. | 152,977 | 48.12% | 317,922 | 11,766 |
| 2024 | Nov. 5 | Derrick Van Orden | Republican | 212,064 | 51.3% | Rebecca Cooke | Dem. | 200,808 | 48.6% | 413,181 | 11,256 |

== Recent election results from statewide races ==
| Year | Office | Results |
|---|---|---|
| 2008 | President | Obama 59–39% |
| 2010 | Senate | Johnson 50–48% |
| 2010 | Governor | Walker 51–47% |
| 2010 | Secretary of State | La Follette 53–47% |
| 2010 | Attorney General | Van Hollen 56–44% |
| 2010 | Treasurer | Schuller 51–49% |
| 2012 | President | Obama 56–44% |
| 2012 | Senate | Baldwin 53–44% |
| 2012 | Governor (recall) | Walker 52–47% |
| 2014 | Governor | Walker 50–48% |
| 2014 | Secretary of State | La Follette 52–44% |
| 2014 | Attorney General | Schimel 50–47% |
| 2014 | Treasurer | Sartori 47–46% |
| 2016 | President | Trump 49–44% |
| 2016 | Senate | Johnson 49–47% |
| 2018 | Senate | Baldwin 56–44% |
| 2018 | Governor | Evers 50–48% |
| 2018 | Secretary of State | La Follette 53–47% |
| 2018 | Attorney General | Kaul 50–48% |
| 2018 | Treasurer | Godlewski 51–46% |
| 2020 | President | Trump 51–47% |
| 2022 | Senate | Johnson 53–47% |
| 2022 | Governor | Evers 50–49% |
| 2022 | Secretary of State | Loudenbeck 50–46% |
| 2022 | Attorney General | Toney 50.4–49.5% |
| 2022 | Treasurer | Leiber 51–46% |
| 2024 | President | Trump 53–45% |
| 2024 | Senate | Hovde 51–47% |

== See also ==
- Wisconsin's congressional districts
- List of United States congressional districts
