= James William Murphy =

American politician

James W. Murphy
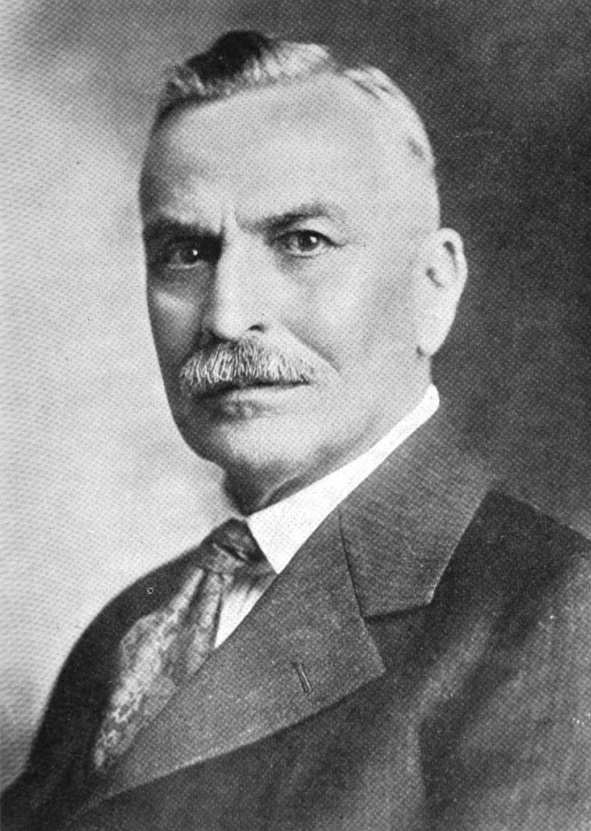
- From Volume 3 of 1932's Southwestern Wisconsin: A History of Old Crawford County

Member of the U.S. House of Representatives from Wisconsin's 3rd district
- In office March 4, 1907 – March 3, 1909
- Preceded by: Joseph W. Babcock
- Succeeded by: Arthur W. Kopp

Mayor of Platteville, Wisconsin
- In office April 19, 1904 – February 21, 1907
- Preceded by: Frank Spencer Knapp
- Succeeded by: Joseph E. Pross (acting)

District Attorney of Grant County, Wisconsin
- In office January 1, 1887 – January 1, 1891
- Preceded by: Robert C. Orr
- Succeeded by: Thomas L. Cleary

Personal details
- Born: April 17, 1858 Platteville, Wisconsin, U.S.
- Died: July 11, 1927 (aged 69) Mayo Clinic; Rochester, Minnesota, U.S.
- Resting place: Calvary Cemetery, Platteville, Wisconsin
- Party: Democratic; Republican (before 1900)
- Spouse: Elizabeth Jones (m. 1881–1927)
- Children: Catherine J. Murphy^{(b. 1884; died 1974)}; Loyola James Murphy^{(b. 1887; died 1968)}; John William Murphy^{(b. 1889; died 1979)}; Elizabeth Barbara Murphy^{(b. 1892; died 1970)}
- Education: Platteville State Normal School; University of Michigan Law School
- Profession: Lawyer

James William Murphy (April 17, 1858 – July 11, 1927) was an American lawyer and politician from Platteville, Wisconsin. He served one term in the U.S. House of Representatives, representing Wisconsin's 3rd congressional district for the 60th Congress (1907–1909). He previously served three years as mayor of Platteville and four years as district attorney of Grant County, Wisconsin. Originally a Republican, he quit the party in the 1890s over policy and personal reasons; he was elected mayor and member of Congress on the Democratic Party ticket. During his lifetime, his name was often abbreviated as J. W. Murphy, and appeared that way in nearly all of his advertisements as a lawyer; during the 1906 congressional election, his name was sometimes incorrectly printed as "John W. Murphy".

== Early life and career ==
James W. Murphy was born in Platteville, Wisconsin, in 1858. He graduated from the Platteville State Normal School (now the University of Wisconsin–Platteville) at age 14 and began studying law in the office of Archibald W. Bell. He finished his legal education at the University of Michigan Law School, earning his LL.B. in 1880.

He was admitted to the bar in Wisconsin in 1879 before completing his college education, and started a law practice in Platteville. He quickly became involved in politics, initially with the young Republicans in Grant County. In 1884, he became town clerk of Platteville.

== Political career ==
In 1886, he received the Republican Party nomination for district attorney of Grant County. He won the election in 1886, and won re-election in 1888.

In 1890, Murphy launched a challenge against incumbent U.S. representative Robert M. La Follette for the Republican nomination in Wisconsin's 3rd congressional district. He collected a majority of delegates from his home county, but La Follette arrived at the nominating convention with an overwhelming delegate majority from the rest of the district, and was renominated by acclamation.

In the following years, Murphy was elected to represent Platteville on the Grant County board of supervisors, but in 1894, Murphy's Catholic faith became an issue within the Republican Party of Grant County due to agitation from the American Protective Association; he was dropped from the Republican slate of supervisor candidates in the 1894 election.

Over the next several years, Murphy excused himself from political activity, and focused on his legal practice and civic affairs; in the latter half of the decade, he was appointed city attorney of Platteville by the city council. During this time, he also expanded his business interests into the mining industry in southwest Wisconsin. He was one of the organizers of the Platteville Lead and Zinc Co., which operated one of the first zinc mines in the Platteville area.

In September 1900, Murphy was noted as attending a Grant County Democratic Party convention. During this time, Murphy became outspoken against American imperialism and the concentration of wealth and economic power in the hands of a few wealthy elite, publicly declaring himself for the national Democratic Party platform. Murphy returned to electoral politics in 1901, running for county supervisor on the Democratic Party ticket; he lost the general election to Republican A. L. Brown.

In 1904, Murphy was the Democratic nominee for mayor of Platteville; he defeated Republican candidate Orville Eastman, receiving nearly 66% of the vote. That fall, he was also nominated for Wisconsin State Assembly in Grant County's 1st Assembly district, but narrowly lost the general election to Republican Duncan McGregor. Murphy was re-elected as mayor in 1906, facing no opponent in the election.

=== Congress (1906–1909) ===
Wisconsin's 3rd congressional district 1902–1911

That summer, Murphy launched another campaign for U.S. House of Representatives in Wisconsin's 3rd congressional district, hoping to challenge seven-term incumbent Republican Joseph W. Babcock. County conventions held through the summer endorsed his candidacy, and he faced no opponent for the Democratic nomination. In accepting the nomination, Murphy struck a populist tone, saying that he hoped to be part of a majority that could enact anti-monopoly laws and challenge the power of money in politics. 1906 was a strong year, nationally, for the Democratic Party, and Murphy defeated Babcock by 1,000 votes.

After winning a seat in Congress, Murphy resigned as mayor in February 1907. He served in the 60th U.S. Congress, from March 4, 1907, to March 3, 1909. Although they fared well in the election, Democrats did not secure a majority in either chamber of Congress, and Murphy's service was mostly inconsequential.

Within months of the start of the congressional term in 1907, multiple Republicans announced their intention to challenge Murphy in the 1908 congressional election, including state senator Oliver Munson and Vernon county judge Daniel O. Mahoney. Ultimately, the Republican nominee in 1908 was fellow Platteville lawyer Arthur W. Kopp; Kopp had also served as city attorney of Platteville while Murphy was mayor. In the higher turnout presidential election year, Murphy was soundly beaten, receiving only 41% of the vote.

== Later years ==
After the expiration of his term in Congress, Murphy was less active in civic affairs and politics, devoting most of his attention to his law practice in Platteville and his mining interests. During that time, he was also elected an officer of the State Bar of Wisconsin.

He made a brief return to overt political activity in 1912, supporting the Democratic presidential candidacy of Champ Clark, and served as a delegate to the 1912 Democratic National Convention on Clark's behalf. Clark lost out to Woodrow Wilson at the convention, and that summer Murphy briefly entertained a run for governor of Wisconsin, securing the support of the Grant County delegation to the state convention, but he was not nominated. After 1912, Murphy again returned to political hibernation, not commenting on the 1916 elections.

Wisconsin's 3rd congressional district 1912–1931

When the U.S. entered World War I in 1917, Murphy offered his services to the government; he was not appointed to any role but was active in local patriotic organizations supporting Wilson's war policies, and raised funds for the American Red Cross.

In 1920, Murphy made his final bid for public office, running again for Congress in the 3rd congressional district; he faced no opposition for the Democratic nomination. The district had been significantly reshaped since Murphy's previous runs, and was now anchored by the vote-heavy Dane County. The incumbent, James G. Monahan, was defeated in the Republican primary by former U.S. representative John M. Nelson of Dane County. The 1920 election was a Republican landslide; Murphy lost badly, receiving just 31% of the vote.

Murphy continued working at his legal practice up until his death. Suffering from intestinal problems in 1927, he traveled to the Mayo Clinic in Rochester, Minnesota, for surgery. He never left the hospital; his condition declined over the next month and he died there on July 11, 1927.

== Personal life and family ==
James William Murphy was the only known child of Irish American immigrants William Murphy (1829–1901) and Catherine (née O'Sullivan; 1822–1904). His parents were married in Ireland and emigrated to the United States in the 1850s, settling in Grant County, Wisconsin, before James' birth. Throughout his life, Murphy was active in Irish American and Catholic civic groups and activities, including the Knights of Columbus. He was a supporter of the Wisconsin Mining Trade School and the Platteville Normal School.

James Murphy married Elizabeth "Bessie" Jones on November 16, 1881. They had four children together, all of whom survived them.

Their younger son, John William Murphy (sometimes referred to as "J. W. Jr." or "Will"), also became a lawyer and partnered with his father in a firm known as Murphy & Murphy in the 1910s and 1920s. He served briefly in the United States Army during World War I, but was never deployed overseas.

== Electoral history ==
=== Platteville Mayor (1904, 1906) ===
Year	Election	Date	Elected				Defeated				Total	Plurality
1904	General	Apr. 5	James W. Murphy	Democratic	533	65.88%	Orville A. Eastman	Rep.	276	34.12%	809	257
1906	General	Apr. 3	James W. Murphy (inc)	Democratic	478	98.96%	--Unopposed--				483	

=== Wisconsin Assembly (1904) ===
Year	Election	Date	Elected				Defeated				Total	Plurality
1904	General	Nov. 8	Duncan McGregor	Republican	2,193	50.38%	James W. Murphy	Dem.	2,095	48.13%	4,353	98
1904	General	Nov. 8	Duncan McGregor	Republican	2,193	50.38%	J. N. McLoed	Proh.	65	1.49%	4,353	98

=== U.S. House (1906, 1908) ===
Year	Election	Date	Elected				Defeated				Total	Plurality
1906	General	Nov. 6	James W. Murphy	Democratic	14,701	50.09%	Joseph W. Babcock (inc)	Rep.	13,690	46.64%	29,352	1,011
1906	General	Nov. 6	James W. Murphy	Democratic	14,701	50.09%	Herbert J. Noyes	Proh.	934	3.18%	29,352	1,011
1908	General	Nov. 3	Arthur W. Kopp	Republican	21,409	55.76%	James W. Murphy (inc)	Dem.	16,010	41.70%	38,397	5,399
1908	General	Nov. 3	Arthur W. Kopp	Republican	21,409	55.76%	John Hardcastle	Proh.	918	2.39%	38,397	5,399
1908	General	Nov. 3	Arthur W. Kopp	Republican	21,409	55.76%	E. A. Ketterer	Soc.D.	56	0.15%	38,397	5,399

=== U.S. House (1920) ===
Year	Election	Date	Elected				Defeated				Total	Plurality
1920	General	Nov. 2	John M. Nelson	Republican	44,359	69.11%	James W. Murphy	Dem.	19,794	30.84%	64,185	24,565

U.S. House of Representatives
Preceded by Joseph W. Babcock	Member of the U.S. House of Representatives from Wisconsin's 3rd congressional district March 4, 1907 - March 3, 1909	Succeeded by Arthur W. Kopp
Political offices
Preceded by Frank Spencer Knapp	Mayor of Platteville, Wisconsin; April 19, 1904 – February 21, 1907	Succeeded by Joseph E. Pross (acting)
