= Joseph W. Babcock =

American politician (1850–1909)

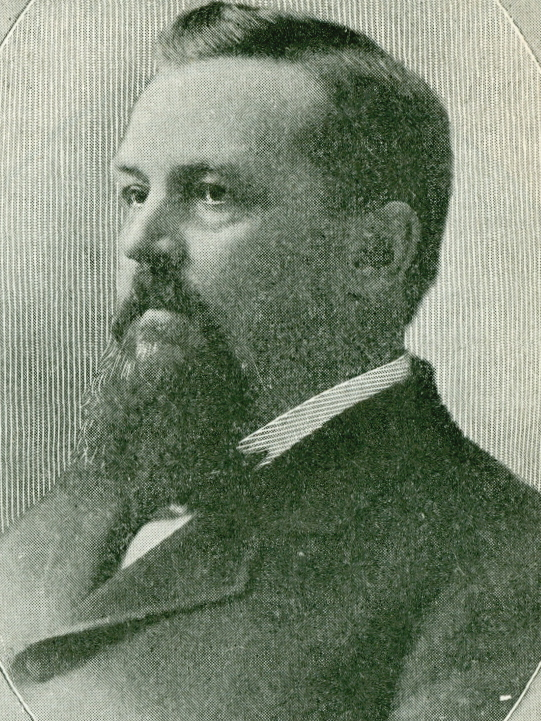

Member of the U.S. House of Representatives from Wisconsin's 3rd district
- In office March 4, 1893 – March 3, 1907
- Preceded by: Allen R. Bushnell
- Succeeded by: James William Murphy

Member of the Wisconsin State Assembly from the Juneau County district
- In office January 7, 1889 – January 2, 1893
- Preceded by: John Grimshaw
- Succeeded by: W. Peter Wheelihan

Personal details
- Born: March 6, 1850 Swanton, Vermont, U.S.
- Died: April 27, 1909 (aged 59) Washington, D.C., U.S.
- Resting place: Rock Creek Cemetery, Washington, D.C.
- Party: Republican
- Spouses: Mary A. Finch (died 1899); Kate Woodman (m. 1901–1909)
- Children: Amelia Martha (Reed)^{(adopted; b. 1868; died after 1904)}; Charles Ebenezer Babcock^{(b. 1868; died 1926)}; George Woodman Babcock^{(adopted; b. 1898; died 1973)}
- Relatives: Joseph Weeks (grandfather)
- Occupation: Lumber businessman

Joseph Weeks Babcock (March 6, 1850 – April 27, 1909) was an American lumber businessman and Republican politician from central Wisconsin. He served seven terms in the U.S. House of Representatives, representing Wisconsin's 3rd congressional district from 1893 to 1907. He served as chairman of the National Republican Congressional Committee in 1894—which saw the Republicans returned to the U.S. House majority—and he was then retained as chairman for the 1896, 1898, and 1900 elections.

Before serving in Congress, he served two terms in the Wisconsin State Assembly (1889–1893). He is the namesake of Babcock, Wisconsin. His maternal grandfather and namesake was Joseph Weeks, who served as a U.S. representative from New Hampshire in the 1830s.

== Biography ==
Born in Swanton, Vermont. He was of "old Yankee stock" ancestry, as he put it, descending entirely from English migrants who came to New England as Puritans during the Puritan migration to New England (1620–1640). He grew up in Butler County, Iowa, where he started his lumber career working at his father's lumberyard. In 1881 he moved to Necedah, Wisconsin, where he amassed a fortune during his 17 years as manager and secretary of the Necedah Lumber Company, and served in the Wisconsin State Assembly from 1888 to 1892.

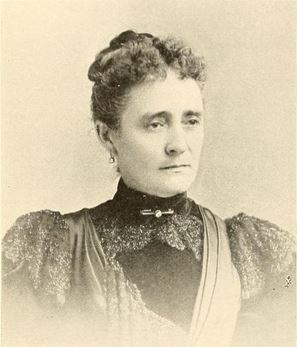
Mary Finch

He married Mary Finch, a native of Clinton, Iowa, and the daughter of C. C. Finch. They resided for many years in Necedah, Wisconsin, where Babcock was in the lumber business. They had a son, Charles, and a daughter, Amelia. The Babcocks owned a residence on Capitol Hill facing the capitol grounds.

In 1892, Babcock was elected to the 53rd United States Congress from Wisconsin's 3rd congressional district and was reelected to the six subsequent congresses as well serving from March 4, 1893, till March 3, 1907. In 1893, he helped organize the Republican Congressional Campaign Committee; he was credited with helping achieve Republican successes in the 1894 House elections, and was chairman of the committee for the next ten years. He was a candidate for Speaker of the House in 1902, but lost to Joseph Cannon. He was defeated for reelection in 1906 by Democrat James William Murphy. Speeches on "History of Money and Financial Legislature in the United States" and "Three Evenings with Silver and Money" were published in pamphlet form by him in 1896.

He continued to live in Washington, D.C., where in 1909 he died at the age of 59 after suffering for several weeks from liver and kidney problems.

U.S. House of Representatives
Preceded by Allen R. Bushnell	Member of the U.S. House of Representatives from Wisconsin's 3rd congressional district March 4, 1893 – March 3, 1907	Succeeded by James William Murphy
