= H. J. Mortensen =

American politician (1886–1970)

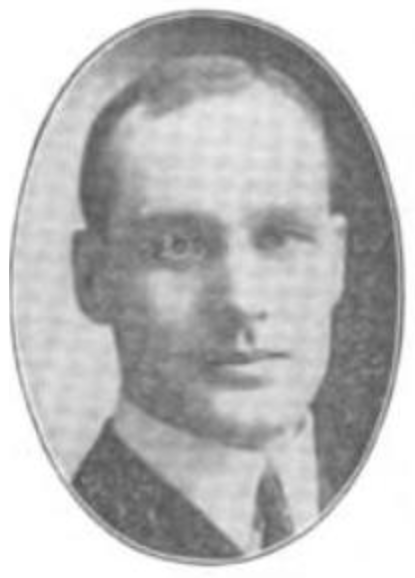

Member of the Wisconsin State Assembly
- In office 1908–1910
- Constituency: Juneau County

Personal details
- Born: September 18, 1876 Fountain, Wisconsin
- Died: July 24, 1970 (aged 93) New Lisbon, Wisconsin
- Party: Republican
- Spouse: Carolyn Balgord (m. 1906; died 1953)
- Education: University of Wisconsin-Stevens Point; University of Wisconsin Law School
- Occupation: Lawyer, politician

Harry J. Mortensen (September 18, 1876 – July 24, 1970) was a member of the Wisconsin State Assembly.

== Biography ==
Mortensen was born on September 18, 1876, in Fountain, Wisconsin. He graduated from what is now the University of Wisconsin-Stevens Point in 1898 and the University of Wisconsin Law School in 1902.

He was married to Carolyn Balgord from 1906 until her death in 1953.

Mortensen died on July 24, 1970. He was buried in New Lisbon, Wisconsin.

== Career ==
Mortensen was elected to the Assembly in 1908. Additionally, he was City Attorney of New Lisbon, District Attorney of Juneau County, Wisconsin, and the Wisconsin Commissioner of Insurance. He was a Republican.
