= James Monahan =

James Monahan may refer to:

- James G. Monahan (1855–1923), U.S. Representative from Wisconsin
- James Henry Monahan (1803–1878), Irish judge

== See also ==
- Erwin James (Erwin James Monahan, born 1957), British prisoner and journalist
