= Harold G. Bradbury =

Rear admiral in the US Coast Guard

Harold G. Bradbury (May 30, 1899 – April 16, 1984) was a rear admiral in the United States Coast Guard.

== Biography ==
Bradbury was born on May 30, 1899, in Necedah, Wisconsin. He graduated from high school in Port Angeles, Washington, before attending Oregon State University. Bradbury married Helen Hutchinson on January 6, 1953.

== Career ==
Bradbury entered the United States Coast Guard Academy in 1918 and received his commission in 1920. He later served aboard the USCGC Acushnet, the USS Henley (DD-39) and the USS Trippe (DD-33).

In 1928, Bradbury assumed command of the USCGC Apache. He remained in the position until 1930. After serving as executive officer of the USCGC Northland (WPG-49), he assumed command of the USS Davis (DD-65). Bradbury then served as an instructor at the Coast Guard Academy from 1933 until 1937, at which time he was named commanding officer of the USCGC Modoc (WPG-46).

During World War II, Bradbury commanded the USS Leonard Wood (APA-12), the USS Wakefield (AP-21) and the USCGC Duane (WPG-33). He was later stationed in Australia from 1943 to 1945, during which time he was awarded the Bronze Star Medal.
