= Frank M. Reed =

American politician

Frank M. Reed was a member of the Wisconsin State Assembly.

== Biography ==
Reed was born on February 19, 1861, in Necedah, Wisconsin.

== Career ==
Reed was elected to the Assembly in 1902. Additionally, he served as Chairman (Similar to Mayor) of Necedah and Clerk of the School Board of Necedah. He was a Republican.
