= John Kingston Jr. =

American politician

John Tabor Kingston Jr. (January 4, 1860 – August 26, 1898) was a member of the Wisconsin State Senate during the 1891 and 1893 sessions.

Kingston, a native of Necedah, Wisconsin, represented the 11th district as a Democrat. After concluding his political career, he served in the United States Army during the Spanish–American War. Shortly after the war, Kingston died of peritonitis or typhoid fever on August 26, 1898, in Coamo, Puerto Rico where he was buried.
