= Necedah Airport =

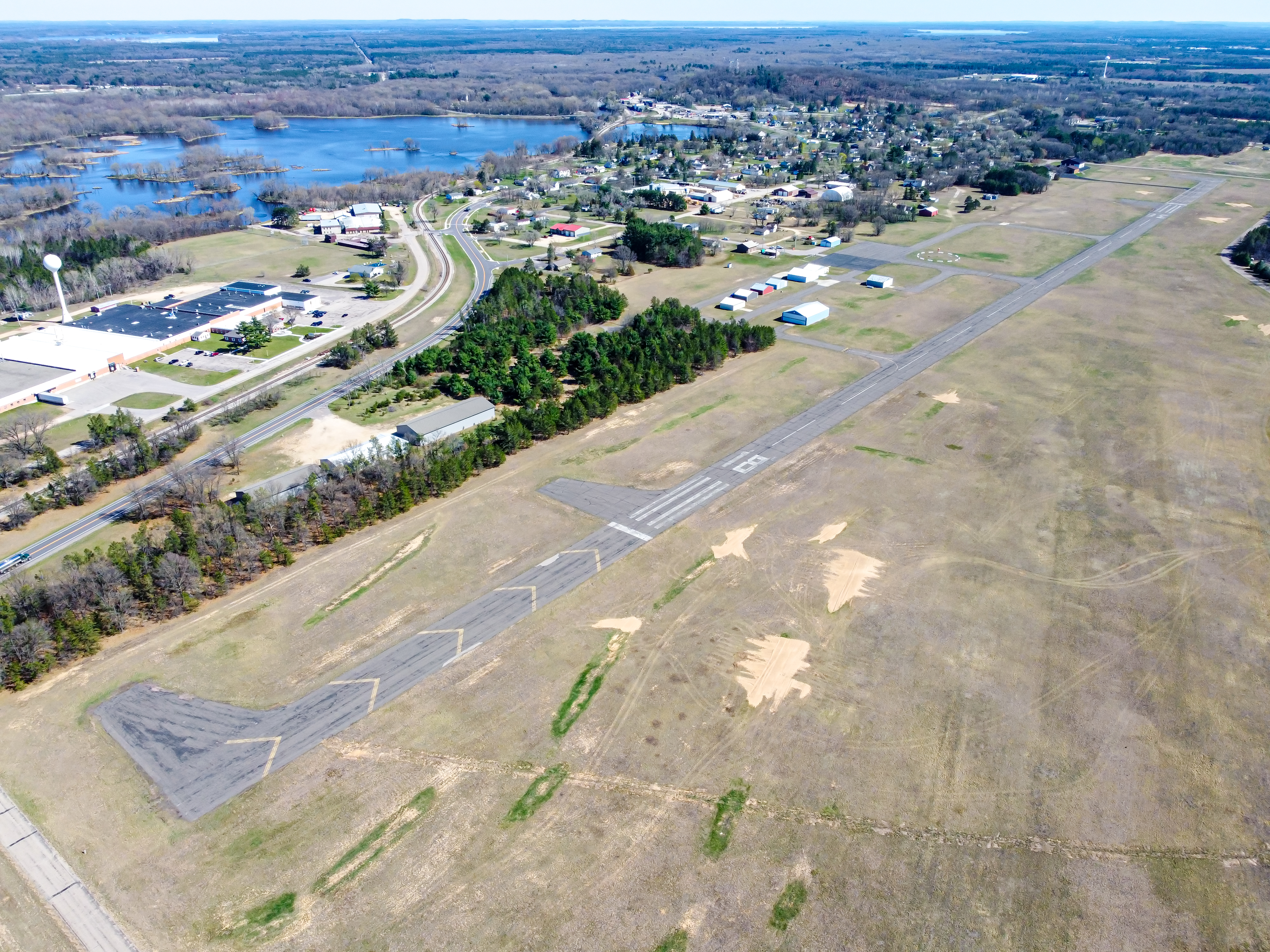
- IATA: none; ICAO: KDAF; FAA LID: DAF

Summary
- Airport type: Public
- Owner: Village of Necedah
- Serves: Necedah, Wisconsin
- Opened: December 1965
- Time zone: CST (UTC−06:00)
  - Summer (DST): CDT (UTC−05:00)
- Elevation AMSL: 919 ft / 280 m
- Coordinates: 44°02′00″N 90°05′06″W

Map
- Location of airport in Wisconsin DAF (the United States)

Runways
Direction	Length		Surface
Direction	ft	m	Surface
18/36	2,721	829	Asphalt

Statistics
- Aircraft operations (2022): 8,950
- Based aircraft (2024): 9
- Source: Federal Aviation Administration

Necedah Airport (ICAO: KDAF, FAA LID: DAF) is a public use airport located one nautical mile (2 km) northwest of the central business district of Necedah, a village in Juneau County, Wisconsin, United States. It is owned by the Village of Necedah.

Although many U.S. airports use the same three-letter location identifier for the FAA and the IATA, this facility is assigned DAF by the FAA but has no designation from the IATA. The IATA has assigned the code DAF to Daup Airport in Daup, Papua New Guinea.

== Facilities and aircraft ==
Necedah Airport covers an area of 93 acres (38 ha) at an elevation of 919 feet (280 m) above mean sea level. It has one runway, designated 18/36, with an asphalt surface measuring 2,721 by 60 feet (829 by 18 m).

For the 12-month period ending June 29, 2022, the airport had 8,950 aircraft operations, an average of 24 per day: 99% general aviation and 1% air taxi. In August 2024, there were 9 aircraft based at this airport: all 9 single-engine.

== See also ==
- List of airports in Wisconsin
