= Byron C. Nelson =

American creationist (1893–1972)

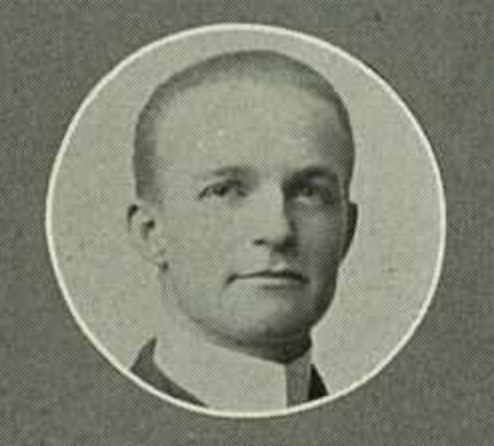
Byron C. Nelson, c. 1915.

Byron Christopher Nelson (December 23, 1893 – January 2, 1972) was an American Lutheran pastor and an early apologist for creationism.

== Early life and education ==
Byron Nelson was the second of six children born in Madison, Wisconsin to Thea Johnanna Stondahl Nelson and John Mandt Nelson, a U.S. Representative from Wisconsin, who served nine terms in Congress between 1913 and 1933. Byron Nelson's youth was therefore divided between Washington, D.C. and the family home in Madison, where he excelled in athletics and enjoyed oil painting. He graduated from Madison Central High School in 1912 and then attended George Washington University, where he was encouraged by Harriet Earhart Monroe to enter the ministry.

After returning to Madison and attending the University of Wisconsin, Nelson was approaching graduation in the spring of 1917 when the United States declared war on Germany. His father, an opponent of the war, urged Nelson to move to Alberta, Canada, where the family owned a 1,300 acre wheat farm. There Byron married his childhood sweetheart, Anita Valentine Pleuss, at a small Lutheran church in Lethbridge, Alberta.

Nelson's quasi-evasion of the draft created a windfall for his father's political opponents. Both father and son were indicted for conspiracy, and Byron was also indicted for failure to register for the draft. At trial, on January 3, 1918, the indictments were quashed and the case was thrown out of court. Nevertheless, the congressman lost the Republican primary, and the son felt constrained to enter the Army. He was eventually sent to France. Byron Nelson later said that suffering "severe social condemnation" taught him "not to care for the praise of men or fear their faces or their ridicule."

Nelson's war service seems to have permanently damaged his health, leaving him with nerve damage and hearing loss. After returning to the Alberta farm in 1919, his father encouraged him to continue preparing for the ministry. In 1922, Nelson graduated from Luther Theological Seminary in Saint Paul, Minnesota. Though he briefly pastored a church in Spokane, Washington, in 1925, he matriculated at Princeton Theological Seminary and the following year earned a Th.M degree.

== Creationism ==
While pastoring Our Savior's Danish Lutheran Church in Perth Amboy, New Jersey, Nelson attended classes in genetics and zoology at Rutgers University, striking up a friendship with the evolutionist professor. Nelson even considered abandoning the ministry to become a biology teacher. Instead, he wrote a book based on his Th.M. thesis, "After Its Kind": The First and Last Word on Evolution (1927). In 1931, inspired by Seventh-day Adventist writer George McCready Price, Nelson published The Deluge Story in Stone: A History of the Flood Theory of Geology with Augsburg Publishing House in Minneapolis, which kept periodic revisions of the work in print until the 1960s. Nelson illustrated his own books.

Nelson first came to the attention of a wider public when he criticized a sixth-grade textbook that his daughter had brought home from the Perth Amboy public schools, V. M. Hillyer, A Child's History of the World (New York: D. Appleton-Century Company, 1934), which suggested that early man had hair all over their bodies "like shaggy dogs" and communicated with grunts like "Unfa, unfa, glug, glug." Time magazine and the New York City newspapers picked up the story, making "weak attempts at humor using the 'glug, glug' dialect of Hillyer's primitives." After the Perth Amboy superintendent of schools withdrew the book, Roger Baldwin of the American Civil Liberties Union threatened to contest the removal in court, though nothing came of the threat.

In 1933 the Nelson family, including their four children, returned to Madison, where Byron resumed studies at the University of Wisconsin, concentrating on glacial geology and philosophy. He also pastored two small Lutheran churches in Stone Bank and Toland in the Oconomowoc Lake region of Wisconsin. In 1935, Nelson, Price, and the rancher-journalist Dudley Joseph Whitney founded the Religion and Science Association, hoping to convert fundamentalists to flood geology, but the creationists were so divided among themselves that the society's first meeting in 1936 was also its last.

From 1933 on, Nelson concerned himself with the question of glaciation and human antiquity, arguing that man could not "possibly be less than 40 or 50 thousand years old....maybe twice that." A manuscript taking this position languished in the Augsburg Committee on Publication, and its printing was further delayed by the coming of World War II. After Nelson wrote an essay arguing that Hitler had justified Nazi aggression on evolutionary principles, Nelson reentered the U.S. Army in 1943, this time as a chaplain. He served at Fort Knox for the remainder of the war and thereafter for a few months on trans-Atlantic troop transports.

Following his discharge, Nelson enrolled at the University of Wisconsin classes for courses in glacial geology and archaeology while continuing to lobby for publication of his manuscript. In December 1946, the Augsburg committee finally approved the manuscript, which was published as Before Abraham: Prehistoric Man in Biblical Light. Simultaneously he accepted his final call to pastor Lutheran churches in Spooner and Minong, Wisconsin.

By the 1950s, Nelson's "creationist writing and research dropped off sharply," and he spent more time oil painting and landscaping a house in Madison that he had inherited from his father. Nelson made a complete revision of Before Abraham, but could not interest a publisher. Furthermore, his health was declining, a series of strokes having affected his speech and memory. By the late 1960s, Nelson needed assistance to move about his house, and after breaking a hip, he was relegated to a series of nursing homes. He died on January 2, 1972, at the age of 79, and was buried in Forest Hill Cemetery in Madison.

== Works ==
- "After Its Kind": The First and Last Word on Evolution (Minneapolis: Augsburg Publishing House, 1927).
- The Deluge in Stone: A History of the Flood Theory of Geology (Minneapolis: Augsburg Publishing House, 1931).
- Before Abraham: Prehistoric Man in Biblical Light (Minneapolis: Augsburg Publishing House, 1948).

All three books have been republished as Paul Nelson, ed., The Creationist Writings of Byron C. Nelson, Vol. 5 of Ronald L. Numbers, Creationism in Twentieth-Century America: A Ten-Volume Anthology of Documents, 1903-1961 (New York: Garland Publishing, Inc., 1995) ISBN 0-8153-1806-5
