= Arthur W. Kopp =

American politician (1874–1967)

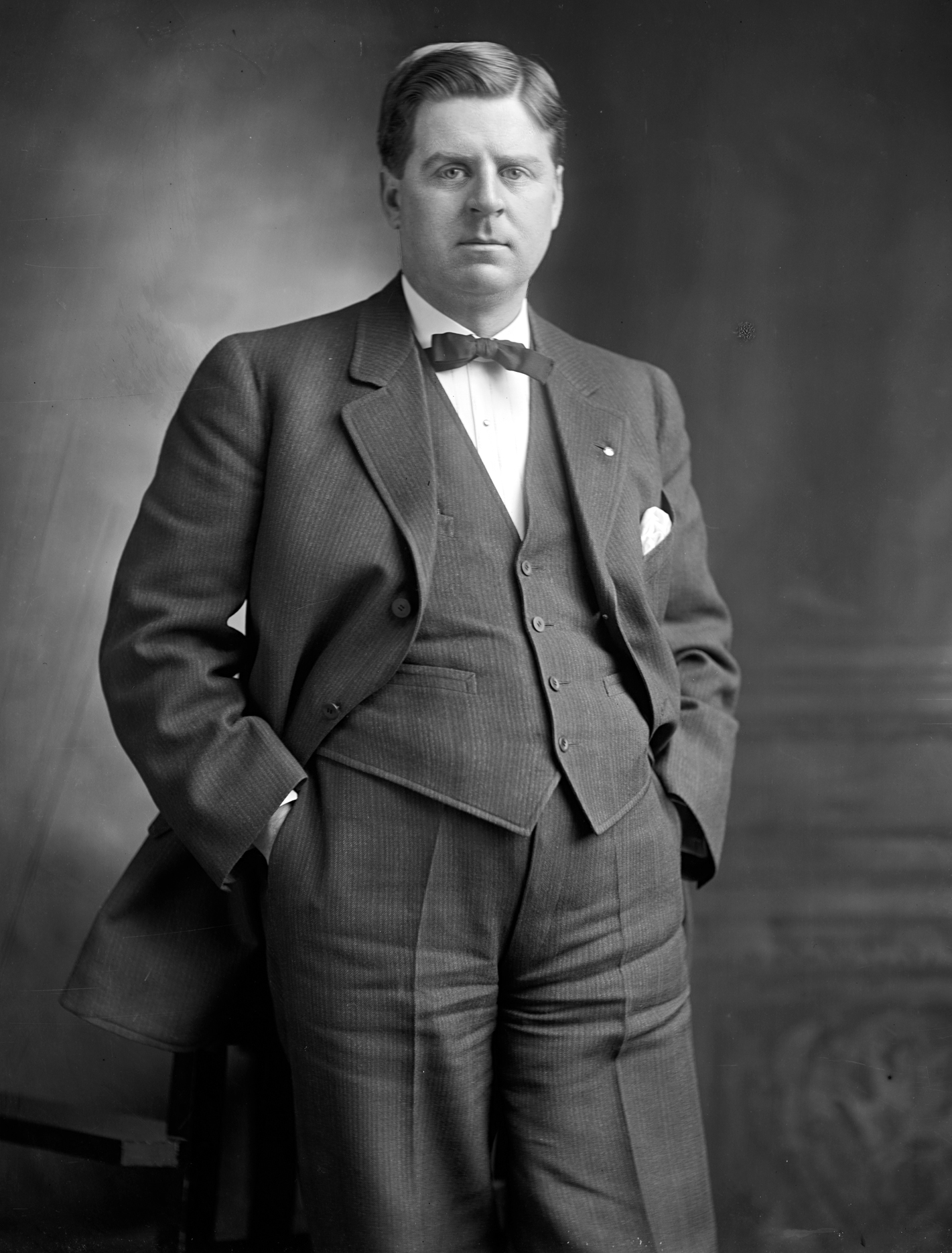

Wisconsin Circuit Court Judge for the 5th Circuit
- In office January 1, 1943 – January 1, 1955
- Preceded by: Sherman E. Smalley
- Succeeded by: Richard W. Orton

Member of the U.S. House of Representatives from Wisconsin's 3rd district
- In office March 4, 1909 – March 3, 1913
- Preceded by: James William Murphy
- Succeeded by: John M. Nelson

District Attorney of Grant County, Wisconsin
- In office January 1, 1905 – January 1, 1909
- Preceded by: Henry W. Brown
- Succeeded by: G. B. Clementson

Personal details
- Born: February 28, 1874 Bigpatch, Wisconsin, U.S.
- Died: June 2, 1967 (aged 93) Platteville, Wisconsin, U.S.
- Resting place: Greenwood Cemetery, Platteville
- Party: Republican
- Spouse: Emily Katharine Hutton (m. 1902; died 1955)
- Children: William Roy Kopp^{(b. 1905; died 2003)}; Emily E. Kopp^{(b. 1912; died 1999)}
- Profession: Lawyer

Arthur William Kopp (February 28, 1874 – June 2, 1967) was an American lawyer and Republican politician from Platteville, Wisconsin. He served two terms in the U.S. House of Representatives, representing Wisconsin's 3rd congressional district for the 61st and 62nd congresses (1909–1913). Before his election to Congress, he served four years as district attorney of Grant County, Wisconsin; later in life, he served as a Wisconsin circuit court judge (1943–1955).

== Biography ==
Born in Bigpatch, Wisconsin, Kopp attended the common schools of Grant County, Wisconsin. He graduated from the State normal school, now the University of Wisconsin–Platteville in Platteville, Wisconsin, in 1895. He taught school for three years. He graduated from the law department of the University of Wisconsin–Madison in 1900, and was admitted to the bar the same year and commenced practice in Platteville, Grant County. He served as member of the board of aldermen in Platteville from 1903 till 1904, and was the city attorney in 1903 and 1904. He served as district attorney of Grant County from 1904 to 1908.

Kopp was elected as a Republican to the Sixty-first and Sixty-second Congresses (March 4, 1909 - March 3, 1913) representing Wisconsin's 3rd congressional district. He was not a candidate for reelection to the Sixty-third Congress. After congress he resumed the practice of law.

Kopp was elected circuit judge of the fifth judicial district of Wisconsin in 1942 and served until his retirement January 1, 1955. He was a reserve circuit judge after retirement, accepting occasional assignments. He was also a law consultant.

He died in Platteville, Wisconsin, on June 2, 1967. He was interred in Greenwood Cemetery.

== Sources ==
U.S. House of Representatives
Preceded by James William Murphy	Member of the U.S. House of Representatives from Wisconsin's 3rd congressional district March 4, 1909 - March 4, 1913	Succeeded by John M. Nelson
