= Orange, Wisconsin =

- Town
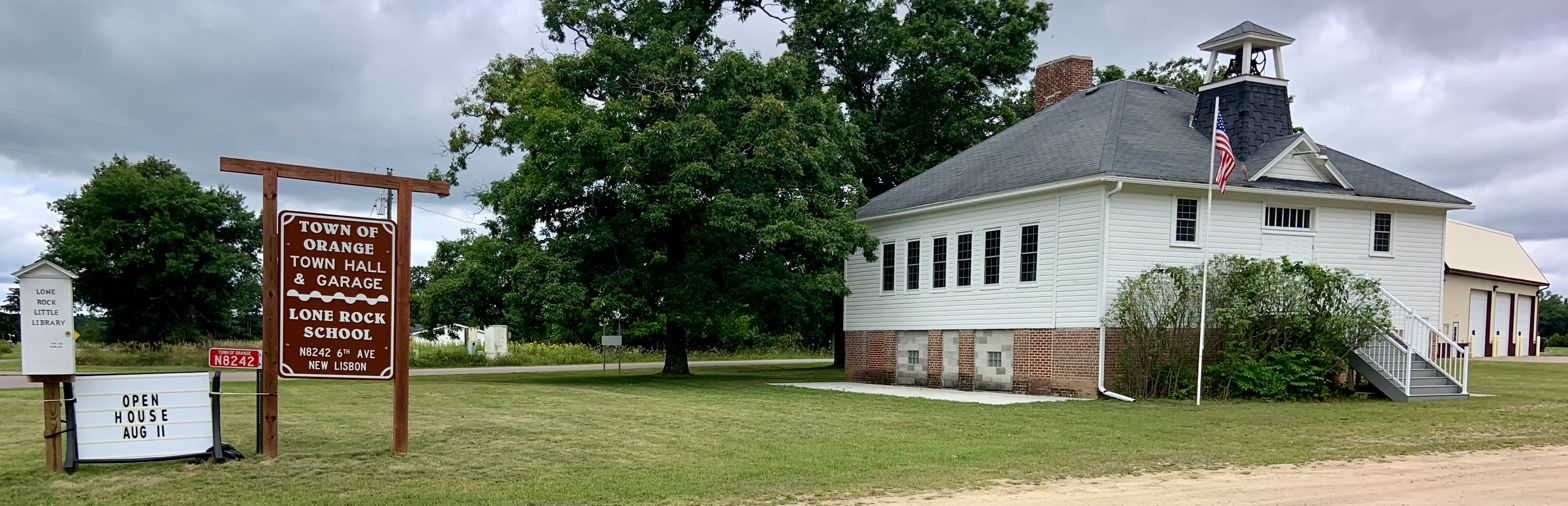
- Town hall

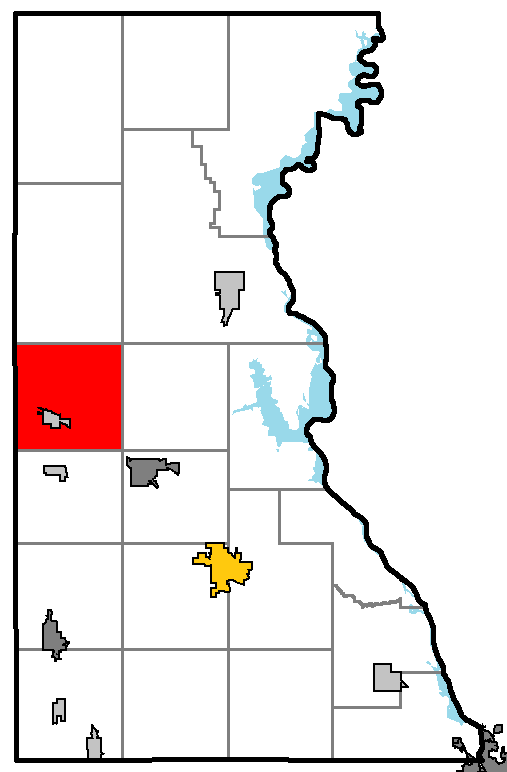
- Location of Orange, Juneau County

- Location of Juneau County, Wisconsin
- Coordinates: 43°55′42″N 90°15′9″W
- Country: United States
- State: Wisconsin
- County: Juneau

Area
  - Total: 35 sq mi (91 km^{2})
  - Land: 35 sq mi (91 km^{2})
  - Water: 0 sq mi (0 km^{2})
- Elevation: 899 ft (274 m)

Population (2020)
  - Total: 540
  - Density: 15/sq mi (5.9/km^{2})
- Time zone: UTC-6 (Central (CST))
  - Summer (DST): UTC-5 (CDT)
- Area code: 608
- FIPS code: 55-60150
- GNIS feature ID: 1583866
- Website: https://www.townorange.com/

Orange is a town in Juneau County, Wisconsin, United States. The population was 540 at the 2020 census. The unincorporated communities of Lone Rock and Orange Mill are located in the town.

== Geography ==
According to the United States Census Bureau, the town has a total area of 35.1 square miles (91 km^{2}), of which 35.1 square miles (91 km^{2}) is land and 0.03% is water.

== Demographics ==
As of the census of 2000, there were 549 people, 221 households, and 154 families residing in the town. The population density was 15.6 people per square mile (6/km^{2}). There were 261 housing units at an average density of 7.4 per square mile (2.9/km^{2}). The racial makeup of the town was 99.27% White, 0.36% from other races, and 0.36% from two or more races. Hispanic or Latino people of any race were 0.91% of the population.

There were 221 households, out of which 24.4% had children under the age of 18 living with them, 58.8% were married couples living together, 3.6% had a female householder with no husband present, and 29.9% were non-families. 23.1% of all households were made up of individuals, and 12.2% had someone living alone who was 65 years of age or older. The average household size was 2.48 and the average family size was 2.94.

In the town, the population was spread out, with 23.9% under the age of 18, 6.2% from 18 to 24, 24.2% from 25 to 44, 28.2% from 45 to 64, and 17.5% who were 65 years of age or older. The median age was 42 years. For every 100 females, there were 103.3 males. For every 100 females age 18 and over, there were 113.3 males.

The median income for a household in the town was $35,909, and the median income for a family was $38,438. Males had a median income of $30,313 versus $20,000 for females. The per capita income for the town was $17,788. About 9.7% of families and 15.2% of the population were below the poverty line, including 29.9% of those under age 18 and 6.9% of those age 65 or over.
