= Lindina, Wisconsin =

Town of Lindina, Wisconsin
- Town
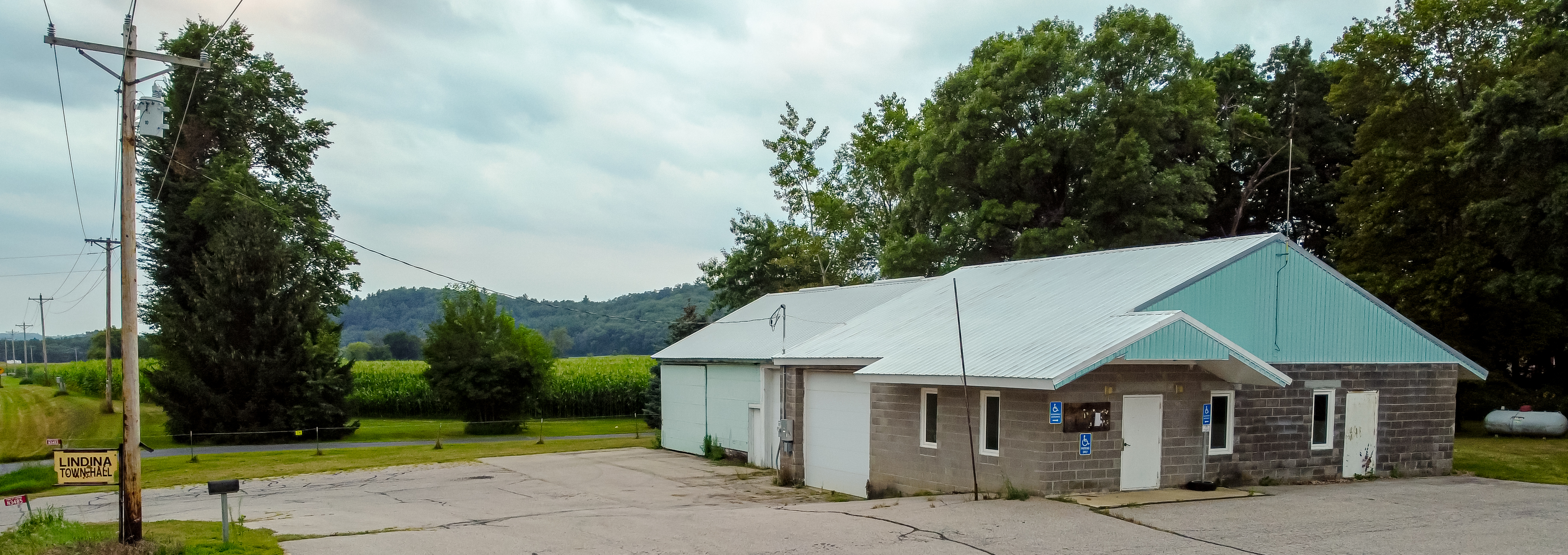
- Town hall

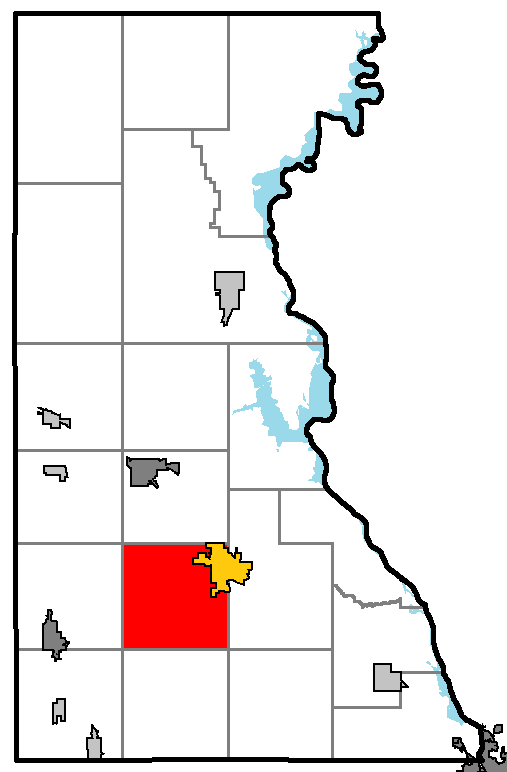
- Location of the Town of Lindina, Juneau County

- Location of Juneau County, Wisconsin
- Coordinates: 43°47′4″N 90°8′5″W
- Country: United States
- State: Wisconsin
- County: Juneau

Area
  - Total: 33.1 sq mi (85.7 km^{2})
  - Land: 33.1 sq mi (85.7 km^{2})
  - Water: 0 sq mi (0 km^{2})
- Elevation: 978 ft (298 m)

Population (2020)
  - Total: 685
  - Density: 20.7/sq mi (7.99/km^{2})
- Time zone: UTC-6 (Central (CST))
  - Summer (DST): UTC-5 (CDT)
- Area code: 608
- FIPS code: 55-44675
- GNIS feature ID: 1583575
- Website: https://townoflindina.wi.gov/

The Town of Lindina is in Juneau County, Wisconsin, United States. The population was 685 at the 2020 census.

== Geography ==
According to the United States Census Bureau, the town has a total area of 33.1 square miles (85.8 km^{2}), all land.

== Demographics ==
As of the census of 2000, there were 730 people, 263 households, and 199 families residing in the town. The population density was 22 people per square mile (8.5/km^{2}). There were 287 housing units at an average density of 8.7 per square mile (3.3/km^{2}). The racial makeup of the town was 98.63% White, 0.41% African American, 0.27% Asian, 0.14% from other races, and 0.55% from two or more races. Hispanic or Latino people of any race were 0.55% of the population.

There were 263 households, out of which 37.3% had children under the age of 18 living with them, 67.7% were married couples living together, 3.8% had a female householder with no husband present, and 24% were non-families. 19.8% of all households were made up of individuals, and 10.6% had someone living alone who was 65 years of age or older. The average household size was 2.78 and the average family size was 3.2.

In the town, the population was spread out, with 30.4% under the age of 18, 4.8% from 18 to 24, 24.9% from 25 to 44, 24.9% from 45 to 64, and 14.9% who were 65 years of age or older. The median age was 38 years. For every 100 females, there were 102.8 males. For every 100 females age 18 and over, there were 99.2 males.

The median income for a household in the town was $41,250, and the median income for a family was $44,792. Males had a median income of $29,286 versus $21,406 for females. The per capita income for the town was $16,047. About 5.3% of families and 7.3% of the population were below the poverty line, including 8.1% of those under age 18 and 8% of those age 65 or over.
