= Marion, Juneau County, Wisconsin =

Marion, Wisconsin
- Town
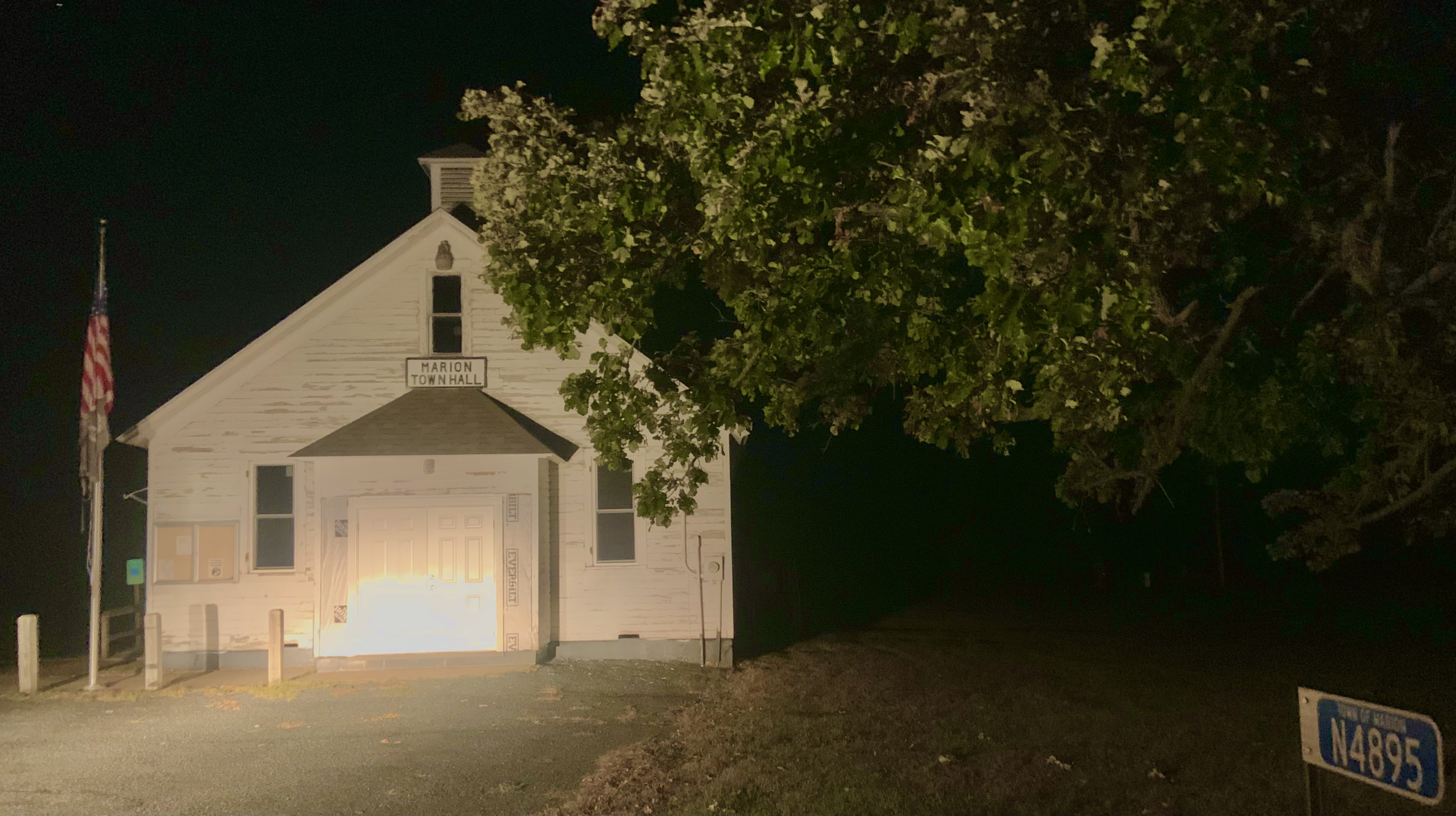
- Town hall

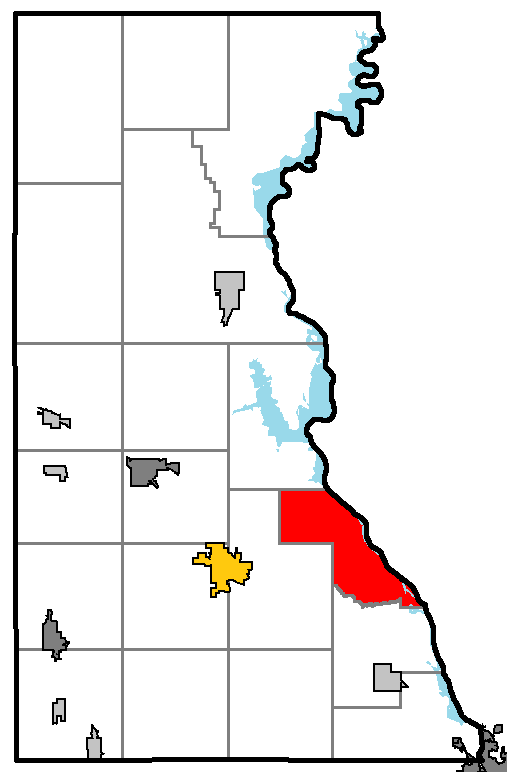
- Location of Marion, Juneau County

- Location of Juneau County, Wisconsin
- Coordinates: 43°49′16″N 89°56′35″W
- Country: United States
- State: Wisconsin
- County: Juneau

Area
  - Total: 24.4 sq mi (63.3 km^{2})
  - Land: 23.5 sq mi (60.8 km^{2})
  - Water: 0.93 sq mi (2.4 km^{2})
- Elevation: 869 ft (265 m)

Population (2020)
  - Total: 444
  - Density: 18.9/sq mi (7.30/km^{2})
- Time zone: UTC-6 (Central (CST))
  - Summer (DST): UTC-5 (CDT)
- Area code: 608
- FIPS code: 55-49375
- GNIS feature ID: 1583656

Marion is a town in Juneau County, Wisconsin, United States. The population was 444 at the 2020 census.

== Geography ==
According to the United States Census Bureau, the town has a total area of 24.4 square miles (63.3 km^{2}), of which 23.5 square miles (60.8 km^{2}) is land and 0.9 square mile (2.4 km^{2}) (3.85%) is water.

== Demographics ==
As of the census of 2000, there were 433 people, 184 households, and 131 families residing in the town. The population density was 18.4 people per square mile (7.1/km^{2}). There were 239 housing units at an average density of 10.2 per square mile (3.9/km^{2}). The racial makeup of the town was 98.85% White, 0.46% Native American, and 0.69% from two or more races. Hispanic or Latino of any race were 0.46% of the population.

There were 184 households, out of which 26.1% had children under the age of 18 living with them, 59.8% were married couples living together, 8.2% had a female householder with no husband present, and 28.3% were non-families. 25.0% of all households were made up of individuals, and 9.2% had someone living alone who was 65 years of age or older. The average household size was 2.35 and the average family size was 2.75.

In the town, the population was spread out, with 19.9% under the age of 18, 6.2% from 18 to 24, 23.3% from 25 to 44, 35.8% from 45 to 64, and 14.8% who were 65 years of age or older. The median age was 45 years. For every 100 females, there were 102.3 males. For every 100 females age 18 and over, there were 96.0 males.

The median income for a household in the town was $41,058, and the median income for a family was $41,563. Males had a median income of $30,417 versus $20,417 for females. The per capita income for the town was $20,764. About 3.8% of families and 4.5% of the population were below the poverty line, including 10.3% of those under age 18 and 3.4% of those age 65 or over.
