= Necedah, Wisconsin =

- Village
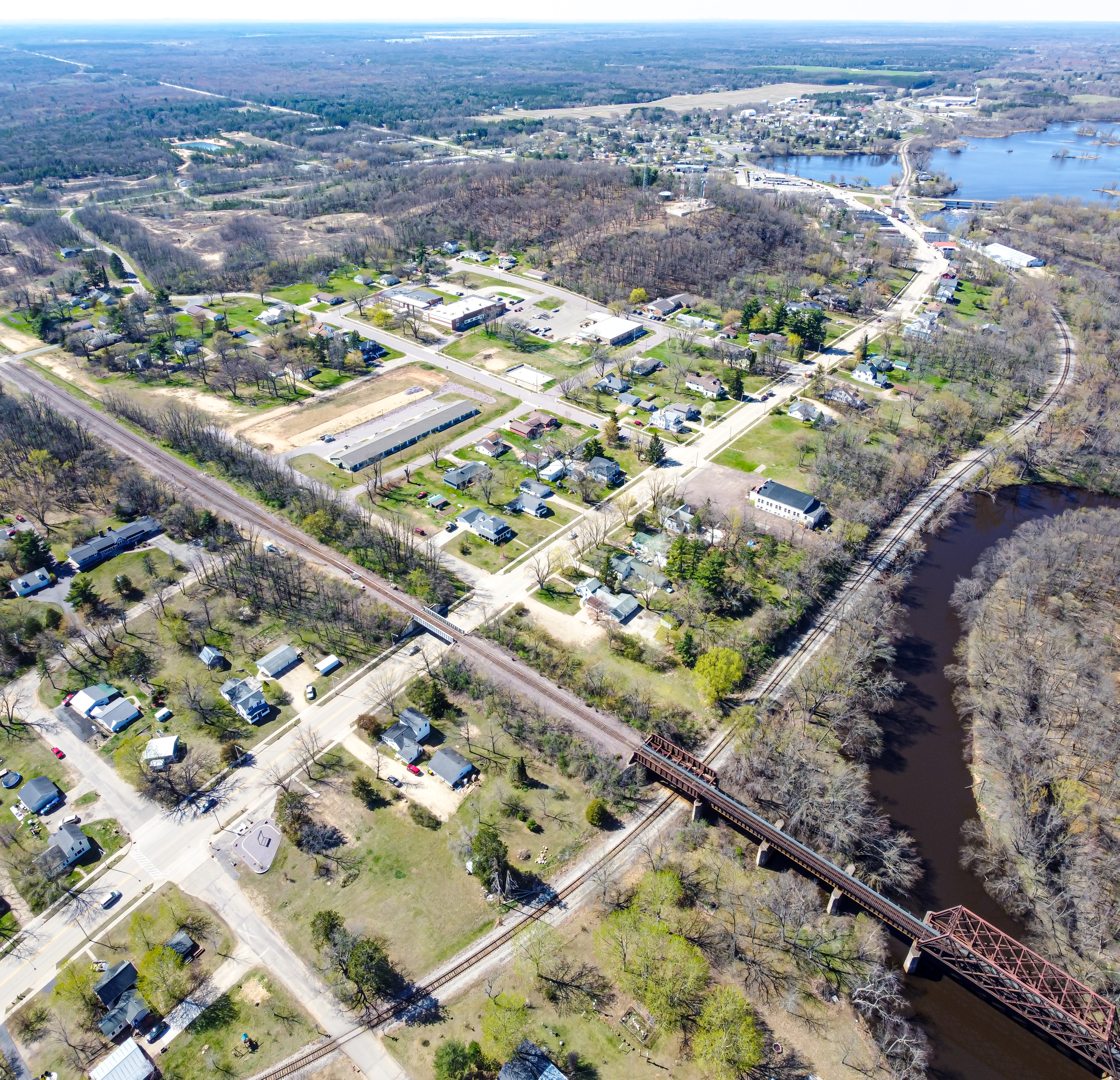
- Wis-80 and Wis-21 junction in town

- Location of Necedah in Juneau County, Wisconsin.

- Location within Wisconsin
- Coordinates: 44°1.3′N 90°4.2′W
- Country: United States
- State: Wisconsin
- County: Juneau

Area
  - Total: 3.07 sq mi (7.96 km^{2})
  - Land: 2.76 sq mi (7.16 km^{2})
  - Water: 0.31 sq mi (0.81 km^{2})
- Elevation: 920 ft (280 m)

Population (2020)
  - Total: 924
  - Density: 332/sq mi (128.3/km^{2})
- Time zone: UTC-6 (Central (CST))
  - Summer (DST): UTC-5 (CDT)
- Area code: 608
- FIPS code: 55-55725
- GNIS feature ID: 1570130
- Website: www.necedah.us

Necedah /nəˈsiːdə/ is a village in Juneau County, Wisconsin, United States. The population was 916 at the 2020 census. The village is located within the Town of Necedah.

== Geography ==
Necedah is located at 44°1.3′N 90°4.2′W (44.0262, −90.0737).

According to the United States Census Bureau, the village has a total area of 3.10 square miles (8.03 km^{2}), of which 2.79 square miles (7.23 km^{2}) is land and 0.31 square miles (0.80 km^{2}) is water.

=== Airport ===
Necedah Airport (KDAF), serves the city and surrounding communities.

=== Climate ===
Climate data for Necedah, Wisconsin (1991–2020)
Month	Jan	Feb	Mar	Apr	May	Jun	Jul	Aug	Sep	Oct	Nov	Dec	Year
Mean daily maximum °F (°C)	26.2 (−3.2)	31.5 (−0.3)	44.2 (6.8)	58.7 (14.8)	70.9 (21.6)	79.6 (26.4)	83.6 (28.7)	81.1 (27.3)	73.6 (23.1)	60.1 (15.6)	43.6 (6.4)	30.9 (−0.6)	57.0 (13.9)
Daily mean °F (°C)	16.1 (−8.8)	20.5 (−6.4)	32.0 (0.0)	45.0 (7.2)	57.3 (14.1)	66.4 (19.1)	70.6 (21.4)	68.4 (20.2)	60.6 (15.9)	47.9 (8.8)	33.7 (0.9)	21.7 (−5.7)	45.0 (7.2)
Mean daily minimum °F (°C)	6.0 (−14.4)	9.4 (−12.6)	19.9 (−6.7)	31.4 (−0.3)	43.6 (6.4)	53.2 (11.8)	57.5 (14.2)	55.7 (13.2)	47.6 (8.7)	35.8 (2.1)	23.8 (−4.6)	12.4 (−10.9)	33.0 (0.6)
Average precipitation inches (mm)	1.15 (29)	1.03 (26)	1.76 (45)	3.22 (82)	3.92 (100)	5.13 (130)	4.47 (114)	3.97 (101)	3.32 (84)	2.73 (69)	1.87 (47)	1.51 (38)	34.08 (865)
Average snowfall inches (cm)	8.1 (21)	7.6 (19)	6.0 (15)	1.5 (3.8)	0.0 (0.0)	0.0 (0.0)	0.0 (0.0)	0.0 (0.0)	0.0 (0.0)	0.2 (0.51)	2.4 (6.1)	8.3 (21)	34.1 (86.41)
Source: NOAA

== Demographics ==
Historical population
Census	Pop.	Note	%±
1870	944		—
1880	1,475		56.3%
1890	1,708		15.8%
1900	1,209		−29.2%
1910	1,054		−12.8%
1920	852		−19.2%
1930	761		−10.7%
1940	838		10.1%
1950	862		2.9%
1960	691		−19.8%
1970	740		7.1%
1980	773		4.5%
1990	743		−3.9%
2000	888		19.5%
2010	916		3.2%
2020	924		0.9%
U.S. Decennial Census

=== 2010 census ===
As of the census of 2010, there were 916 people, 376 households, and 223 families living in the village. The population density was 328.3 inhabitants per square mile (126.8/km^{2}). There were 469 housing units at an average density of 168.1 per square mile (64.9/km^{2}). The racial makeup of the village was 96.6% White, 0.7% African American, 0.1% Native American, 0.3% Asian, 0.8% from other races, and 1.5% from two or more races. Hispanic or Latino of any race were 2.8% of the population.

There were 376 households, of which 34.3% had children under the age of 18 living with them, 41.8% were married couples living together, 11.2% had a female householder with no husband present, 6.4% had a male householder with no wife present, and 40.7% were non-families. 34.0% of all households were made up of individuals, and 18.9% had someone living alone who was 65 years of age or older. The average household size was 2.41 and the average family size was 3.11.

The median age in the village was 38.8 years. 27.7% of residents were under the age of 18; 7.4% were between the ages of 18 and 24; 23.2% were from 25 to 44; 25.5% were from 45 to 64; and 16% were 65 years of age or older. The gender makeup of the village was 48.0% male and 52.0% female.

=== 2000 census ===
As of the census of 2000, there were 888 people, 359 households, and 236 families living in the village. The population density was 333.3 people per square mile (128.9/km^{2}). There were 414 housing units at an average density of 155.4 per square mile (60.1/km^{2}). The racial makeup of the village was 98.20% White, 0.23% Black or African American, 0.34% Native American, 0.23% Asian, 0.45% from other races, and 0.56% from two or more races. 0.68% of the population were Hispanic or Latino of any race.

There were 359 households, out of which 37.0% had children under the age of 18 living with them, 48.7% were married couples living together, 11.7% had a female householder with no husband present, and 34.0% were non-families. 29.8% of all households were made up of individuals, and 13.1% had someone living alone who was 65 years of age or older. The average household size was 2.43 and the average family size was 3.05.

In the village, the population was spread out, with 30.5% under the age of 18, 8.0% from 18 to 24, 28.9% from 25 to 44, 20.5% from 45 to 64, and 12.0% who were 65 years of age or older. The median age was 34 years. For every 100 females, there were 93.5 males. For every 100 females age 18 and over, there were 91.0 males.

The median income for a household in the village was $32,135, and the median income for a family was $37,788. Males had a median income of $34,417 versus $20,673 for females. The per capita income for the village was $14,766. About 9.8% of families and 13.1% of the population were below the poverty line, including 10.1% of those under age 18 and 15.6% of those age 65 or over.

== Attractions ==
The Necedah Shrine, Necedah National Wildlife Refuge, and the Petenwell Rock are located nearby.

== Notable people ==
- Joseph W. Babcock, U.S. Representative.
- Harold G. Bradbury, U.S. Coast Guard admiral
- John T. Kingston, Wisconsin State Senator and Representative.
- John Kingston, Jr., Wisconsin State Senator
- Eliphalet S. Miner, Wisconsin State Representative and Senator
- Frank M. Reed, Wisconsin State Representative
- E. D. Rogers, Wisconsin State Representative
- Jim Sauter, Jay Sauter, Johnny Sauter, Tim Sauter, and Travis Sauter, NASCAR drivers
- W. Peter Wheelihan, Wisconsin State Representative

== Images ==
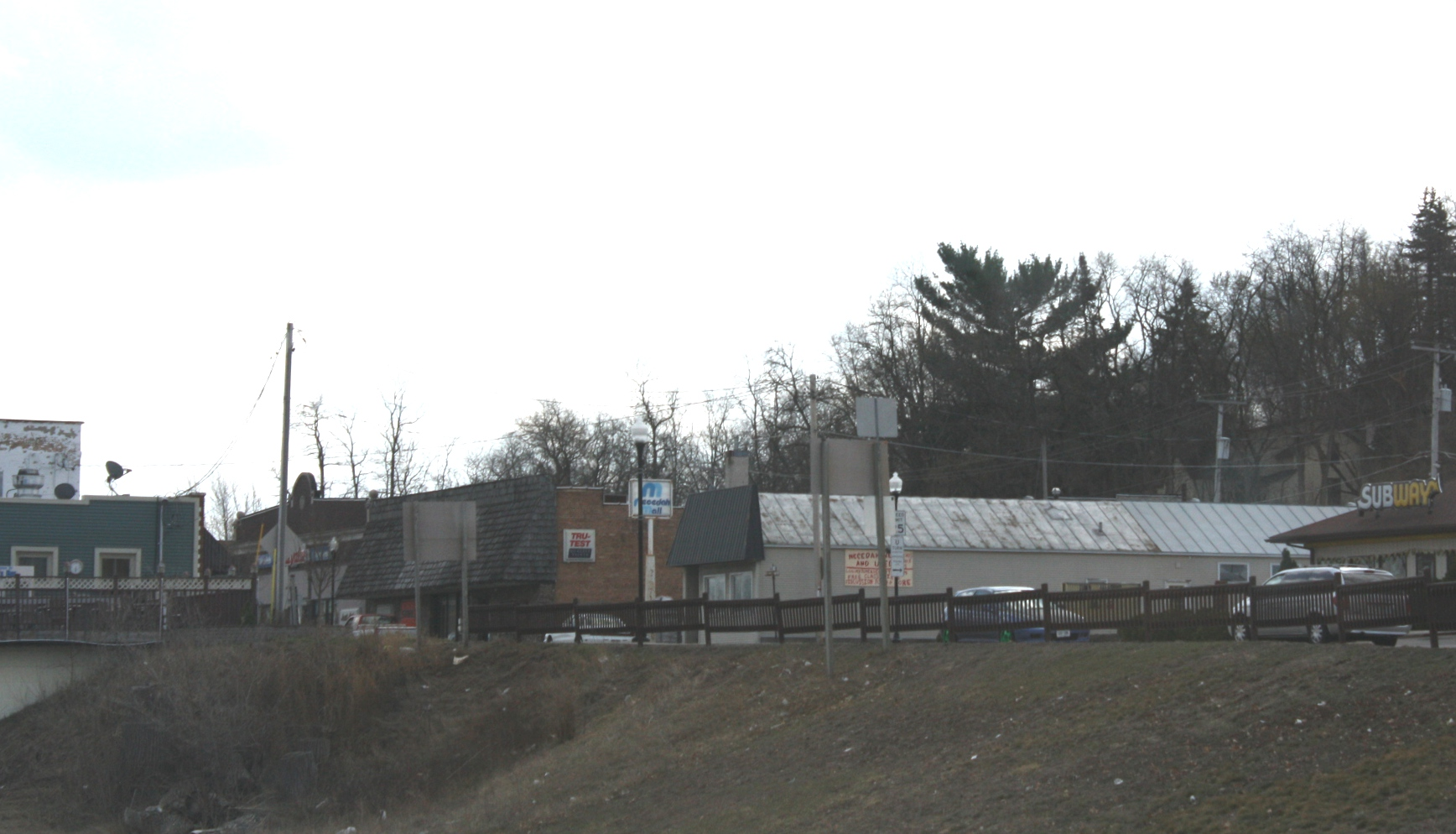
Downtown

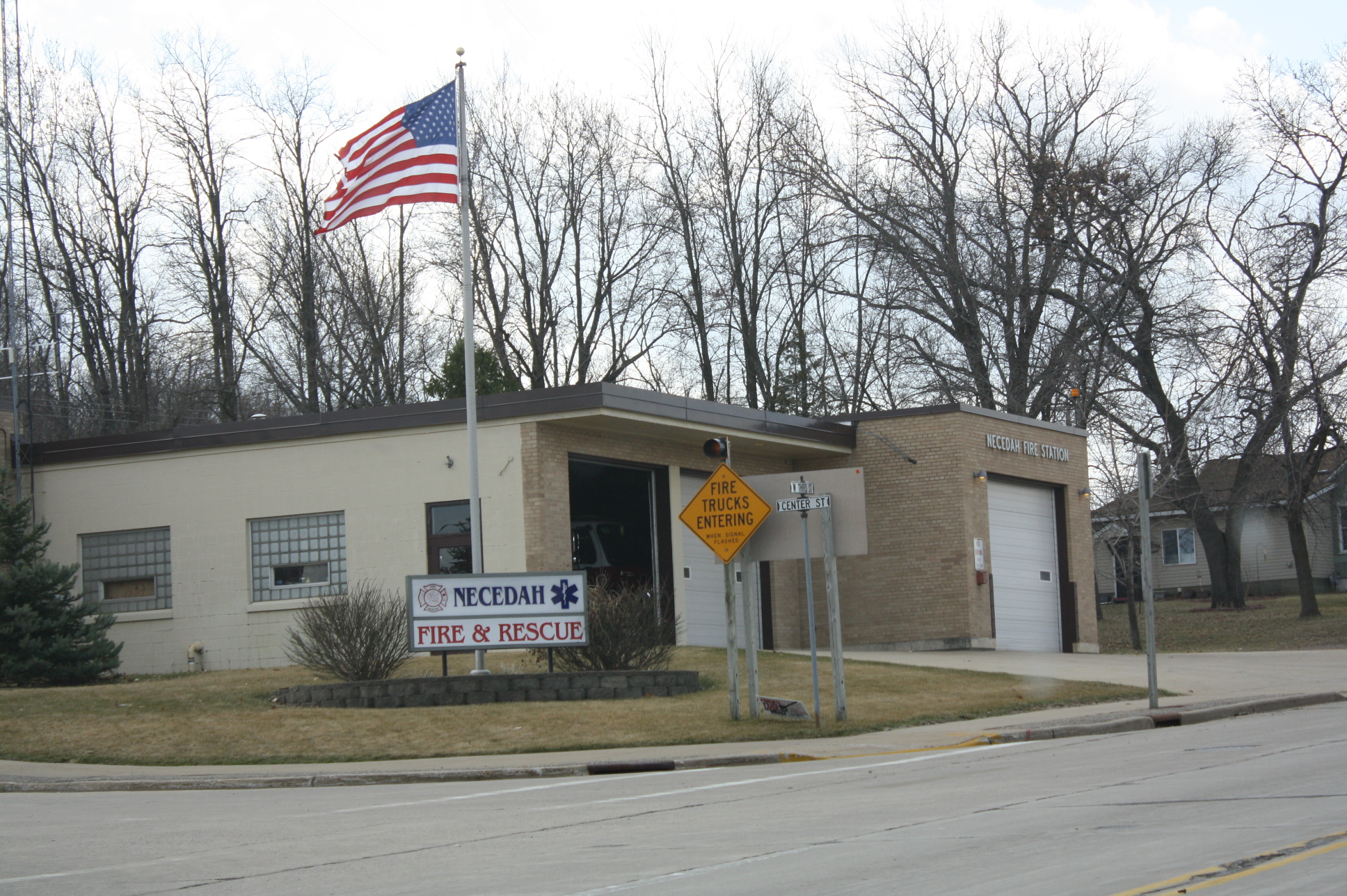
Fire station

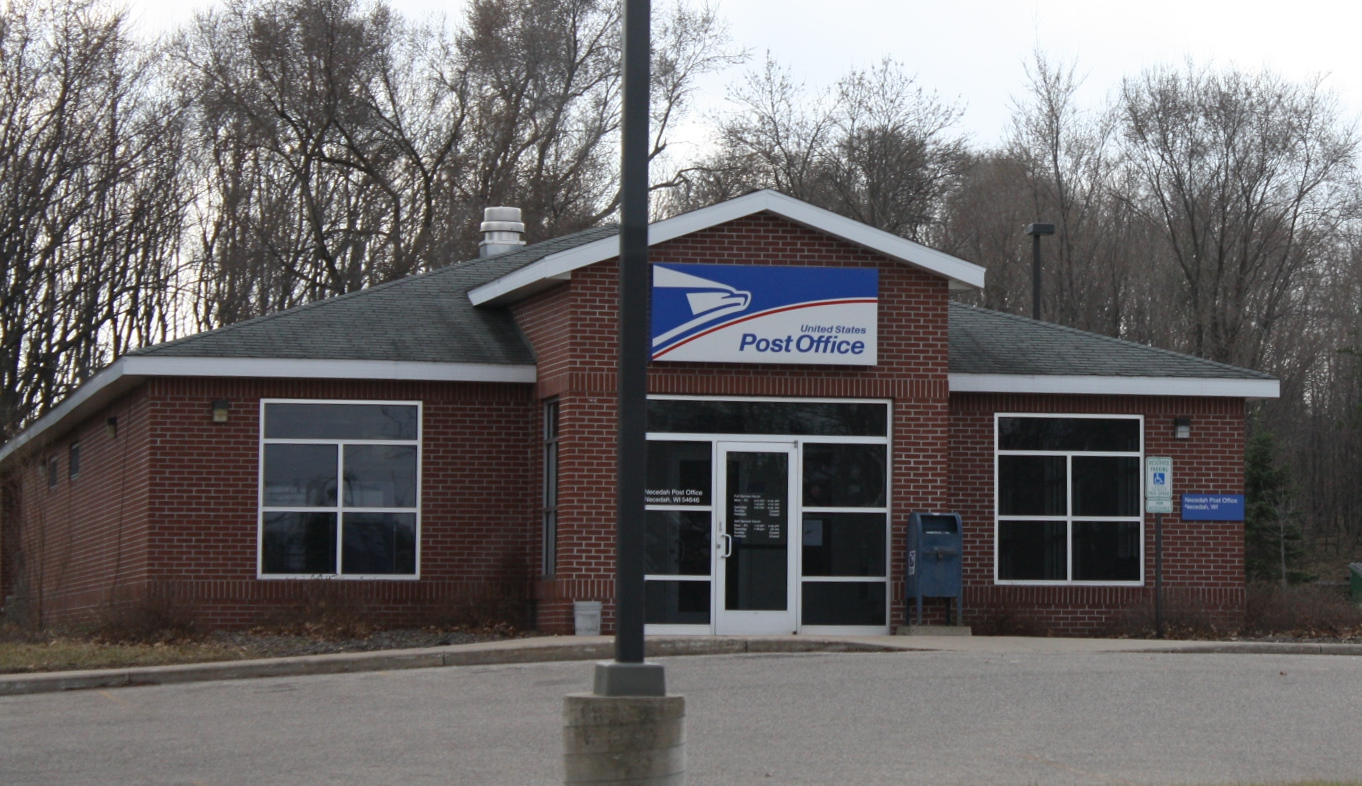
Post office

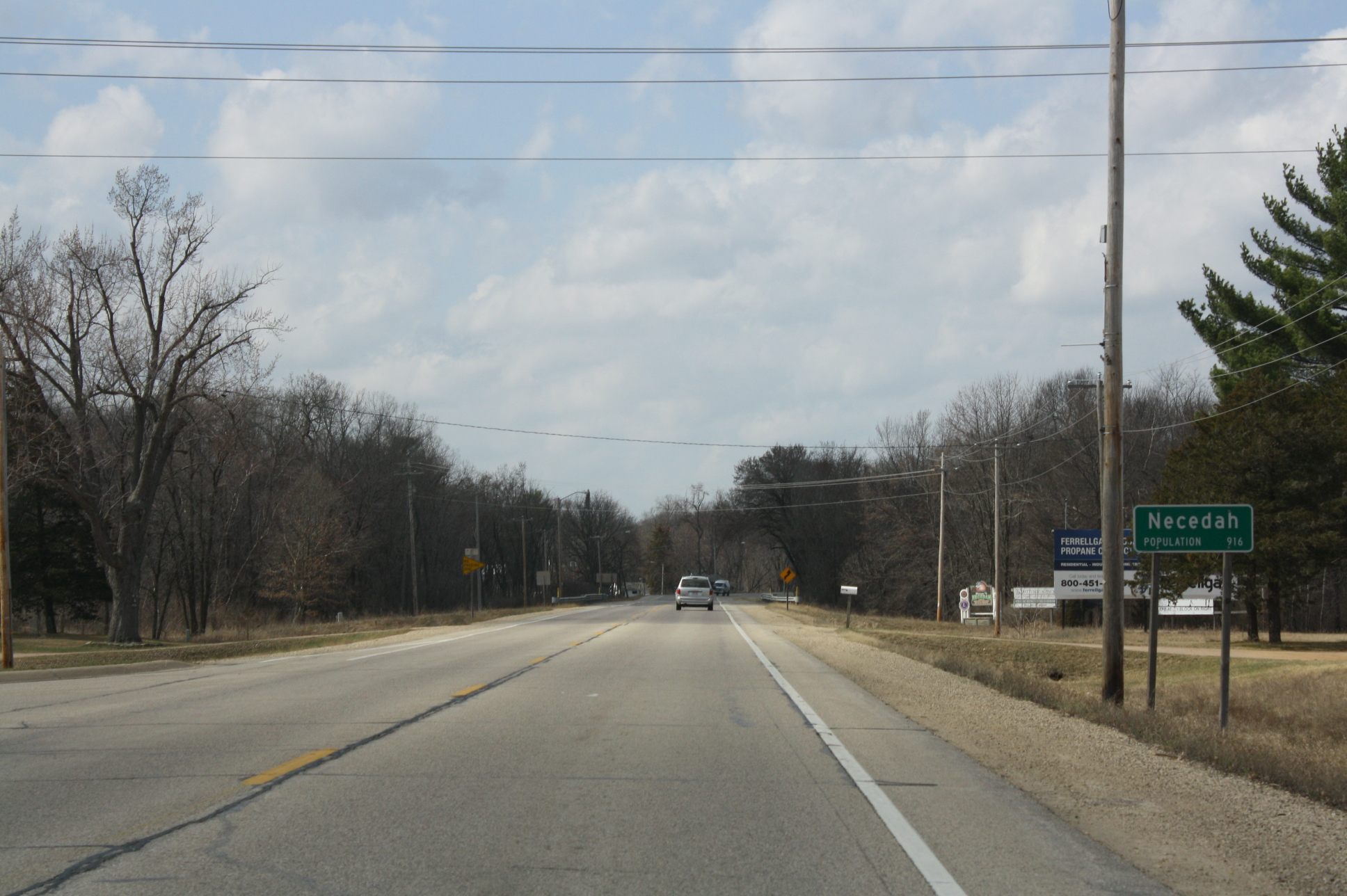
Sign on WIS 21

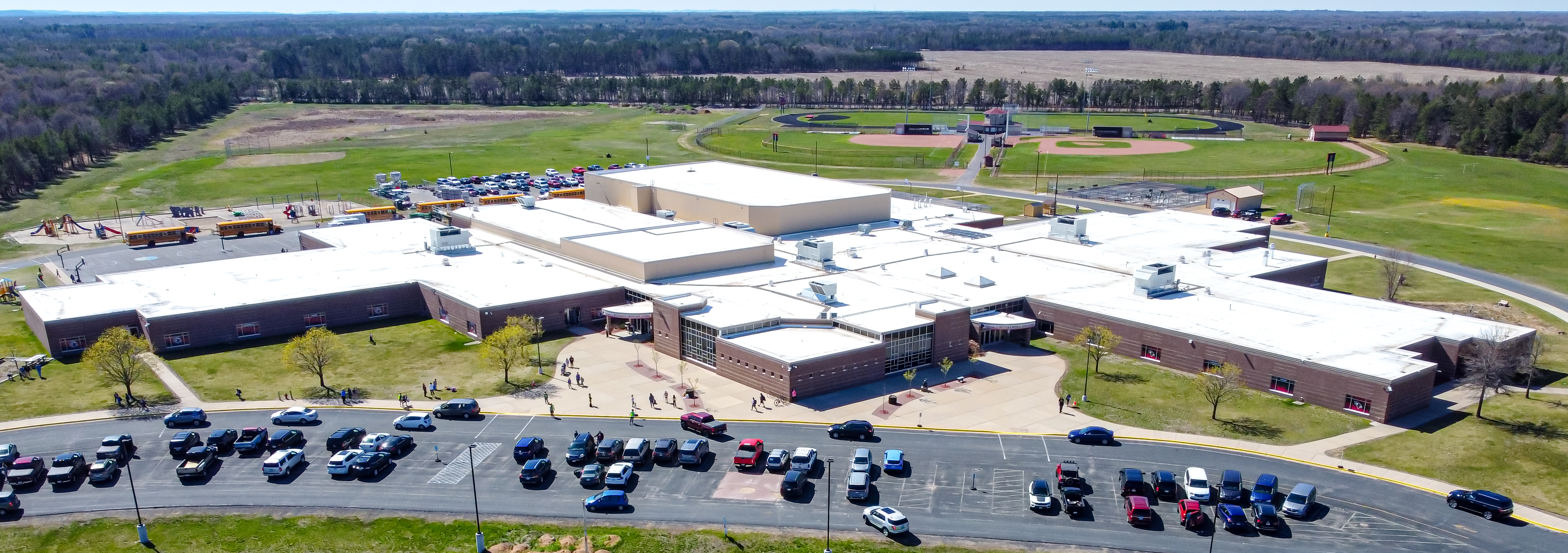
Necedah High School
