= W. Peter Wheelihan =

American politician

W. Peter Wheelihan (February 22, 1844 – March 24, 1909) was an American lumberman and politician.

Born in Halton County, Canada West, Wheelihan emigrated to the United States in 1865 and settled in Wisconsin. In 1867, Wheelihan moved to Necedah, Juneau County, Wisconsin. Wheelihan was in the lumber and real estate business. Wheelihan served as chairman of the Necedah Town Board and as president of the Necedah Village Board. He also served on the Necedah Board of Education and was the board secretary. In 1893, Wheelihan served in the Wisconsin State Assembly and was a Democrat. Wheelihan died at his home in Necedah, Wisconsin.
