= Clearfield, Wisconsin =

- Town
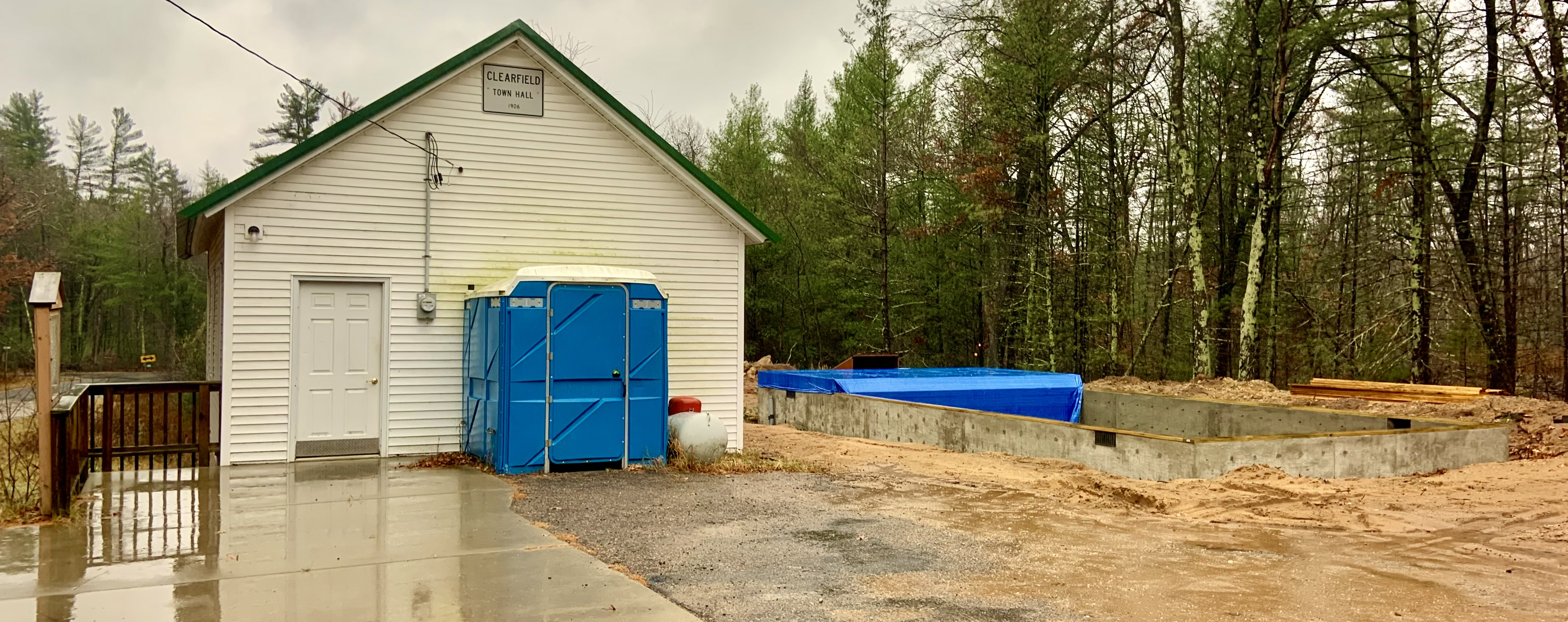
- Town hall

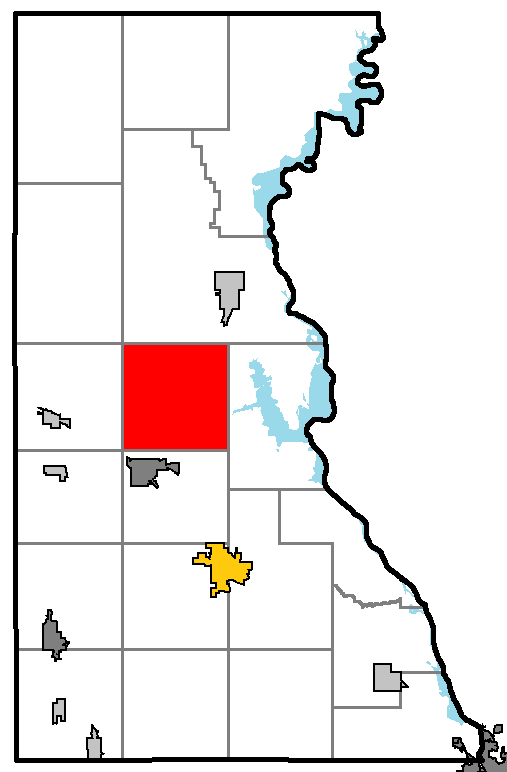
- Location of Clearfield, Juneau County

- Location of Juneau County, Wisconsin
- Coordinates: 43°55′45″N 90°8′24″W
- Country: United States
- State: Wisconsin
- County: Juneau

Area
  - Total: 35.8 sq mi (92.8 km^{2})
  - Land: 35.8 sq mi (92.8 km^{2})
  - Water: 0 sq mi (0.0 km^{2})
- Elevation: 909 ft (277 m)

Population (2020)
  - Total: 702
  - Density: 19.6/sq mi (7.56/km^{2})
- Time zone: UTC-6 (Central (CST))
  - Summer (DST): UTC-5 (CDT)
- Area code: 608
- FIPS code: 55-15225
- GNIS feature ID: 1582971
- Website: https://townofclearfieldwi.gov/

Clearfield is a town in Juneau County, Wisconsin, United States. The population was 702 at the 2020 census. The unincorporated community of Kelly is located in the town.

== Geography ==
According to the United States Census Bureau, the town has a total area of 35.8 square miles (92.8 km^{2}), all land.

== Demographics ==
As of the census of 2000, there were 737 people, 296 households, and 221 families residing in the town. The population density was 20.6 people per square mile (7.9/km^{2}). There were 432 housing units at an average density of 12.1 per square mile (4.7/km^{2}). The racial makeup of the town was 98.24% White, 0.27% African American, 0.14% Native American, 0.27% Asian, 0.14% Pacific Islander, and 0.95% from two or more races. Hispanic or Latino of any race were 0.54% of the population.

There were 296 households, out of which 25.3% had children under the age of 18 living with them, 64.5% were married couples living together, 5.7% had a female householder with no husband present, and 25.3% were non-families. 20.6% of all households were made up of individuals, and 7.8% had someone living alone who was 65 years of age or older. The average household size was 2.49 and the average family size was 2.82.

In the town, the population was spread out, with 22.7% under the age of 18, 5.7% from 18 to 24, 27.4% from 25 to 44, 30.8% from 45 to 64, and 13.4% who were 65 years of age or older. The median age was 42 years. For every 100 females, there were 110.0 males. For every 100 females age 18 and over, there were 105.0 males.

The median income for a household in the town was $35,781, and the median income for a family was $40,221. Males had a median income of $32,212 versus $20,625 for females. The per capita income for the town was $17,445. About 10.7% of families and 13.5% of the population were below the poverty line, including 20.3% of those under age 18 and 4.2% of those age 65 or over.
