= John M. Nelson =

American politician (1870–1955)

John Mandt Nelson
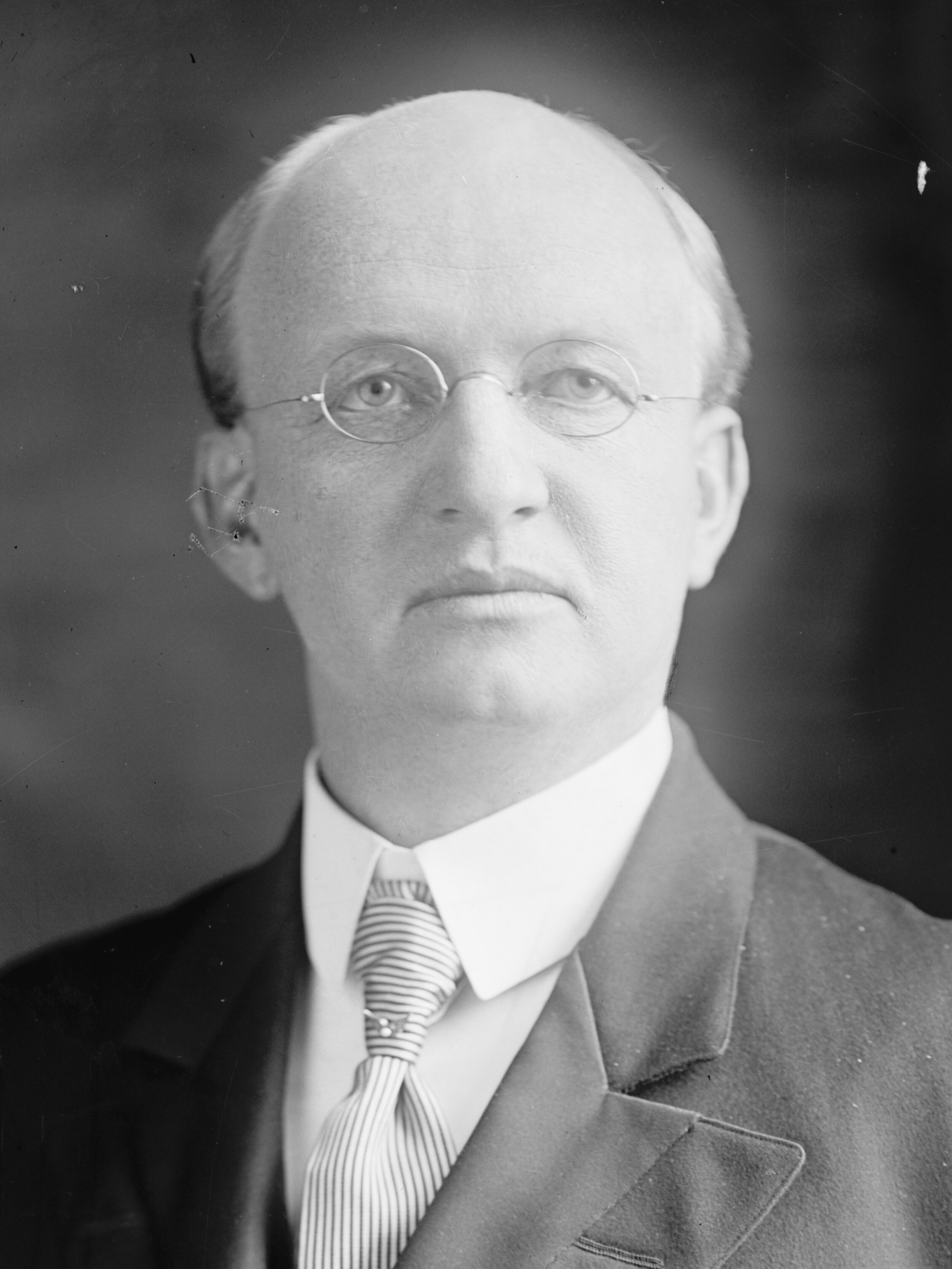
- Portrait by Harris & Ewing

Member of the U.S. House of Representatives from Wisconsin
- In office March 4, 1921 – March 3, 1933
- Preceded by: James G. Monahan
- Succeeded by: Gardner R. Withrow
- Constituency: 3rd district
- In office March 4, 1913 – March 3, 1919
- Preceded by: Arthur W. Kopp
- Succeeded by: James G. Monahan
- Constituency: 3rd district
- In office September 4, 1906 – March 3, 1913
- Preceded by: Henry Cullen Adams
- Succeeded by: Michael E. Burke
- Constituency: 2nd district

Personal details
- Born: October 10, 1870 Burke, Wisconsin, U.S.
- Died: January 29, 1955 (aged 84) Madison, Wisconsin, U.S.
- Resting place: Forest Hill Cemetery, Madison
- Party: Republican
- Spouse: Thea Johanna Stondall (m. 1891; died 1946)
- Children: Agnes Edna Genevieve Nelson^{(b. 1892; died 1988)}; Byron Christopher Nelson^{(b. 1893; died 1972)}; Ruth Johanna Nelson^{(b. 1895; died 1969)}; Harold Mandt Nelson^{(b. 1897; died 1967)}; Grace Lucille Nelson^{(b. 1899; died 1996)}; Robert M. Nelson^{(b. 1903; died 1929)}
- Education: University of Wisconsin–Madison

John Mandt Nelson (October 10, 1870 – January 29, 1955) was an American public administrator and progressive Republican politician from Dane County, Wisconsin. He served 12 terms in the U.S. House of Representatives, representing southwestern Wisconsin from 1906 to 1919, and from 1921 to 1933. He was a leading member of the progressive movement in Wisconsin, and served as chairman of Robert M. La Follette's presidential campaign in the 1924 election.

In Congress, Nelson was twice involved in notable progressive rebellions against speakers of his own party. He was a committed temperance advocate and supporter of prohibition, contributing to his defeat in the 1932 primary.

== Early life ==
John Mandt Nelson was born on his family's farm in the town of Burke, Wisconsin, on October 10, 1870. He attended the public schools and graduated from the University of Wisconsin–Madison in 1892.

After completing his college education, he was elected superintendent of schools for Dane County, Wisconsin, and served from 1892 to 1894. He then was hired as a clerk in the office of the Secretary of State of Wisconsin. While working in that office, he attended the University of Wisconsin Law School, earning his law degree in 1896. He worked as editor of The State, published in Madison, Wisconsin, in 1897 and 1898, then worked as correspondent in the state treasury from 1898 to 1902. He also pursued a postgraduate course from 1901 to 1903.

== Political career ==
In 1901, Nelson was also elected to the state central committee of the Republican Party of Wisconsin. He served in that role for the next four years.

Wisconsin's 2nd congressional district 1902–1911

In July 1906, U.S. representative Henry Cullen Adams died in office, necessitating a special election to fill the remainder of his term in the 59th Congress. Nelson received the Republican nomination for the special election, and went on to succeed Adams representing Wisconsin's 2nd congressional district. He was elected to a full term at the general election later that year, and was re-elected twice more in that district, serving from September 4, 1906 till March 3, 1913.

Wisconsin's 3rd congressional district 1912–1931

From the 63rd Congress he represented Wisconsin's 3rd congressional district and was reelected to the following 64th and 65th Congresses as well from March 4, 1913 till March 3, 1919. On April 5, 1917, he voted against declaring war on Germany. He was an unsuccessful candidate during the 1918 Congressional election.

After missing one term in congress, Nelson was elected once again as Wisconsin's 3rd congressional district representative to the Sixty-seventh and to the five succeeding Congresses (March 4, 1921 – March 3, 1933). He served as chairman of the Committee on Elections No. 2 Sixty-eighth Congress. He served on the Committee on Invalid Pensions (Seventy-first Congress). He was an unsuccessful candidate for renomination in 1932 to the Seventy-third Congress. He retired from business and political activities.

== Personal life ==
John M. Nelson was the son of Norwegian American immigrants Christopher and Elsie (née Bergeland) Nelson.

John Nelson married his second cousin Thea Johanna Stondahl on July 25, 1891. They had six children, but their youngest son, Robert, died in the 1929 Drocourt railroad accident.

Their eldest son was Byron C. Nelson, a notable Lutheran pastor and apologist for creationism.

John Nelson died on January 29, 1955, in Madison, Wisconsin following a long illness. He was interred in Forest Hill Cemetery in Madison.

U.S. House of Representatives
Preceded by Henry Cullen Adams	Member of the U.S. House of Representatives from Wisconsin's 2nd congressional district 1906-1913	Succeeded by Michael E. Burke
Preceded by Arthur W. Kopp	Member of the U.S. House of Representatives from Wisconsin's 3rd congressional district 1913-1919	Succeeded by James G. Monahan
Preceded by James G. Monahan	Member of the U.S. House of Representatives from Wisconsin's 3rd congressional district 1921-1933	Succeeded by Gardner R. Withrow
