= Fountain, Wisconsin =

- Town
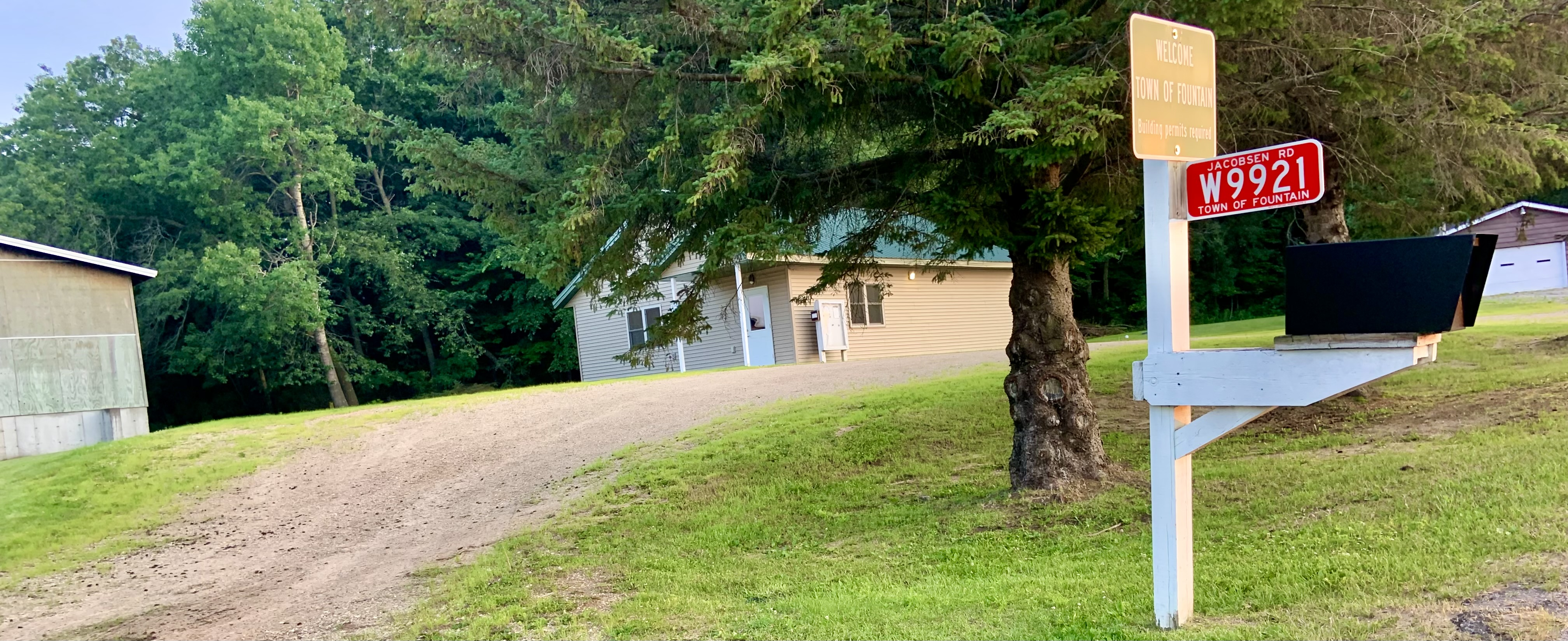
- Town hall

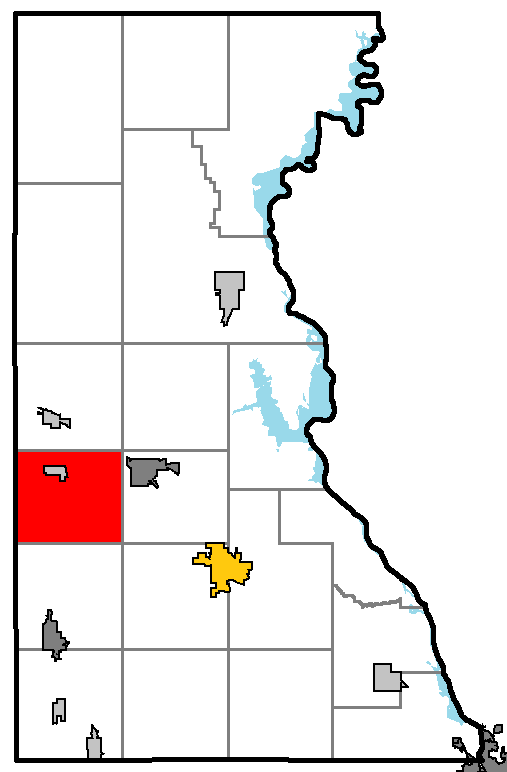
- Location of Fountain, Juneau County

- Location of Juneau County, Wisconsin
- Coordinates: 43°51′39″N 90°15′38″W
- Country: United States
- State: Wisconsin
- County: Juneau

Area
  - Total: 30.8 sq mi (79.9 km^{2})
  - Land: 30.8 sq mi (79.9 km^{2})
  - Water: 0 sq mi (0 km^{2})
- Elevation: 935 ft (285 m)

Population (2020)
  - Total: 592
  - Density: 19.2/sq mi (7.41/km^{2})
- Time zone: UTC-6 (Central (CST))
  - Summer (DST): UTC-5 (CDT)
- Area code: 608
- FIPS code: 55-26825
- GNIS feature ID: 1583222
- Website: https://www.townoffountain.org/

Fountain is a town in Juneau County, Wisconsin, United States. The population was 592 at the 2020 census.

== Geography ==
According to the United States Census Bureau, the town has a total area of 30.8 square miles (79.9 km^{2}), all land.

== Demographics ==
As of the census of 2000, there were 582 people, 194 households, and 155 families residing in the town. The population density was 18.9 people per square mile (7.3/km^{2}). There were 221 housing units at an average density of 7.2 per square mile (2.8/km^{2}). The racial makeup of the town was 98.8% White, 0.17% African American, 0.17% Pacific Islander, and 0.86% from two or more races. Hispanic or Latino people of any race were 0.17% of the population.

There were 194 households, out of which 34% had children under the age of 18 living with them, 67% were married couples living together, 8.8% had a female householder with no husband present, and 19.6% were non-families. 15.5% of all households were made up of individuals, and 4.6% had someone living alone who was 65 years of age or older. The average household size was 2.72 and the average family size was 3.01.

In the town, the population was spread out, with 23% under the age of 18, 5.3% from 18 to 24, 24.9% from 25 to 44, 27.3% from 45 to 64, and 19.4% who were 65 years of age or older. The median age was 42 years. For every 100 females, there were 100.7 males. For every 100 females age 18 and over, there were 100 males.

The median income for a household in the town was $47,500, and the median income for a family was $48,750. Males had a median income of $31,875 versus $21,786 for females. The per capita income for the town was $17,350. About 8.4% of families and 11.7% of the population were below the poverty line, including 23.9% of those under age 18 and 11.7% of those age 65 or over.
