= James G. Monahan =

American politician (1855–1923)

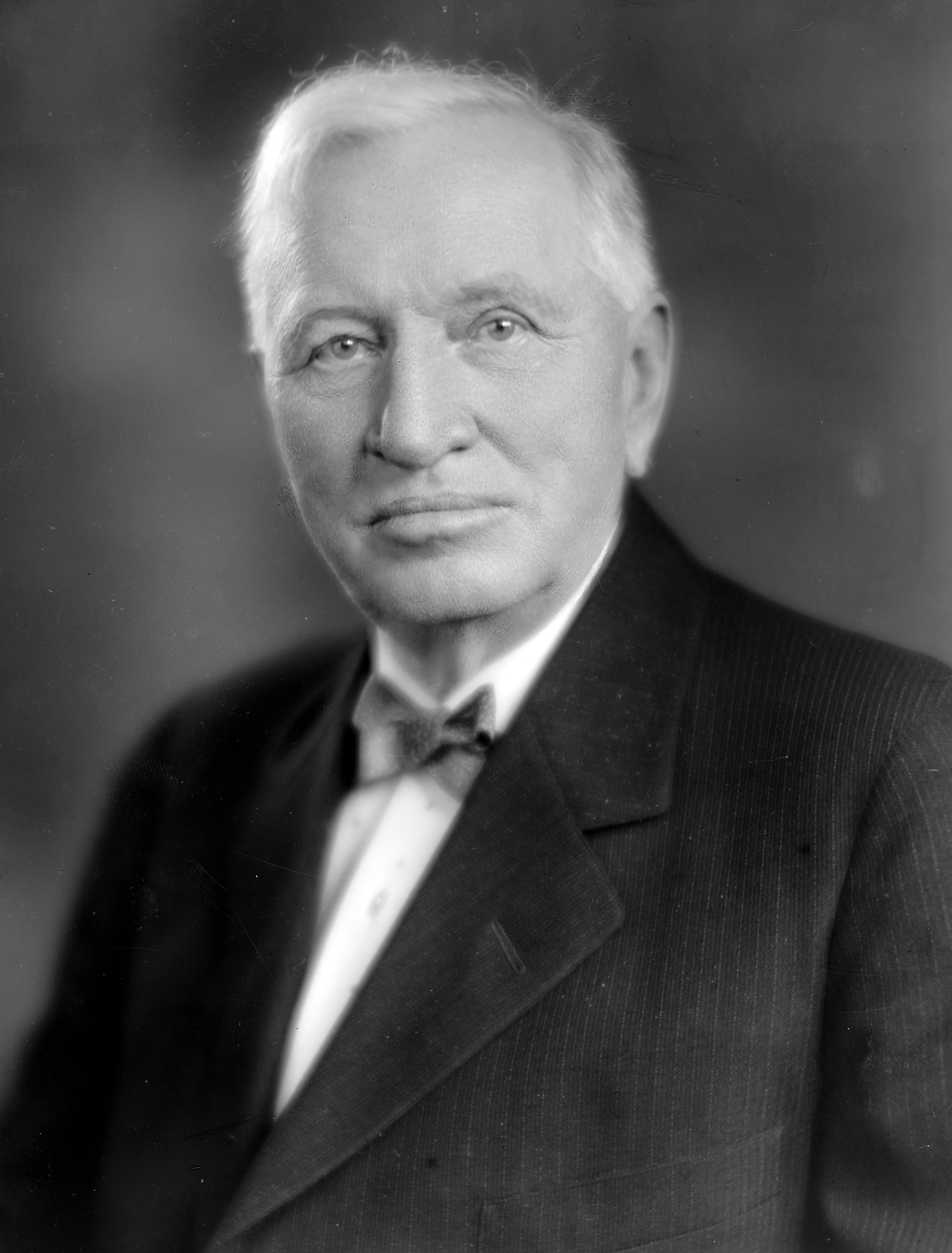

Member of the U.S. House of Representatives from Wisconsin's 3rd district
- In office March 4, 1919 – March 3, 1921
- Preceded by: John M. Nelson
- Succeeded by: John M. Nelson

Personal details
- Born: James Gideon Monahan; January 12, 1855 Darlington, Wisconsin, U.S.
- Died: December 5, 1923 (aged 68) Dubuque, Iowa, U.S.
- Resting place: Union Grove Cemetery, Darlington, Wisconsin
- Party: Republican
- Spouse: Helen W. Waddington (m. 1886–1923)
- Profession: Lawyer

James Gideon Monahan (January 12, 1855 – December 5, 1923) was an American lawyer and Republican politician from Iowa County, Wisconsin. He served one term in the U.S. House of Representatives, representing Wisconsin's 3rd congressional district for the 66th Congress (1919–1921).

== Early life ==
Born at Willow Springs, Wisconsin, near Darlington, Monahan attended the common schools and graduated from the Darlington High School in 1875. He studied law and was admitted to the bar in 1878.

== Early career ==
He commenced practice in Mineral Point, Wisconsin. He returned to Darlington in 1880. He served as district attorney of Lafayette County 1880-1884. From 1883 till 1919 he was editor and owner of the Darlington Republican Journal. He served as delegate to the Republican National Convention in 1888. He also served as collector of internal revenue for the second Wisconsin district 1900-1908.

== Affiliations ==
He was a member of Evening Star Masonic Lodge #64 F&AM Wisconsin and served as the Most Worshipful Grand Master of Masons in Wisconsin in 1898.

== Congress ==
Monahan was elected as a Republican to the Sixty-sixth Congress (March 4, 1919 – March 3, 1921) as the representative of Wisconsin's 3rd congressional district. He was an unsuccessful candidate for renomination in 1920 to the Sixty-seventh Congress.

== Death and burial ==
He died in Dubuque, Iowa, December 5, 1923. He was interred in Union Grove Cemetery, Darlington, Wisconsin.

== Sources ==
- United States Congress. "James G. Monahan (id: M000849)". Biographical Directory of the United States Congress.

U.S. House of Representatives
Preceded by John M. Nelson	Member of the U.S. House of Representatives from Wisconsin's 3rd congressional district March 4, 1919 - March 3, 1921	Succeeded by John M. Nelson
