= George R. Vincent =

American physician

George R. Vincent (August 29, 1841 – September 18, 1910) was an American physician from Tomah, Wisconsin, who spent one term as a Greenbacker member of the Wisconsin State Assembly from Monroe County.

== Background ==
Vincent was born on August 29, 1841, in Norway, New York. He received an academic education, graduating from the University of Vermont College of Medicine and becoming a physician. He moved to Wisconsin in 1866, and settled at Tomah in Monroe County.

== Public office ==
He was a member of the village board of Tomah for several years, and president of the village in 1872. In 1876, he ran as an Independent candidate for the second Monroe County district of the Assembly (the Towns of Adrian, Byron, Clifton, Glendale, Greenfield, La Grange, Lincoln, Sheldon, the Town of Tomah, Wellington, Oakdale and Wilton), but lost to Republican Harry Doxtader, who polled 1036 votes to 338 for Vincent and 994 for Democrat Samuel Gunn. In 1878, he ran again as a Greenbacker against incumbent Republican William Y. Baker, and was successful, with 1069 votes to Baker's 787. He was assigned to the standing committees on assessment and collection of taxes, and on medical societies.

He did not run for re-election in 1879, and was succeeded by Robert Campbell, a Republican.

== Professional and personal life ==
When the Monroe County Medical Society was organized in 1903, he was elected its first President.

Vincent was married twice. In 1866, just before coming to Tomah, he was married at Stratford, New York, to Elizabeth Kibbe; she died in Tomah in 1889, and two years later he married Mary Tyler of Binghamton, New York (he continued to return to his native New York for visits). He died September 18, 1910.
