= Tomah =

Tomah is the name of places in the US state of Wisconsin:

- Tomah, Wisconsin, city
- Tomah (town), Wisconsin, town
- Tomah (Amtrak station), an Amtrak station in Tomah, Wisconsin
