= James R. Lyon =

American merchant and politician (1833 – c. 1914)

Member of the Wisconsin State Assembly from the Monroe 2nd district
- In office January 1, 1889 – January 1, 1891
- Preceded by: Miles L. Hineman
- Succeeded by: James Tormey

Personal details
- Born: November 4, 1833 Benton Center, New York
- Died: c. 1914 Kendall, Monroe County, Wisconsin
- Party: Republican
- Occupation: Merchant, Politician

Military service
- Allegiance: United States
- Branch/service: United States Army; Union Army
- Years of service: 1861–1865
- Rank: Private
- Unit: 6th Reg. Wis. Vol. Infantry
- Battles/wars: American Civil War

James R. Lyon (November 4, 1833 – c. 1914) was an American merchant, Republican politician, and Union Army volunteer in the American Civil War.

== Biography ==
Lyon was born on November 4, 1833, in Benton, New York. He later resided in Glendale, Monroe County, Wisconsin, and Sparta, Wisconsin. During the American Civil War, he served in Company I of the 6th Wisconsin Volunteer Infantry Regiment in the Union Army. Lyon was a merchant by trade.

== Assembly career ==
Lyon was elected to the Assembly in 1888 and was defeated seeking re-election in 1890. He was a Republican.

== Electoral history ==
Wisconsin Assembly, Monroe 2nd District Election, 1888
Party	Candidate	Votes	%	±%
General Election, November 6, 1888
Republican	James R. Lyon	1,463	54.15%	−8.17%
Democratic	James Wilson	1,160	42.93%	+7.71%
Prohibition	J. R. Jones	79	2.92%	+0.46%
Plurality		303	11.21%	-15.87%
Total votes		2,702	100.0%	+18.82%
Republican hold				

Wisconsin Assembly, Monroe 2nd District Election, 1890
Party	Candidate	Votes	%	±%
General Election, November 4, 1890
Democratic	James Tormey	1,156	52.64%	+9.71%
Republican	James R. Lyon (incumbent)	949	43.21%	−10.93%
Prohibition	Charles Lea	91	4.14%	+1.22%
Plurality		207	9.43%	-1.79%
Total votes		2,196	100.0%	-18.73%
Democratic gain from Republican		Swing	20.64%	

Wisconsin State Assembly
Preceded by Miles L. Hineman	Member of the Wisconsin State Assembly from the Monroe 2nd district January 1, 1889 – January 1, 1891	Succeeded by James Tormey
