= Robert Campbell (Wisconsin politician) =

19th century American politician (born 1841)

Member of the Wisconsin State Assembly from the Monroe 2nd district
- In office January 5, 1880 – January 3, 1881
- Preceded by: George R. Vincent
- Succeeded by: John O'Brien

Personal details
- Born: November 2, 1841 Carlisle, England, UK
- Died: after 1880
- Party: Republican
- Occupation: merchant

Robert Campbell (November 2, 1841 – after 1880) was a British-born American immigrant, businessman, politician, and Wisconsin pioneer. He served one term in the Wisconsin State Assembly, representing Monroe County during the 1880 session.

== Biography ==
Robert Campbell was born in Carlisle, Cumbria, England, in November 1841. As a child, he emigrated to the United States with his parents. They settled in Portage, Wisconsin, in 1849.

Robert Campbell went to work as an apprentice in a printing office when he was 14 years old, working on the printing of the Badger State and State Register newspapers. In 1868, he went into business with Charles P. Austin, establishing a grocery store under the name "Austin & Campbell". Within a year, however, Campbell sold his share of the partnership to John Gates, though he remained an employee in the firm.

About 1870, their firm leased a store in Glendale, in Monroe County, Wisconsin, and sent Campbell there to manage the new business. After a few years Campbell went into business with the owner of the Glendale store building, James R. Lyon, and operated the store under the new firm Lyon & Campbell.

Robert Campbell was elected to the Wisconsin State Assembly in 1879 from Monroe County's 2nd (eastern) Assembly district, running on the Republican Party ticket. He served in the 1880 session of the Legislature and was not a candidate for re-election in 1880.

His sister, Mary J. Campbell, married his one-time business partner Charles P. Austin.

== Electoral history ==
=== Wisconsin Assembly (1879) ===
Wisconsin Assembly, Monroe 2nd District Election, 1879
| Party | Candidate | Votes | % | ±% |
|---|---|---|---|---|
General Election, November 4, 1879
| Republican | Robert Campbell | 1,001 | 59.73% | |
| Democratic | John F. Richard | 409 | 24.40% | |
| Greenback | E. N. Palmer | 266 | 15.87% | |
| Plurality | | 592 | 35.32% | |
| Total votes | | 1,676 | 100.0% | |
| Republican hold | | | | |
