= Wilton, Wisconsin =

- Village
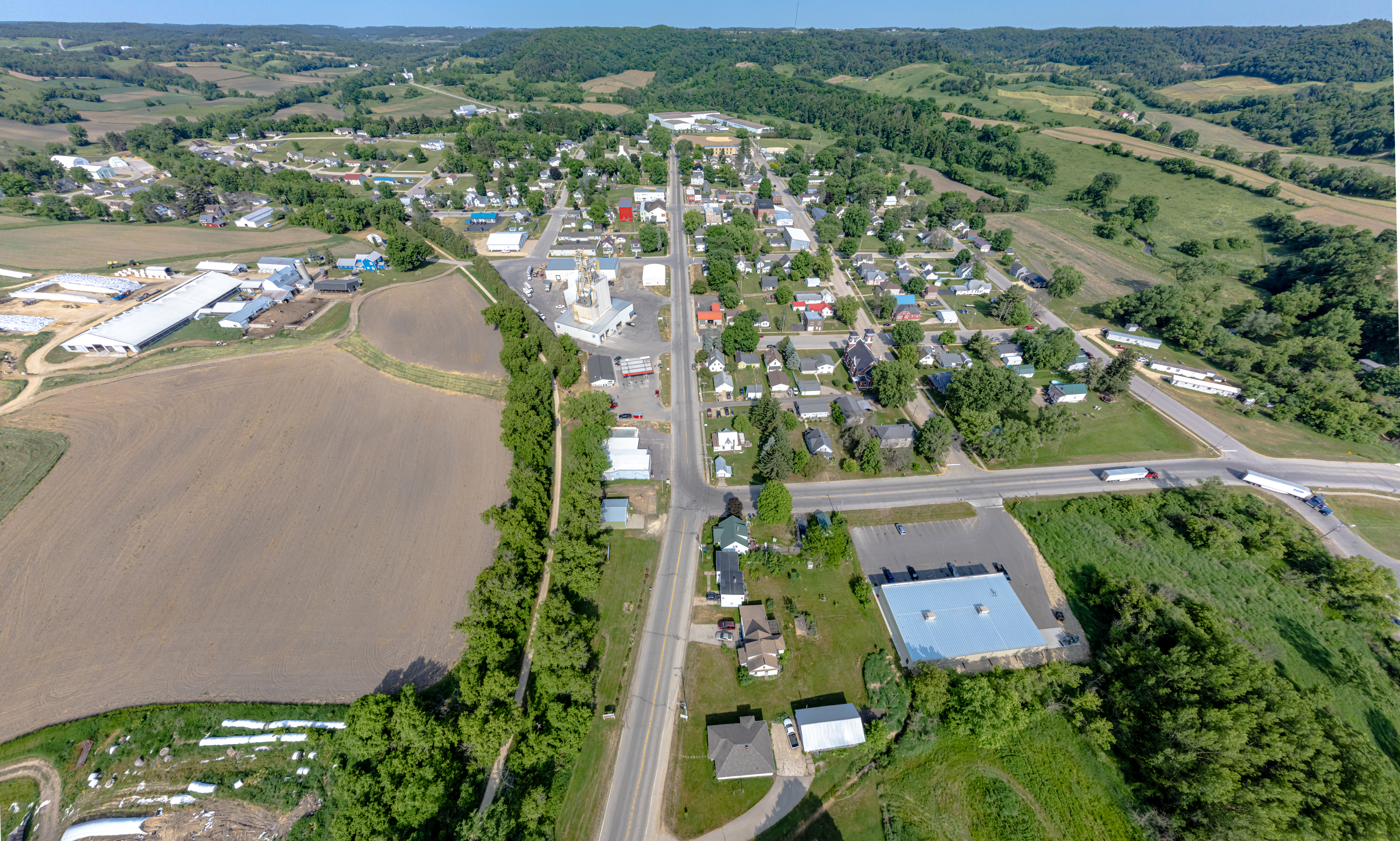

- Location of Wilton in Monroe County, Wisconsin.
- Coordinates: 43°51′13″N 90°29′22″W
- Country: United States
- State: Wisconsin
- County: Monroe

Area
  - Total: 0.89 sq mi (2.31 km^{2})
  - Land: 0.89 sq mi (2.31 km^{2})
  - Water: 0 sq mi (0.00 km^{2})
- Elevation: 1,155 ft (352 m)

Population (2020)
  - Total: 532
  - Density: 596/sq mi (230/km^{2})
- Time zone: UTC-6 (Central (CST))
  - Summer (DST): UTC-5 (CDT)
- Area code: 608
- FIPS code: 55-87550
- GNIS feature ID: 1576838
- Website: https://www.villageofwilton.com/

Wilton is a village in Monroe County, Wisconsin, United States. The population was 532 at the 2020 census. The village is located partially within the Town of Wilton and partially within the Town of Wellington.

== Geography ==
Wilton is located at 43°48′48″N 90°31′43″W (43.813451, -90.528847).

According to the United States Census Bureau, the village has a total area of 0.89 square miles (2.31 km^{2}), all land.

== Demographics ==
Historical population
Census	Pop.	Note	%±
1880	140		—
1900	400		—
1910	510		27.5%
1920	519		1.8%
1930	449		−13.5%
1940	486		8.2%
1950	533		9.7%
1960	578		8.4%
1970	516		−10.7%
1980	465		−9.9%
1990	478		2.8%
2000	519		8.6%
2010	504		−2.9%
2020	532		5.6%
U.S. Decennial Census

=== 2010 census ===
As of the census of 2010, there were 504 people, 203 households, and 130 families living in the village. The population density was 566.3 inhabitants per square mile (218.6/km^{2}). There were 233 housing units at an average density of 261.8 per square mile (101.1/km^{2}). The racial makeup of the village was 93.8% White, 0.4% African American, 1.0% Asian, 3.6% from other races, and 1.2% from two or more races. Hispanic or Latino of any race were 7.3% of the population.

There were 203 households, of which 33.5% had children under the age of 18 living with them, 44.3% were married couples living together, 12.3% had a female householder with no husband present, 7.4% had a male householder with no wife present, and 36.0% were non-families. 30.5% of all households were made up of individuals, and 11.3% had someone living alone who was 65 years of age or older. The average household size was 2.48 and the average family size was 3.03.

The median age in the village was 35.4 years. 29.2% of residents were under the age of 18; 6.6% were between the ages of 18 and 24; 24.4% were from 25 to 44; 26.9% were from 45 to 64; and 12.7% were 65 years of age or older. The gender makeup of the village was 51.8% male and 48.2% female.

=== 2000 census ===
As of the census of 2000, there were 519 people, 214 households, and 121 families living in the village. The population density was 613.6 people per square mile (235.7/km^{2}). There were 233 housing units at an average density of 275.5 per square mile (105.8/km^{2}). The racial makeup of the village was 95.57% White, 3.08% from other races, and 1.35% from two or more races. 8.48% of the population were Hispanic or Latino of any race.

There were 214 households, out of which 32.7% had children under the age of 18 living with them, 39.7% were married couples living together, 9.8% had a female householder with no husband present, and 43.0% were non-families. 37.9% of all households were made up of individuals, and 20.1% had someone living alone who was 65 years of age or older. The average household size was 2.43 and the average family size was 3.19.

In the village, the population was spread out, with 28.3% under the age of 18, 10.0% from 18 to 24, 27.4% from 25 to 44, 19.5% from 45 to 64, and 14.8% who were 65 years of age or older. The median age was 34 years. For every 100 females, there were 110.1 males. For every 100 females age 18 and over, there were 105.5 males.

The median income for a household in the village was $37,721, and the median income for a family was $46,607. Males had a median income of $31,591 versus $22,292 for females. The per capita income for the village was $15,998. About 9.6% of families and 9.7% of the population were below the poverty line, including 4.2% of those under age 18 and 13.4% of those age 65 or over.

== Gallery ==
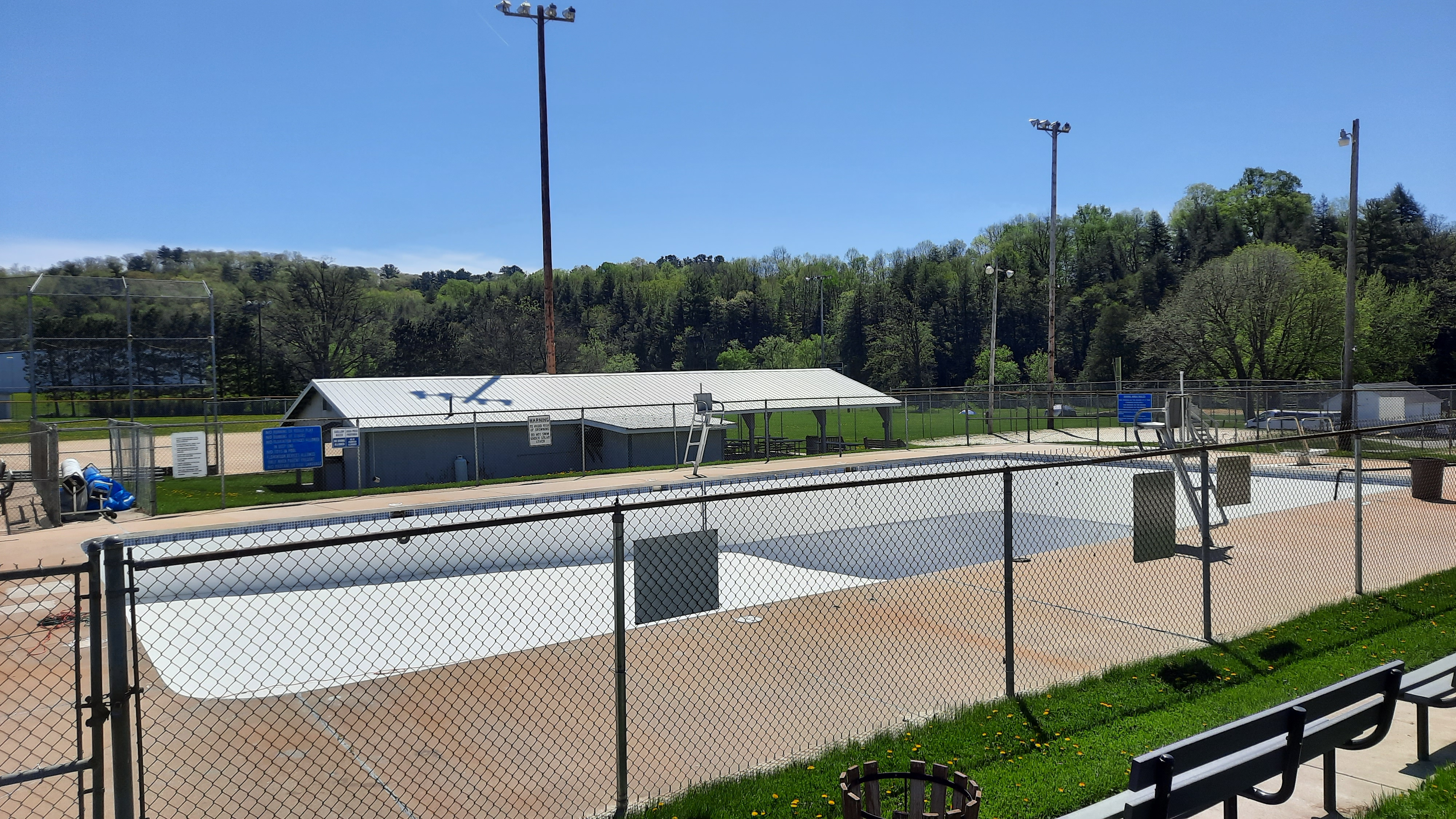
Wilton municipal pool

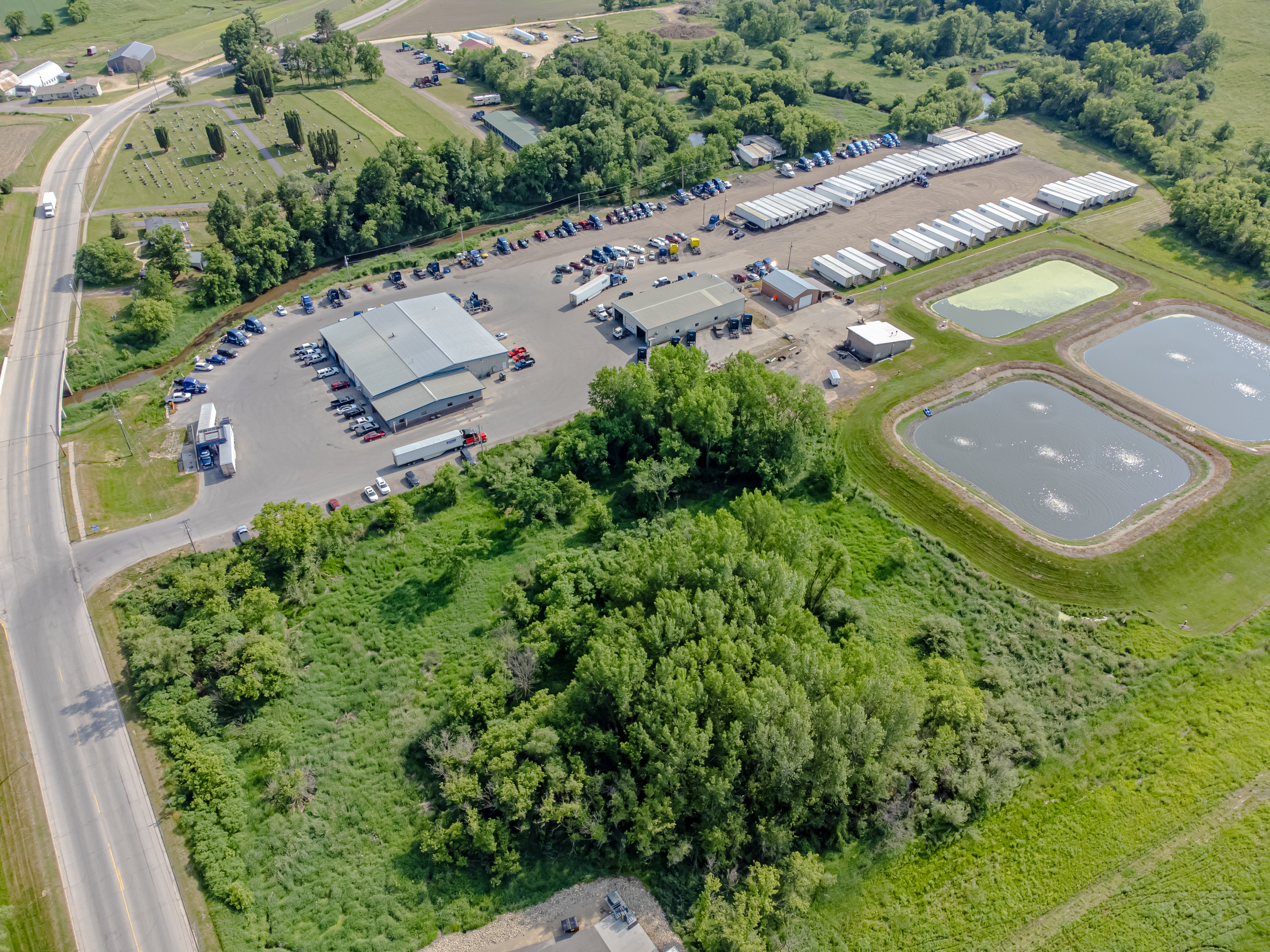
Martins Milk Service

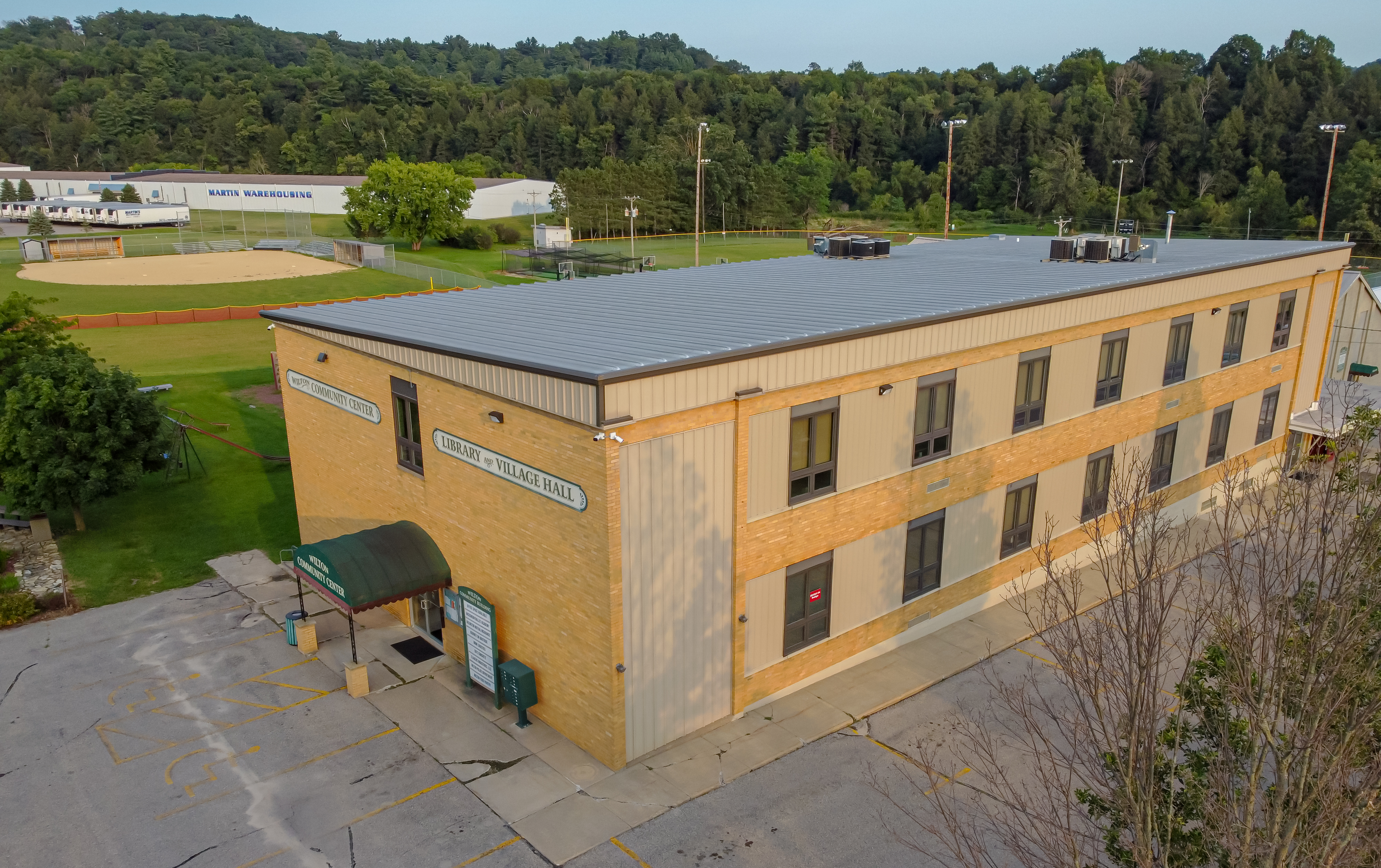
Wilton Village Hall

== See also ==
- List of villages in Wisconsin
