= Norway Baptist Church =

Historic church in New York, United States

- U.S. National Register of Historic Places
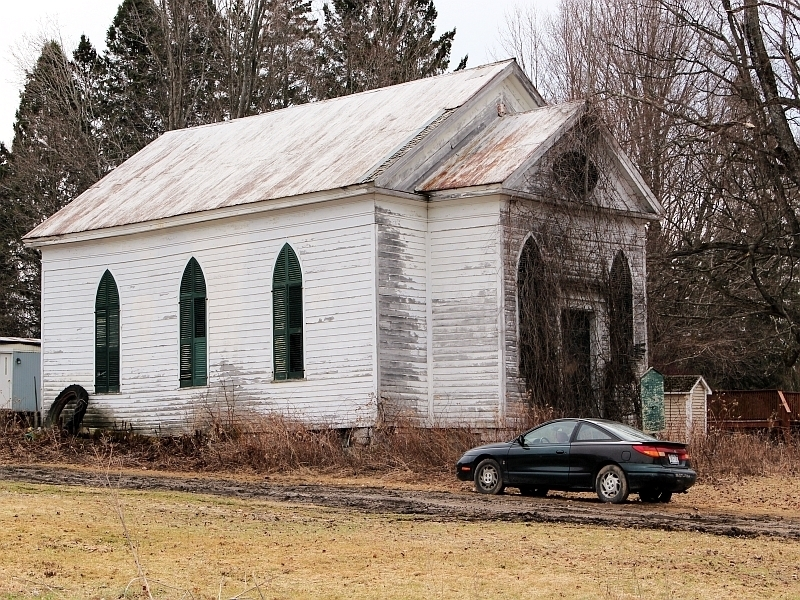

- Location within New York Location within the United States
- Location: 1067 Newport-Gray Rd., Norway, New York
- Coordinates: 43°12′25″N 74°57′11″W
- Area: 1 acre (0.40 ha)
- Built: 1830-1831
- Architect: Crandall, Robert (builder)
- Architectural style: Federal
- NRHP reference No.: 07000622
- Added to NRHP: June 29, 2007

Norway Baptist Church is a historic former Baptist church at 1067 Newport-Gray Road in Norway, Herkimer County, New York. It was built in 1830-1831 and is a rectangular, two story, gable roofed, vernacular Federal building. It features an engaged, two stage bell tower.

It was listed on the National Register of Historic Places in 2007.
