= Connor Prielipp =

American baseball player (born 2001)

Minnesota Twins – No. 61
- Pitcher
- Born: January 10, 2001 (age 25); Tomah, Wisconsin, U.S.
- Bats: Left Throws: Left

MLB debut
- April 22, 2026, for the Minnesota Twins

MLB statistics (through 2026 season)
- Win–loss record: 6–7
- Earned run average: 4.87
- Strikeouts: 128
- Stats at Baseball Reference

Teams
- Minnesota Twins (2026–present)

Connor Francis Prielipp (born January 10, 2001) is an American professional baseball pitcher for the Minnesota Twins of Major League Baseball (MLB). He played college baseball for the Alabama Crimson Tide and was selected by the Twins in the second round of the 2022 Major League Baseball draft. He made his MLB debut in 2026.

== Amateur career ==
Prielipp attended Tomah High School in Tomah, Wisconsin. In 2018, his junior year, he posted a 0.27 ERA with 97 strikeouts over 52 innings. As a senior in 2019, he went 6–2 with a 0.85 ERA, 118 strikeouts, and five walks over 49 innings and was named the Gatorade Wisconsin Baseball Player of the Year. He was selected by the Boston Red Sox in the 37th round of the 2019 Major League Baseball draft, but did not sign and instead enrolled at the University of Alabama to play college baseball.

Prielipp was named Alabama's Opening Day starter as a freshman in 2020. He started four games in which he struck out 35 batters and gave up no earned runs over 21 innings before the season was cancelled due to the COVID-19 pandemic. In 2021, he pitched seven innings. He underwent Tommy John surgery in May and missed the rest of the season. There was a chance Prielipp would be able to return for part of the 2022 season, but he announced that April that he would be opting out and would not play. He instead began throwing bullpen sessions for major league scouts. In June, Prielipp traveled to San Diego where he participated in the Draft Combine.

== Professional career ==
=== Minor leagues ===
The Minnesota Twins selected Prielipp in the second round with the 48th overall selection of the 2022 Major League Baseball draft. He signed with the team for $1.8 million.

The Twins assigned Prielipp to the High-A Cedar Rapids Kernels to open the 2023 season. He pitched in two games before he underwent surgery on his left ulnar collateral ligament, thus ending his season. Prielipp returned to play in 2024, making nine starts between the rookie Florida Complex League Twins, Single-A Fort Myers Miracle, and Cedar Rapids, going 0–1 with a 2.70 ERA and 41 strikeouts over 23 1/3 innings.

Prielipp was assigned to the Double-A Wichita Wind Surge to open the 2025 season. In August, he was promoted to the Triple-A St. Paul Saints. In 24 appearances (23 starts) for the two affiliates, Prielipp compiled a 1–9 record and 4.03 ERA with 98 strikeouts across 82 2/3 innings pitched. On November 18, 2025, the Twins added Prielipp to their 40-man roster to protect him from the Rule 5 draft. Prielipp was optioned to Triple-A St. Paul to begin the 2026 season. He pitched in five games and had a 1.93 ERA and 25 strikeouts over 18 2/3 innings.

=== Major leagues ===
On April 22, 2026, the Twins promoted Preilipp to the major leagues for the first time. He made his MLB debut that night as Minnesota's starting pitcher at Citi Field against the New York Mets. Prielipp pitched four innings and gave up two earned runs, six hits, no walks, and collected six strikeouts in a 3–2 Twins loss. On April 27, Prielipp recorded his first career win after allowing two runs over five innings pitched against the Seattle Mariners. He was placed on the injured list on July 9 with a left finger blister. He was activated on July 26. Prielipp appeared in 24 games (with 22 starts) for the Twins and ended the season with a 6–7 record, a 4.87 ERA and 128 strikeouts across 125 2/3 innings pitched.
