= Dairy Hill =

Mountain in Herkimer County, New York, United States

- Location within New York Location within the United States

Highest point
- Elevation: 1,844 feet (562 m)
- Coordinates: 43°11′28″N 74°53′50″W

Geography
- Location: Southeast of Norway, Herkimer County, New York, U.S.
- Topo map: USGS Middleville

Dairy Hill is a 1,844-foot-tall (562 m) summit located in Central New York Region of New York located in the Town of Norway in Herkimer County, southeast of Norway. The mountain is the former location of a 79-foot-6-inch-tall (24.23 m) steel fire lookout tower.

== History ==
In 1934, the CCC built a 79-foot-6-inch-tall (24.23 m) International Derrick tower on the mountain. It was provided to the state by the United States Forest Service. The tower was first staffed in 1935, reporting 6 fires and 568 visitors. The tower ceased fire lookout operations in 1986. The tower and cabin were later removed because of extreme vandalism of the tower and the site.
