= Bloyer Field =

Airport in Monroe County, Wisconsin

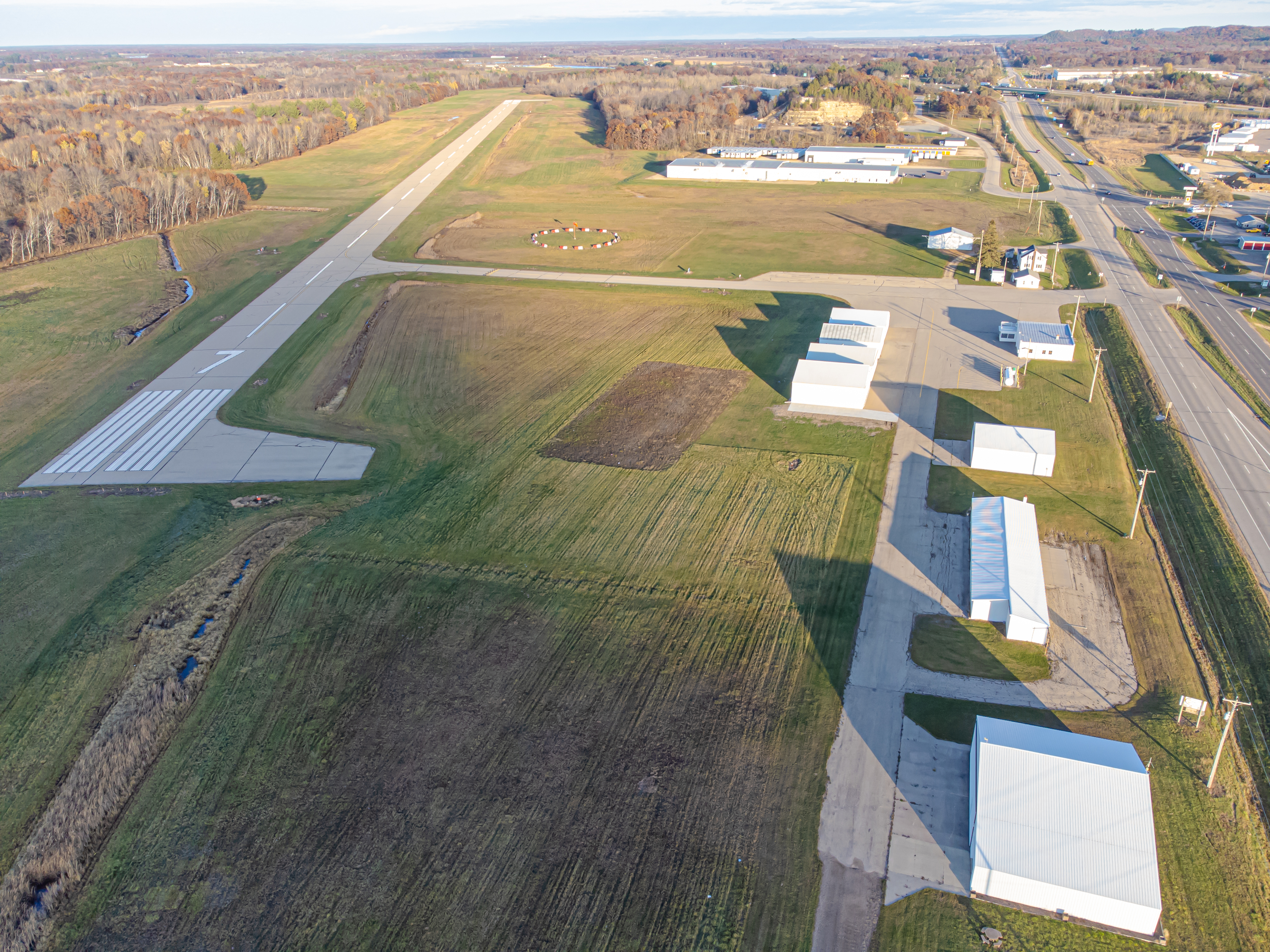
- U.S. 12 and I-90 running by
- IATA: none; ICAO: none; FAA LID: Y72

Summary
- Airport type: Public
- Owner: City of Tomah
- Serves: Tomah, Wisconsin
- Time zone: CST (UTC−06:00)
  - Summer (DST): CDT (UTC−05:00)
- Elevation AMSL: 966 ft (294 m)
- Coordinates: 43°58′34″N 90°28′50″W

Map
- Location of airport in Wisconsin Y72 (the United States)

Runways
Direction	Length		Surface
Direction	ft	m	Surface
7/25	3,900	1,189	Asphalt

Statistics
- Aircraft operations (2022): 3,575
- Based aircraft (2024): 7
- Source: Federal Aviation Administration

Bloyer Field (FAA LID: Y72) is a city owned public use airport located one nautical mile (2 km) east of the central business district of Tomah, a city in Monroe County, Wisconsin, United States. It provides general aviation services.

== History ==
First known as Tomah Army Airfield Technical School, it was activated on November 30, 1942 to conduct technical training for the United States Army Air Forces. 1000 Technical School Squadron (Special) provided technical training including radio interception techniques, radio maintenance and operations to personnel. It functioned as a sub-base of Radio school at Truax Army Airfield at Madison, itself part of Central (later Eastern) Technical Training Command. The school was inactivated on April 1, 1944. The facility was transferred to Air Technical Service Command on April 30, 1944. It was transferred as inactive to the US Army Corps of Engineers on April 1, 1946 for disposition.

The airfield was turned over to civil control though the War Assets Administration (WAA).

== Facilities and aircraft ==
Bloyer Field covers an area of 160 acres (65 ha) at an elevation of 966 feet (294 m) above mean sea level. It has one runway designated 7/25 with an asphalt surface measuring 3,900 by 75 feet (1,189 x 23 m).

For the 12-month period ending June 22, 2022, the airport had 3,575 aircraft operations, an average of 10 per day: 98% general aviation, 1% military and less than 1% air taxi.

In July 2024, there were 7 aircraft based at this airport: 5 single-engine, 1 multi-engine and 1 ultralight.

== See also ==
- List of airports in Wisconsin
- Wisconsin World War II Army Airfields
