= William Washington Howes =

American politician

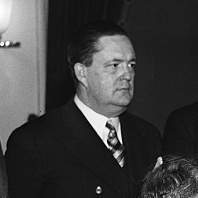
William Washington Howes (December 1933)

William Washington Howes (1887-1962) served under Franklin Delano Roosevelt as Second and First Assistant Postmaster General from 1933 to 1940. Howes brought airmail service to the Midwest. The W W Howes Municipal Airport (now known as Huron Regional Airport) was named in his honor. It is located in Huron, South Dakota. (Source: Howes' grandson, Dr. Whiting Wicker) Previously, he was a member of the South Dakota Senate, Chairman of the South Dakota Democratic Party and a member of the Democratic National Committee. In 1920, he ran for Governor of South Dakota, losing to William H. McMaster.

Howes was born on February 16, 1887, in Tomah, Wisconsin. He died on January 15, 1962, in Washington, D.C.
