= Norway, New York =

- Town
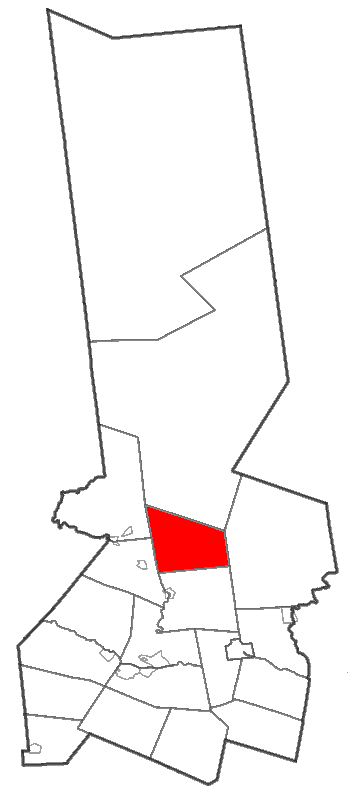
- Location of Norway within Herkimer County

- Location within New York Location within the United States
- Coordinates: 43°12′45″N 74°57′20″W
- Country: United States
- State: New York
- County: Herkimer

Government
  - Type: Town Council
  - Town Supervisor: Judith Gokey (R)
  - Town Council: Members' List: • Scott K. Crossett (R); • Craig Gillespie (R); • James A. Rachon (R); • Perry Siver (R)

Area
  - Total: 35.83 sq mi (92.81 km^{2})
  - Land: 35.56 sq mi (92.10 km^{2})
  - Water: 0.27 sq mi (0.71 km^{2})
- Elevation: 1,526 ft (465 m)

Population (2010)
  - Total: 762
  - Estimate (2016): 769
  - Density: 21.6/sq mi (8.35/km^{2})
- Time zone: UTC-5 (Eastern (EST))
  - Summer (DST): UTC-4 (EDT)
- ZIP Codes: 13416 (Newport); 13324 (Cold Brook)
- FIPS code: 36-043-53968
- GNIS feature ID: 0979295
- Website: www.townofnorway.net

Norway is a town in Herkimer County, New York, United States. The population was 762 at the 2010 census. The town is located in the central part of the county and is northeast of Utica.

The town borders the Adirondack Park.

== History ==
The town was permanently settled around 1787 after an abandoned effort in 1786.

Norway was formed in 1792 from the town of Herkimer immediately after the creation of Herkimer County. Norway was originally a very large town, and it was subsequently broken up, directly or indirectly, into about 36 new towns in several bordering counties. In Herkimer County, the towns of Fairfield (1796), Russia (1806), Ohio (1823), Wilmurt (now defunct), and Webb (1836) were made by dividing Norway. Part of Newport was taken from Norway in 1806. The creation of Oneida County, Lewis County, Clinton County, Hamilton County, and St. Lawrence County from Herkimer County accounts for the remaining towns derived from Norway.

In 1825, the town's population was 1,168.

Because of poor soil conditions, early farmers eventually turned to raising dairy herds. By 1887, there were six cheese factories in Norway.

The former Baptist Church was added to the National Register of Historic Places in 2007.

== Geography ==
According to the United States Census Bureau, the town has a total area of 35.8 square miles (92.8 km^{2}), of which 35.6 square miles (92.1 km^{2}) are land and 0.3 square miles (0.7 km^{2}), or 0.76%, are water.

New York State Route 8 crosses the northwestern part of Norway.

== Demographics ==
Historical population
Census	Pop.	Note	%±
1820	1,613		—
1830	1,152		−28.6%
1840	1,046		−9.2%
1850	1,052		0.6%
1860	1,105		5.0%
1870	1,117		1.1%
1880	1,045		−6.4%
1890	818		−21.7%
1900	680		−16.9%
1910	642		−5.6%
1920	488		−24.0%
1930	482		−1.2%
1940	386		−19.9%
1950	447		15.8%
1960	427		−4.5%
1970	605		41.7%
1980	662		9.4%
1990	663		0.2%
2000	711		7.2%
2010	762		7.2%
2016 (est.)	769		0.9%
U.S. Decennial Census

As of the census of 2000, there were 711 people, 247 households, and 185 families residing in the town. The population density was 20.0 inhabitants per square mile (7.7/km^{2}). There were 311 housing units at an average density of 8.7 per square mile (3.4/km^{2}). The racial makeup of the town was 99.02% White, 0.14% Asian, and 0.84% from two or more races. Hispanic or Latino of any race were 0.42% of the population.

There were 247 households, out of which 34.0% had children under the age of 18 living with them, 59.5% were married couples living together, 9.7% had a female householder with no husband present, and 25.1% were non-families. 19.0% of all households were made up of individuals, and 4.5% had someone living alone who was 65 years of age or older. The average household size was 2.88 and the average family size was 3.21.

In the town, the population was spread out, with 27.6% under the age of 18, 9.0% from 18 to 24, 28.6% from 25 to 44, 27.7% from 45 to 64, and 7.2% who were 65 years of age or older. The median age was 36 years. For every 100 females, there were 116.8 males. For every 100 females age 18 and over, there were 116.4 males.

The median income for a household in the town was $36,719, and the median income for a family was $41,250. Males had a median income of $29,375 versus $23,846 for females. The per capita income for the town was $15,396. About 6.3% of families and 10.1% of the population were below the poverty line, including 17.3% of those under age 18 and 8.3% of those age 65 or over.

== Notable people ==
- David Legge Brainard, United States Army officer and explorer
- Charles S. Millington, politician
- Archibald Nichols, politician
- George R. Vincent, politician

== Communities and locations in Norway ==
- Black Creek Reservoir – A reservoir in the northern part of the town.
- Dairy Hill – An elevation in the southeastern part of the town.
- Gray – A hamlet near the northern town line on County Road 48.
- Hurricane – A hamlet in the northwestern part of the town on NY-8.
- Norway (hamlet) – The hamlet of Norway is near the center of the town.
