= Tomah Public Library =

- U.S. National Register of Historic Places
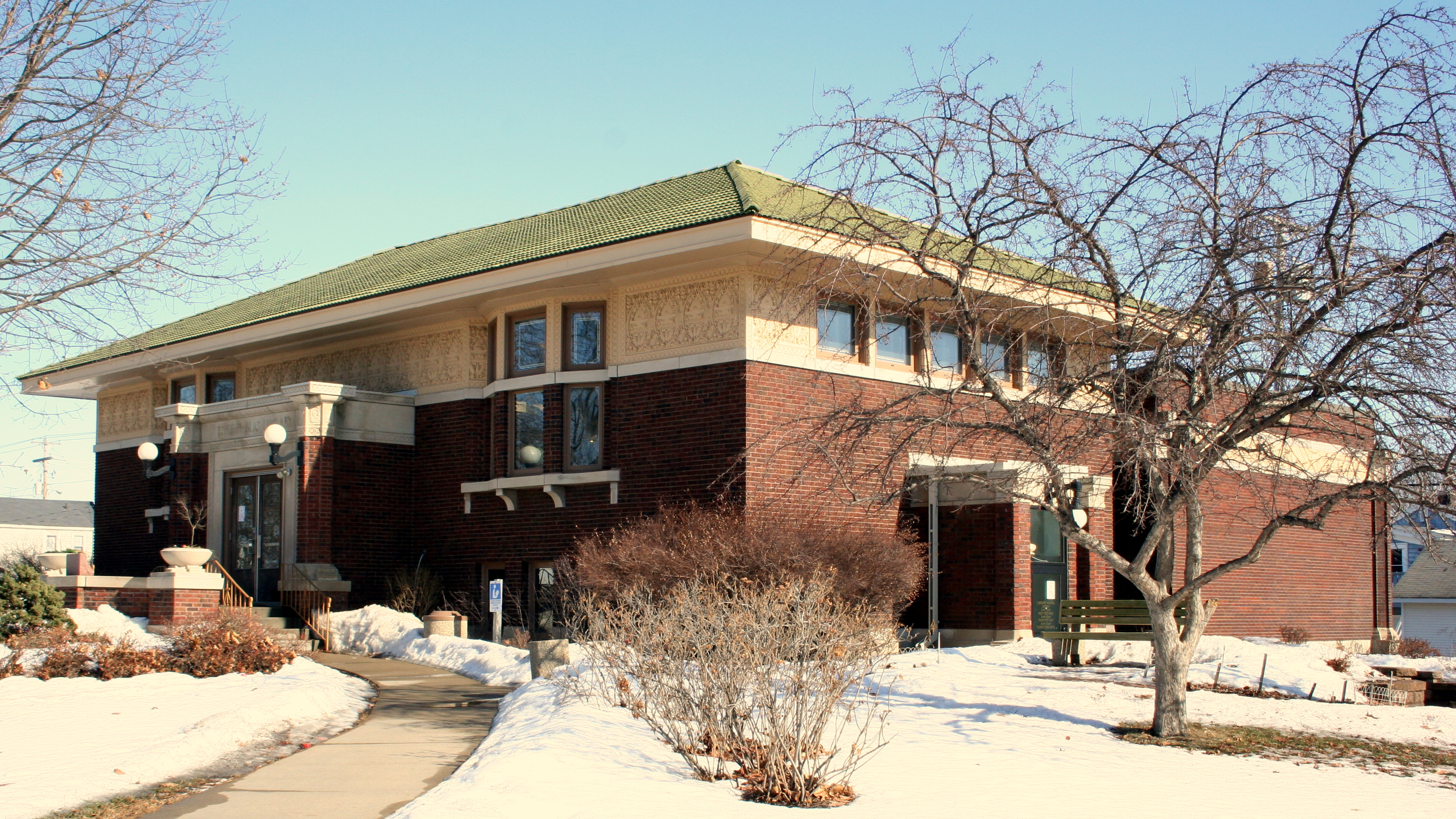
- Tomah Public Library
- Location: 716 Superior Ave. Tomah, Wisconsin
- Coordinates: 43.97985°N 90.50419°W
- Built: 1915
- Architect: Claude and Starck
- Architectural style: Prairie School
- NRHP reference No.: 76000068
- Added to NRHP: May 28, 1976

The Tomah Public Library is located in Tomah, Wisconsin. It was added to the National Register of Historic Places in 1976.

== History ==
The library was constructed in 1915 to serve the City of Tomah and the surrounding area. It is a Carnegie library. In 1911 Ernest Buckley, who was a successful geologist, left the city of Tomah $12,000 to be used for a park or library. The city leaders set aside $7,000 for a library and requested a grant of $10,000 from the Carnegie Foundation. In 1915 they received the grant and secured the services of Claude and Starck. Unlike the typical Sullivanesque ornament, which is made of glazed terra cotta, the Tomah library's frieze is made of staff, a mixture of gypsum and fiber. In 1980 the original building was added onto, nearly doubling in size.
