= Tomah Area School District =

School district in Wisconsin, United States

Address
- 129 West Clifton Street Tomah, Wisconsin, 54660; United States

District information
- Type: Public
- Grades: PreK–12
- NCES District ID: 5514910

Students and staff
- Students: 3,041 (2020–2021)
- Teachers: 226.38 (on an FTE basis)
- Staff: 219.38 (on an FTE basis)
- Student–teacher ratio: 13.43:1

Other information
- Website: www.tomah.education

Tomah Area School District is the school district serving Tomah, Wisconsin and surrounding areas.

== Schools ==
=== Elementary schools ===
- Camp Douglas Elementary (grades 3–5)
- LaGrange Elementary (grades 4K-5)
- Lemonweir Elementary (grades 4K-5)
- Miller Elementary (grades K-5)
- Oakdale Elementary (grades 4K-2)
- Tomah Area Montessori School (grades 4K-6)
- Warrens Elementary (grades 4K-5)
- Wyeville Elementary (grades K-5)

=== Middle school ===
- Tomah Middle School (grades 6–8)

=== High school ===
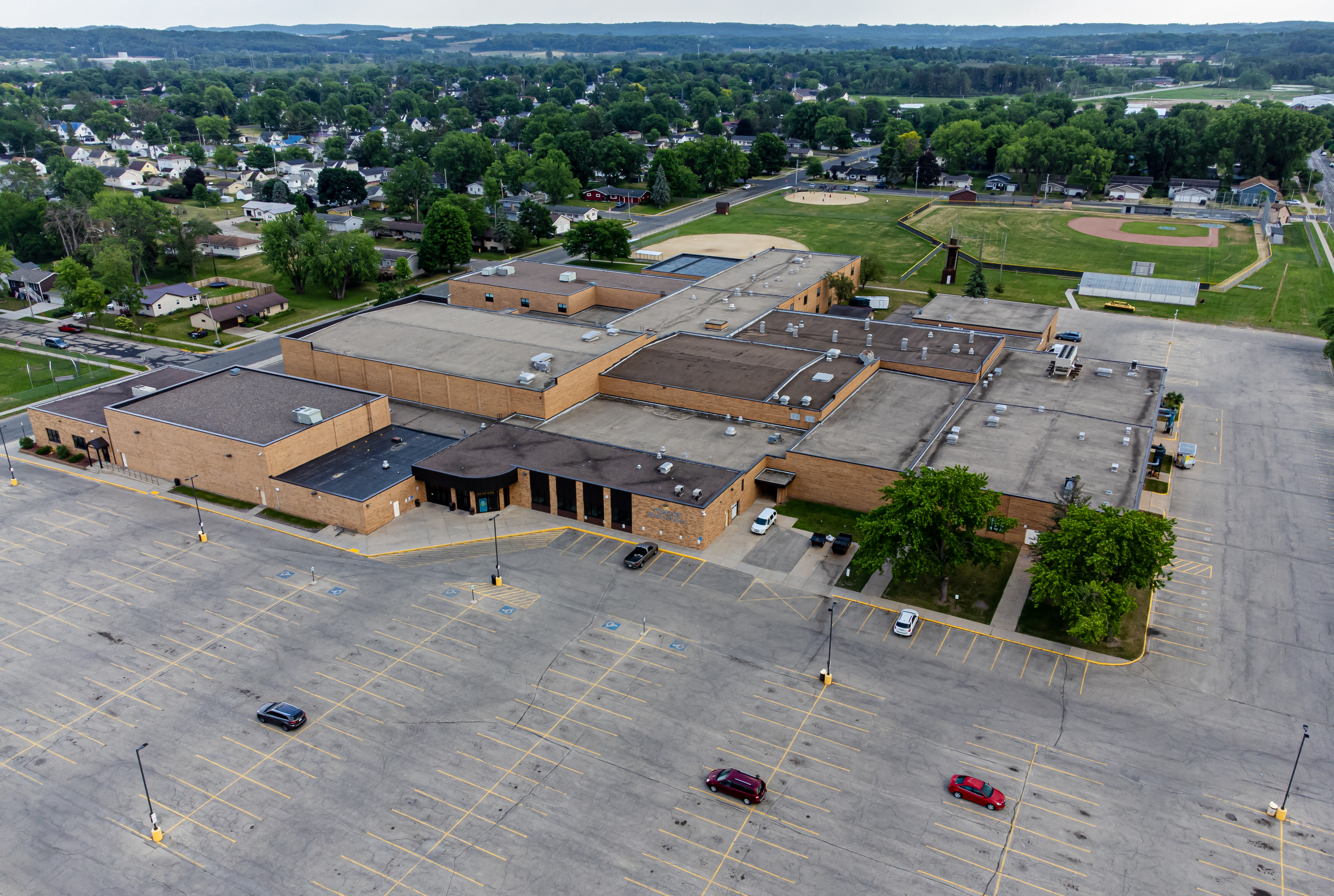
Tomah High School

- Tomah High School (grades 9–12)

Tomah High School is located on 901 Lincoln Avenue in Tomah, Wisconsin.

Tomah High School offers honors and advanced placement classes. It has a pre-engineering program called "Project Lead the Way". The ACE Academy allows students to participate in architecture, construction, and engineering. The Jobs for America's Graduates Program (JAG) allows students to gain useful employment experience. A medical pathway CNA course is also offered.

German, Spanish, and Ho-Chunk languages are taught.

THS offers art classes, including AP art, graphic art, and media productions.

==== Extracurricular activities ====
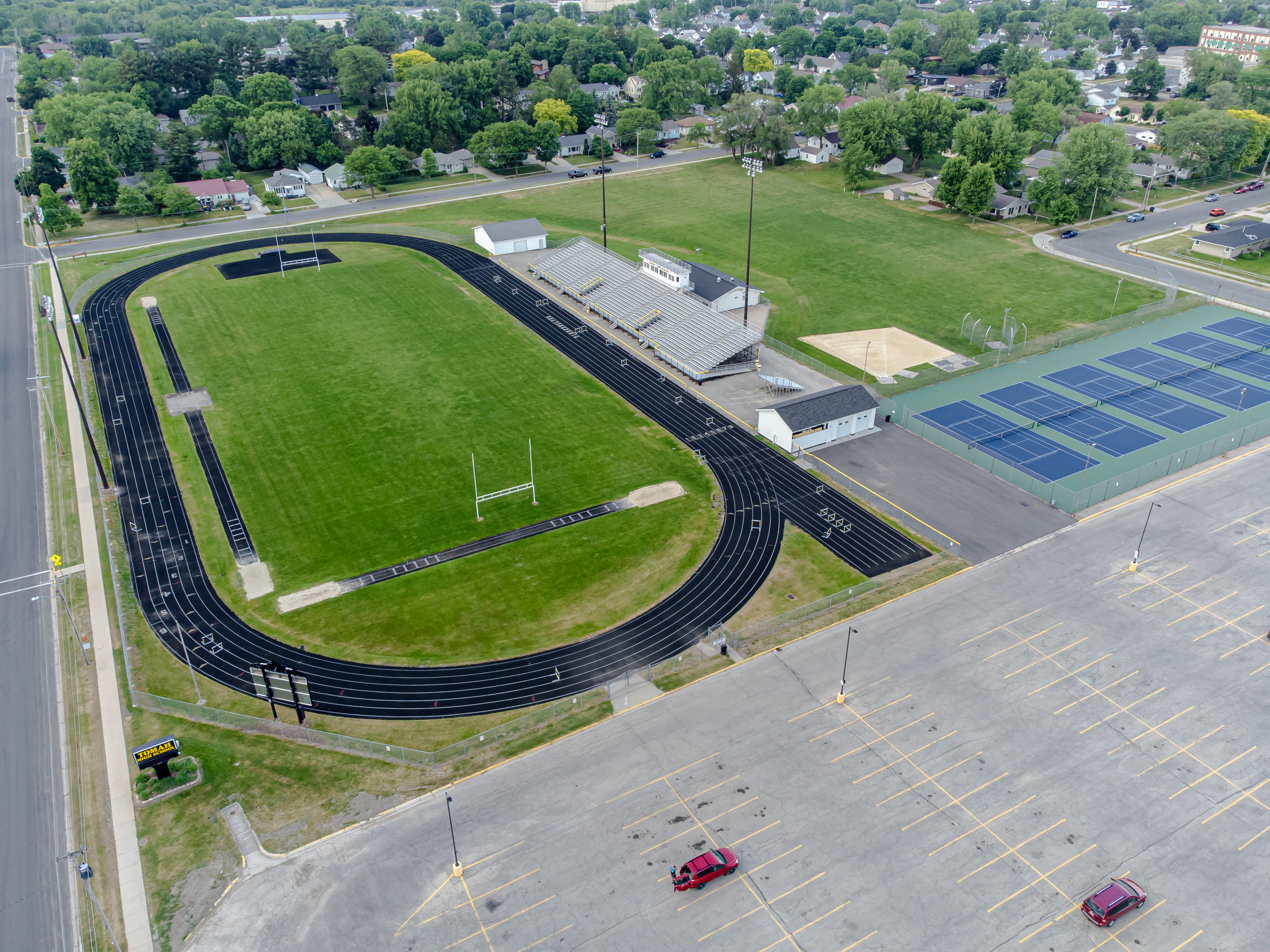
Tomah High School sports facilities

Tomah Area School District is a part of the Mississippi Valley Conference (MVC). The school's athletic teams are known as the Timberwolves. Sports offered include:

Athletics:

- Baseball
- Basketball
- Bowling
- Cheerleading
- Cross country
- Dance
- Football
- Golf
- Gymnastics
- Hockey
- Horsemanship
- Powerlifting
- Rodeo
- Skiing
- Snowboarding
- Soccer
- Softball
- Special Olympics
- Tennis
- Track and Field
- Volleyball
- Wrestling

Extracurricular activities include:

- DECA
- FFA
- HOSA
- Choir
- Band
- Jazz Band
- Musical
- Show Choir
- Show Band
- Academic Decathlon
- Service organizations
- Student government
- Leadership groups

Tomah High School's band performed in the 2015 Outback Bowl in Tampa, Florida. More than 100 students participate in band.

Tomah High School show choir and show band, collectively named "Limited Edition," competes and performs throughout the Midwest. The group began in September 1984. In March, 2024, they competed in the FAME Show Choir Nationals in Branson, Missouri, at which they were awarded Grand Champions, as well as Best Band and Best Choreography. Notably, they competed against neighboring town Sparta High School's Upstage Adrenaline, who earned second place after submitting an application to be invited to the Nationals later in the season. Limited Edition is famous for having an extremely involved community of alumni, parents, family members, and other supporters.

== Notable alumni ==
- Connor Prielipp, Major League Baseball player for the Minnesota Twins
