= Wilton (town), Wisconsin =

Town in Monroe County, Wisconsin

Wilton, Wisconsin
- Town
- Town of Wilton
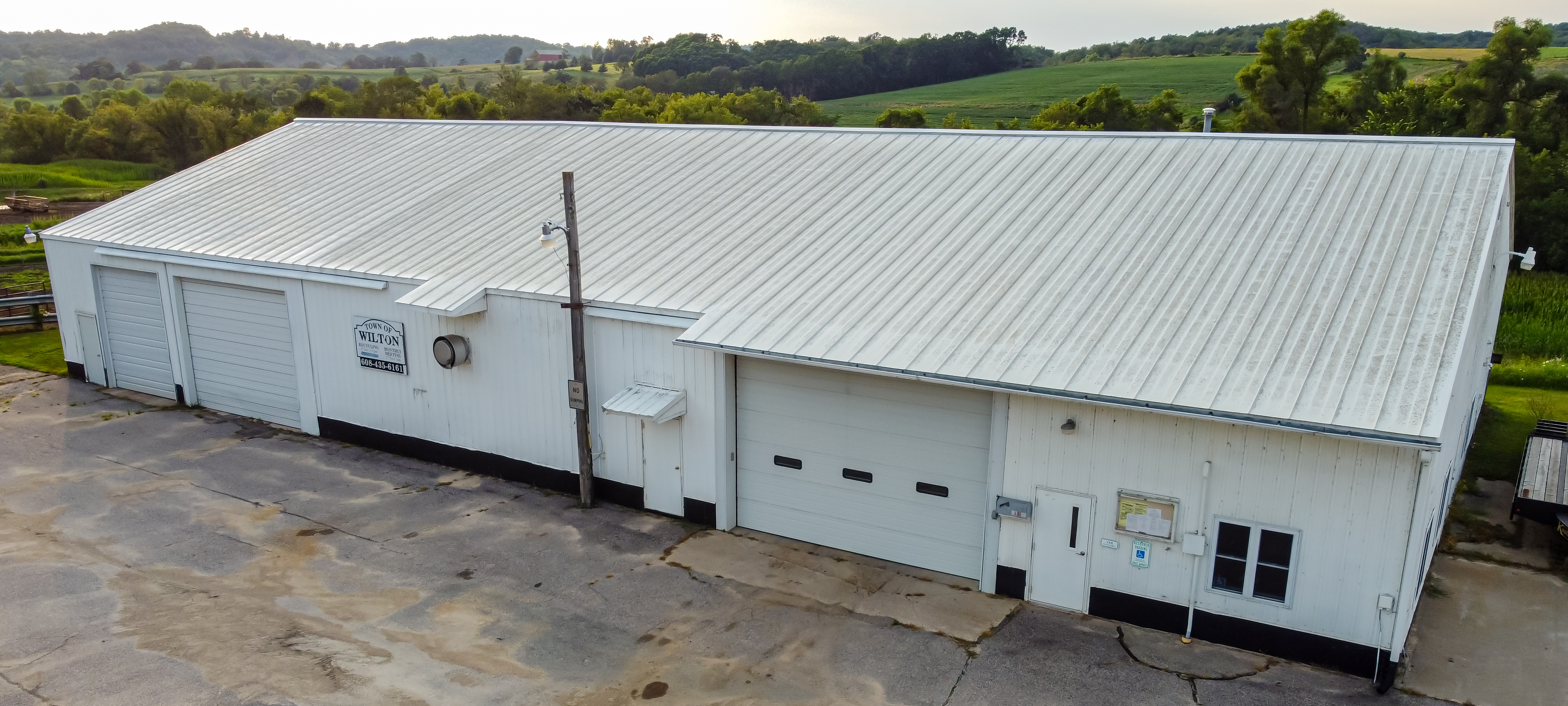
- Wilton Town Hall to the east of Wilton on Wis-71/131

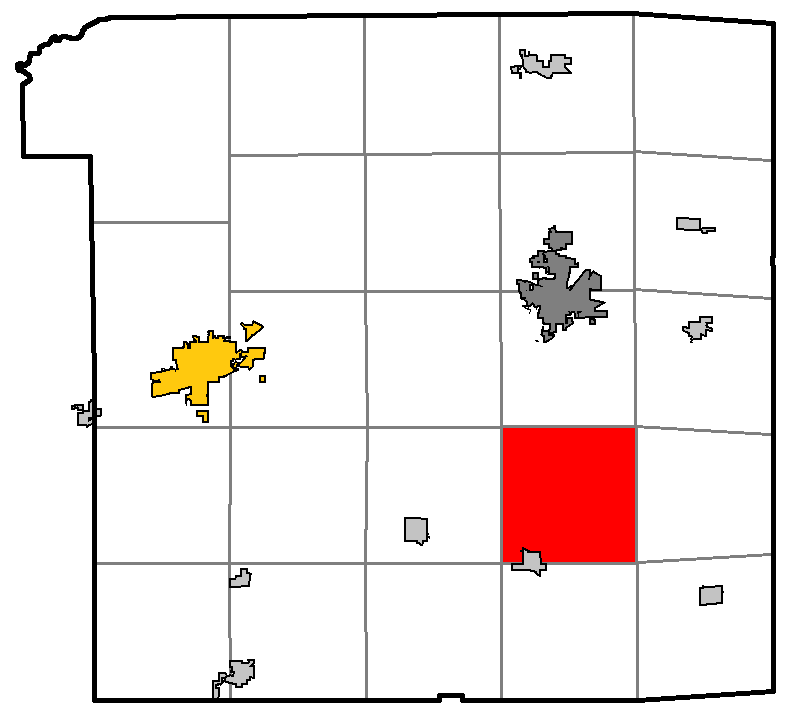
- Location of Wilton, Monroe County

- Location of Monroe County, Wisconsin
- Coordinates: 43°51′24″N 90°29′33″W
- Country: United States
- State: Wisconsin
- County: Monroe

Area
  - Total: 34.89 sq mi (90.4 km^{2})
  - Land: 34.89 sq mi (90.4 km^{2})
  - Water: 0 sq mi (0 km^{2})

Population (2020)
  - Total: 963
  - Density: 27.6/sq mi (10.7/km^{2})
- Time zone: UTC-6 (Central (CST))
  - Summer (DST): UTC-5 (CDT)
- Area code(s): 608 and 353
- GNIS feature ID: 1584450
- Website: https://www.townofwiltonwi.com/

Wilton is a town in Monroe County, Wisconsin, United States. It is located in the Driftless Area, near the Kickapoo River. The Village of Wilton is located partially within the town.

== Geography ==
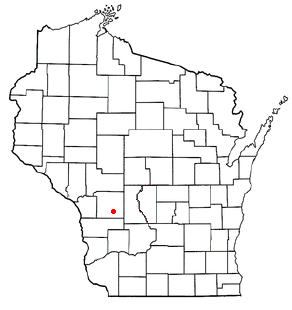
Location of Wilton (town), Wisconsin

According to the United States Census Bureau, the town has a total area of 35.0 square miles (91 km^{2}), all land.

== Demographics ==
=== Demographics in 2020 ===
At the 2020 United States census, there were 963 people in 297 households, including 268 families, in the town. The median household income was estimated to be $77,500. The employment rate was estimated to be 54.3%, with 13.8% of the town having a Bachelor's degree or higher. 31.0% of the population was living below the poverty line.

=== Demographics in 2000 ===
At the 2000 United States census, there were 925 people in 238 households, including 211 families, in the town. The population density was 26.5 per square mile (10.2/km^{2}). There were 265 housing units at an average density of 7.6 per square mile (2.9/km^{2}). The racial make-up of the town was 99.35% White, 0.54% Asian, and 0.11% from two or more races. None of the population were Hispanic or Latino of any race. Of the 238 households, 47.1% had children under the age of 18 living with them, 78.6% were married couples living together, 5.5% had a female householder with no husband present, and 11.3% were non-families. 8.4% of households were one person and 3.4% were one person aged 65 or older. The average household size was 3.89 and the average family size was 4.14.

The age distribution was 42.9% under the age of 18, 7.8% from 18 to 24, 26.1% from 25 to 44, 14.7% from 45 to 64 and 8.5% 65 or older. The median age was 24 years. For every 100 females, there were 112.2 males. For every 100 females age 18 and over, there were 111.2 males.

The median household income was $27,917 and the median family income was $29,625. Males had a median income of $20,893 and females $20,227. The per capita income was $10,498. About 31.2% of families and 45.6% of the population were below the poverty line, including 69.6% of those under age 18 and 11.5% of those age 65 or over.
