= Miles Hineman =

American politician

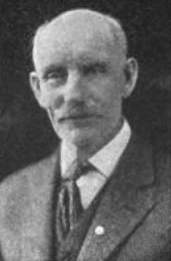

Member of the Wisconsin State Assembly
- In office 1887, 1917, 1919

Personal details
- Born: Miles Leroy Hineman; November 26, 1851 Dunkirk, Wisconsin, US
- Died: August 1, 1930 (aged 78) La Crosse, Wisconsin, US
- Party: Republican
- Spouse: Elizabeth Ann Rowan (m. 1879)
- Children: 6

Miles Leroy Hineman (November 26, 1851 – August 1, 1930) was a member of the Wisconsin State Assembly.

== Biography ==
Hineman was born on November 26, 1851, in Dunkirk, Wisconsin. In 1879, he married Elizabeth Ann Rowan. They had six children. Hineman died on August 1, 1930, in La Crosse, Wisconsin and was buried in Tomah, Wisconsin.

== Career ==
Hineman was first elected to the Assembly in 1886, and later re-elected in 1916 and 1918. Additionally, he was a member of the Tomah Common Council and the Monroe County, Wisconsin Board. He was a Republican.
