= Tomah, Wisconsin =

- City
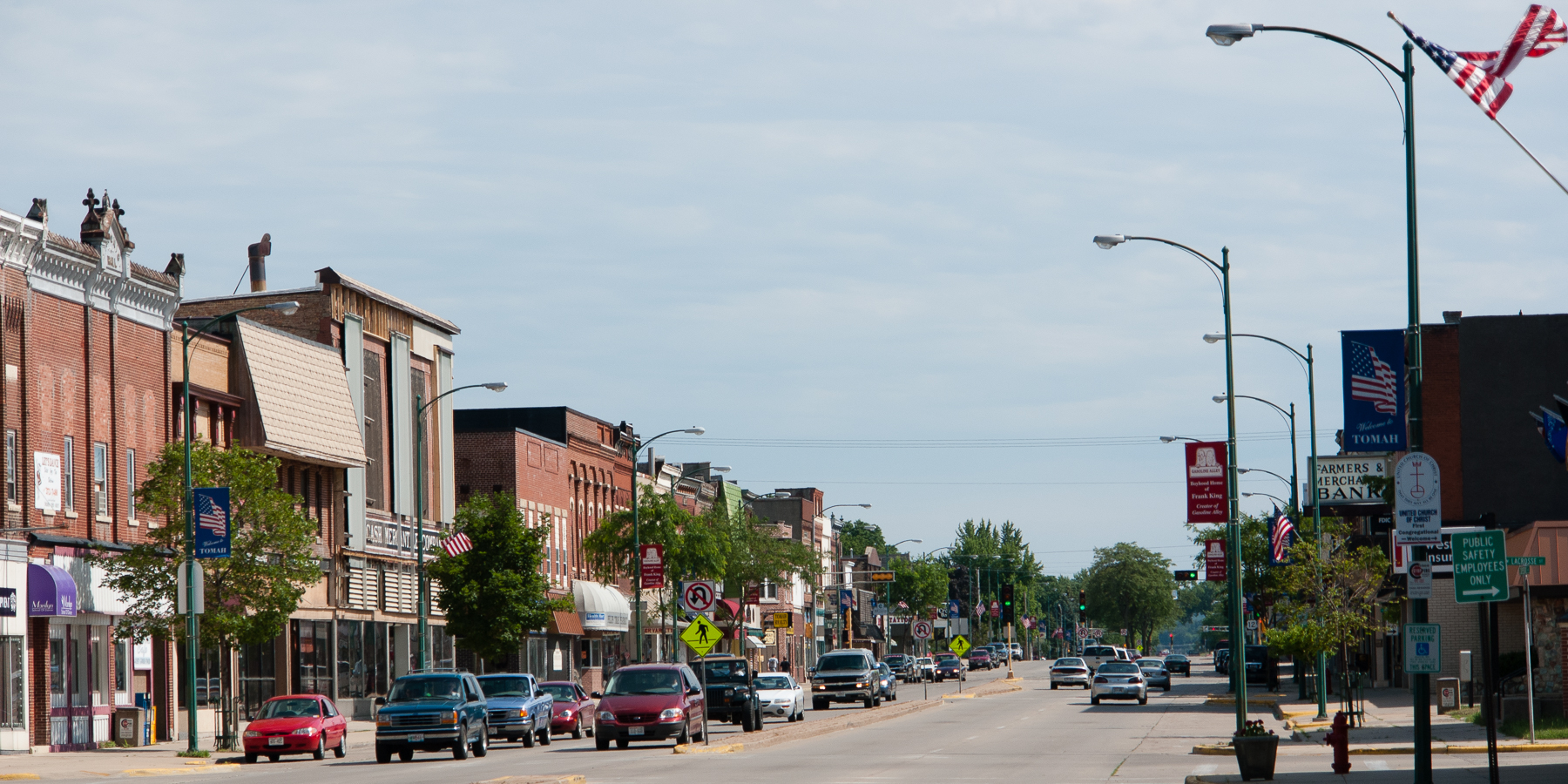
- Downtown Tomah
- Interactive map of Tomah, Wisconsin
- Location within Wisconsin Location within the United States
- Coordinates: 43°59′6″N 90°30′14″W
- Country: United States
- State: Wisconsin
- County: Monroe
- Established: 1855

Government
  - Mayor: Paul Dwyer

Area
  - Total: 8.26 sq mi (21.39 km^{2})
  - Land: 7.84 sq mi (20.30 km^{2})
  - Water: 0.42 sq mi (1.10 km^{2})

Population (2020)
  - Total: 9,570
  - Density: 1,221.1/sq mi (471.5/km^{2})
- Time zone: UTC-6 (Central (CST))
  - Summer (DST): UTC-5 (CDT)
- ZIP codes: 54660
- Area code: 608
- FIPS code: 55-80075
- Website: https://www.tomahwi.gov/

Tomah is a city in Monroe County, Wisconsin, United States. The population was 9,570 as of the 2020 census. The city is surrounded by the Town of Tomah and the Town of La Grange.

== History ==
Tomah was founded by Robert E. Gillett in 1855 and incorporated as a city in 1883, but the charter was not issued until 1894. It is named after Thomas Carron (ca. 1752–1818), a trader at Green Bay who had integrated into the Menominee tribe. The Menominees pronounced the name Tomah or Tomau and he became known as Chief Tomah. Tomah was adopted as the name for the settlement in Monroe County on the unsubstantiated belief that Chief Tomah had once held a tribal gathering in the area.

In 1891, construction began in Tomah for a Native American residential school funded by the federal government. The Tomah Indian Industrial School opened in 1893 with six Ho-Chunk children as its first students and would become the most significant residential school in Wisconsin. The curriculum was designed to assimilate students into white American culture by replacing their indigenous education with Christian, English-language education. Children were forcibly removed from their families and sent to the school from as far away as North Dakota and Oklahoma. The school operated until 1941. A 2024 report from the Department of the Interior noted that two students who died during their time at the school have been identified.

Tomah has three landmarks on the National Register of Historic Places: the old Tomah Post Office at 903 Superior Avenue, the Tomah Public Library at 716 Superior Avenue, and the Tomah Boy Scout Cabin at 415 E. Council Street.

== Geography ==
Tomah is located on the South Fork of the Lemonweir River, a main tributary of the Lemonweir River, which is a large tributary of the lower Wisconsin River. The river is impounded on the west side of the city, forming Lake Tomah. Council Creek flows north through the east side of the city to meet the river.

The city is at the boundary between the hills of the Driftless Area in southwest Wisconsin and the flat, sandy, poorly drained ancient bed of Glacial Lake Wisconsin extending to the north and east of the city. The city's geographic coordinates are 43°59′6″N 90°30′14″W (43.985089, -90.503922).

According to the United States Census Bureau, the city has a total area of 7.86 square miles (20.36 km^{2}), of which 7.46 square miles (19.32 km^{2}) is land and 0.40 square miles (1.04 km^{2}) is water.

== Demographics ==
Historical population
Census	Pop.	Note	%±
1870	837		—
1880	1,245		48.7%
1890	2,199		76.6%
1900	2,840		29.1%
1910	3,419		20.4%
1920	3,257		−4.7%
1930	3,354		3.0%
1940	3,817		13.8%
1950	4,760		24.7%
1960	5,321		11.8%
1970	5,647		6.1%
1980	7,204		27.6%
1990	7,570		5.1%
2000	8,419		11.2%
2010	9,093		8.0%
2020	9,570		5.2%
U.S. Decennial Census

=== 2020 census ===
As of the census of 2020, the population was 9,570. The population density was 1,221.1 inhabitants per square mile (471.5/km^{2}). There were 4,456 housing units at an average density of 568.6 per square mile (219.5/km^{2}). The racial makeup of the city was 85.8% White, 3.2% Black or African American, 2.1% Native American, 1.5% Asian, 0.3% Pacific Islander, 1.6% from other races, and 5.7% from two or more races. Ethnically, the population was 4.7% Hispanic or Latino of any race.

According to the American Community Survey estimates for 2016–2020, the median income for a household in the city was $51,304, and the median income for a family was $63,940. Male full-time workers had a median income of $44,787 versus $41,372 for female workers. The per capita income for the city was $31,656. About 5.5% of families and 6.7% of the population were below the poverty line, including 5.5% of those under age 18 and 6.5% of those age 65 or over. Of the population age 25 and over, 92.3% were high school graduates or higher and 23.3% had a bachelor's degree or higher.

=== 2010 census ===
At the 2010 census there were 9,093 people in 3,900 households, including 2,194 families, in the city. The population density was 1,218.9 inhabitants per square mile (470.6/km^{2}). There were 4,196 housing units at an average density of 562.5 per square mile (217.2/km^{2}). The racial makeup of the city was 90.9% White, 2.6% African American, 1.7% Native American, 1.2% Asian, 0.3% Pacific Islander, 1.1% from other races, and 2.2% from two or more races. Hispanic or Latino people of any race were 4.0%.

Of the 3,900 households 31.3% had children under the age of 18 living with them, 38.3% were married couples living together, 13.0% had a female householder with no husband present, 5.0% had a male householder with no wife present, and 43.7% were non-families. 37.6% of households were one person and 14.4% were one person aged 65 or older. The average household size was 2.25 and the average family size was 2.96.

The median age was 38 years. 24.9% of residents were under the age of 18; 7.5% were between the ages of 18 and 24; 26.3% were from 25 to 44; 26.2% were from 45 to 64; and 15.2% were 65 or older. The gender makeup of the city was 50.2% male and 49.8% female.

=== 2000 census ===
At the 2000 census there were 8,419 people in 3,451 households, including 2,098 families, in the city. The population density was 1,148.2 people per square mile (443.5/km^{2}). There were 3,706 housing units at an average density of 505.4 per square mile (195.2/km^{2}). The racial makeup of the city was 94.95% White, 1.03% Black or African American, 1.65% Native American, 0.67% Asian, 0.08% Pacific Islander, 0.46% from other races, and 1.15% from two or more races. 1.41% of the population were Hispanic or Latino of any race. Of the 3,451 households 31.7% had children under the age of 18 living with them, 45.2% were married couples living together, 11.4% had a female householder with no husband present, and 39.2% were non-families. 33.6% of households were one person and 15.0% were one person aged 65 or older. The average household size was 2.31 and the average family size was 2.96.

The age distribution was 25.8% under the age of 18, 8.0% from 18 to 24, 26.5% from 25 to 44, 22.0% from 45 to 64, and 17.7% 65 or older. The median age was 38 years. For every 100 females, there were 97.9 males. For every 100 females age 18 and over, there were 95.2 males.

== Parks and recreation ==
Tomah has 11 parks, a citywide recreation trail, and an aquatic center. The Tomah Parks and Recreation Department administers recreational programs for youth and adults.

== Education ==
Tomah is served by the Tomah Area School District, which has more than 3,000 students. The district administers seven elementary schools, a middle school, a high school, an alternative school, and a Montessori Public Charter School (grades 4K-3). There are two private schools in Tomah: Queen of the Apostles (grades 4K-8) and St. Paul Lutheran School of the Wisconsin Evangelical Lutheran Synod (grades preK-8).

== Transportation ==
Tomah is a regional transportation hub because of its location at the intersection of Interstate 90 and Interstate 94. Interstate 90 continues west to La Crosse and Interstate 94 heads north to Eau Claire and Minneapolis–Saint Paul. Tomah is also the junction of U.S. Highway 12 and state highways 16, 21, and 131.

Tomah is served by freight and passenger railroads Canadian Pacific, Union Pacific, and Amtrak. Tomah station serves Amtrak's Empire Builder and Borealis trains. Both run once per day in each direction; the Empire Builder from Chicago to the west coast, and the Borealis from Chicago to Saint Paul. Bloyer Field airport (Y72), located one mile east of Tomah, serves the city.

Commuter bus service to La Crosse is provided three times daily by Scenic Mississippi Regional Transit. Greyhound Lines has an intercity bus stop in Tomah. Within the city, the Tomah Shared Ride Taxi provides demand-response service.

== Health care ==
Four health care facilities are located in Tomah: Tomah Health, Gundersen Health, the Tomah VA Medical Center, and the Lake Tomah Clinic of Mayo Health System.

== Notable people ==
- Adelbert Bleekman, Wisconsin State Senator
- Herbert Eugene Bolton, Spanish borderlands scholar and director of the Bancroft Library; graduated from Tomah High School
- Charles K. Erwin, Wisconsin State Senator
- Anne Nicol Gaylor, advocate
- Glenn L. Henry, lawyer and member of the Wisconsin State Assembly
- Jay R. Hinckley, member of the Wisconsin State Assembly
- Miles Hineman, member of the Wisconsin State Assembly
- William Washington Howes, first Assistant Postmaster General of the United States
- Kyle Kenyon, lawyer and legislator
- Frank King, creator of the comic strip Gasoline Alley; grew up in Tomah.
- Frank Augustus Miller, builder of the Mission Inn in Riverside, California
- Lewis T. Mittness, member of the Wisconsin State Assembly
- Connor Prielipp, major league baseball player
- Charles Quigg, member of the Wisconsin State Assembly and physician
- Arthur Claude Ruge, engineer
- John Emmet Sheridan, illustrator, was born in Tomah.
- Kenneth E. Stumpf, Congressional Medal of Honor recipient
- Ed Thompson, old mayor of Tomah, Wisconsin gubernatorial candidate, State Senate candidate
- Bert D. Thorp, member of the Wisconsin State Assembly
- James Tormey, member of the Wisconsin State Assembly
- Lynn Pulou-Alaimalo, author and first Samoan female educator in Tomah

== Gallery ==
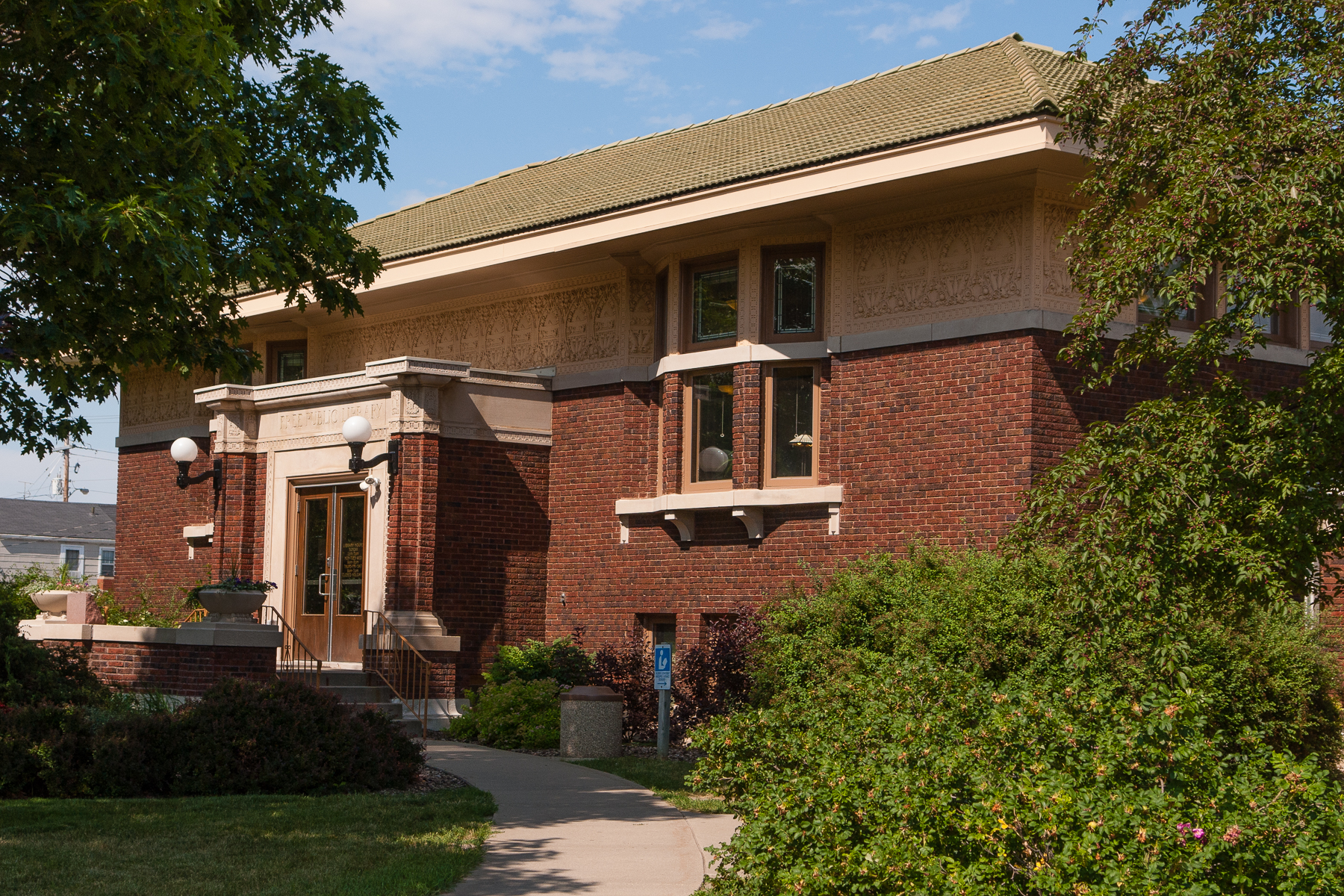
Tomah Public Library

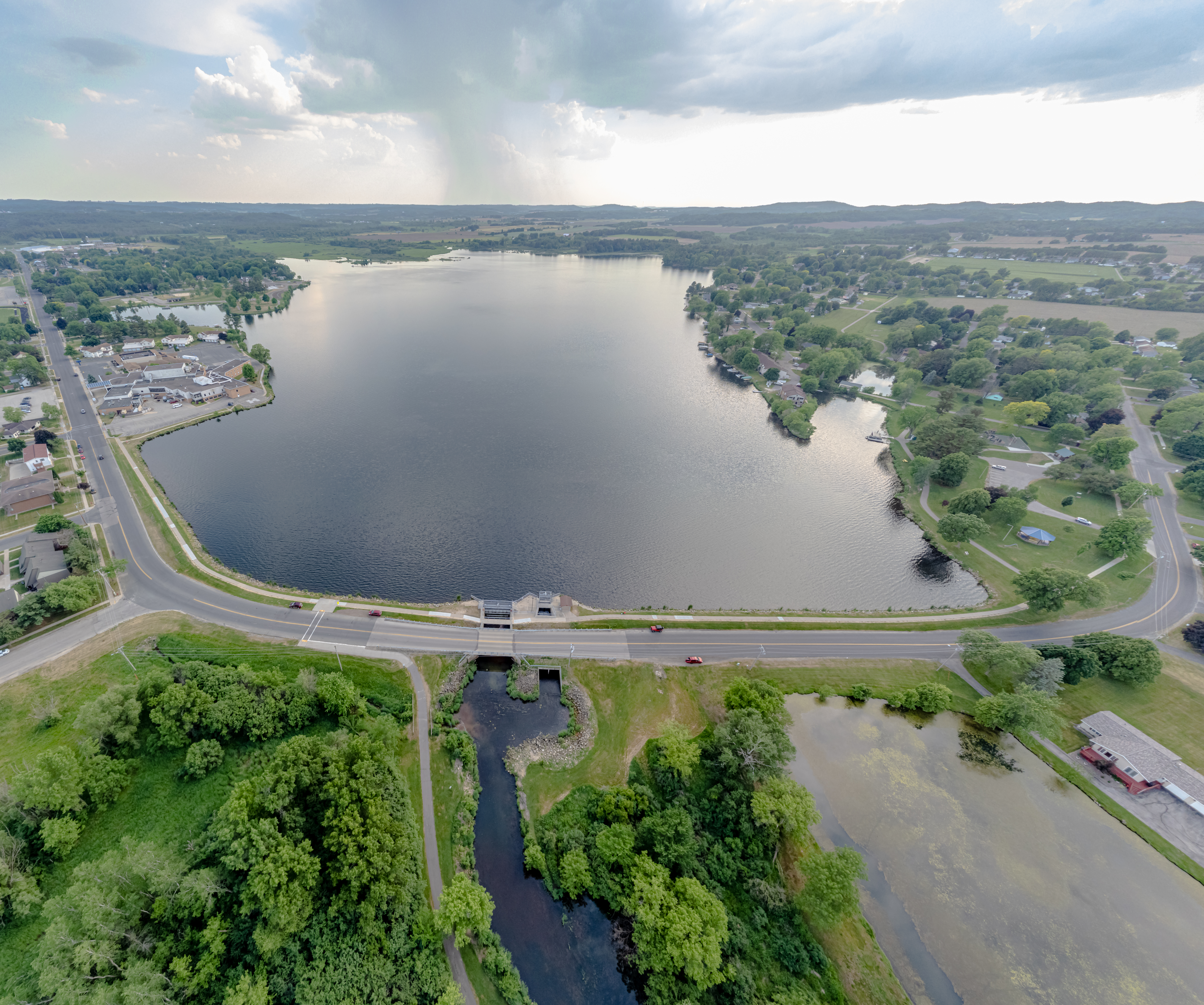
Lake Tomah

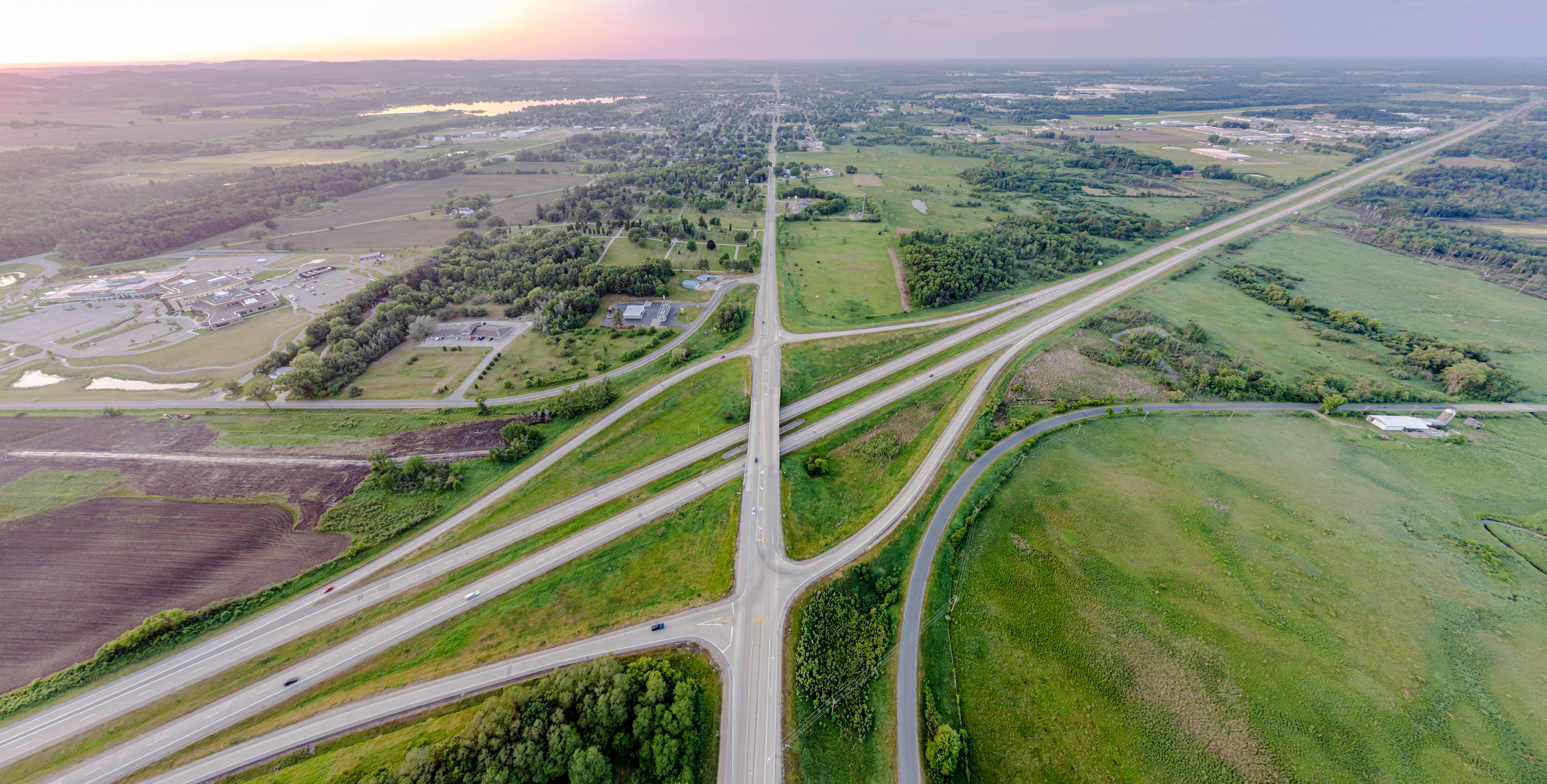
Tomah looking north from I-90

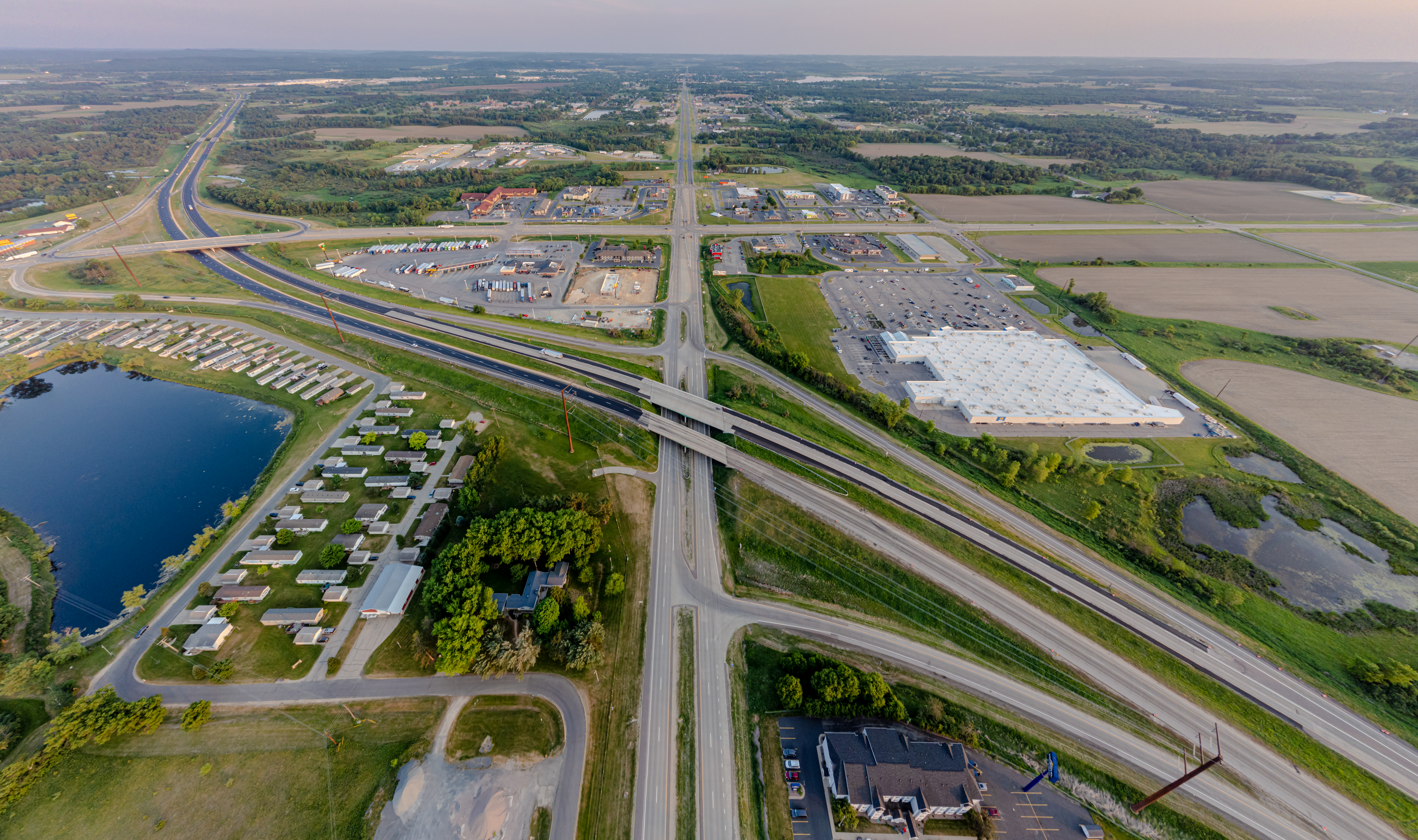
Tomah looking south from I-94

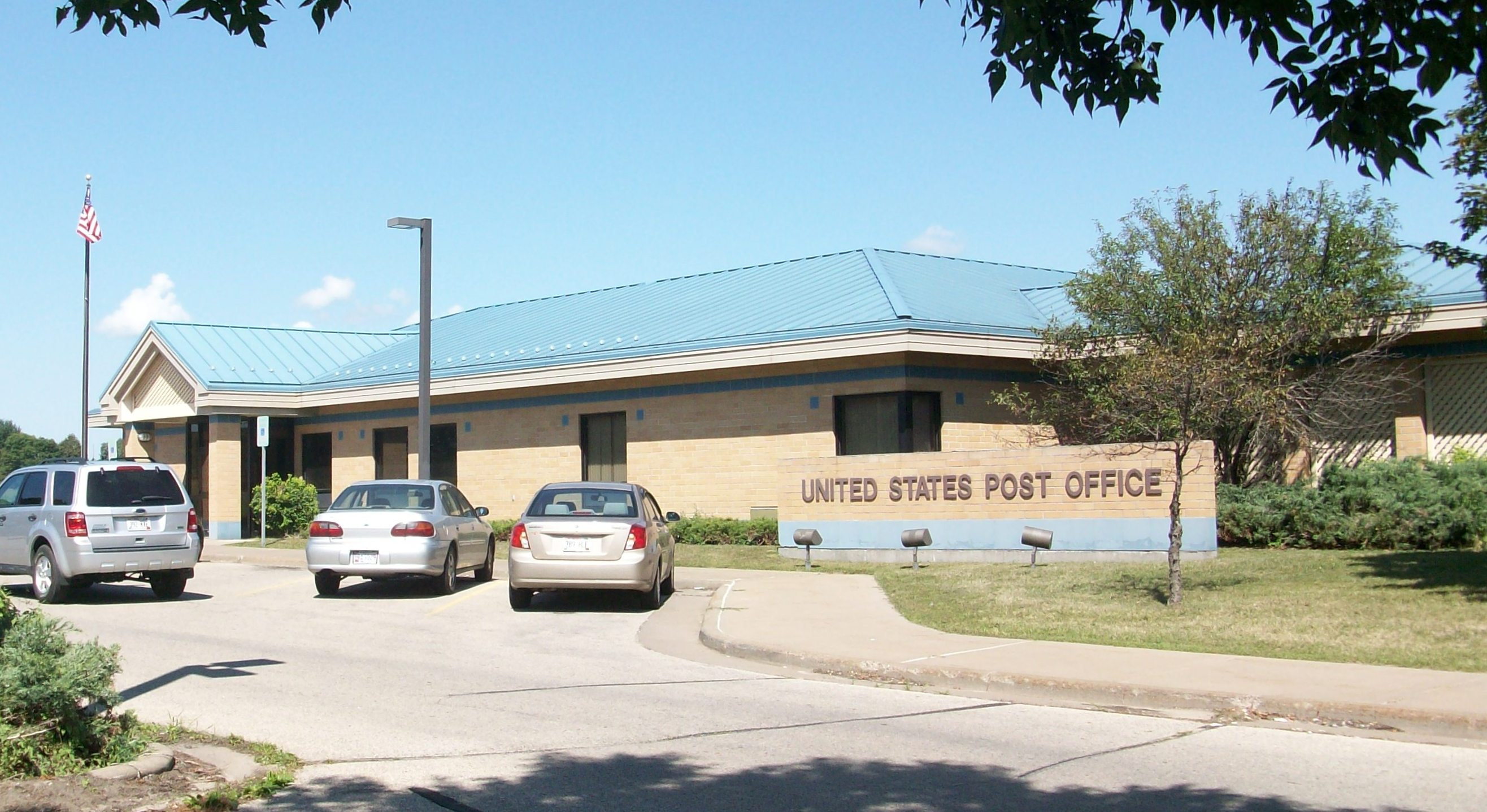
Post office

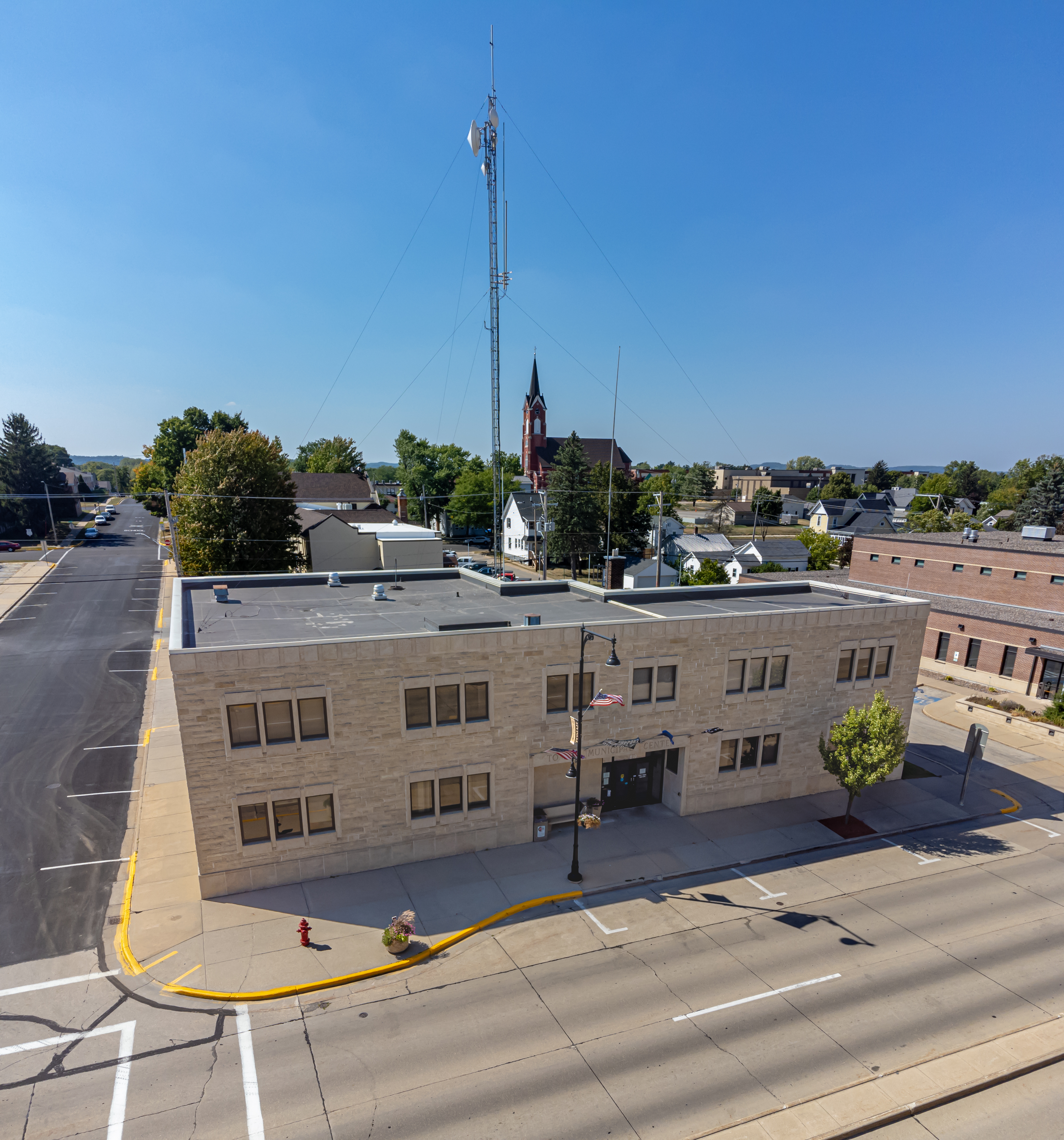
Tomah Municipal Center

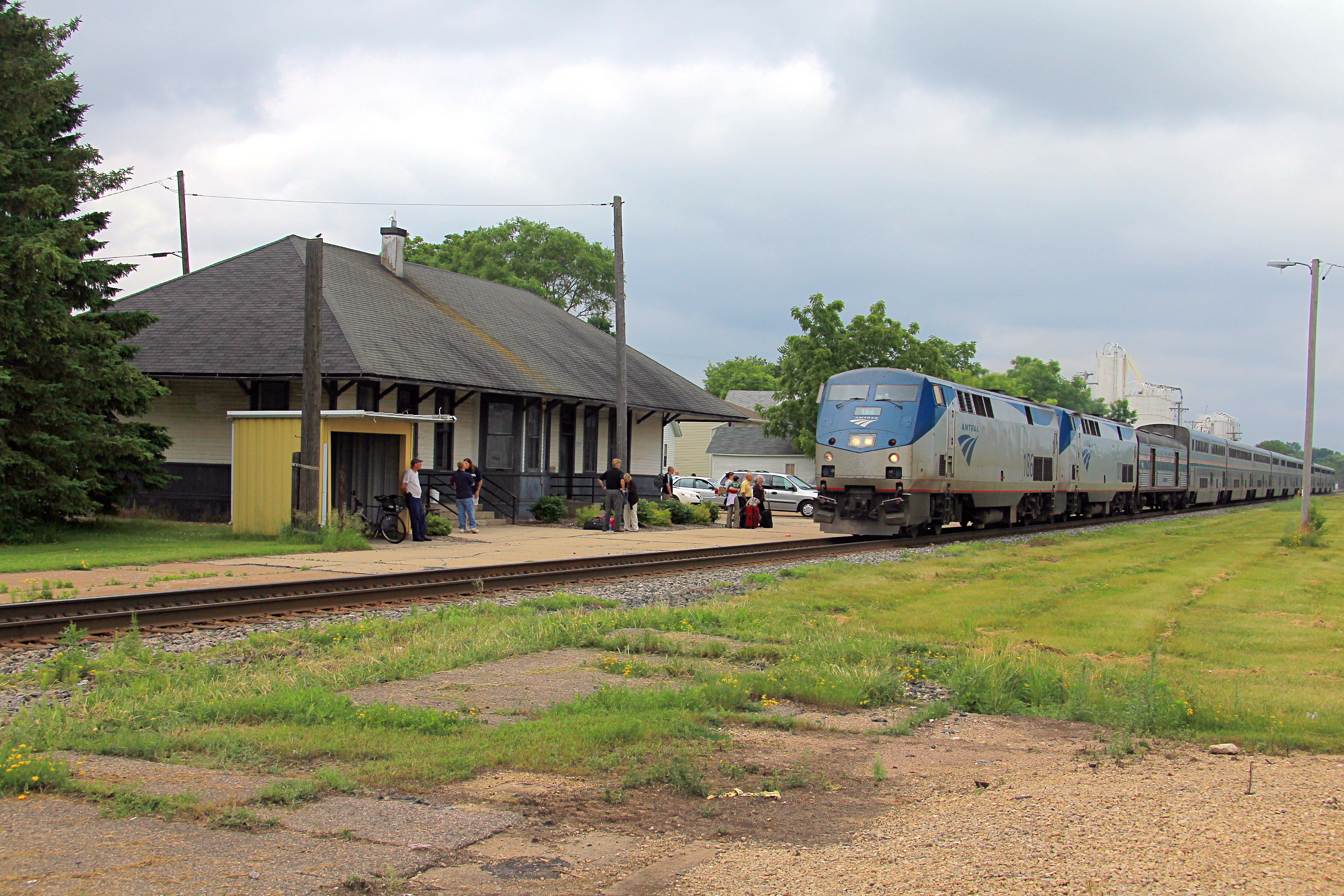
The Empire Builder at Tomah station

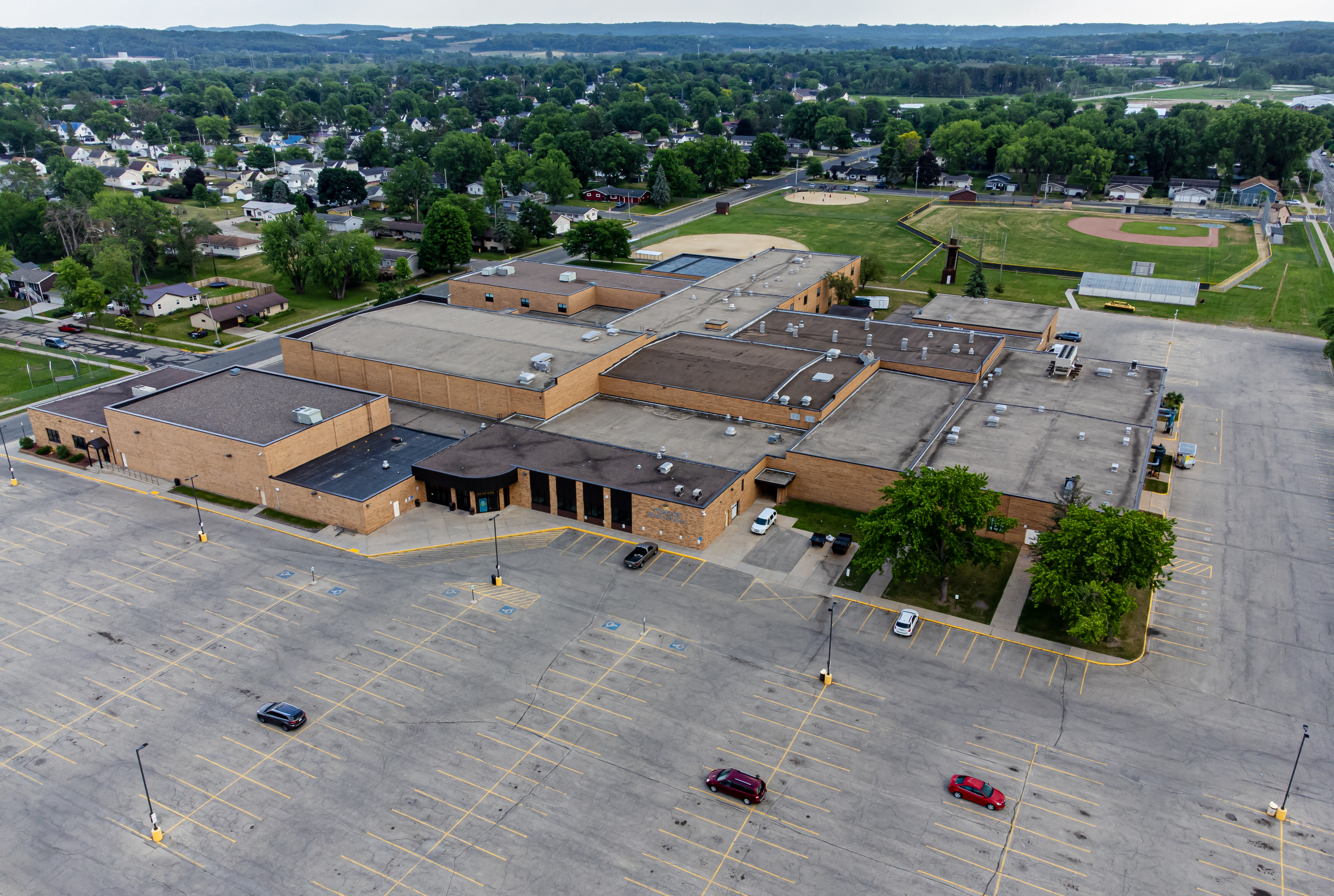
Tomah High School

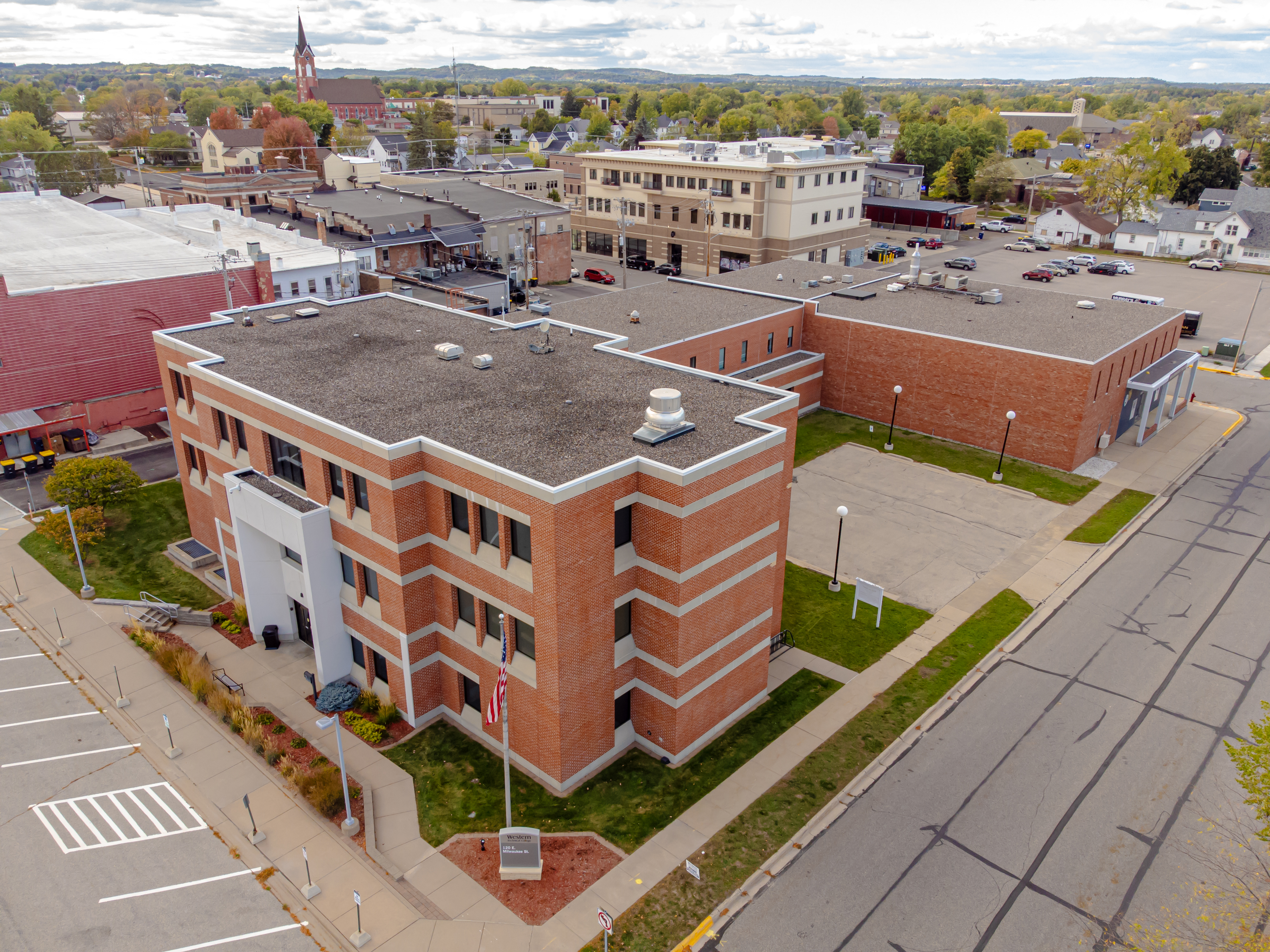
Western Technical College - Tomah

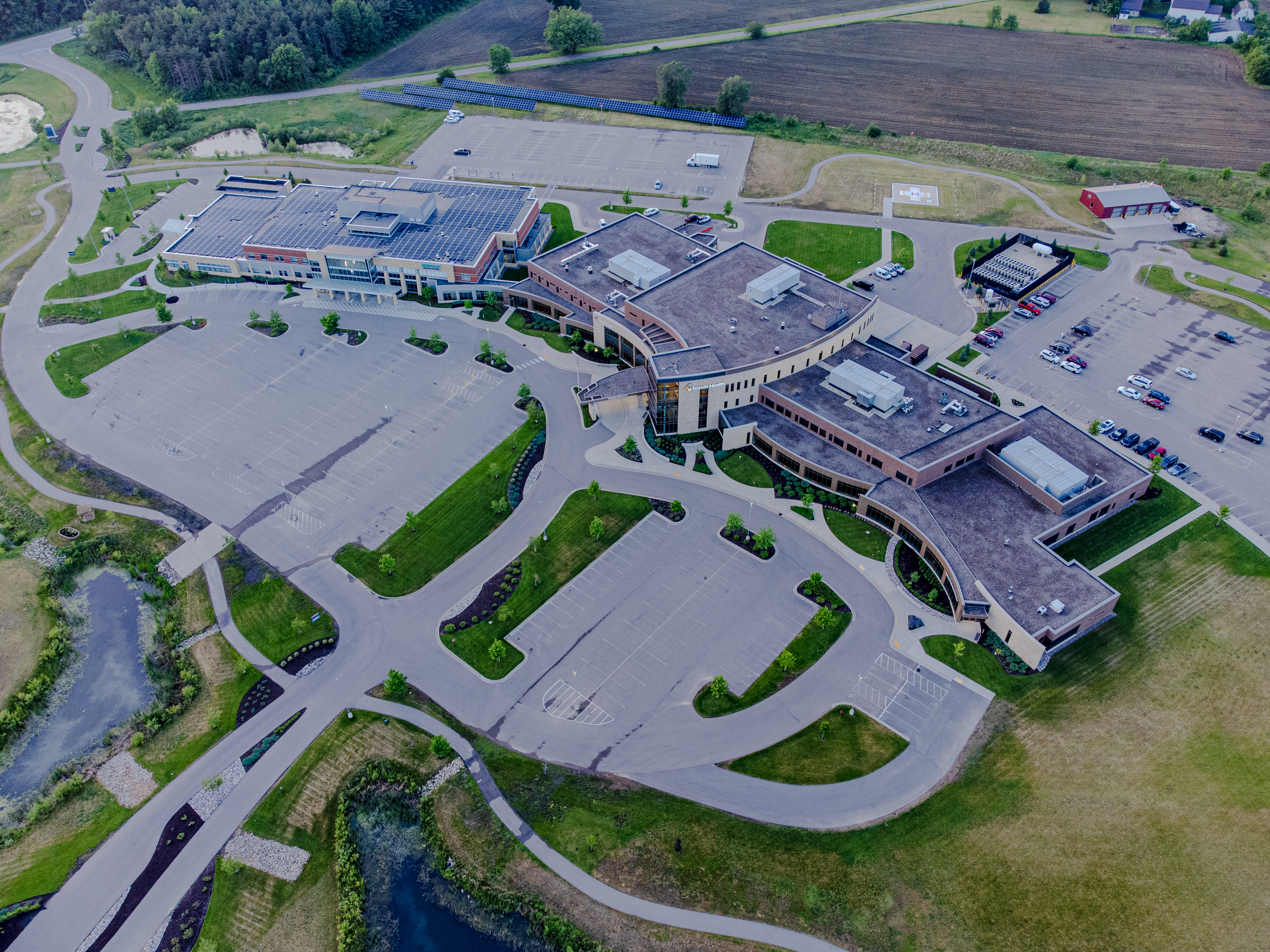
Gundersen Health System and Tomah Health
