= James Tormey =

American politician

James Tormey (born March 13, 1839, in County Meath, Ireland), was a member of the Wisconsin State Assembly.

After residing in Big Bend, Waukesha County, Wisconsin, he settled in Tomah, Wisconsin in 1866.

== Career ==
Tormey was elected to the Assembly in 1890. Additionally, he was a member of the Tomah common council and of the county board of Monroe County, Wisconsin. He was a Democrat.
