= Wellington, Wisconsin =

- Town
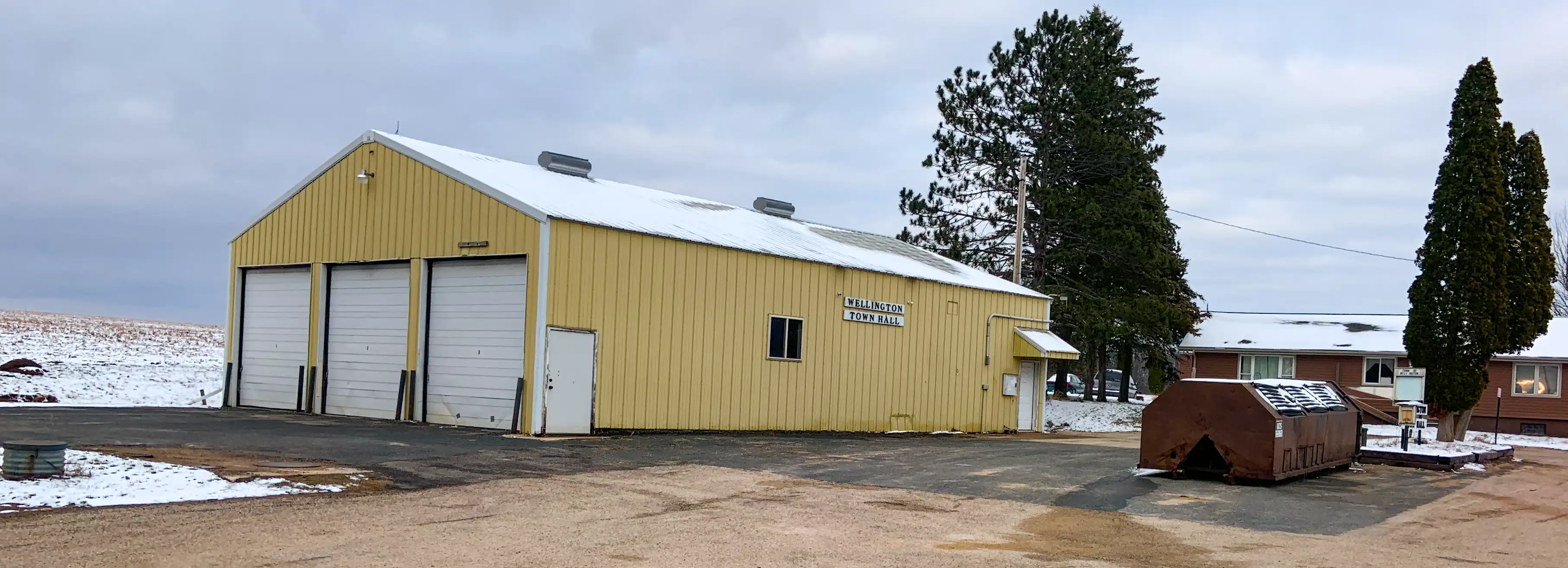
- Town hall

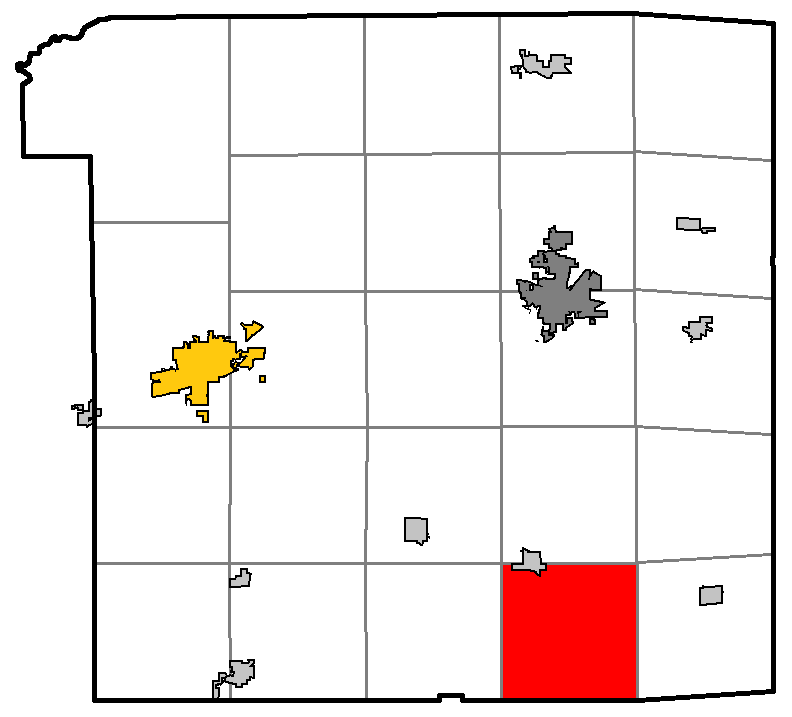
- Location of Wellington, Monroe County

- Location of Monroe County, Wisconsin
- Coordinates: 43°45′59″N 90°29′20″W
- Country: United States
- State: Wisconsin
- County: Monroe

Area
  - Total: 35.4 sq mi (91.7 km^{2})
  - Land: 35.4 sq mi (91.7 km^{2})
  - Water: 0 sq mi (0.0 km^{2})
- Elevation: 1,371 ft (418 m)

Population (2020)
  - Total: 666
  - Density: 18.8/sq mi (7.26/km^{2})
- Time zone: UTC-6 (Central (CST))
  - Summer (DST): UTC-5 (CDT)
- Area code: 608
- FIPS code: 55-85125
- GNIS feature ID: 1584394
- Website: https://townshipofwellington.com/

Wellington is a town in Monroe County, Wisconsin, United States. The population was 666 at the 2020 census.

== Geography ==
According to the United States Census Bureau, the town has a total area of 35.4 square miles (91.7 km^{2}), all land.

== Demographics ==
At the 2000 census there were 544 people, 185 households, and 152 families in the town. The population density was 15.4 people per square mile (5.9/km^{2}). There were 221 housing units at an average density of 6.2 per square mile (2.4/km^{2}). The racial makeup of the town was 98.71% White, 0.18% Native American, 0.55% from other races, and 0.55% from two or more races. Hispanic or Latino of any race were 1.65%.

Of the 185 households 40.0% had children under the age of 18 living with them, 73.5% were married couples living together, 5.4% had a female householder with no husband present, and 17.3% were non-families. 15.1% of households were one person and 5.4% were one person aged 65 or older. The average household size was 2.94 and the average family size was 3.29.

The age distribution was 32.7% under the age of 18, 6.4% from 18 to 24, 26.7% from 25 to 44, 23.0% from 45 to 64, and 11.2% 65 or older. The median age was 34 years. For every 100 females, there were 100.7 males. For every 100 females age 18 and over, there were 117.9 males.

The median household income was $36,146 and the median family income was $37,500. Males had a median income of $26,250 versus $17,500 for females. The per capita income for the town was $14,962. About 11.5% of families and 16.5% of the population were below the poverty line, including 23.7% of those under age 18 and 5.5% of those age 65 or over.
