= La Grange, Monroe County, Wisconsin =

La Grange, Wisconsin
- Town
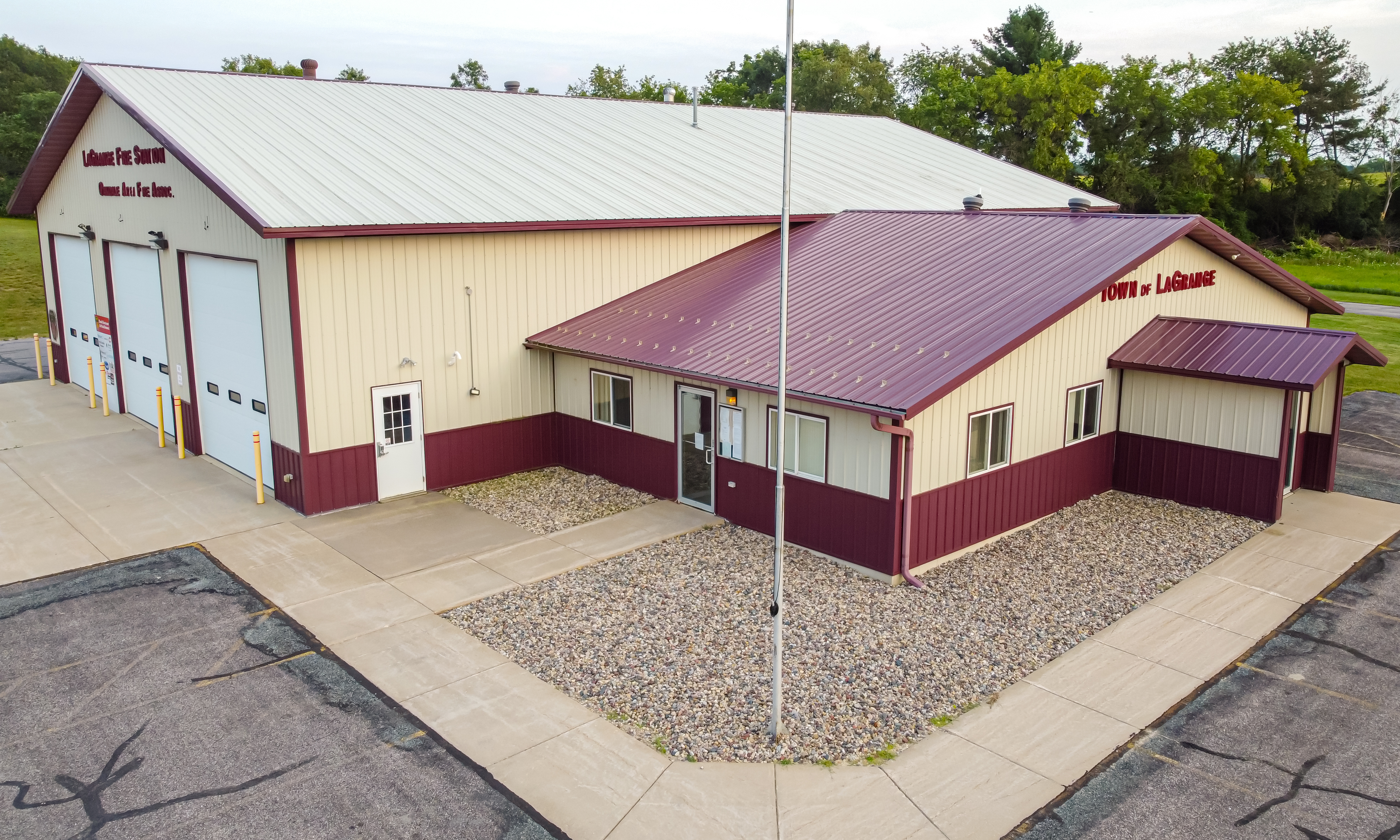
- Town hall and fire station

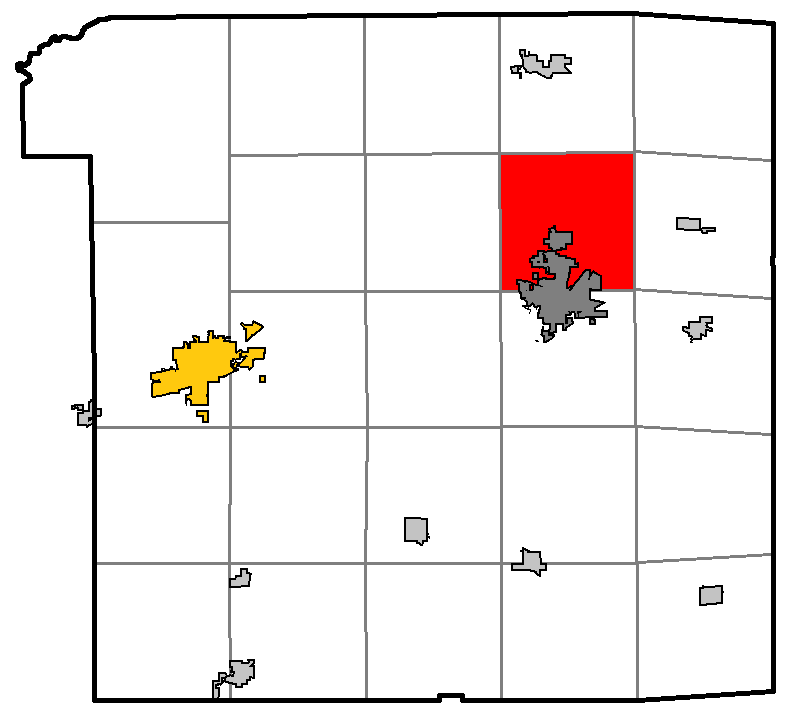
- Location of La Grange, Monroe County, Wisconsin

- Location of Monroe County, Wisconsin
- Coordinates: 44°0′54″N 90°29′35″W
- Country: United States
- State: Wisconsin
- County: Monroe

Area
  - Total: 31.5 sq mi (81.5 km^{2})
  - Land: 29.9 sq mi (77.4 km^{2})
  - Water: 1.6 sq mi (4.1 km^{2})
- Elevation: 945 ft (288 m)

Population (2020)
  - Total: 1,948
  - Density: 65.2/sq mi (25.2/km^{2})
- Time zone: UTC-6 (Central (CST))
  - Summer (DST): UTC-5 (CDT)
- Area code: 608
- FIPS code: 55-41000
- GNIS feature ID: 1583506
- Website: https://www.townoflagrangemcwi.gov/

La Grange is a town in Monroe County, Wisconsin, United States. The population was 1,948 at the 2020 census.

== Geography ==
According to the United States Census Bureau, the town has a total area of 31.5 square miles (81.5 km^{2}), of which 29.9 square miles (77.4 km^{2}) is land and 1.6 square miles (4.1 km^{2}) (5.05%) is water.

== Demographics ==
As of the census of 2000, there were 1,761 people, 641 households, and 532 families residing in the town. The population density was 58.9 people per square mile (22.8/km^{2}). There were 666 housing units at an average density of 22.3 per square mile (8.6/km^{2}). The racial makeup of the town was 96.88% White, 0.06% African American, 2.33% Native American, 0.11% Asian, 0.28% from other races, and 0.34% from two or more races. Hispanic or Latino of any race were 0.11% of the population.

There were 641 households, out of which 38.8% had children under the age of 18 living with them, 72.4% were married couples living together, 6.4% had a female householder with no husband present, and 17.0% were non-families. 13.1% of all households were made up of individuals, and 5.8% had someone living alone who was 65 years of age or older. The average household size was 2.75 and the average family size was 2.99.

In the town, the population was spread out, with 27.4% under the age of 18, 6.0% from 18 to 24, 28.3% from 25 to 44, 27.4% from 45 to 64, and 10.9% who were 65 years of age or older. The median age was 39 years. For every 100 females, there were 104.8 males. For every 100 females age 18 and over, there were 100.8 males.

The median income for a household in the town was $49,760, and the median income for a family was $51,786. Males had a median income of $34,471 versus $23,500 for females. The per capita income for the town was $19,229. About 1.6% of families and 2.9% of the population were below the poverty line, including 3.9% of those under age 18 and 3.0% of those age 65 or over.
