= Tomah (town), Wisconsin =

Tomah, Wisconsin
- Town
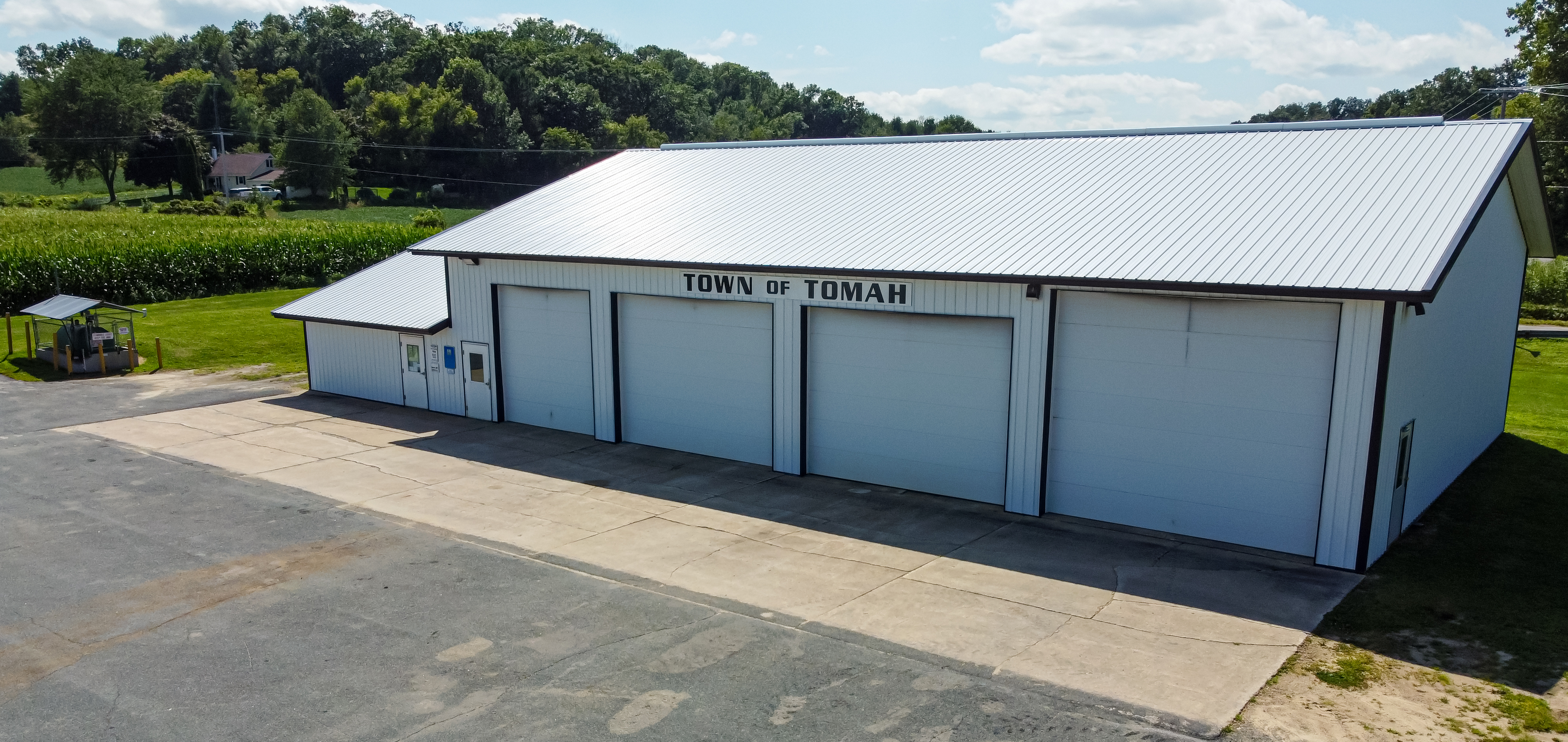
- Town hall

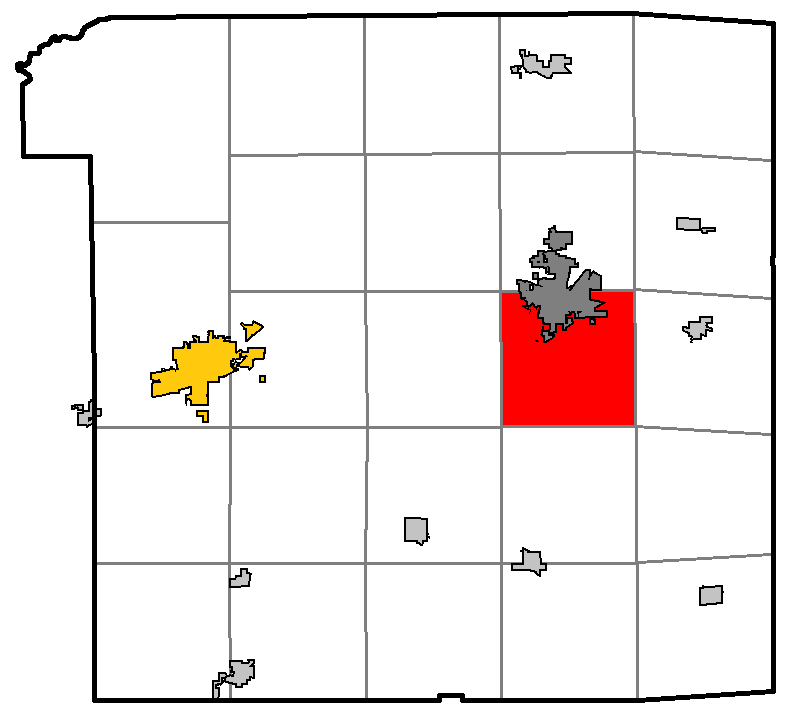
- Location of Tomah (town), Monroe County

- Location of Monroe County, Wisconsin
- Coordinates: 43°57′0″N 90°29′17″W
- Country: United States
- State: Wisconsin
- County: Monroe

Area
  - Total: 31.5 sq mi (81.6 km^{2})
  - Land: 31.5 sq mi (81.5 km^{2})
  - Water: 0 sq mi (0.0 km^{2})
- Elevation: 1,020 ft (310 m)

Population (2020)
  - Total: 1,488
  - Density: 47.3/sq mi (18.3/km^{2})
- Time zone: UTC-6 (Central (CST))
  - Summer (DST): UTC-5 (CDT)
- Area code: 608
- FIPS code: 55-80100
- GNIS feature ID: 1584283
- Website: https://townoftomah.wi.gov/

Tomah is a town in Monroe County, Wisconsin, United States. The population was 1,488 at the 2020 census. It lies adjacent to the city of Tomah.

== Geography ==
According to the United States Census Bureau, the town has a total area of 31.5 square miles (81.6 km^{2}), all land.

== Demographics ==
As of the census of 2000, there were 1,194 people, 428 households, and 338 families residing in the town. The population density was 37.9 people per square mile (14.6/km^{2}). There were 445 housing units at an average density of 14.1 per square mile (5.5/km^{2}). The racial makeup of the town was 97.49% White, 0.92% Black or African American, 0.25% Native American, 0.67% Asian, and 0.67% from two or more races. 0.75% of the population were Hispanic or Latino of any race.

There were 428 households, out of which 36.4% had children under the age of 18 living with them, 70.6% were married couples living together, 5.8% had a female householder with no husband present, and 21.0% were non-families. 17.8% of all households were made up of individuals, and 7.7% had someone living alone who was 65 years of age or older. The average household size was 2.79 and the average family size was 3.17.

In the town, the population was spread out, with 29.0% under the age of 18, 6.4% from 18 to 24, 28.6% from 25 to 44, 23.5% from 45 to 64, and 12.6% who were 65 years of age or older. The median age was 37 years. For every 100 females, there were 102.0 males. For every 100 females age 18 and over, there were 99.5 males.

The median income for a household in the town was $46,923, and the median income for a family was $52,639. Males had a median income of $32,361 versus $23,417 for females. The per capita income for the town was $18,065. About 4.6% of families and 8.3% of the population were below the poverty line, including 14.4% of those under age 18 and 5.5% of those age 65 or over.

== See also ==
- List of towns in Wisconsin
