= Wonewoc =

Wonewoc may refer to:

- Wonewoc, Wisconsin, a village in Juneau County, Wisconsin, United States
- Wonewoc (town), Wisconsin, a town in Juneau County, Wisconsin, United States
- Wonewoc Spiritualist Camp in Juneau County, Wisconsin, United States
