= William H. H. Cash =

American politician and businessman (1849-1924)

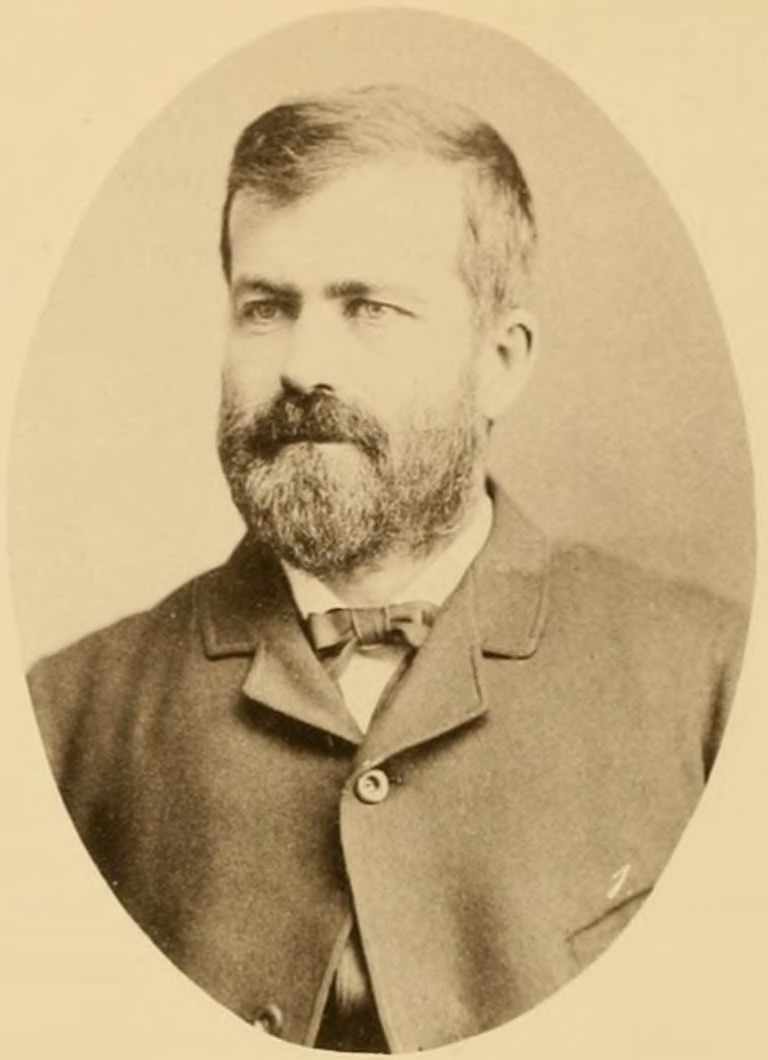
- Portrait from Soldiers and Citizens' Album of Biographical Record (1890)

Member of the Wisconsin State Assembly from the Juneau 2nd district
- In office January 1, 1877 – January 7, 1878
- Preceded by: Charles Erwin Booth (whole county)
- Succeeded by: E. D. Rogers

Personal details
- Born: July 19, 1843 Flushing, Ohio, U.S.
- Died: August 13, 1924 (aged 81) New Lisbon, Wisconsin, U.S.
- Resting place: New Lisbon City Cemetery, New Lisbon, Wisconsin
- Party: Republican
- Spouses: Georgia Anna Surdam (m. 1865, divorced); Alma Letitia Harris (m. 1899; died 1909); Angeline Dodge (m. 1910–1924)
- Children: with Georgia Surdam; Charles Frederick Cash^{(b. 1866; died 1937)}; Adelbert Burns Cash^{(b. 1869; died 1943)}; Jessie Mabel (Stokes)^{(b. 1872; died 1949)}; John Avery Cash^{(b. 1875; died 1949)}; William "Willis" Newell Cash^{(b. 1880; died 1967)}; Wade Leslie Cash^{(b. 1890; died 1964)}; with Alma Harris; Grant Cash^{(b. 1900; died 1971)}; Nettie Delia (Kukowski)^{(b. 1902; died 1967)}; Daniel Cash^{(b. 1909; died 1909)}

Military service
- Allegiance: United States
- Branch/service: United States Volunteers; Union Army
- Years of service: 1864–1865
- Rank: Private, USV
- Unit: 10th Bty. Wis. Light Artillery
- Battles/wars: American Civil War

William Henry Harrison Cash (July 19, 1843 – August 13, 1924) was an American businessman and Republican politician. He was a member of the Wisconsin State Assembly, representing northern Juneau County during the 1877 session.

== Early life and war service ==
Born in Flushing, Belmont County, Ohio, Cash moved with his parents to New Lisbon, Wisconsin, in 1861. At age 20, he enlisted for service in the Union Army and was enrolled in the 10th Independent Battery Wisconsin Light Artillery. He served with his battery in the western theater of the war, and saw significant combat in Sherman's campaigns through Atlanta, Savannah, and the Carolinas. He marched in the Grand Review of the Armies and mustered out with his regiment in June 1865.

== Career ==
After returning to Wisconsin, he was engaged as a livestock and produce dealer. Cash was also involved with the coal, insurance, banking, and railroad businesses. He helped found (co-founded) the village of Cashton, Wisconsin. Cash was the postmaster for New Lisbon and served on the Juneau County, Wisconsin, board of supervisors. In 1877, Cash served in the Wisconsin State Assembly and was a Republican. Cash died of heart failure in New Lisbon, Wisconsin.

== Electoral history ==
=== Wisconsin Assembly (1876) ===
Wisconsin Assembly, Juneau 2nd District Election, 1876
Party	Candidate	Votes	%	±%
General Election, November 7, 1876
Republican	William H. H. Cash	878	60.51%	
Democratic	G. P. Kenyon	573	39.49%	
Plurality		305	21.02%	
Total votes		1,451	100.0%	
Republican win (new seat)				

Wisconsin State Assembly
Preceded by Charles Erwin Booth (whole county)	Member of the Wisconsin State Assembly from the Juneau 2nd district January 1, 1877 – January 7, 1878	Succeeded by E. D. Rogers
