= Dwight York (disambiguation) =

Dwight York is an American criminal.

Dwight York may also refer to:

- Dwight York (comedian), stand-up comedian
- Dwight A. York, Wisconsin politician

== See also ==
- Dwight Yorke, Trinidad and Tobago footballer
- Dwight Yorke Stadium, Tobago, a football stadium
