= Job Grant =

American politician and farmer

Job N. Grant (October 4, 1832 – 1910) was an American farmer from the Town of Wonewoc, Wisconsin, near Union Center, who held a number of local public offices, and spent a single one-year term as a Reform Party member of the Wisconsin State Assembly from Juneau County.

== Background ==
Grant was born in 1832 in England. At the age of eight, he emigrated with his mother to the United States. He lived with her in Monroe County, New York. where he received a common school education and worked on farms. He left for Wisconsin in 1850, sojourning for one summer in Lake Mills in Jefferson County before moving on to what is now Juneau County, and in 1851 settled in the Town of Wonewoc. In the fall of 1852, he cut a road from his place to the Village of Wonewoc, and also helped open the road to Mauston, over which he was the first to drive a team. In March 1853, he left for California, where he stayed for six years and three months, working on farms and as a teamster.

== Return to Wisconsin ==
He returned to Wisconsin in 1859, reporting that he had netted only one dollar from all his time in California. That year he married Julia N. Huff, a native of Philadelphia, Pennsylvania born in 1840; by 1881 they would have five children. He purchased 160 acres in Section 8 of the township, later adding more, on which he built a farm. On November 17, 1863, he was drafted for the United States Army but paid $300 for a substitute, as the law of the time permitted.

== Politics ==
Grant was a Democrat by affiliation. From 1860 he held various office in his town, including chairman, treasurer, assessor, and justice of the peace; and in 1872 was an unsuccessful candidate for county treasurer. In 1874 he was elected to the Juneau County Assembly seat as a member of the Liberal Reform Party (a short-lived coalition of Democrats, reform and Liberal Republicans, and Grangers formed in 1873 which elected one Governor of Wisconsin and a number of state legislators). He won 1,403 votes, to 1,215 for Republican R. Moulton (Republican incumbent John Tabor Kingston was not a candidate for re-election). He was assigned to the standing committee on roads and bridges. He sought re-election in 1875, but (with the Reform movement already on the wane) was unseated by Republican Charles Erwin Booth, with 741 votes to 1,531 for Booth.

== Later life ==
On May 8, 1878, he was a member of the Juneau County Board of Supervisors from Wonewoc, and was elected as chairman of the board at a special meeting of that body held to consider proposed improvements to the County Jail.

He died in 1910, and is buried in the Pine Eden Cemetery in Wonewoc, along with Julia Ann Grant (1840-1913), whose stone describes her as "Wife of Job N. Grant".
