= William H. Barnes (Wisconsin politician) =

American politician

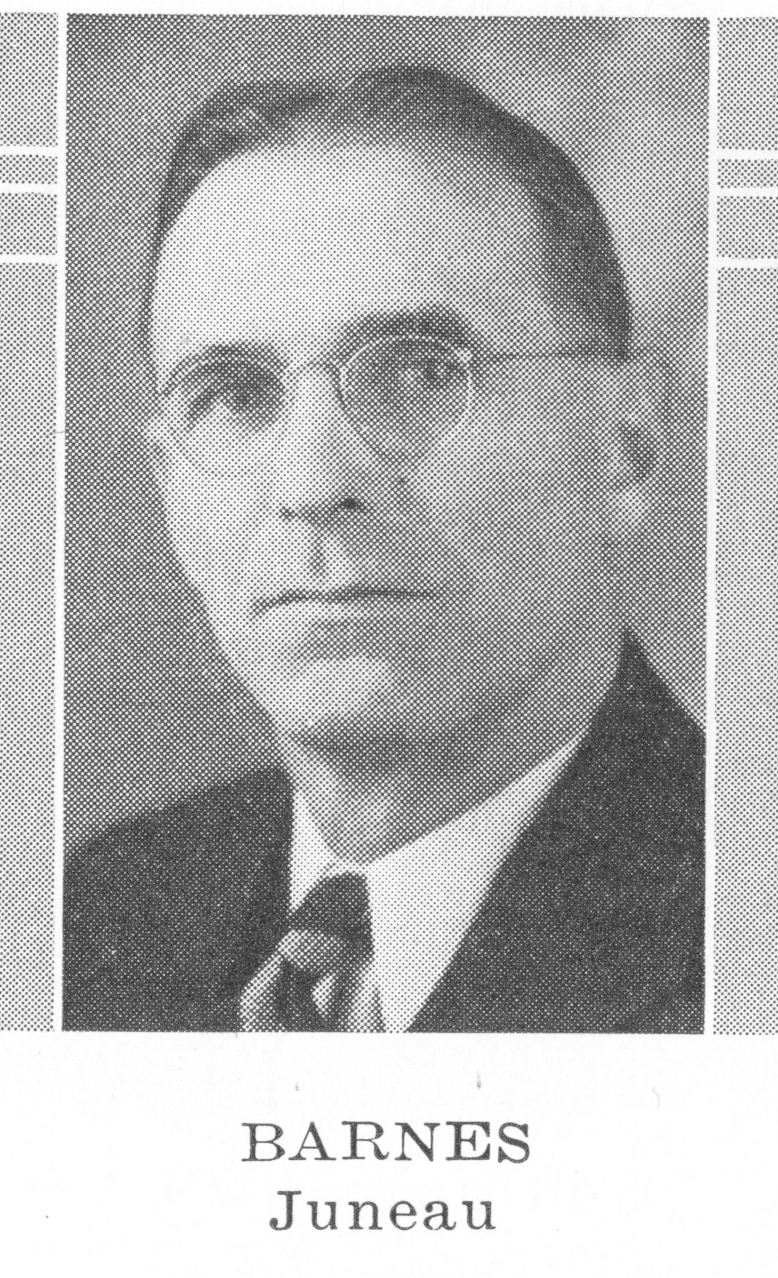
William H. Barnes

William Henry Barnes (April 5, 1885 - September 25, 1973) was a member of the Wisconsin State Assembly.

== Biography ==
Barnes was born in Lisbon, Juneau County, Wisconsin, on April 5, 1885. On September 25, 1973, Barnes died in New Lisbon, Wisconsin. He is buried there.

== Career ==
Barnes was a member of the Assembly from 1935 to 1940. He was a member of the Wisconsin Progressive Party.
