= Lisbon, Wisconsin =

Lisbon is the name of a Village in Waukesha county and a Town in Juneau County Wisconsin.

- Town of Lisbon, Juneau County, Wisconsin
- Village of Lisbon, Waukesha County, Wisconsin
