= Mauston–New Lisbon Union Airport =

- IATA: none; ICAO: none; FAA LID: 82C

Summary
- Airport type: Public
- Owner: Cities of Mauston and New Lisbon
- Operator: City of New Lisbon
- Serves: New Lisbon and Mauston, Wisconsin
- Time zone: CST (UTC−06:00)
  - Summer (DST): CDT (UTC−05:00)
- Elevation AMSL: 908 ft / 277 m
- Coordinates: 43°50′20″N 090°8′16″W

Map
- Location of airport in Wisconsin 82C (the United States)

Runways
Direction	Length		Surface
Direction	ft	m	Surface
14/32	3,688	1,124	Asphalt

Statistics
- Aircraft operations (2024): 10,390
- Based aircraft (2024): 30
- Source: Federal Aviation Administration

Mauston–New Lisbon Union Airport (FAA LID: 82C) is a joint city owned public use airport located 3 miles (5 km) southeast of the central business district of New Lisbon, Wisconsin, a city in Juneau County, Wisconsin, United States. It is also owned by the city of Mauston, Wisconsin, a city of the same county. It is included in the Federal Aviation Administration (FAA) National Plan of Integrated Airport Systems for 2025–2029, in which it is categorized as a local general aviation facility.

Although most airports in the United States use the same three-letter location identifier for the FAA and International Air Transport Association (IATA), this airport is assigned 82C by the FAA but has no designation from the IATA.

== Facilities and aircraft ==
Mauston–New Lisbon Union Airport covers an area of 248 acres (100 ha) at an elevation of 908 feet (277 m) above mean sea level. It has one runway: 14/32 is 3,688 by 75 feet (1,124 x 23 m) with an asphalt surface, it has approved GPS approaches.

For the 12-month period ending May 30, 2024, the airport had 10,390 aircraft operations, an average of 28 per day: 97% general aviation, 3% air taxi and less than 1% military. In July 2024, there were 30 aircraft based at this airport: all 30 single-engine.

== See also ==
- List of airports in Wisconsin
