= Robert Schulz (musician) =

- Born: July 1, 1938 (age 86); Wonewoc, Wisconsin, U.S.
- Genres: Jazz
- Instruments: Cornet

Robert "Bob" Schulz (born July 1, 1938) is an American jazz and Dixieland jazz cornetist.

== Early life and education ==
Schulz was born in Wonewoc, Wisconsin and raised between Wisconsin Dells and La Crosse. He attended the University of Wisconsin–La Crosse.

== Career ==
Schulz was a band director for 17 years. During this period, he played and cut two albums with the Riverboat Ramblers which worked out of Madison, Wisconsin. In 1979, he joined the Turk Murphy Jazz Band in San Francisco. He stayed with the group for eight years, until Murphy's death. He went on to lead the Bob Schulz's Frisco Jazz Band, and has put out 6 studio albums (the later four being under the band name of Bob Schultz and his Frisco Jazz Band), one live album, and one compilation (also as Bob Schulz and his Frisco Jazz Band). Additionally, he has released recordings as Bob Schulz & His Chicago Rhythm Kings, Bob Hirsch & Bob Schulz and The Midcoast Reunion Jazz Band.
