= John M. Barlow =

American businessman and politician

John Moses Barlow (May 17, 1833 – April 29, 1903) was an American businessman and politician.

Barlow was born in Lee, Massachusetts and went to the Lee public schools. In 1851, Barlow moved to East Troy, Wisconsin and was involved in the mercantile business. He also lived in Medina, New York and Mukwonago, Wisconsin. In 1870, Barlow settled in New Lisbon, Wisconsin. He was involved in the mercantile business in New Lisbon. Barlow served on the New Lisbon Village Board and as village president. He served on the Juneau County Board of Supervisors and was chairman of the county board. Barlow served in the Wisconsin Assembly from 1899 to 1903 and was a Republican. Barlow died from cancer of the stomach in New Lisbon, Wisconsin.
