= 10th Independent Battery Wisconsin Light Artillery =

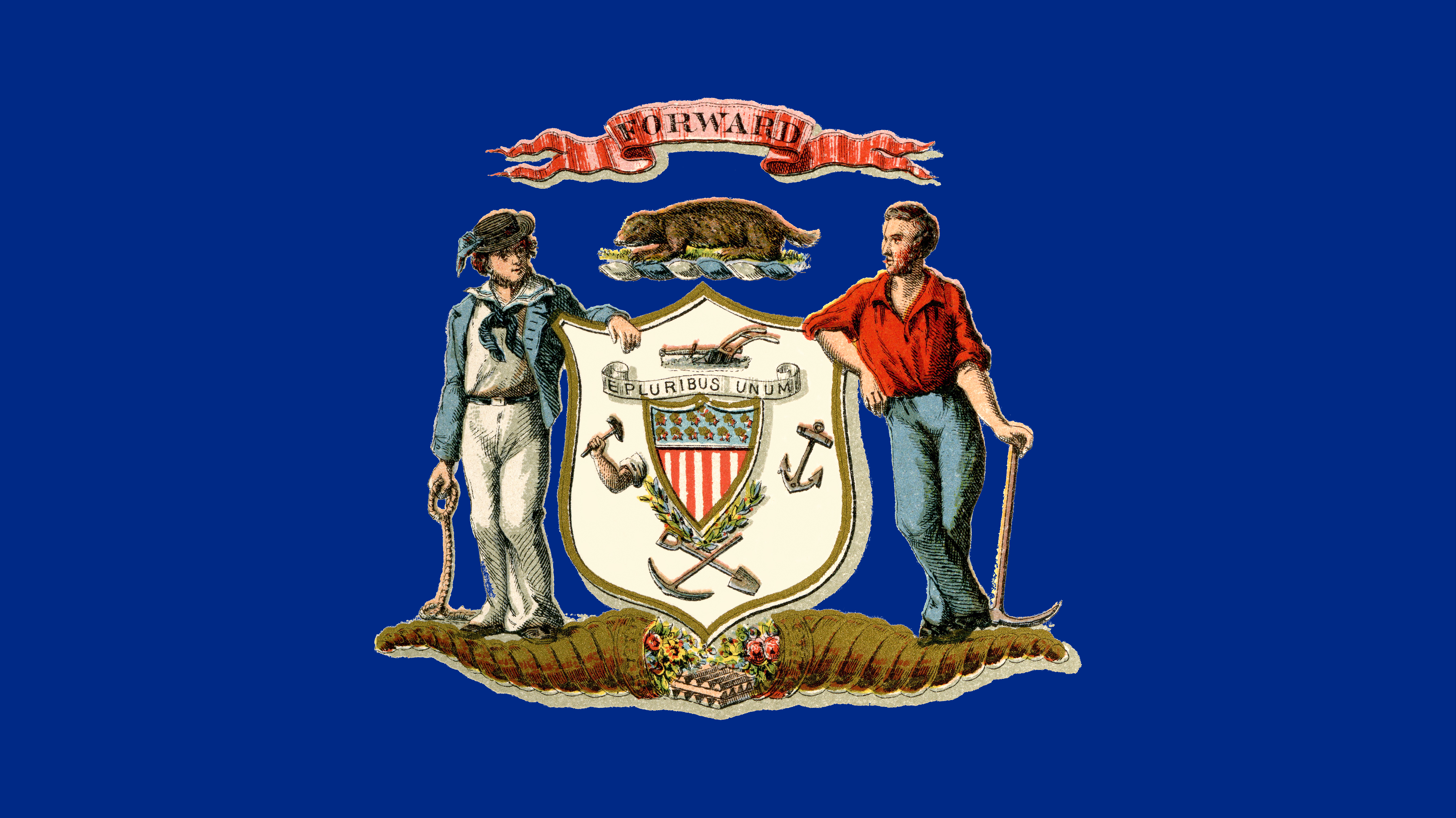
- Active: February 10, 1862 – September 30, 1865
- Country: United States
- Allegiance: Union
- Branch: Artillery
- Size: Artillery Battery
- Engagements: American Civil War: Siege of Corinth; Battle of Stones River; Battle of Resaca; Battle of Jonesboro; Battle of Aiken; Battle of Monroe's Crossroads; Battle of Bentonville

The 10th Independent Battery Wisconsin Light Artillery, was an artillery battery that served in the Union Army during the American Civil War.

== Service ==
The 10th Independent Battery was mustered into service at New Lisbon, Wisconsin, on February 10, 1862.

The men who did not reenlist were mustered out on April 26, 1865, in Madison, Wisconsin, while the remainder were transferred to the 12th Independent Battery Wisconsin Light Artillery on April 20, 1865.

== Total strength and casualties ==
The 10th Independent Battery initially recruited 47 officers and men. An additional 121 men were recruited as replacements, for a total of 168 men.

The battery suffered 3 enlisted men killed in action or died or wounds and 25 enlisted men who died of disease, for a total of 28 fatalities.

== Commanders ==
- Captain Yates V. Beebe

== See also ==
- List of Wisconsin Civil War units
- Wisconsin in the American Civil War
