= Flushing, Ohio =

- Village
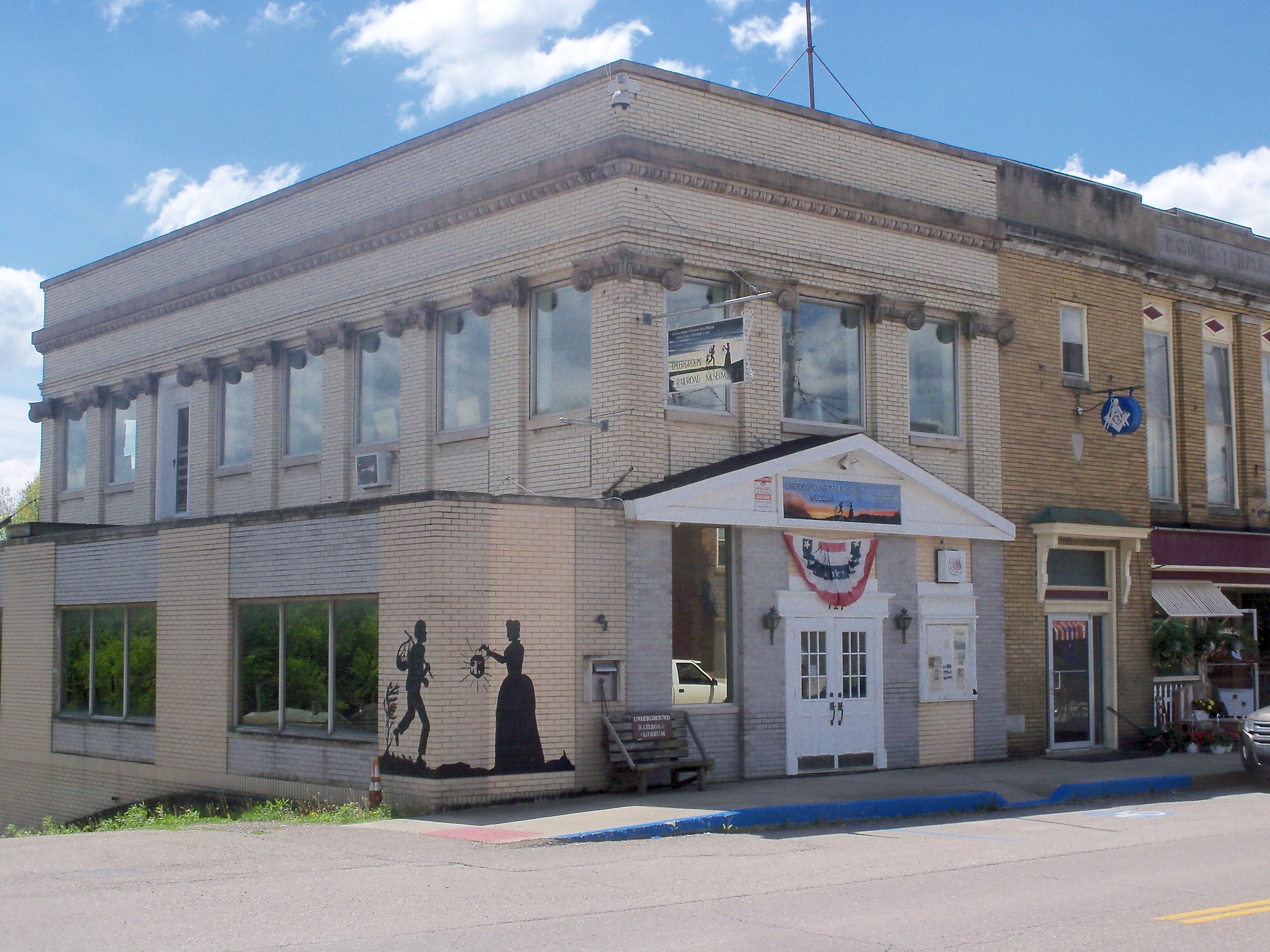
- The Underground Railroad Museum on High Street

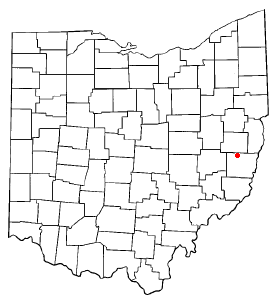
- Location of Flushing, Ohio

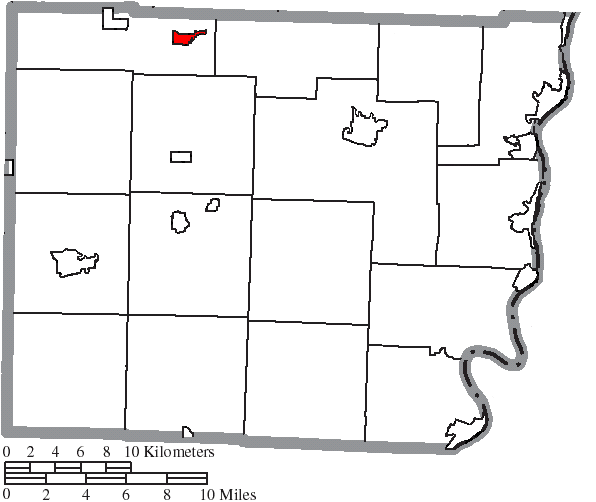
- Location of Flushing in Belmont County
- Coordinates: 40°08′53″N 81°03′52″W
- Country: United States
- State: Ohio
- County: Belmont
- Township: Flushing
- Founded: 1813
- Incorporated: 1849

Area
  - Total: 0.61 sq mi (1.59 km^{2})
  - Land: 0.61 sq mi (1.59 km^{2})
  - Water: 0 sq mi (0.00 km^{2})
- Elevation: 1,273 ft (388 m)

Population (2020)
  - Total: 830
  - Estimate (2023): 807
  - Density: 1,352.8/sq mi (522.31/km^{2})
- Time zone: UTC-5 (Eastern (EST))
  - Summer (DST): UTC-4 (EDT)
- ZIP code: 43977
- Area code: 740
- FIPS code: 39-27552
- GNIS feature ID: 2398890

Flushing is a village in Belmont County, Ohio, United States. The population was 830 at the 2020 census.

== History ==
Flushing was platted in 1813. The village was incorporated in 1849.

== Geography ==
According to the United States Census Bureau, the village has a total area of 0.61 square miles (1.58 km^{2}), all land.

== Demographics ==
Historical population
Census	Pop.	Note	%±
1850	325		—
1870	206		—
1880	334		62.1%
1890	528		58.1%
1900	653		23.7%
1910	868		32.9%
1920	1,026		18.2%
1930	1,119		9.1%
1940	1,217		8.8%
1950	1,158		−4.8%
1960	1,189		2.7%
1970	1,207		1.5%
1980	1,266		4.9%
1990	1,042		−17.7%
2000	900		−13.6%
2010	879		−2.3%
2020	830		−5.6%
2023 (est.)	807	▼	−2.8%
U.S. Decennial Census

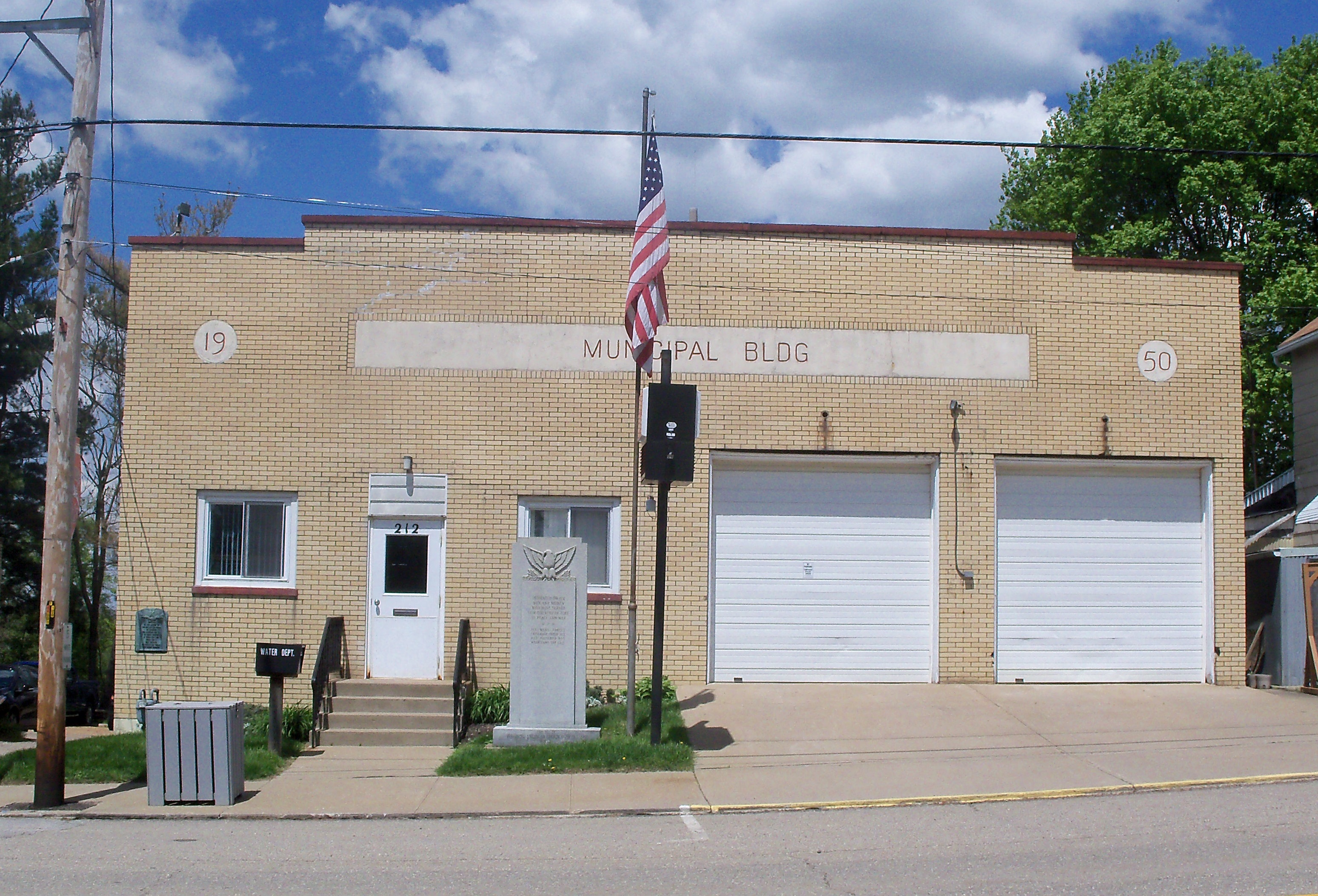
Flushing Municipal Building

=== 2010 census ===
As of the census of 2010, there were 879 people, 384 households, and 225 families living in the village. The population density was 1,441.0 inhabitants per square mile (556.4/km^{2}). There were 426 housing units at an average density of 698.4 per square mile (269.7/km^{2}). The racial makeup of the village was 97.6% White, 1.4% African American, 0.2% Native American, and 0.8% from two or more races. Hispanic or Latino of any race were 0.7% of the population.

There were 384 households, of which 27.3% had children under the age of 18 living with them, 45.1% were married couples living together, 10.9% had a female householder with no husband present, 2.6% had a male householder with no wife present, and 41.4% were non-families. 35.2% of all households were made up of individuals, and 16.4% had someone living alone who was 65 years of age or older. The average household size was 2.29 and the average family size was 2.94.

The median age in the village was 40.7 years. 22.5% of residents were under the age of 18; 5.7% were between the ages of 18 and 24; 27.7% were from 25 to 44; 27.9% were from 45 to 64; and 16.3% were 65 years of age or older. The gender makeup of the village was 49.1% male and 50.9% female.

=== 2000 census ===
As of the census of 2000, there were 900 people, 380 households, and 250 families living in the village. The population density was 1,491.0 inhabitants per square mile (575.7/km^{2}). There were 434 housing units at an average density of 719.0 per square mile (277.6/km^{2}). The racial makeup of the village was 98.56% White, 1.00% African American, 0.11% Native American, 0.11% from other races, and 0.22% from two or more races.

There were 380 households, out of which 25.5% had children under the age of 18 living with them, 50.0% were married couples living together, 11.1% had a female householder with no husband present, and 34.2% were non-families. 30.0% of all households were made up of individuals, and 15.5% had someone living alone who was 65 years of age or older. The average household size was 2.37 and the average family size was 2.93.

In the village, the population was spread out, with 20.6% under the age of 18, 10.3% from 18 to 24, 28.9% from 25 to 44, 23.1% from 45 to 64, and 17.1% who were 65 years of age or older. The median age was 39 years. For every 100 females there were 96.5 males. For every 100 females age 18 and over, there were 93.2 males.

The median income for a household in the village was $26,875, and the median income for a family was $35,972. Males had a median income of $28,523 versus $17,768 for females. The per capita income for the village was $14,917. About 14.8% of families and 17.4% of the population were below the poverty line, including 29.3% of those under age 18 and 9.6% of those age 65 or over.

== Education ==
Flushing has a public library on East High Street, the Victoria Read Public Library, a branch of the Belmont County District Library.

== Attraction ==
The Underground Railroad Museum -Ohio Valley, founded in 1993 by Dr. John Mattox and his wife Rosalind, is on East High Street in the village.

== Notable people ==
- William H. H. Cash, American politician
- Wayne Hays, American politician
- Rachel Lloyd (1839-1900), chemist
- Reverdy C. Ransom, civil rights activist
