= Rachel Lloyd (chemist) =

American chemist (1839–1900)

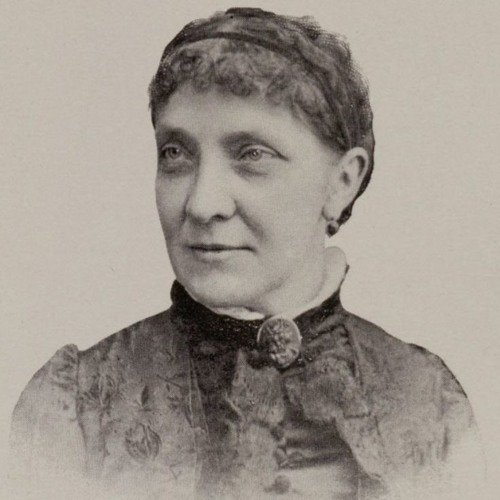
- Portrait of Rachel Lloyd
- Born: Rachel Abbie Holloway; January 26, 1839; Flushing, Ohio, U.S.
- Died: March 7, 1900 (aged 61); Beverly, New Jersey, U.S.
- Resting place: Laurel Hill Cemetery, Philadelphia, Pennsylvania, U.S.
- Education: University of Zurich
- Known for: Sugar Beet Chemistry & Agriculture; First American female PhD in chemistry First woman author in major chemistry journal
- Spouse: Franklin Lloyd (m. 1859)
- Children: 2
- Scientific career
- Fields: Chemistry
- Workplaces: University of Nebraska
- Thesis: On the conversion of some of the homologues of benzol-phenol into primary and secondary amines (1887)
- Doctoral advisor: A. Viktor Merz
- Other academic advisors: Charles F. Mabery

Rachel Holloway Lloyd (January 26, 1839 – March 7, 1900) was an American chemist who studied the chemistry and agriculture of sugar beets (Beta vulgaris). She studied at the Harvard Summer School and earned her doctorate from the University of Zurich in 1887. She was the first American woman to earn a doctorate of chemistry and the first woman to publish work in a major chemistry journal.

Lloyd worked as a professor of chemistry and head of the chemistry department at the University of Nebraska. Her work in determining the sucrose concentration of sugar beets helped establish a commercial sugar industry in Nebraska. In 1891, she became the first regularly admitted female member of the American Chemical Society. On October 1, 2014, the society designated her research and professional contributions to chemistry at the University of Nebraska National Historic Chemical Landmark.

== Early life and education ==
Rachel Abbie Lloyd (née Holloway) was born in Flushing, Ohio, to Quaker parents Robert Smith Holloway and Abigail Taber. Both of her parents were teachers until her father became the postmaster in Smyrna, Ohio. Lloyd experienced loss at a young age; all three of her siblings died in infancy, her mother died when she was 5, and her father died when she was 12 years old. She was raised by her father's second wife. At the age of 13, Holloway began attending the Friends school in Flushing, Ohio, then continued her education at Westtown School in West Chester, Pennsylvania. Her final year of schooling was completed at Miss Margaret Robinson's School for Young Ladies, where she would also begin teaching.

During her time at Robinson's School she met Franklin Lloyd, a chemist with Powers and Weightman. On May 11, 1859, when she was 20 years old, they married. Rachel Lloyd noted that Franklin kept a chemical laboratory in their home, which is where her interest in the field originated. In 1863, the couple moved to Bangor Township, Bay County, Michigan, where Franklin managed a saw mill, salt works, and barrel factory for lumber merchants in Philadelphia. The couple had two children together: Fanny (1860) and William C. (1865), both of whom died in infancy, Fanny of "disease of the brain" and William of jaundice.

Shortly after William's death, in October 1865, Franklin Lloyd also died. Rachel Lloyd inherited a sum of money, which she used to travel to Europe from 1867 to 1872, seeking medical treatment for rheumatism and neuralgia. However, financial difficulties forced her to return to the United States to look for work. Lloyd supported herself for some time as a science teacher at the Chestnut Street Female Seminary before making the decision to formally pursue her interest in chemistry.

From 1875 to 1883, Lloyd attended seven courses in chemistry and audited several botany courses at the Harvard Summer School. She conducted research with Charles F. Mabery and in 1881 published their research in the Proceedings of the American Academy of Arts and Sciences and the American Chemical Journal. This was the first time a woman had published a chemistry paper in a major scientific journal. She continued her research and coauthored three published papers between 1881–1884. It was during these years that Lloyd met Rachel Bodley, her future colleague in the American Chemical Society, and, in 1880, Henry Hudson Nicholson, her future colleague at the University of Nebraska. Lloyd continued to teach, including at the Louisville School of Pharmacy for Women in Kentucky.

In 1884, Lloyd enrolled at the University of Zurich, which at the time was the only institution where women were permitted to complete a doctorate in chemistry. Lloyd earned her doctorate in 1887 at the age of 48 and became the first American woman to receive a doctorate degree in chemistry. Her dissertation was on the conversion of phenols to aromatic amines under Professor August Viktor Merz. During this time, she also became interested in the emerging sugar beet industry.

== Career ==
=== Teaching ===
Lloyd began teaching immediately after finishing her early education at Miss Margaret Robinson's School for Young Ladies. Her next teaching position would be at the Chestnut Street Female Seminary in 1873, where she taught chemistry following her travels in Europe. In 1880, Lloyd served as the Lady Principal of Foster School for Girls in Clifton Springs, New York. She later worked as an instructor of chemistry at both Hampton College for Women and the Louisville School of Pharmacy for Women. Lloyd worked for a short period of time at the Normal School of Science and Royal School of Mines in London before joining the faculty of the University of Nebraska in 1887. In 1894, Lloyd became the Instructor of Science at Hillside Home School in Spring Green, Wisconsin.

=== University of Nebraska ===
In 1887, the University of Nebraska offered Lloyd an appointment as associate professor of analytical chemistry to join the departmental chair, Henry Hudson Nicholson, as the second person in the new chemistry department. Lloyd encouraged both young men and young women to enroll in the program, and during her tenure, the Nebraska section of the American Chemical Society had more women participants than any other section. Between 1888 and 1915, 10 of the 46 chemistry students were women.

Lloyd's scientific impact was based on her pioneering studies of sugars in sugar beets, using analytical techniques such as the saccharometer at the Nebraska Agricultural Experiment Stations. Lloyd's studies made use of test plots of sugar beets in various parts of Nebraska. Her scientific reports on sugar production in sugar beets first appeared in 1890, helping establish the economic viability of sugar beet farming in the latter part of the 19th century, critical to Nebraska farmers. According to Lindblom, production of sugar in Nebraska increased from 736,000 pounds to 8,378,000 pounds in just 5 years. The findings of Lloyd and Nicholson's work resulted in investors opening up the third sugar refinery in the United States in Nebraska. It was also the first refinery in the Midwest.

Lloyd became a full professor in 1888 and was promoted to the head of the department in 1892 while Nicholson was in Europe. However, that summer, she was afflicted with partial paralysis. She continued to teach until 1894, when she resigned due to ill health. After her death, Acting Chancellor Charles E. Bessey said in a memorial lecture at the University of Nebraska, "She was not only an eminent chemist, she was a great teacher, and more than that, she was the beloved advisor and counselor of students." This is further supported by her involvement in the Camera Club and the Scientific Club, through which she connected with students.

=== Affiliations and memberships ===
Throughout Lloyd's professional career she was a member of many clubs, associations, and professional societies. Her most notable memberships were in the American Association for the Advancement of Science, the Association for the Advancement of Women, and the American Chemical Society. Lloyd was also a member of the following organizations/clubs: the German Chemical Society, English Chemical Society, the American Association for the Advancement of Science, the Browning Club, the Nebraska Academy of Sciences, and the National American Woman Suffrage Association. Lloyd helped found the Hayden Art Club which was the predecessor to the Sheldon Museum of Art.

== Final years and death ==
She lived in the Philadelphia, Pennsylvania, area for the last seven years of her life, to be closer to friends and relatives. Lloyd died on March 7, 1900, in Beverly, New Jersey, due to heart failure and was buried with her husband and children in Laurel Hill Cemetery in Philadelphia.

== Legacy ==
In May 2014, a time capsule was opened at the University of Nebraska–Lincoln. The capsule came from the cornerstone of the building that had previously housed the chemistry department and had been planted there in 1916. The capsule had initially been forgotten but was discovered when a chemistry professor searching for information on Lloyd discovered a newspaper article about the capsule. The capsule contained newspapers from the time of its burial, information about what was happening at the school at the time, photos of members of the chemistry department, and other items related to the chemistry department as it had been in 1916. Included in these photos is a high resolution photo of Lloyd, which is often used in articles about her life and work. Arguably the most important item in the capsule was a biography of Lloyd's life, titled "In Memoriam: Rachel Lloyd, PhD." The book was written by her brother-in-law, Clement Lloyd, and contained information about her life that was not found elsewhere.

On October 1, 2014, the American Chemical Society designated her research and professional contributions to chemistry at the University of Nebraska–Lincoln a National Historic Chemical Landmark.

== Published works ==
- Conversion of some Homologues of Phenol into Primary and Secondary Amines, Journal of the Chemical Society, Volume 56, 1889
- Experiments in the Culture of the Sugar Beet in Nebraska, University of Nebraska, Agricultural Experiment Station of Nebraska, 1890

== See also ==
- Timeline of women in science
