= Lisbon, Juneau County, Wisconsin =

Lisbon, Wisconsin
- Town
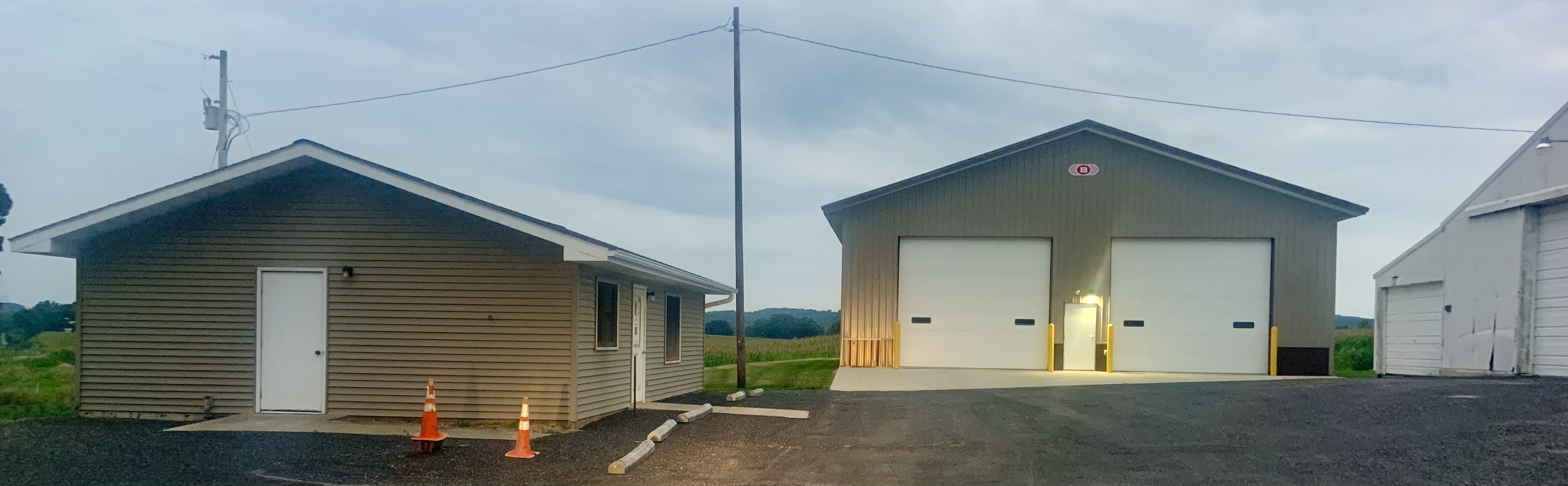
- Town hall

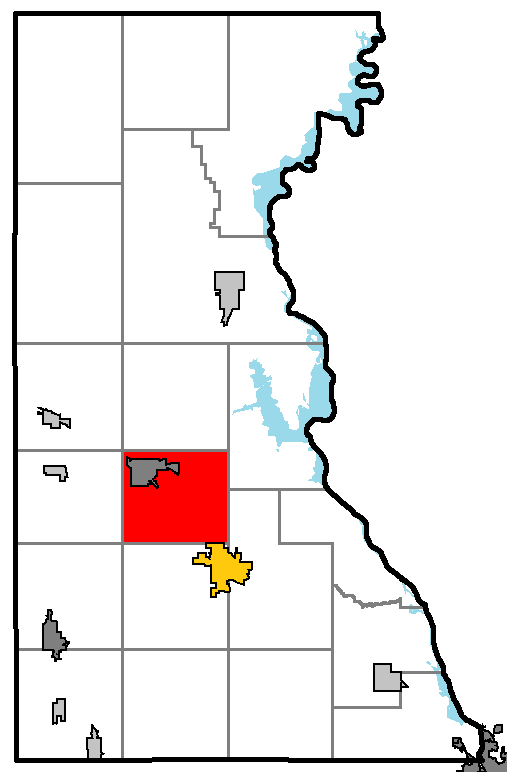
- Location of Lisbon, Juneau County

- Location of Juneau County, Wisconsin
- Coordinates: 43°51′25″N 90°8′50″W
- Country: United States
- State: Wisconsin
- County: Juneau

Area
  - Total: 28.3 sq mi (73.3 km^{2})
  - Land: 28.3 sq mi (73.2 km^{2})
  - Water: 0.039 sq mi (0.1 km^{2})
- Elevation: 876 ft (267 m)

Population (2020)
  - Total: 1,750
  - Density: 61.9/sq mi (23.9/km^{2})
- Time zone: UTC-6 (Central (CST))
  - Summer (DST): UTC-5 (CDT)
- Area code: 608
- FIPS code: 55-44825
- GNIS feature ID: 1583578
- Website: https://www.townoflisbonwi.gov/

Lisbon is a town in Juneau County, Wisconsin, United States. The population was 1,750 at the 2020 census.

== Geography ==
According to the United States Census Bureau, the town has a total area of 28.3 square miles (73.3 km^{2}), of which 28.2 square miles (73.2 km^{2}) is land and 0.1 square mile (0.1 km^{2}) (0.18%) is water.

== Demographics ==
As of the census of 2000, there were 1,020 people, 388 households, and 292 families residing in the town. The population density was 36.1 people per square mile (13.9/km^{2}). There were 438 housing units at an average density of 15.5 per square mile (6.0/km^{2}). The racial makeup of the town was 96.86% White, 0.10% African American, 0.78% Native American, 2.16% Asian, and 0.10% from two or more races. Hispanic or Latino of any race were 0.78% of the population.

There were 388 households, out of which 36.6% had children under the age of 18 living with them, 63.4% were married couples living together, 6.4% had a female householder with no husband present, and 24.7% were non-families. 21.6% of all households were made up of individuals, and 9.5% had someone living alone who was 65 years of age or older. The average household size was 2.63 and the average family size was 3.05.

In the town, the population was spread out, with 27.8% under the age of 18, 5.5% from 18 to 24, 27.2% from 25 to 44, 25.8% from 45 to 64, and 13.7% who were 65 years of age or older. The median age was 40 years. For every 100 females, there were 101.6 males. For every 100 females age 18 and over, there were 102.8 males.

The median income for a household in the town was $41,354, and the median income for a family was $47,946. Males had a median income of $32,039 versus $25,000 for females. The per capita income for the town was $18,231. About 6.3% of families and 8.9% of the population were below the poverty line, including 13.0% of those under age 18 and 4.6% of those age 65 or over.

== See also ==
- List of towns in Wisconsin
- New Lisbon, Wisconsin
