= Wonewoc, Wisconsin =

- Village
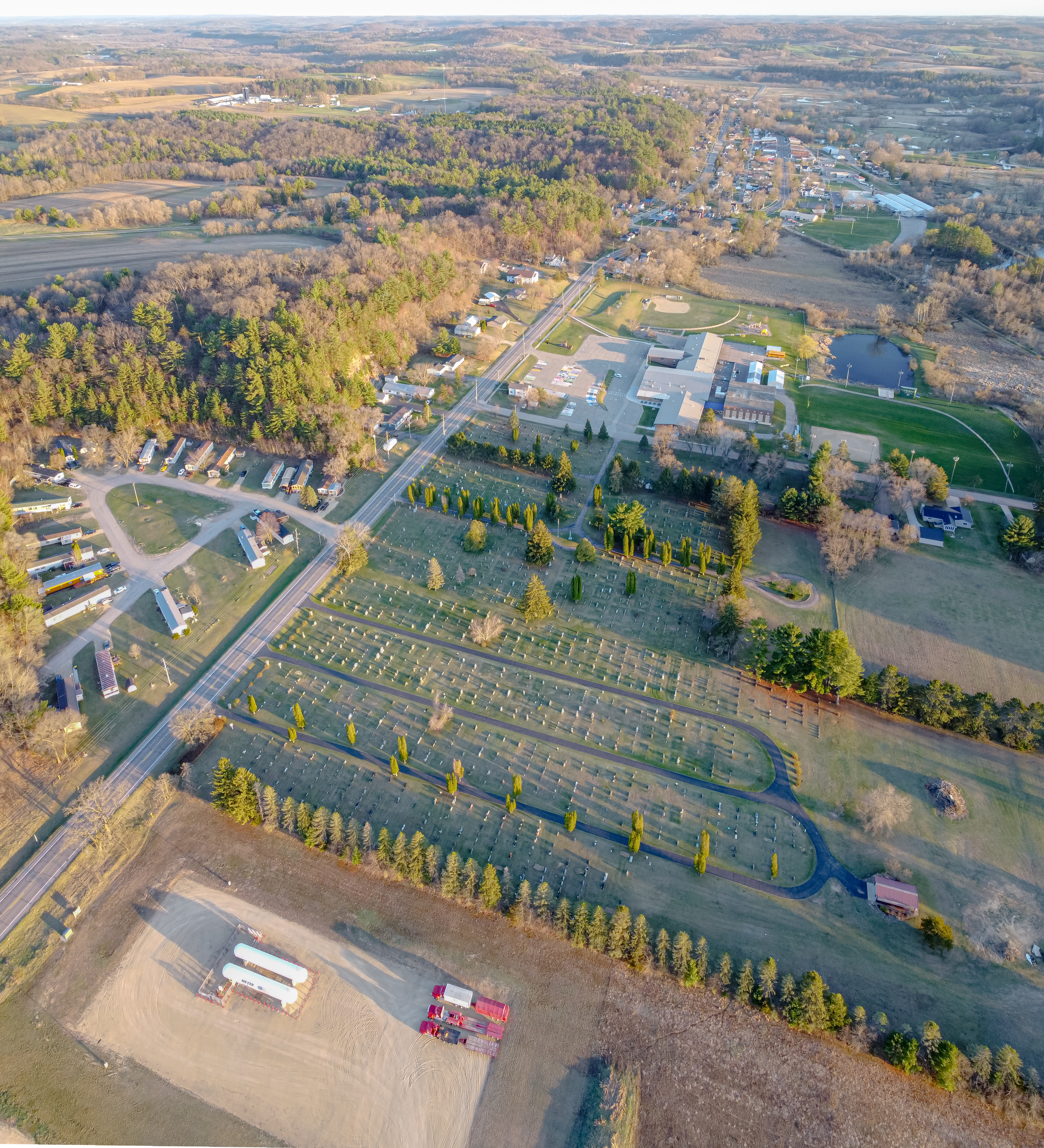
- Wis-33 runs through town

- Location of Wonewoc in Juneau County, Wisconsin.
- Coordinates: 43°40′N 90°14′W
- Country: United States
- State: Wisconsin
- County: Juneau

Area
  - Total: 1.12 sq mi (2.89 km^{2})
  - Land: 1.12 sq mi (2.89 km^{2})
  - Water: 0 sq mi (0.00 km^{2})
- Elevation: 961 ft (293 m)

Population (2020)
  - Total: 758
  - Density: 679/sq mi (262/km^{2})
- Time zone: UTC-6 (Central (CST))
  - Summer (DST): UTC-5 (CDT)
- Area code: 608
- FIPS code: 55-88500
- GNIS feature ID: 1576954

Wonewoc is a village along the Baraboo River in Juneau County, Wisconsin, United States. The population was 758 at the time of the 2020 census.

== History ==
The name “Wonewoc” is of Indigenous American origin, probably meaning "howling hills". However, at the time of colonization, the site and subsequent town were known to the native Hoocąk (Winnebago) people as Wonį́wąk, which derives ultimately from an infinitive meaning, "to be wicked, bad." However, Josephine White Eagle says that wōnį́wąk means more precisely, "you (sg.) are naughty, foolish, not thinking." Apparently, a settler asked a native resident, "What do you call this place?" and the man replied, "You're a knucklehead."

George and Lucinda Willard first settled the area in 1851. The town was incorporated as a village in 1878, and once the railroad was built village growth exploded. The population of the town was largely settled by Yankee colonists from New England, according to the 1860 census.

When the railroad era ended Wonewoc’s growth halted. Wonewoc is now a quiet town known for its beauty and close-knit community.

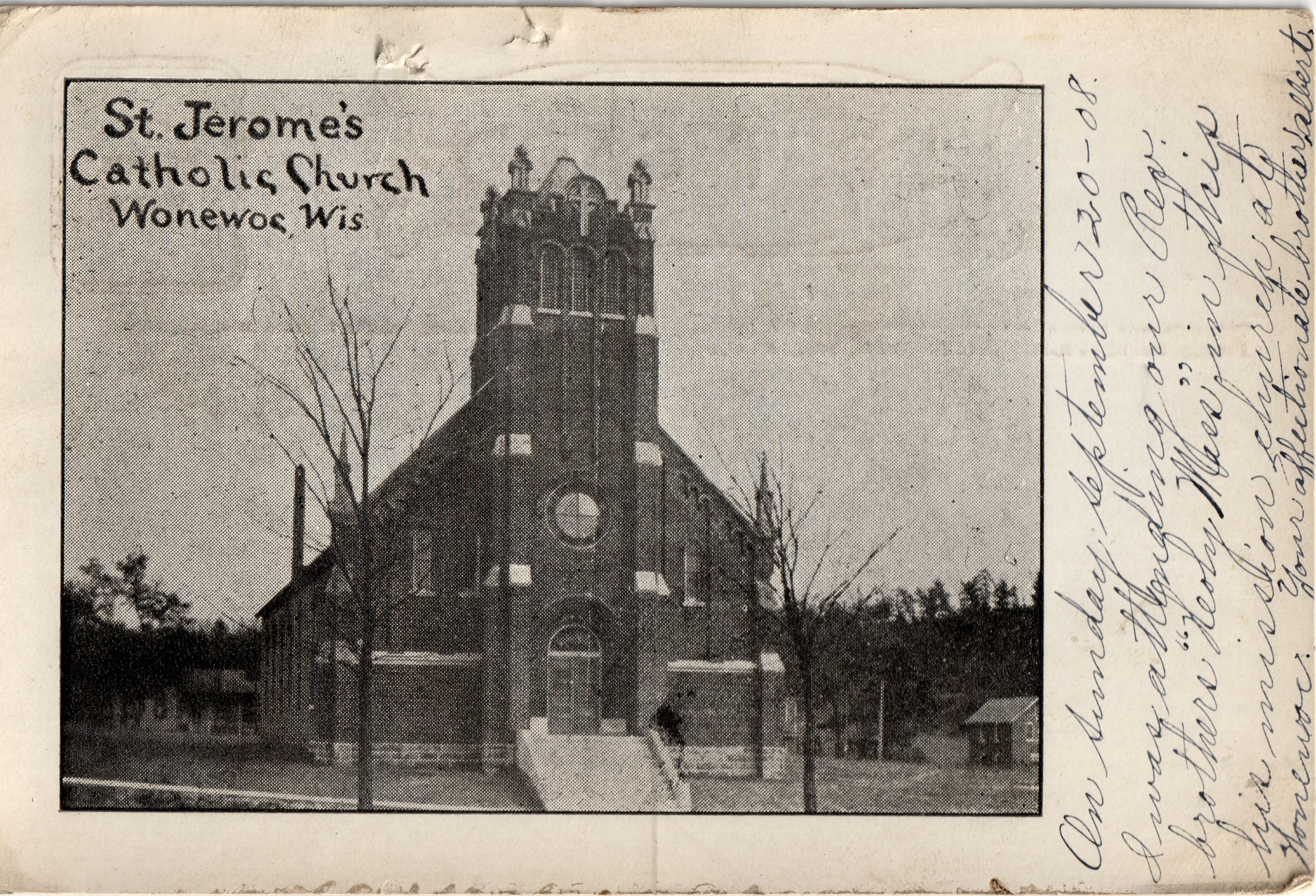
St Jerome's Catholic Church, Wonewoc Wisconsin, about 1908

== Geography ==
Wonewoc is located in the southernmost part of Juneau County, in an unglaciated region of Wisconsin. The resulting landscape is filled with jagged bluffs, with the scenic Baraboo River flowing next to the town.

The Wonewoc Formation was first described here and named for the village.

Wonewoc is located at 43°40' North, 90°14' West (43.654, -90.223).

According to the United States Census Bureau, the village has a total area of 1.11 square miles (2.87 km^{2}), all land.

== Demographics ==
Historical population
Census	Pop.	Note	%±
1880	635		—
1890	619		−2.5%
1900	811		31.0%
1910	789		−2.7%
1920	798		1.1%
1930	717		−10.2%
1940	793		10.6%
1950	961		21.2%
1960	878		−8.6%
1970	835		−4.9%
1980	842		0.8%
1990	793		−5.8%
2000	834		5.2%
2010	816		−2.2%
2020	758		−7.1%
U.S. Decennial Census

=== 2010 census ===
As of the census of 2010, there were 816 people, 359 households, and 215 families residing in the village. The population density was 735.1 inhabitants per square mile (283.8/km^{2}). There were 406 housing units at an average density of 365.8 per square mile (141.2/km^{2}). The racial makeup of the village was 97.9% White, 0.5% African American, 0.1% Native American, 0.4% Asian, 0.2% from other races, and 0.9% from two or more races. Hispanic or Latino of any race were 1.3% of the population.

There were 359 households, of which 30.4% had children under the age of 18 living with them, 43.5% were married couples living together, 12.0% had a female householder with no husband present, 4.5% had a male householder with no wife present, and 40.1% were non-families. 34.3% of all households were made up of individuals, and 17.8% had someone living alone who was 65 years of age or older. The average household size was 2.25 and the average family size was 2.84.

The median age in the village was 40.8 years. 23.9% of residents were under the age of 18; 6.8% were between the ages of 18 and 24; 24.2% were from 25 to 44; 26.1% were from 45 to 64; and 19.1% were 65 years of age or older. The gender makeup of the village was 46.3% male and 53.7% female.

=== 2000 census ===
As of the census of 2000, there were 834 people, 369 households, and 225 families residing in the village. The population density was 803.3 inhabitants per square mile (309.6/km^{2}). There were 392 housing units at an average density of 377.6 per square mile (145.5/km^{2}). The racial makeup of the village was 98.92% White, 0.00% Black or African American, 0.36% Native American, 0.36% Asian, 0.00% Pacific Islander, 0.00% from other races, and 0.36% from two or more races. 0.36% of the population were Hispanic or Latino of any race.

There were 369 households, out of which 27.9% had children under the age of 18 living with them, 44.7% were married couples living together, 11.9% had a female householder with no husband present, and 39.0% were non-families. 35.2% of all households were made up of individuals, and 19.0% had someone living alone who was 65 years of age or older. The average household size was 2.23 and the average family size was 2.82.

In the village, the population was spread out, with 23.4% under the age of 18, 9.4% from 18 to 24, 25.5% from 25 to 44, 19.2% from 45 to 64, and 22.5% who were 65 years of age or older. The median age was 39 years. For every 100 females, there were 83.3 males. For every 100 females age 18 and over, there were 85.2 males.

The median income for a household in the village was $28,393, and the median income for a family was $36,667. Males had a median income of $28,611 versus $20,125 for females. The per capita income for the village was $18,957. 9.6% of the population and 3.9% of families were below the poverty line. Out of the total population, 12.2% of those under the age of 18 and 13.1% of those 65 and older were living below the poverty line.

== Government ==
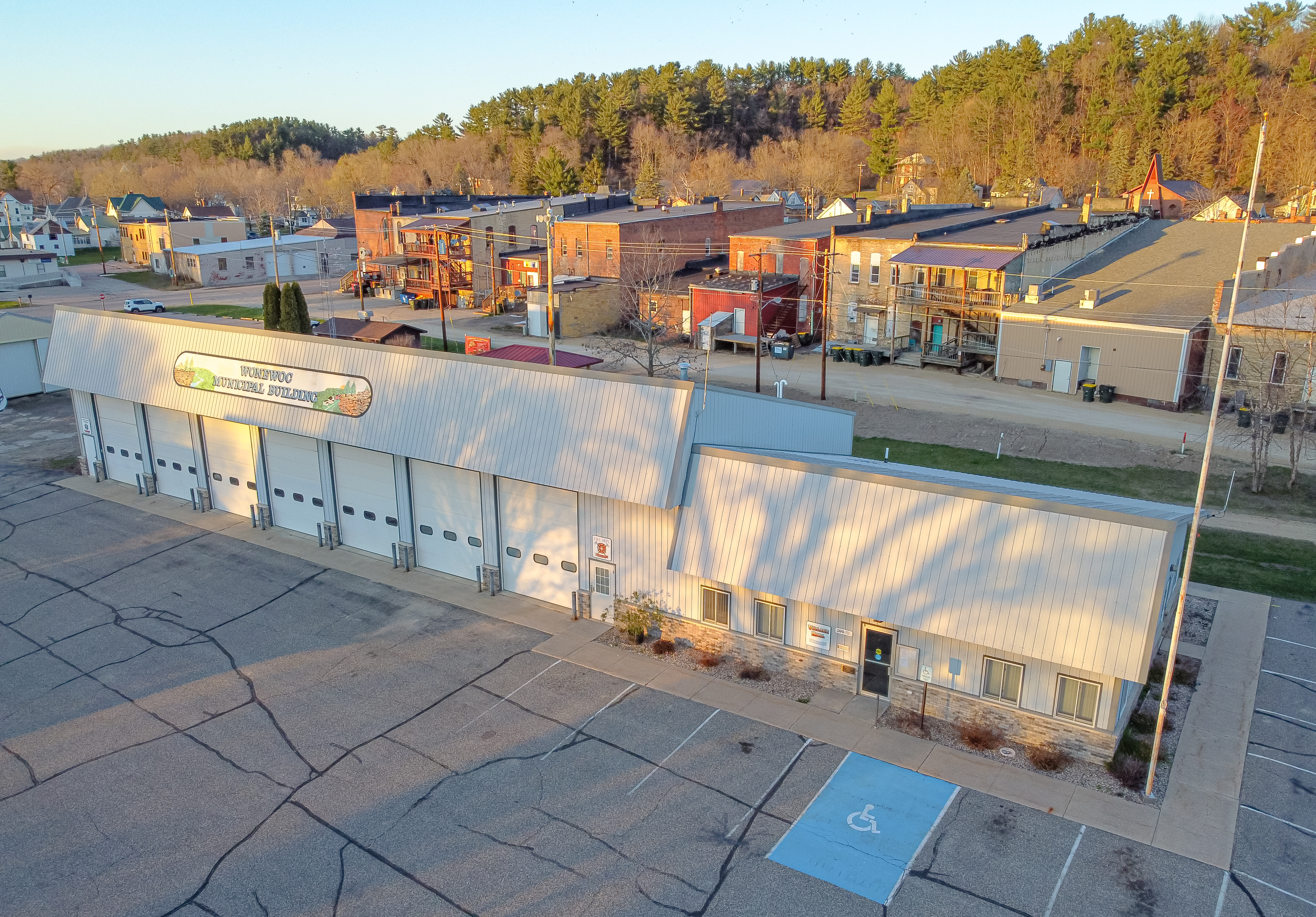
Wonewoc Village Hall

The village government is made up of a president and board of trustees. The president is Don Hubele, and the board of trustees include Matt Schmidt, Mike Roraff, Lori Stokes, Tonia Schumann, Kathy Kucher, and Josh Roehling.

== Religion ==
The Wonewoc Spiritualist Camp is in Wonewoc. Within the village are three churches: United Methodist Church, St. Paul’s Lutheran Church and St. Jerome’s Catholic Church.

== Tourism and recreation ==
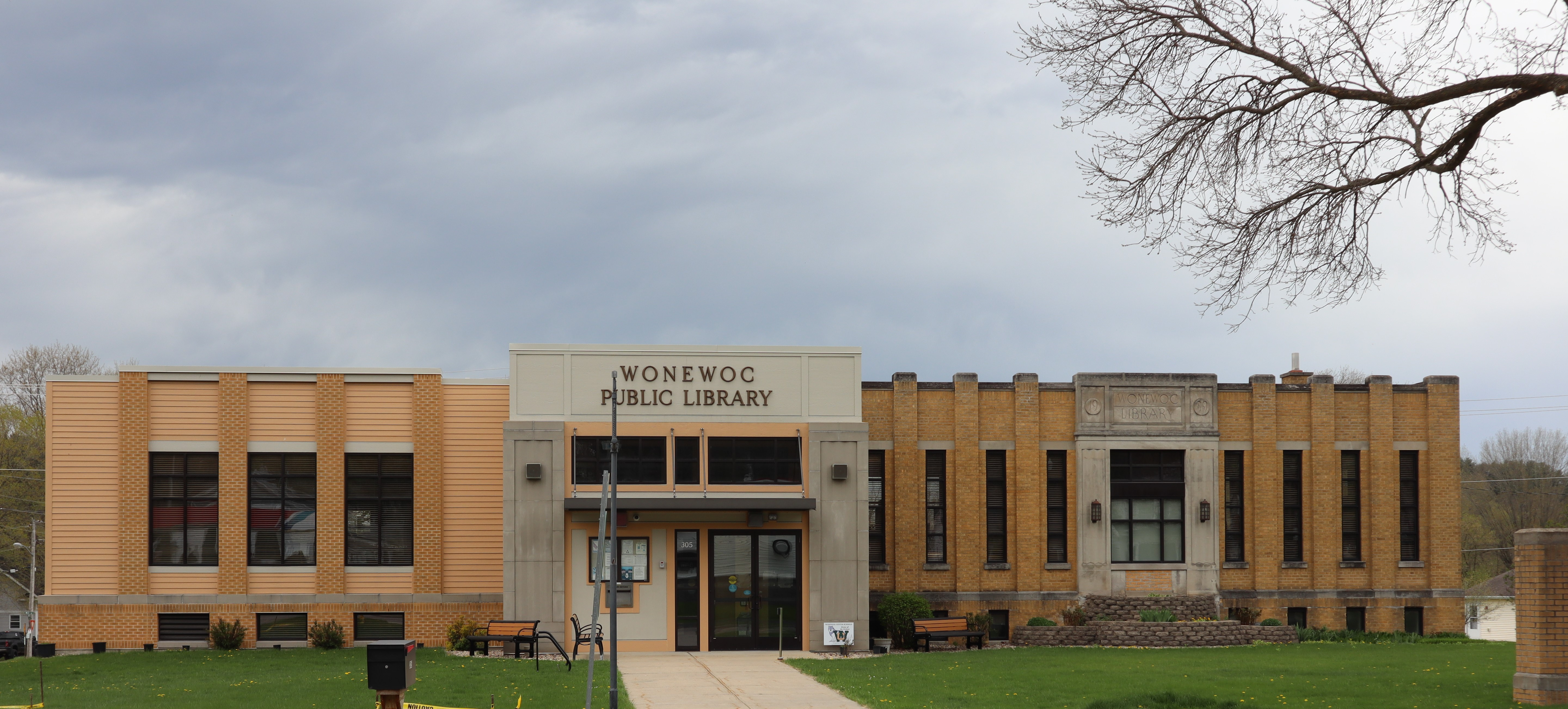
Wonewoc Public Library

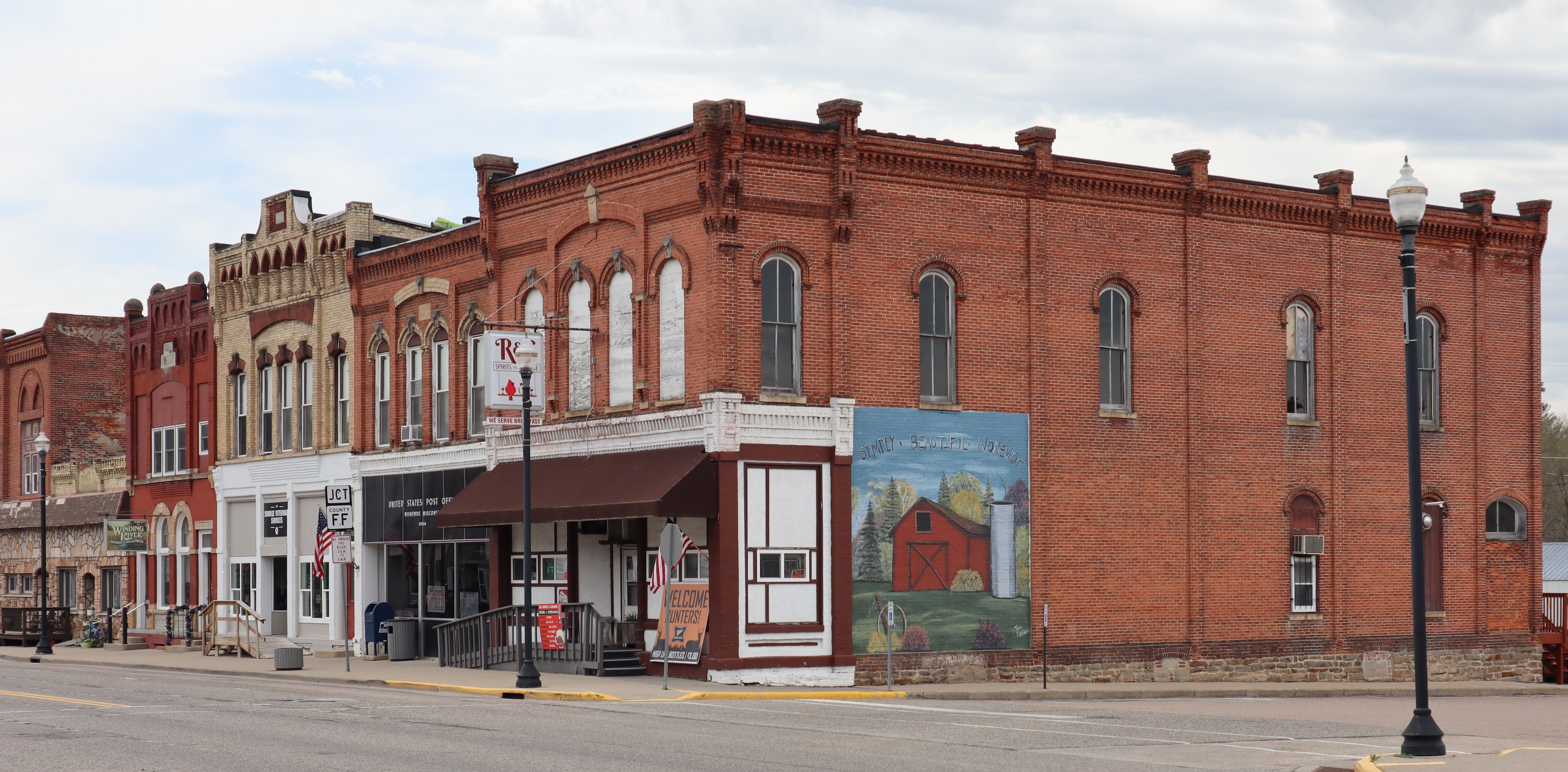
Downtown Wonewoc

Wonewoc is the midpoint of the 400 Trail, one of the area's many trails used by bikers, hikers, horse riders and snowmobile enthusiasts. The Baraboo River is used for canoeing and kayaking, as are the nearby lakes, Dutch Hollow and Lake Redstone, which also offer fishing, swimming, and other water sports. Wonewoc has a public pool, camping, and parks.

== Notable people ==
- Belle Case La Follette, activist and wife of Robert M. La Follette, Sr.
- Job Grant, pioneer, farmer and legislator
- Clinton G. Price, lawyer and politician
- Elmore Y. Sarles, ninth governor of North Dakota
- Robert Schulz, jazz and Dixieland cornetist

== See also ==
- List of villages in Wisconsin
- Wonewoc (town), Wisconsin
