= Dwight A. York =

American politician

Dwight A. York (born November 25, 1939) is a former member of the Wisconsin State Assembly.

== Biography ==
York was born on November 25, 1939, in New Lisbon, Wisconsin. He graduated from New Lisbon High School before obtaining a B.A. from the University of Wisconsin-Whitewater and an M.A. from Colorado State University. York is married with two children.

== Career ==
York was elected to the Assembly in 1984 and served a two terms, leaving office in 1989. Previously, he served as Superintendent of Schools of Lomira, Wisconsin. He is a Republican.
