= Wonewoc (town), Wisconsin =

Town in Wisconsin, United States

Wonewoc, Wisconsin
- Town
- Town of Wonewoc
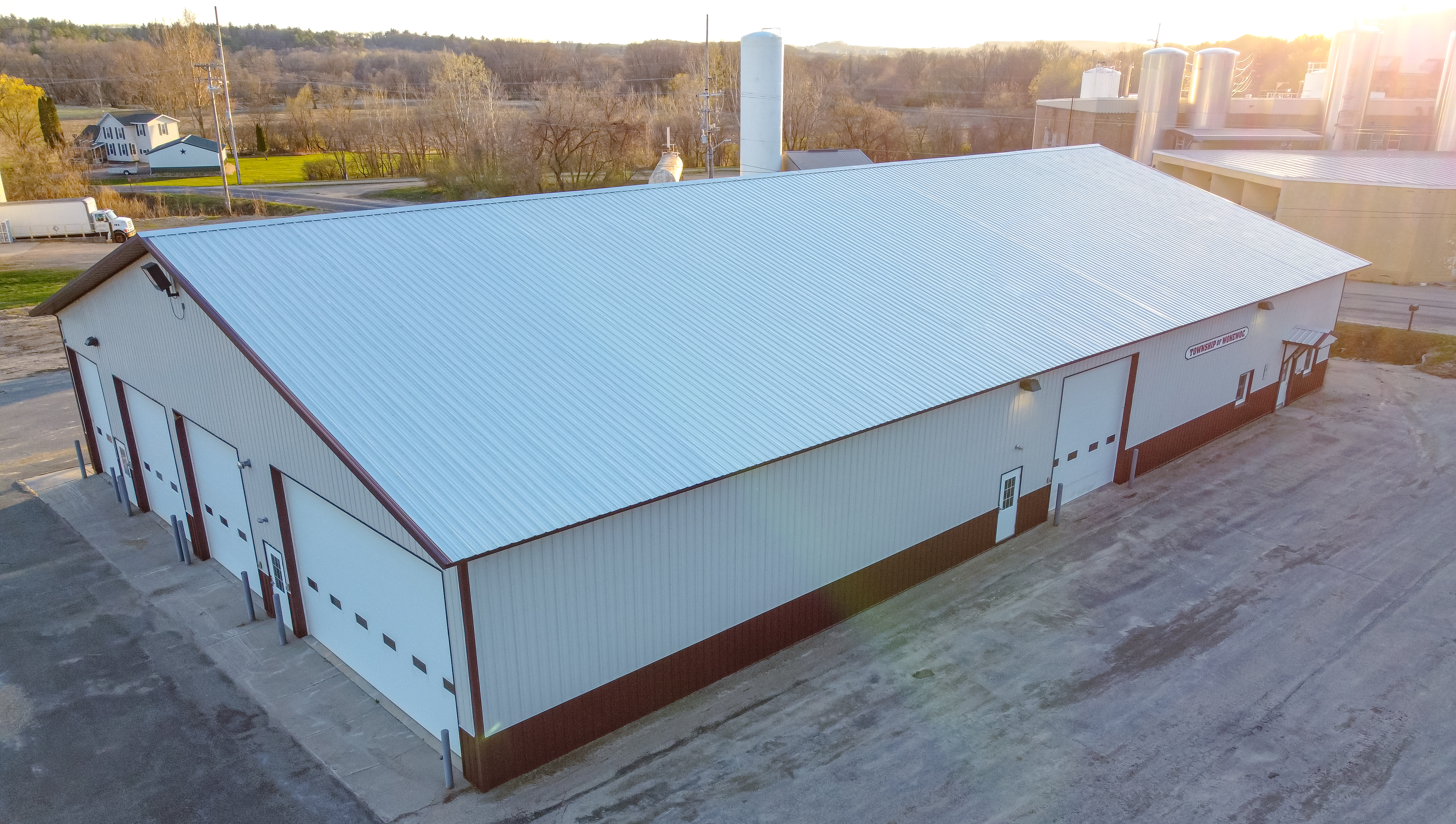
- Wonewoc Town Hall

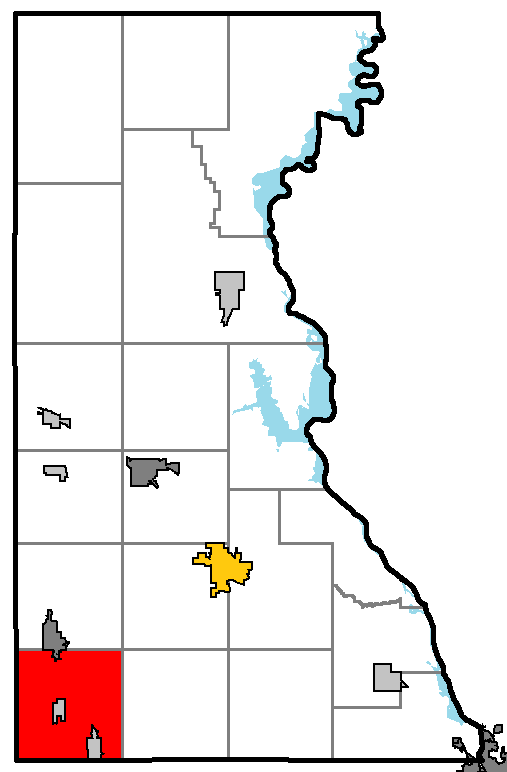
- Location of Wonewoc, Juneau County

- Location of Juneau County, Wisconsin
- Coordinates: 43°40′57″N 90°14′51″W
- Country: United States
- State: Wisconsin
- County: Juneau

Area
  - Total: 35.42 sq mi (91.7 km^{2})
  - Land: 35.41 sq mi (91.7 km^{2})
  - Water: 0.02 sq mi (0.052 km^{2})

Population (2020)
  - Total: 677
  - Density: 19.1/sq mi (7.38/km^{2})
- Time zone: UTC-6 (Central (CST))
  - Summer (DST): UTC-5 (CDT)
- Area code(s): 608 and 353
- GNIS feature ID: 1584471

Wonewoc is a town in Juneau County, Wisconsin, United States. The population was 677 at the 2020 census. The Village of Wonewoc and the village of Union Center are located within the town.

== Geography ==
According to the United States Census Bureau, the town has a total area of 35.5 square miles (92.0 km^{2}), of which 35.5 square miles (92.0 km^{2}) is land and 0.04 square mile (0.1 km^{2}) (0.06%) is water.

== Demographics ==
As of the census of 2000, there were 783 people, 288 households, and 228 families residing in the town. The population density was 22.0 people per square mile (8.5/km^{2}). There were 318 housing units at an average density of 9.0 per square mile (3.5/km^{2}). The racial makeup of the town was 99.74% White, 0.13% Native American, and 0.13% from two or more races. 0.26% of the population were Hispanic or Latino of any race.

There were 288 households, out of which 32.3% had children under the age of 18 living with them, 70.1% were married couples living together, 7.6% had a female householder with no husband present, and 20.5% were non-families. 14.6% of all households were made up of individuals, and 6.9% had someone living alone who was 65 years of age or older. The average household size was 2.72 and the average family size was 3.03.

In the town, the population was spread out, with 26.1% under the age of 18, 7.4% from 18 to 24, 27.1% from 25 to 44, 25.5% from 45 to 64, and 13.9% who were 65 years of age or older. The median age was 39 years. For every 100 females, there were 102.8 males. For every 100 females age 18 and over, there were 95.6 males.

The median income for a household in the town was $37,875, and the median income for a family was $47,500. Males had a median income of $31,250 versus $24,063 for females. The per capita income for the town was $18,666. About 2.2% of families and 4.5% of the population were below the poverty line, including 2.6% of those under age 18 and 10.4% of those age 65 or over.

== Notable people ==
- Job Grant, farmer and Wisconsin State Representative
- David Rhodes, author
