= Wonewoc Spiritualist Camp =

Spiritualist Church community in Wisconsin, US

Coordinates: 43.653964°N 90.218488°W

Wonewoc Spiritualist Camp is a Spiritualist Church community, of the Modern Spiritualist movement, located at 304 Hill Street in Wonewoc, Wisconsin. It covers 30 acres, has been operating since 1874 and is affiliated with the National Association of Spiritualist Churches. The camp is open every June, July and August and offers classes and events with tickets available online for those interested in Spiritualism. There is no charge to visit the grounds. Normal hours of operation are Thursday thru Sunday.
