= E. D. Rogers =

American politician

E. D. Rogers (June 27, 1838 – September 16, 1902) was an American surveyor, civil engineer, and politician.

Rogers was born in Argyle, Washington County, New York. He went to Argyle Academy, New York and the University of Wisconsin. In 1850, Rogers moved to Madison, Wisconsin, He settled in Necedah, Wisconsin in 1855. He served in the Union Army during the American Civil War. Rogers was a civil engineer and a surveyor. He was involved in the real estate and cranberry business. Rogers served as county surveyor for Juneau County, Wisconsin and as deputy sheriff. Rogers served in the Wisconsin Assembly in 1875 and was a Democrat. Rogers died in Necedah, Wisconsin at his home after suffering a stroke.
