= Charles Erwin Booth =

American politician

Charles Erwin Booth (July 1, 1840 – September 9, 1907) was a member of the Wisconsin State Assembly.

== Biography ==
Booth was born on July 1, 1840, in Washington, New York. After serving in the American Civil War with the 89th New York Infantry Regiment, he resided in Rock County, Wisconsin, and Walworth County, Wisconsin. In 1870, he graduated from Rush Medical College. The following year, Booth settled in Elroy, Wisconsin.

== Assembly career ==
Booth was a member of the Assembly during the 1876 session. He was a Republican.
