= New Lisbon, Wisconsin =

- City
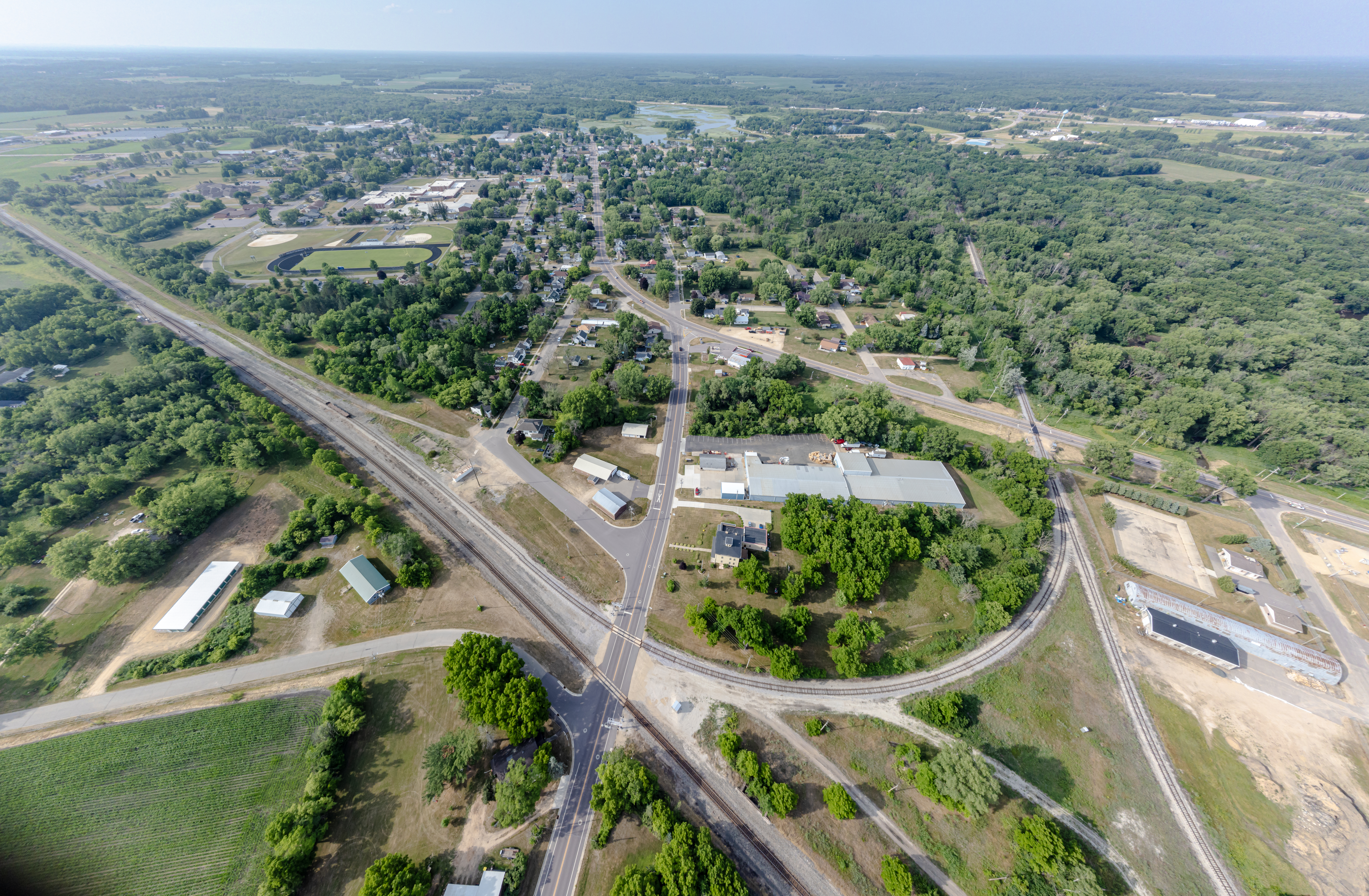

- Location of New Lisbon in Juneau County, Wisconsin.

- Location within Wisconsin Location within the United States
- Coordinates: 43°52′37″N 90°9′57″W
- Country: United States
- State: Wisconsin
- County: Juneau

Area
  - Total: 2.92 sq mi (7.57 km^{2})
  - Land: 2.73 sq mi (7.08 km^{2})
  - Water: 0.19 sq mi (0.49 km^{2})
- Elevation: 896 ft (273 m)

Population (2020)
  - Total: 1,748
  - Density: 639/sq mi (246.9/km^{2})
- Time zone: UTC-6 (Central (CST))
  - Summer (DST): UTC-5 (CDT)
- Area code: 608
- FIPS code: 55-56900
- GNIS feature ID: 1570225
- Website: cityofnewlisbon.com

New Lisbon is a city in Juneau County, Wisconsin, United States. The population was 1,748 at the 2020 census.

== History ==
The site of New Lisbon was used as a seasonal winter encampment by Ho-Chunk people, who called it Waac Hot’ųp Ra or Waac Hožu Ra (anglicized to Wa Du Shuda), meaning "where canoes are placed" or "boat launch." The United States acquired the land from the Ho-Chunk nation in an 1836 treaty.

The first white settlers, Amasa Wilson and C.B. Smith, arrived in 1838 to harvest lumber in the vicinity. Wilson and Smith selected the site of New Lisbon for a log boom on the Lemonweir River and constructed a sawmill at the site in 1842-1843. In 1855, Amasa Wilson platted the village. J.A. Chase platted an addition not long afterwards. The village was originally named Mill Haven but later changed to New Lisbon, possibly at the suggestion of county clerk Larmon Saxton, who hailed from Lisbon, Ohio. In 1857, the La Crosse and Milwaukee Railroad connected to the community. New Lisbon was incorporated by the Wisconsin Legislature in March 1870.

== Geography ==
New Lisbon is located at 43°52′37″N 90°9′57″W (43.877032, -90.165908).

According to the United States Census Bureau, the city has a total area of 2.92 square miles (7.56 km^{2}), of which 2.73 square miles (7.07 km^{2}) is land and 0.19 square miles (0.49 km^{2}) is water.

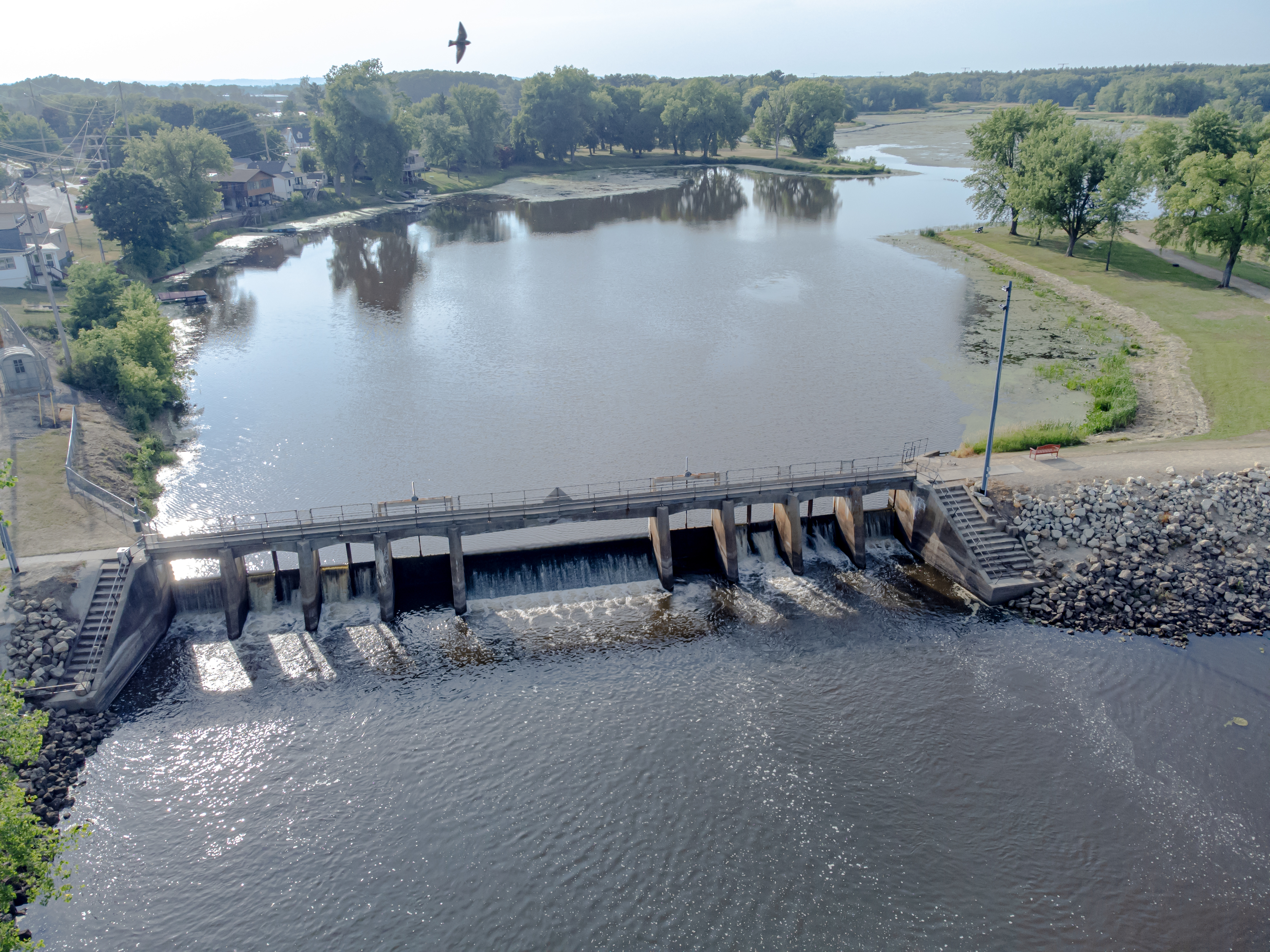
New Lisbon dam on the Lemonweir River

== Airport ==
New Lisbon is serviced by the Mauston–New Lisbon Union Airport (82C). The airport is jointly owned with Mauston.

== Demographics ==
Historical population
Census	Pop.	Note	%±
1870	1,221		—
1880	1,024		−16.1%
1890	990		−3.3%
1900	1,014		2.4%
1910	1,074		5.9%
1920	994		−7.4%
1930	1,076		8.2%
1940	1,215		12.9%
1950	1,482		22.0%
1960	1,337		−9.8%
1970	1,361		1.8%
1980	1,390		2.1%
1990	1,491		7.3%
2000	1,436		−3.7%
2010	2,554		77.9%
2020	1,748		−31.6%
U.S. Decennial Census

=== 2020 census ===
As of the census of 2020, the population was 1,748. The population density was 639.6 inhabitants per square mile (247.0/km^{2}). There were 703 housing units at an average density of 257.2 per square mile (99.3/km^{2}). The racial makeup of the city was 88.7% White, 4.4% Black or African American, 0.8% Asian, 0.6% Native American, 0.6% from other races, and 5.0% from two or more races. Ethnically, the population was 2.5% Hispanic or Latino of any race.

The 2020 census population of New Lisbon included 210 incarcerated people at the New Lisbon Correctional Institution.

According to the American Community Survey estimates for 2016-2020, the median income for a household in the city was $41,283, and the median income for a family was $54,028. Male full-time workers had a median income of $38,839 versus $35,156 for female workers. The per capita income for the city was $15,668. About 16.9% of families and 20.6% of the population were below the poverty line, including 27.6% of those under age 18 and 7.0% of those age 65 or over. Of the population age 25 and over, 89.7% were high school graduates or higher and 11.8% had a bachelor's degree or higher.

=== 2010 census ===
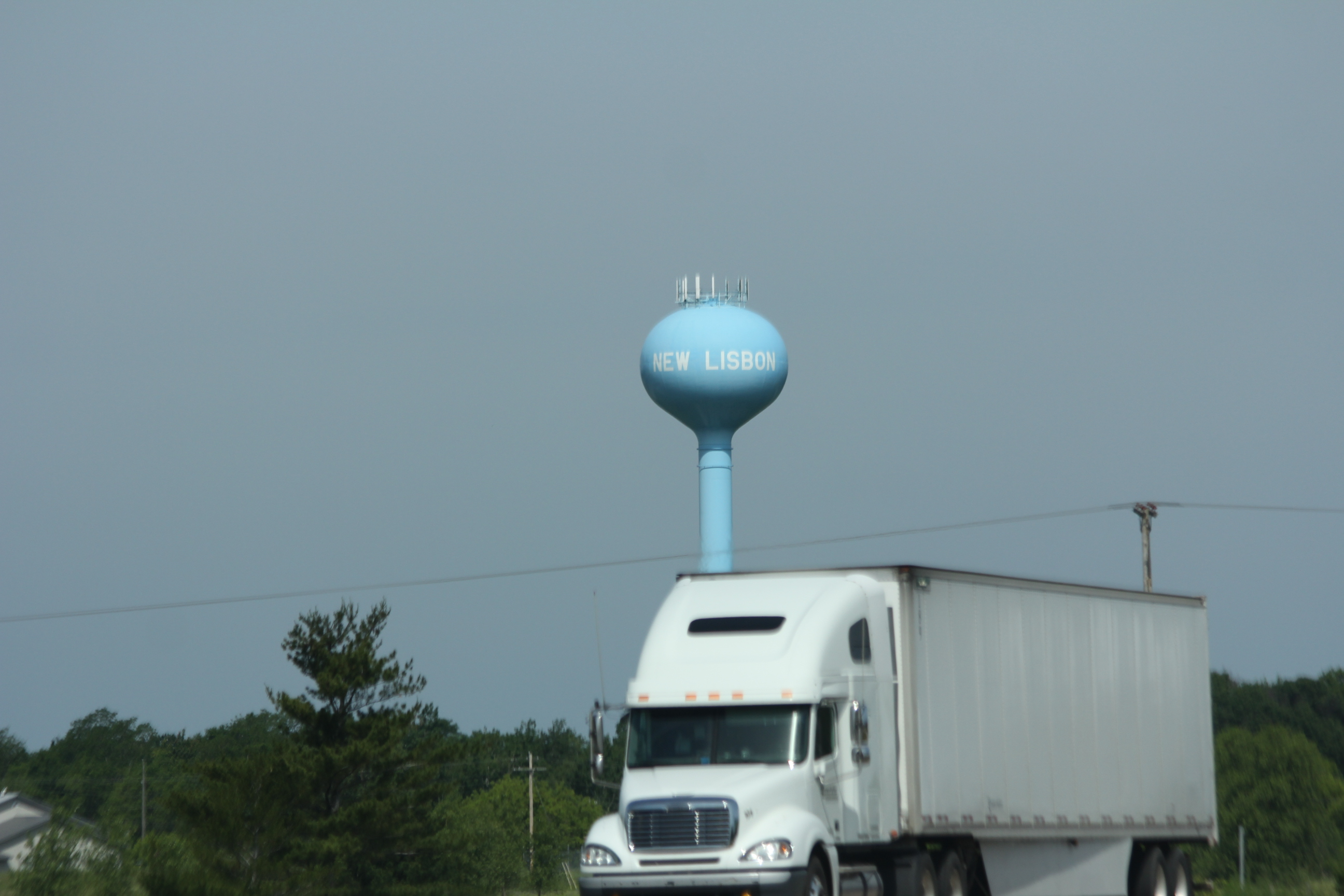
New Lisbon's Water Tower from Interstate 90

As of the census of 2010, there were 2,554 people, 631 households, and 360 families living in the city. The population density was 939.0 inhabitants per square mile (362.5/km^{2}). There were 720 housing units at an average density of 264.7 per square mile (102.2/km^{2}). The racial makeup of the city was 82.2% White, 14.6% African American, 1.3% Native American, 0.3% Asian, 0.4% from other races, and 1.1% from two or more races. Hispanic or Latino of any race were 4.3% of the population.

There were 631 households, of which 30.3% had children under the age of 18 living with them, 39.0% were married couples living together, 10.8% had a female householder with no husband present, 7.3% had a male householder with no wife present, and 42.9% were non-families. 35.7% of all households were made up of individuals, and 13.6% had someone living alone who was 65 years of age or older. The average household size was 2.33 and the average family size was 3.00.

The median age in the city was 38.9 years. 15.2% of residents were under the age of 18; 8.1% were between the ages of 18 and 24; 38.1% were from 25 to 44; 27.3% were from 45 to 64; and 11.3% were 65 years of age or older. The gender makeup of the city was 69.1% male and 30.9% female.

=== 2000 census ===
As of the census of 2000, there were 1,436 people, 617 households, and 383 families living in the city. The population density was 538.6 people per square mile (207.7/km^{2}). There were 690 housing units at an average density of 258.8 per square mile (99.8/km^{2}). The racial makeup of the city was 97.42% White, 0.21% African American, 0.63% Native American, 0.56% Asian, 0.07% Pacific Islander, 0.28% from other races, and 0.84% from two or more races. Hispanic or Latino of any race were 1.39% of the population.

There were 617 households, out of which 27.9% had children under the age of 18 living with them, 47.5% were married couples living together, 10.0% had a female householder with no husband present, and 37.8% were non-families. 32.3% of all households were made up of individuals, and 14.6% had someone living alone who was 65 years of age or older. The average household size was 2.33 and the average family size was 2.93.

In the city, the population was spread out, with 24.3% under the age of 18, 8.6% from 18 to 24, 27.0% from 25 to 44, 22.6% from 45 to 64, and 17.5% who were 65 years of age or older. The median age was 38 years. For every 100 females, there were 94.8 males. For every 100 females age 18 and over, there were 91.0 males.

== Government ==
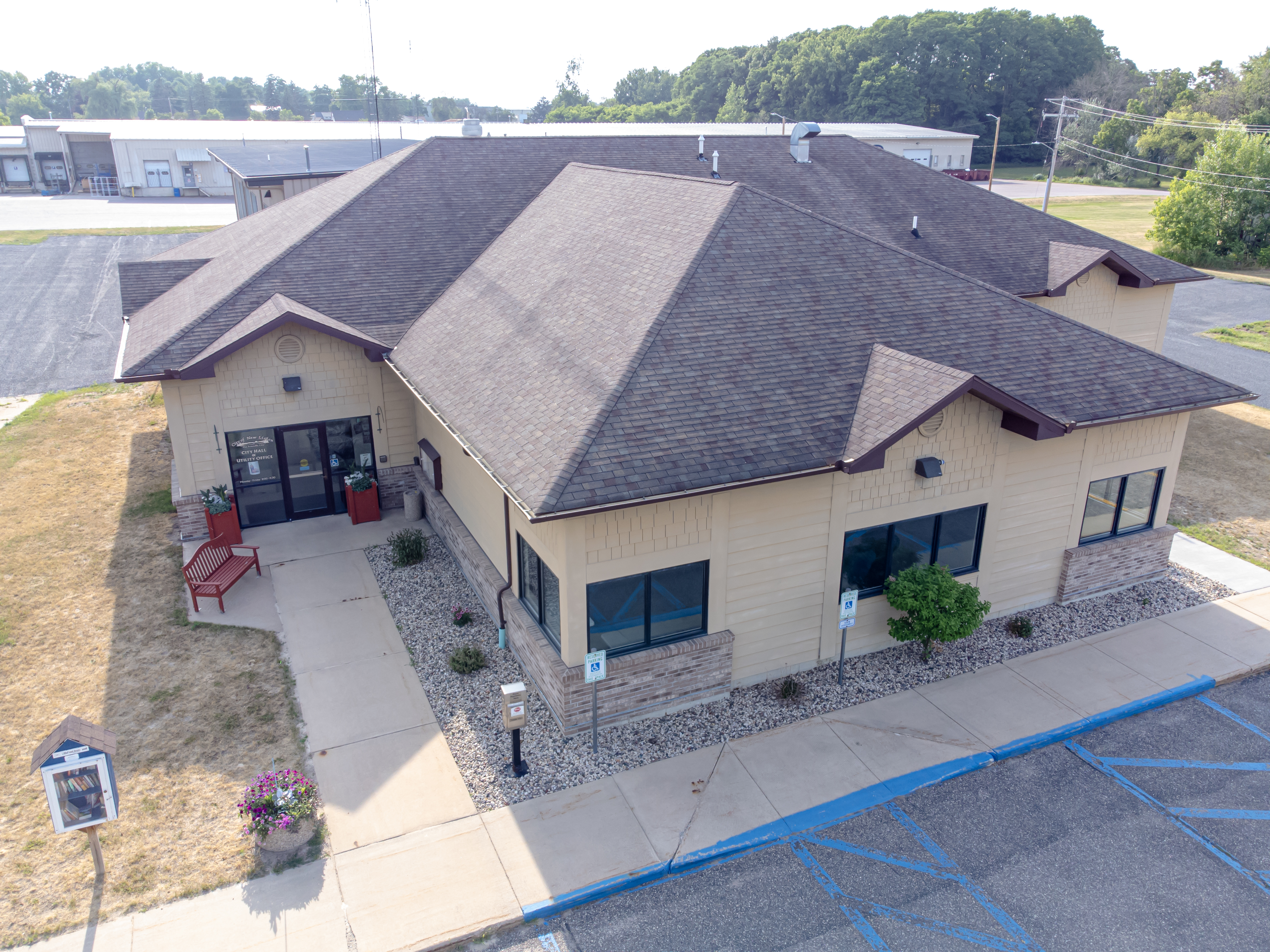
New Lisbon city hall

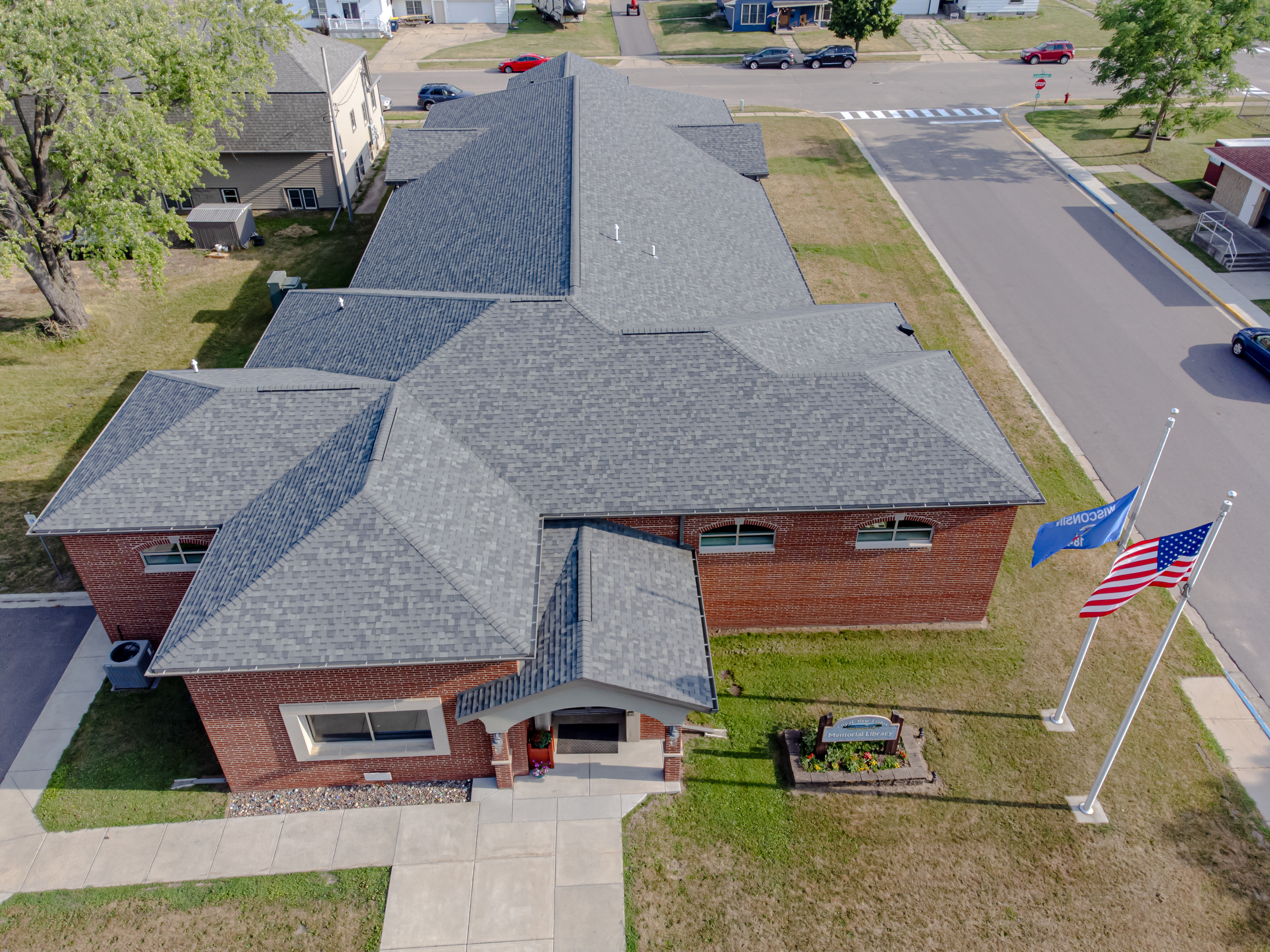
New Lisbon library

New Lisbon has a mayor-council form of government with a city administrator. The administrator has the powers previously vested in the clerk-treasurer and oversees city operations and budgets.

== Economy ==
In 2004, the New Lisbon Correctional Institution, a medium-security state prison, was built in the city.

== Notable residents ==
- Marc Andreessen, co-author of the Mosaic web browser (and now venture capitalist), grew up in New Lisbon
- Linda Balgord, Broadway performer
- John M. Barlow, Wisconsin State Representative
- William H. Barnes, Wisconsin State Representative
- William H. H. Cash, Wisconsin State Representative
- Alvina Krause, Northwestern University drama teacher
- H. J. Mortensen, Wisconsin State Representative
- Henry F. C. Nichols, Wisconsin State Representative
- Kurtwood Smith, actor, most notably played Red Forman on That '70s Show & That '90s Show
- Jarrod Washburn, former MLB pitcher
- Dwight A. York, Wisconsin State Representative, was born in New Lisbon
